= Hickam Air Force Base =

Air Force base at Honolulu International Airport, Hawaii, US

- Honolulu, Hawaii in the United States of America
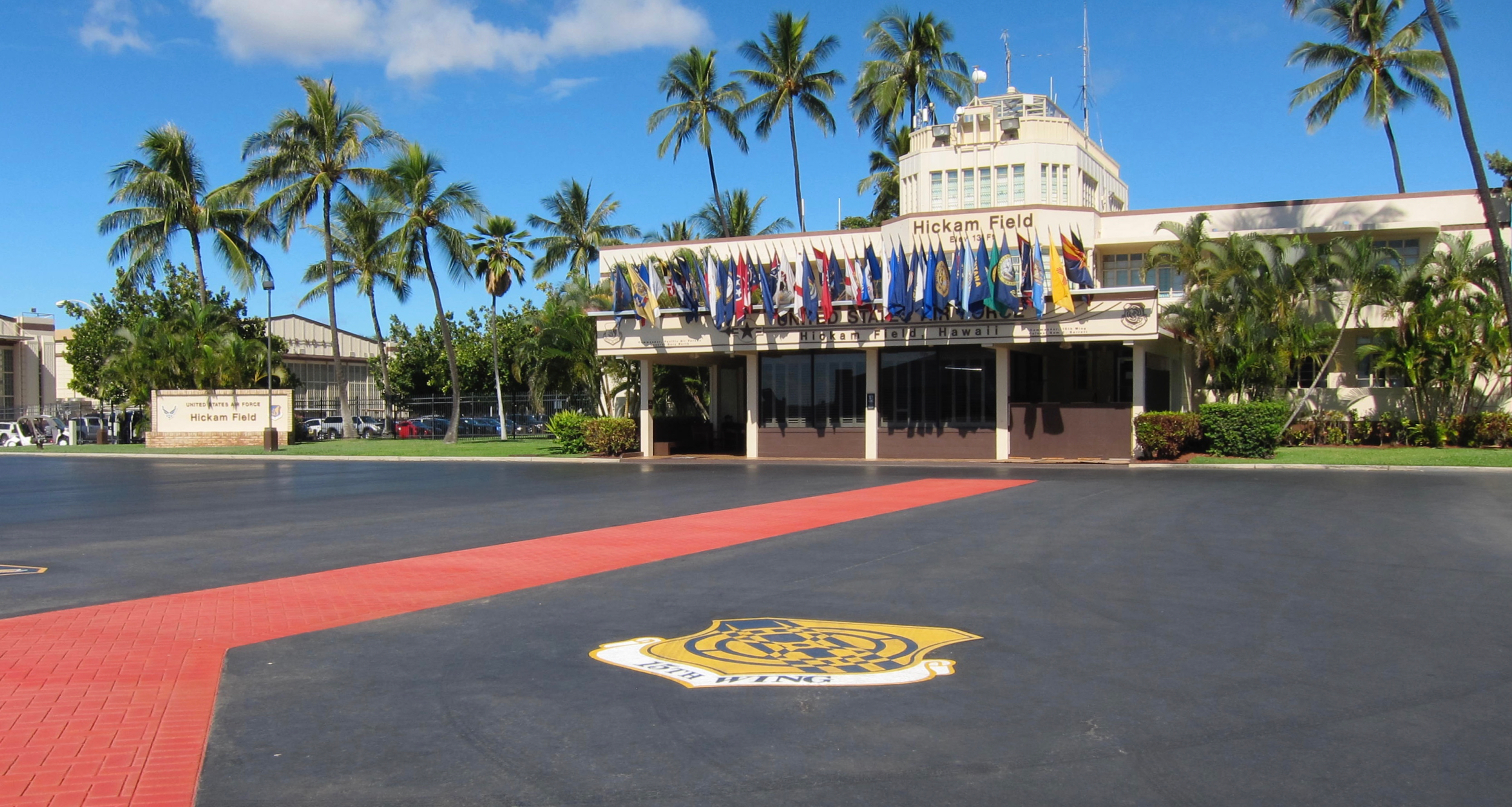
- The historic base operations building (DV1)

Site information
- Type: US Air Force Base
- Owner: Department of Defense
- Operator: US Air Force
- Website: www.hickam.af.mil

Location
- Coordinates: 21°19′07″N 157°55′21″W

Site history
- Built: 1938 (as Hickam Field)
- In use: 1938 – 2010
- Fate: Merged in 2010 to become an element of Joint Base Pearl Harbor–Hickam

Airfield information
- Identifiers: ICAO: PHIK, FAA LID: HIK
- Elevation: 3.9 metres (13 ft) AMSL
Runways
Direction	Length and surface
8L/26R	3,752.6 metres (12,312 ft) Asphalt
8R/26L	3,657.6 metres (12,000 ft) Asphalt
4R/22L	2,743.2 metres (9,000 ft) Asphalt
4L/22R	2,118.9 metres (6,952 ft) Asphalt
8W/26W	1,524 metres (5,000 ft) Water
4W/22W	914.4 metres (3,000 ft) Water
- Airfield shared with Honolulu International Airport; Source: Federal Aviation Administration

U.S. National Register of Historic Places
- Official name: Hickam Field

U.S. National Historic Landmark District
- Designated: 16 September 1985
- Reference no.: 85002725
- Periods of significance: 1925–1949
- Areas of significance: Military

Hickam Air Force Base is a United States Air Force (USAF) installation, named in honor of aviation pioneer Lieutenant Colonel Horace Meek Hickam. The installation merged in 2010 with Naval Station Pearl Harbor to become part of the newly formed Joint Base Pearl Harbor–Hickam, on the island of Oʻahu in the State of Hawaiʻi. The base neighbors Daniel K. Inouye International Airport and currently shares runways with the airport for its activities and operations.

== Major units ==
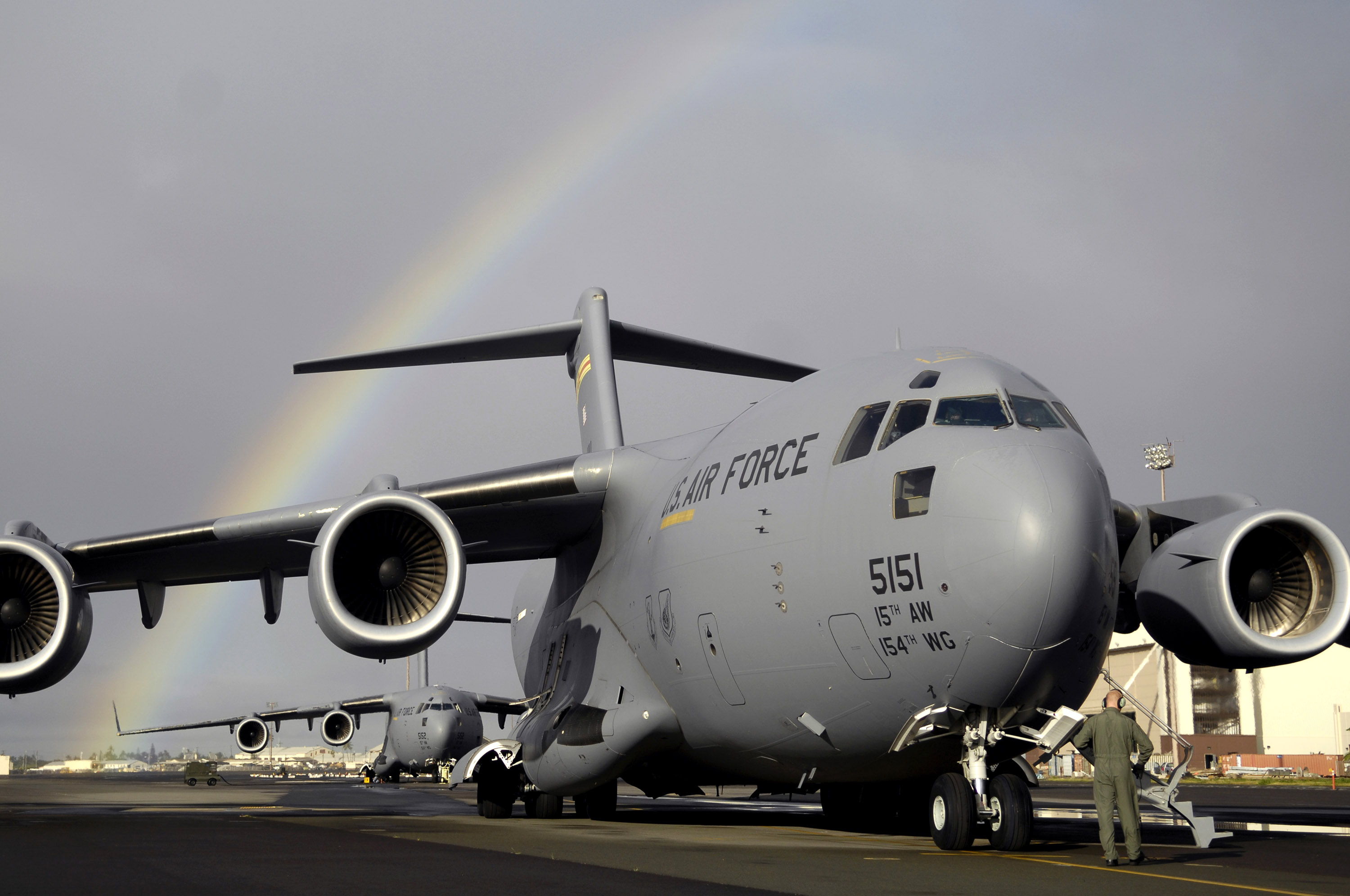
C-17A Globemaster III of the 15th Wing at Hickam AFB in 2008

Hickam is home to the 15th Wing (15 WG) and 67 partner units including Headquarters of Pacific Air Forces (PACAF), Hawaii Air National Guard and the 154th Wing (154 WG) of the Hawaii Air National Guard. The Air Mobility Command's 515th Air Mobility Operations Wing (515 AMOW) provides tactical and strategic airlift within the Pacific region.

In addition, Hickam supports 140 tenant and associate units.

The 15th Wing is composed of four groups each with specific functions. The 15th Operations Group (15 OG) controls all flying and airfield operations. The 15th Maintenance Group (15 MXG) performs aircraft and aircraft ground equipment maintenance. The 15th Mission Support Group (15 MSG) has a wide range of responsibilities but a few of its functions are Security, Civil Engineering, Communications, Personnel Management, Logistics, Services and Contracting support. The 15th Medical Group (15 MDG) provides medical and dental care.

- 15th Operations Group (Tail Code: HH)
  - 15th Operations Support Squadron
  - 25th Air Support Operations Squadron
  - 535th Airlift Squadron (C-17 Globemaster III)
  - 65th Airlift Squadron (C-37B)
  - 19th Fighter Squadron (F-22 Raptor)
- 15th Maintenance Group
- 15th Medical Group
- 15th Wing Staff Agencies

The 535th Airlift, 96th Air Refueling, and 19th Fighter Squadrons are each hybrid units joined with the Hawaii Air National Guard's 204th Airlift, and 199th Fighter Squadrons, respectively. These units are structured according to the USAF Total Force Integration (TFI) concept, and as such have both an active duty Commander and a Guard Commander. They share missions as well as equipment.

- Major Tenant Units
  - 154th Wing Hawaii Air National Guard
  - 515th Air Mobility Operations Wing

== History ==
=== Origins ===
In 1934, the Army Air Corps saw the need for another airfield in Hawaii when Luke Field on Ford Island became too congested for both air operations and operation of the Hawaiian Air Depot. 2,225 acres (9.00 km^{2}) of land and fishponds adjacent to John Rodgers Airport and Fort Kamehameha were purchased by the War Department from the Bishop, Damon and Queen Emma estates for a new air depot and air base at a cost of $1,095,543.78. It was the largest peacetime military construction project in the United States to that date and continued through 1941.

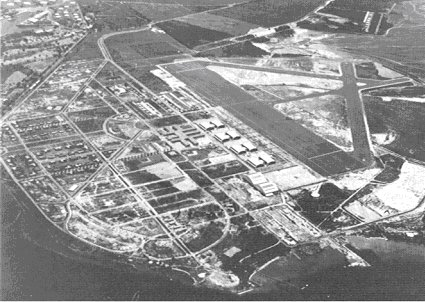
Hickam Field, 1940. Pearl Harbor Navy Yard is in the upper left corner and the main barracks is immediately left of the eight hangars in the center.

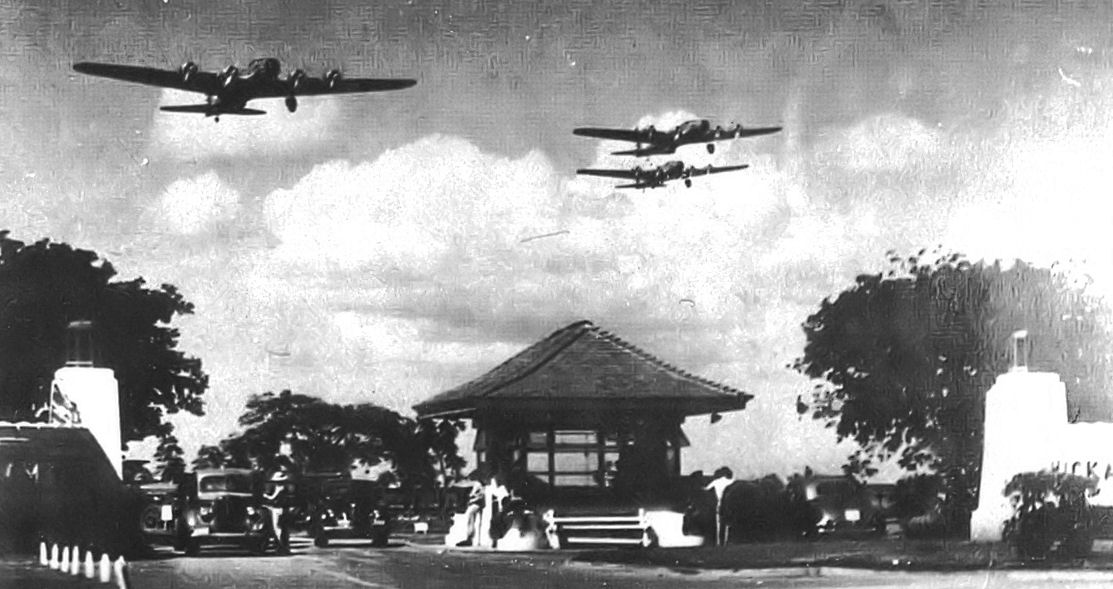
Boeing B-17D Fortresses of the 5th Bombardment Group overfly the main gate at Hickam Field, Hawaii Territory during the summer of 1941. 21 B-17C/Ds had flown to Hawaii in May to reinforce the islands' defense.

The Quartermaster Corps was assigned the job of constructing a modern airdrome from tangled algaroba brush and sugar cane fields adjacent to Pearl Harbor. Planning, design, and supervision of construction were all conducted by Capt. Howard B. Nurse of the QMC. The site consisted of ancient, emerged coral reef covered by a thin layer of soil, with the Pearl Harbor entrance channel and naval reservation marking its western and northern boundaries, John Rodgers Airport (HNL today) to the east, and Fort Kamehameha on the south. The new airfield was dedicated on 31 May 1935 and named in honor of Lt Col Horace Meek Hickam, a distinguished aviation pioneer who was killed in an aircraft accident the previous November 5 when his Curtiss A-12 Shrike, 33-250, hit an obstruction during night landing practice on the unlighted field at Fort Crockett in Galveston, Texas and overturned. Construction was still in progress when the first contingent of 12 men and four aircraft under the command of 1st Lt Robert Warren arrived from Luke Field on September 1, 1937.

Hickam Field was completed and officially activated on September 15, 1938. By November 1939 all Air Corps troops and activities—including most facilities such as the chapel, enlisted housing, and theater, which were dismantled and ferried in sections across the channel—had transferred from Luke Field with the exception of the Hawaiian Air Depot, which required another year to move. In early 1939 construction began on the main barracks, a single three-story nine-winged structure to house 3,200 men at a cost of $1,039,000. Personnel began moving into the barracks in January 1940, and by its completion on 30 September 1940, it was fully occupied and the largest structure of any kind on an American military installation. It included barber shops, a 24-hour medical dispensary, a laundry, a post exchange, multiple squadron dayrooms, and a massive consolidated mess hall at its center, and thus was dubbed the "Hickam Hotel".

Hickam was the principal army airfield in Hawaii and the only one large enough to accommodate the B-17 Flying Fortress bomber. In connection with defense plans for the Pacific, aircraft were brought to Hawaii throughout 1941 to prepare for potential hostilities. The first mass flight of bombers (21 B-17Ds) from Hamilton Field, California arrived at Hickam on 14 May 1941. By December, the Hawaiian Air Force had been an integrated command for slightly more than one year and consisted of 754 officers and 6,706 enlisted men, with 233 aircraft assigned at its three primary bases: Hickam, Wheeler Field (now Wheeler Army Airfield), and Bellows Field (now Bellows Air Force Station).

=== World War II ===
Hickam Army Airfield 1942 Yearbook

When the Imperial Japanese Navy attacked Oahu on 7 December 1941, its planes bombed and strafed Hickam to eliminate air opposition and prevent American aircraft from following them back to their aircraft carriers. Hickam suffered extensive damage and aircraft losses, with 189 people killed and 303 wounded. A flight of B-17s flying from California, unarmed and out of fuel, fell under attack as they attempted to land at Hickam, forcing some American bombers to land at other airfields. Notable casualties included nine Honolulu Fire Department (HFD) firefighters (three killed, six injured) who fought fires at Hickam during the attack; they later received Purple Hearts for their heroic actions that day in peacetime history, the only civilian firefighters awarded as such to date.

During World War II, the base became a major center for training pilots and assembling aircraft. It also served as the hub of the Pacific aerial network, supporting transient aircraft ferrying troops and supplies to—and evacuating wounded from—the forward areas—a role it would reprise during the Korean and Vietnam wars and earning it the official nickname "America's Bridge Across the Pacific".

=== Cold War ===
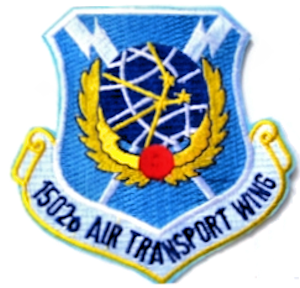
Emblem of the MATS 1502d Air Transport Wing (1955–1966)

After World War II, the Air Force in Hawaii consisted primarily of the Air Transport Command and its successor, the Military Air Transport Service (MATS), until 1 July 1957 when Headquarters Far East Air Forces completed its move from Japan to Hawai‘i and was redesignated the Pacific Air Forces (PACAF). The 15th Air Base Wing, host unit at Hickam AFB, supported the Apollo astronauts in the 1960s and 1970s; Operation Homecoming (return of prisoners of war from Vietnam) in 1973; Operation Babylift / New Life (movement of nearly 94,000 orphans, refugees, and evacuees from Southeast Asia) in 1975; and NASA's Space Shuttle flights in the 1980s and 1990s. Hickam is home to the 65th Airlift Squadron which transports theater senior military leaders throughout the world in the C-37B and C-40 Clipper aircraft. In mid-2003, the 15th Air Base Wing (15 ABW) was converted to the 15th Airlift Wing (15 AW) as it prepared to bed down and fly the USAF's newest transport aircraft, the C-17 Globemaster III. The first Hickam-based C-17 arrived in February 2006, with seven more to follow during the year. The C-17s will be flown by the 535th Airlift Squadron.

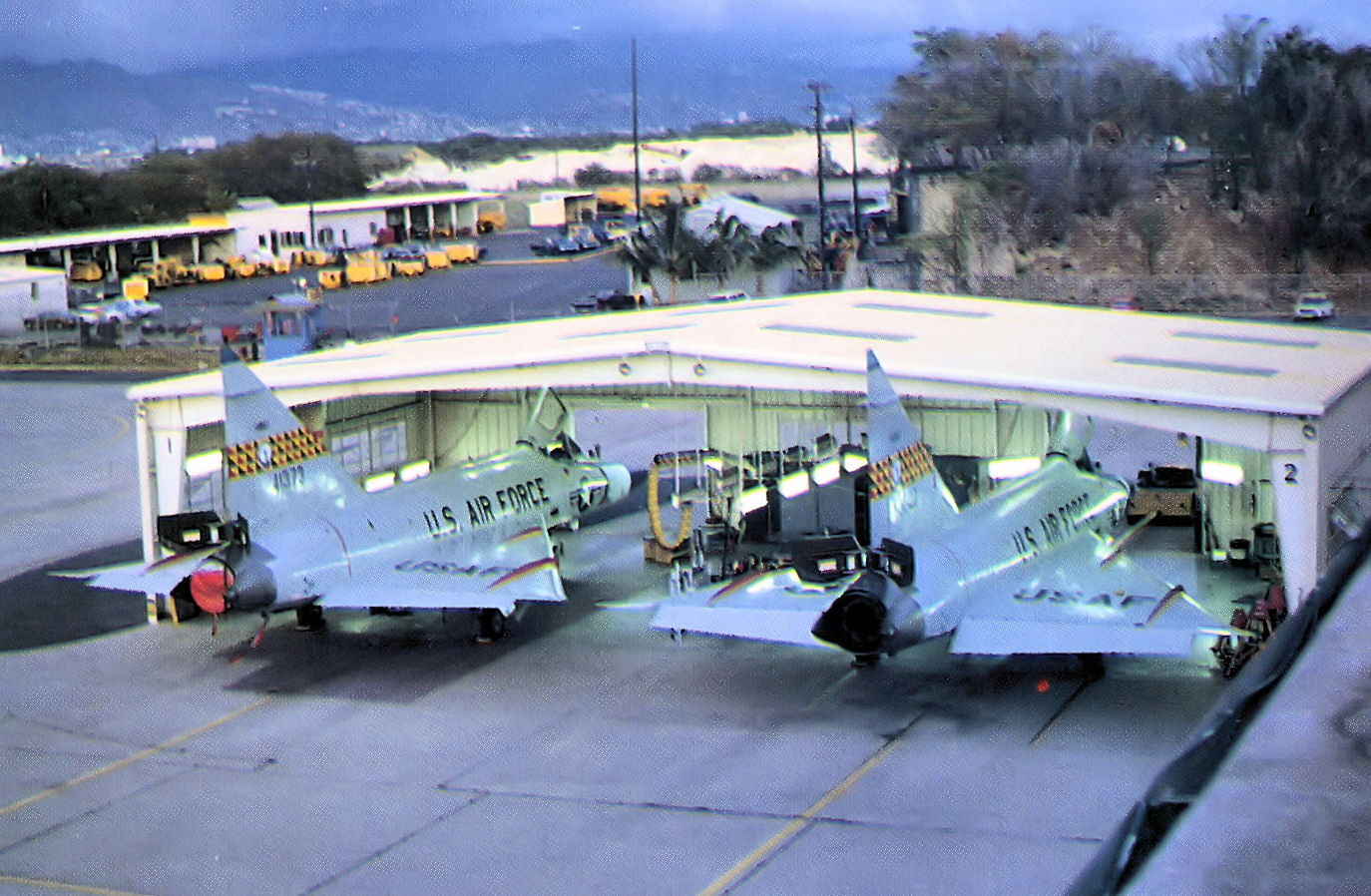
Hawaii ANG 199th Fighter Interceptor Squadron F-102s in maintenance hangar at Hickam, 1976 Convair F-102A-30-CO Delta Dagger 54-1373 identifiable, aircraft now on static display at Hickam.

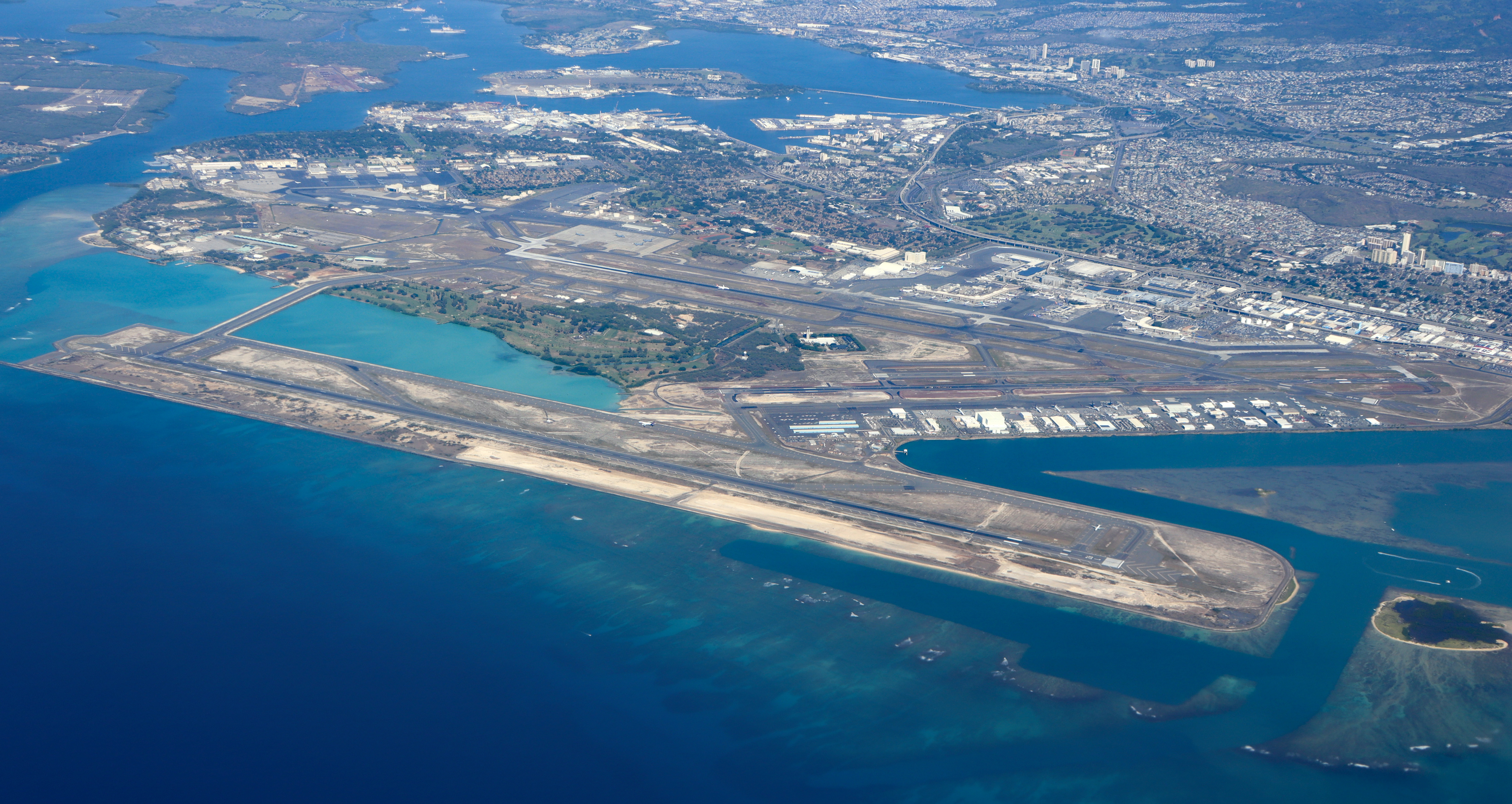
Aerial view of the Daniel K. Inouye International Airport, with Hickam Air Force Base visible in the upper left corner

On September 16, 1985, the Secretary of the Interior designated Hickam AFB a National Historic Landmark, recognizing its key role in the World War II Pacific campaign. A bronze plaque reflecting Hickam's "national significance in commemorating the history of the United States of America" took its place among other memorials surrounding the base flagpole. Dominating the area is a large bronze tablet engraved with the names of those who died as a result of the 1941 attack. Other reminders of the attack can still be seen. Bullet holes mark many buildings in use, including World War II era hangars and the base hospital., including the tattered American flag that flew over the base that morning. It is on display in the lobby of the Pacific Air Forces Headquarters building, whose bullet-scarred walls (the structure was a barracks and mess hall known as "the Big Barracks" in 1941) have been carefully preserved as a reminder to never again be caught unprepared.

=== Accidents and incidents ===
On 22 March 1955, a United States Navy Douglas R6D-1 Liftmaster on descent to a landing in darkness and heavy rain strayed off course and crashed into Pali Kea Peak in the southern part of Oahu's Waianae Range, killing all 66 people on board. It remains the worst air disaster in Hawaii's history and the deadliest heavier-than-air accident in the history of U.S. naval aviation.

=== Previous names ===
- Flying Field, Tracts A and B, near Ft Kamehameha, United States Army (Origins)
- Hickam Field, 21 May 1935
- Army Air Base, APO #953 (official designation, 16 May 1942 – 31 May 1946)
- Hickam Field, 1 Jun 1946
- Hickam Air Force Base, 26 March 1948 – 1 October 2010

=== Major commands to which assigned ===
- 1935–1940: Hawaiian Dept, United States Army
- 1940–1942: Hawaiian Air Force
- 1942–1944: Seventh Air Force
- 1944–1945: Army Air Forces Pacific Ocean Areas (Provisional)
- 1945: Seventh Air Force
- 1945–1946: Air Transport Command
- 1946–1949: Pacific Air Command
- 1949–1955: Military Air Transport Service
- 1955–1957: Far East Air Forces
- 1957–present: Pacific Air Forces

== Geography ==
Hickam Air Force Base consists of 2,850 acres (11.5 km^{2}), valued at more than $444 million. It was originally bounded on the north by Pearl Harbor Naval Shipyard, on the west by the Pearl Harbor entrance channel, on the south by Fort Kamehameha, and on the east by the airport complex. The original main gate is reached via Nimitz Highway (Hawaii Route 92) from Honolulu, and it shares its western terminus with the Pearl Harbor Naval Shipyard's main gate. This part of Nimitz Highway can be reached from the expressway Interstate H-1 (Exit 15) southeast from Halawa or west from Honolulu (Exit 15B) and from Kamehameha Highway (State Hawaii Route 99), the eastern termination of which is at Nimitz Highway.

The housing around the base is within the Hickam Housing CDP.

Hickam AFB is the location of Region 6 of the Air Force Office of Special Investigations.

== See also ==
- Marine Corps Air Station Kaneohe Bay
- List of airports in Hawaii
- Hawaii World War II Army Airfields
- Arnold W. Braswell
- HABS/HAER documentation of Hickam Air Force Base for a listing of the documentation of Hickam Air Force Base Base by the Historic American Buildings Survey
