= Kalaeloa Airport =

Airport in Kapolei, Hawaii, U.S.

Kalaeloa Airport Kahua Mokulele o Kalaeloa
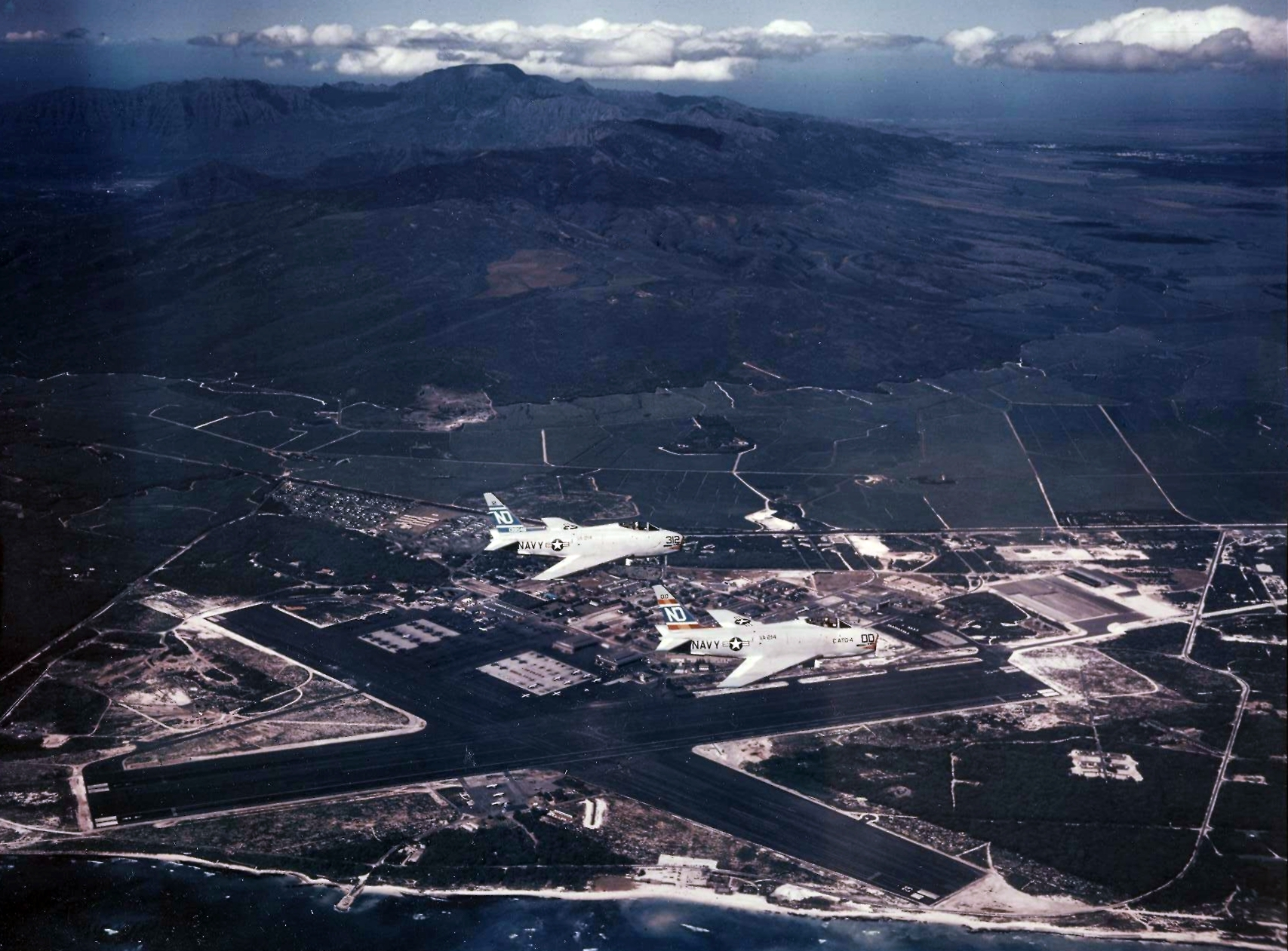
- Two North American FJ-4 Fury aircraft pass Naval Air Station Barbers Point (now Kalaeloa Airport) in January 1958.
- IATA: JRF; ICAO: PHJR; FAA LID: JRF

Summary
- Airport type: Public
- Owner/Operator: Hawaii Department of Transportation
- Location: Kapolei, Hawaii
- Elevation AMSL: 30 ft (9.1 m)
- Coordinates: 21°18′26″N 158°04′13″W
- Website: hawaii.gov/jrf

Maps
- FAA airport diagram
- Interactive map of Kalaeloa Airport

Runways
Direction	Length		Surface
Direction	ft	m	Surface
04L/22R	4,500	1,372	Asphalt
04R/22L	8,000	2,438	Asphalt
11/29	6,000	1,829	Asphalt

Statistics (ending 31 December 2008)
- Operations: 139,710
- Based aircraft: 22
- Source: Federal Aviation Administration

Kalaeloa Airport (IATA: JRF, ICAO: PHJR, FAA LID: JRF), also called John Rodgers Field (the original name of Honolulu International Airport) and formerly Naval Air Station Barbers Point, is a joint civil-military regional airport of the State of Hawaiʻi established on July 1, 1999, to replace the Ford Island NALF facilities which closed on June 30 of the same year. Located on the site of the developing unincorporated town of Kalaeloa and nestled between the Honolulu communities of ʻEwa Beach, Kapolei and Campbell Industrial Park in West Oʻahu, most flights to Kalaeloa Airport originate from commuter airports on the other Hawaiian islands. While Kalaeloa Airport is primarily a commuter facility used by unscheduled air taxis, general aviation and transient and locally based military aircraft, the airport saw first-ever scheduled airline service begin on July 1, 2014, with Mokulele Airlines operating flights to Kahului Airport on Maui.

It is included in the Federal Aviation Administration (FAA) National Plan of Integrated Airport Systems for 2017–2021, in which it is categorized as a regional reliever facility.

== Authority ==
Kalaeloa Airport is part of a centralized state structure governing all of the airports and seaports of Hawaiʻi. The official authority of Kalaeloa Airport is the Governor of Hawaiʻi. The governor appoints the Director of the Hawaiʻi State Department of Transportation who has jurisdiction over the Hawaiʻi Airports Administrator.

The Hawaiʻi Airports Administrator oversees six governing bodies: Airports Operations Office, Airports Planning Office, Engineering Branch, Information Technology Office, Staff Services Office, Visitor Information Program Office. Collectively, the six bodies have authority over the four airport districts in Hawaiʻi: Hawaiʻi District, Kauaʻi District, Maui District and the principal Oʻahu District. Kalaeloa Airport is a subordinate of the Oʻahu District officials.

== Airlines and destinations ==
Mokulele Airlines became the first airline to provide scheduled service at Kalaeloa when it began flights to Kahului Airport on Maui on July 1, 2014. After serving the airport for over two years and finding itself unable to make a profit doing so, the airline ended scheduled service at the airport in September 2016.

== Military usage ==
NAS Barbers Point was closed by Base Realignment and Closure (BRAC) action in the late 1990s, with the Navy aircraft, primarily P-3C Orion maritime patrol aircraft assigned to squadrons of Patrol Wing Two and SH-60B Seahawk helicopters assigned to Helicopter Antisubmarine Squadron Light 37 (HSL-37), relocating to Marine Corps Air Station Kaneohe Bay, now Marine Corps Base Hawaii, on the other side of the island.

CGAS Barbers Point, with its HC-130H Hercules and HH-65 Dolphin helicopters, was a former tenant command at NAS Barbers Point and continues to operate as the remaining military aviation presence at the airfield.

== Gallery ==
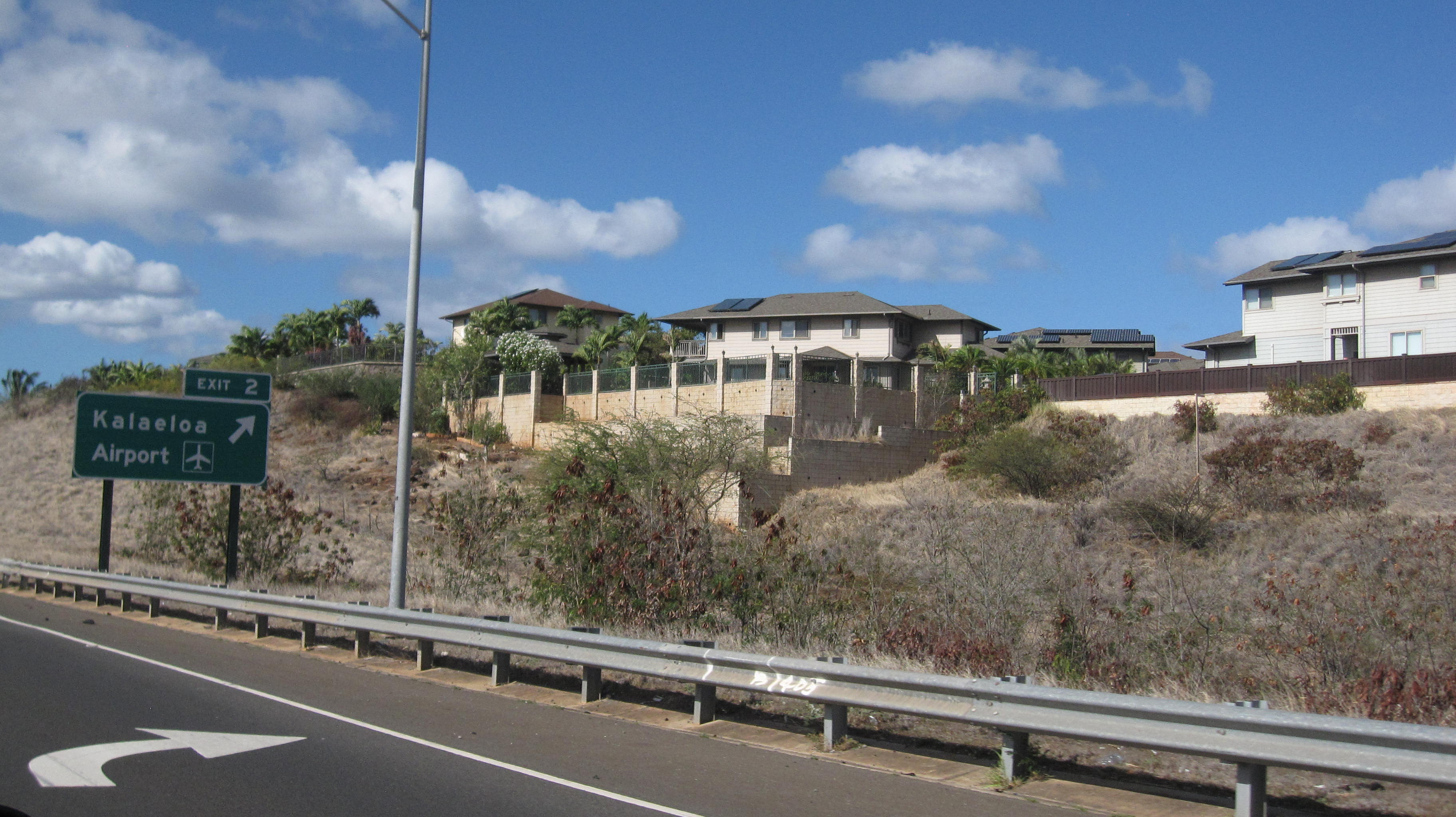
Sign for Exit 2 Kalaeloa Airport on Interstate H-1

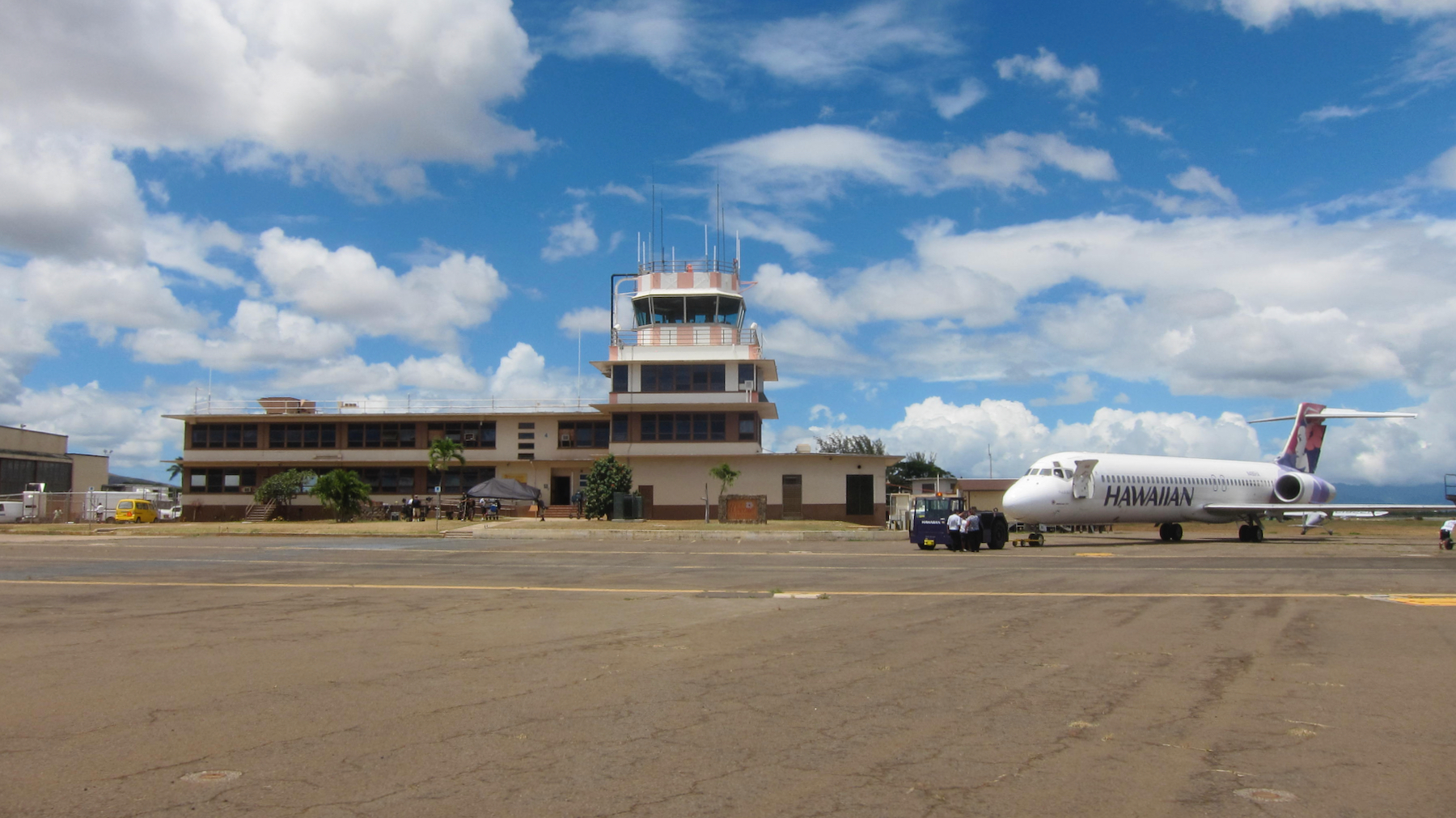
A Hawaiian Airlines 717 at Kalaeloa Airport

== See also ==
- HABS/HAER documentation of Naval Air Station Barbers Point for a listing of the very extensive documentation of Naval Air Station Barbers Point by the Historic American Buildings Survey.
- List of airports in Hawaii
- Solar Impulse 2 landed in Kalaeloa Airport on 3 July 2015, after achieving the longest non-stop solo fixed-wing airplane flight in history.
