= Naval Air Station Barbers Point =

Former airfield on Oahu in Hawaii, USA

- John Rodgers Field
- Kapolei, Hawaii in the United States
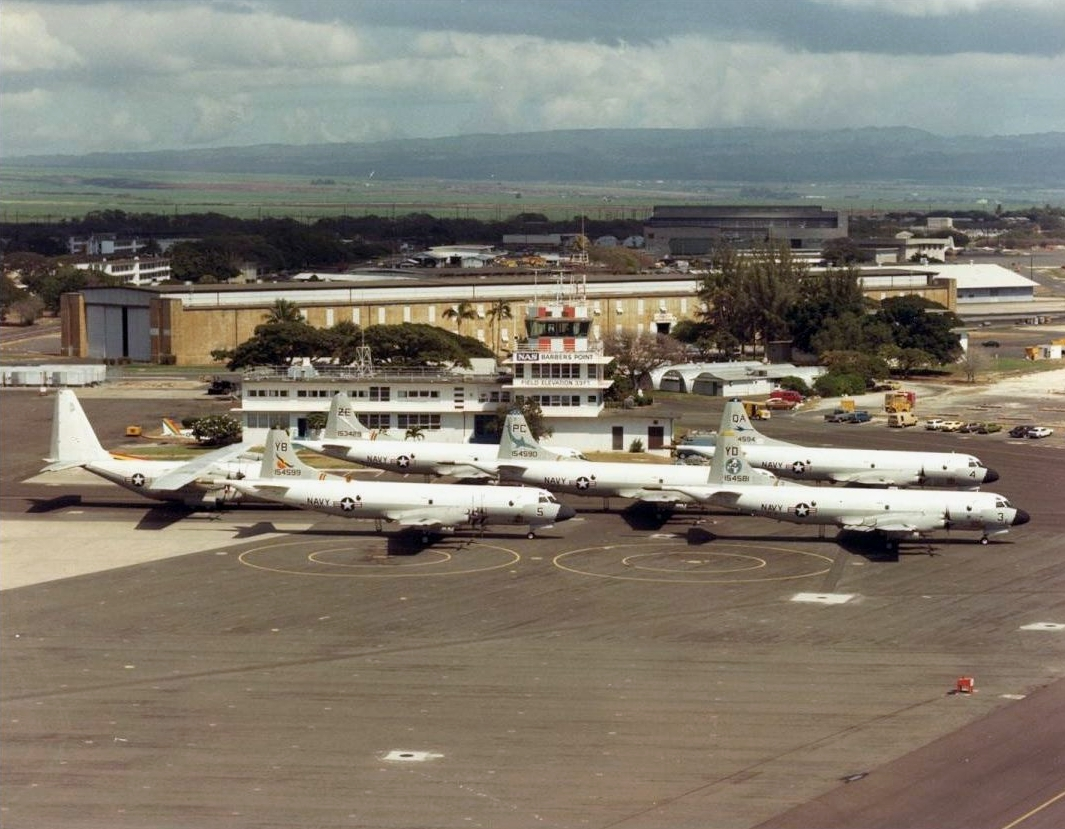
- Five US Navy P-3B Orions and a C-130F Hercules of Patrol Wing 2 at NAS Barbers Point during the 1970s

Site information
- Type: Naval air station
- Owner: Department of Defense
- Operator: US Navy
- Condition: Closed

Location
- Location on Oʻahu
- Coordinates: 21°18′26″N 158°04′13″W

Site history
- Built: 1942
- In use: 1942 – 1997
- Fate: Transferred to civilian use and became Kalaeloa Airport and film & TV studios

Airfield information
- Identifiers: ICAO: PHJR, FAA LID: JRF, WMO: 91178
- Elevation: 9 metres (30 ft) AMSL
Runways
Direction	Length and surface
4R/22L	2,438 metres (7,999 ft) Asphalt
11/29	1,829 metres (6,001 ft) Asphalt
4L/22R	1,372 metres (4,501 ft) Asphalt

Naval Air Station Barbers Point (ICAO: PHJR, FAA LID: JRF), on O'ahu, home to John Rodgers Field (the original name of Honolulu International Airport), is a former United States Navy airfield closed in 1999, and renamed Kalaeloa Airport. Parts of the former air station serve as a film and television studio for the Hawaii State Film Office.

== History ==
=== Attack on Pearl Harbor ===
On December 7, 1941, Barbers Point was one of the many targets attacked by the Japanese during the attack on Pearl Harbor. During the second wave, American pilots George Welch and Kenneth Taylor engaged Japanese aircraft over Barbers Point, shooting down two aircraft.

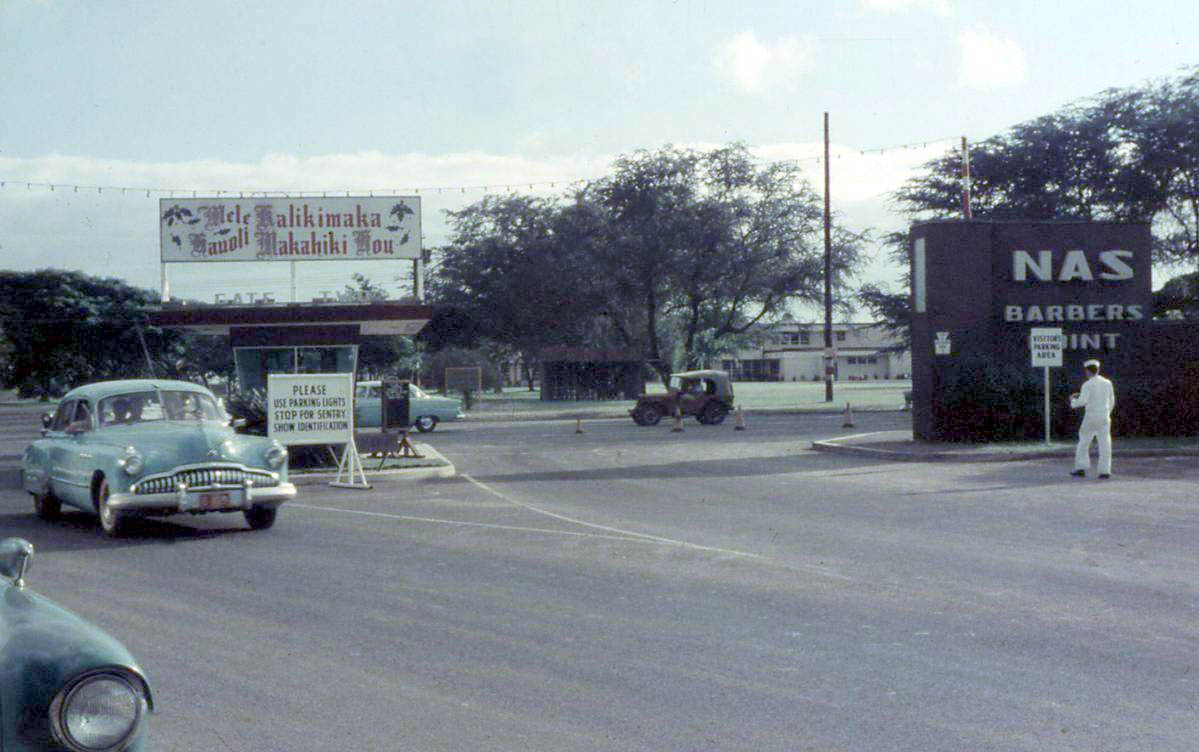
Gate at Naval Air Station Barber's Point as it appeared in December 1958

The Navy acquired the airfield in early 1943. At that time it consisted of two short runways and four hangars that were just two feet above hightide. A PNAB civilian contractor started work by bringing a dredge onto Keehi lagoon in February 1943. In April the military took over. The Army took over the dredging operation while Seabees of the 5th Naval Construction Battalion took over the airfield. When they were done there would be three runways. The Navy would turn the airfield into a major facility by sending Seabees from the 13th, 64th and 133rd Construction Battalions to do it.

=== Marine Corps Air Station Ewa ===
Marine Corps Air Station Ewa was adjacent to NAS Barbers Point. Due to lack of space to expand Ewa for jet aircraft operations, the Marine Corps field was closed and merged into Barbers Point on June 18, 1952.

=== Operation Dominic ===
In 1962 NAS Barbers Point was used as a staging base for Operation Dominic. Experimental nuclear weapons were loaded into two B-52s at Barbers Point and flown to points near Kiritimati (Christmas Island) where they were dropped in 24 test detonations. B-57 sampler aircraft that had flown into the mushroom clouds were later flown to Barbers Point and scrubbed down to reduce their radioactivity.

=== Army use ===
In 1972 the United States Army posted a CH-47 Chinook company, the 147th Assault Support Helicopter Company "Hillclimbers", supporting the Army's 25th Infantry Division and United States Army Pacific, and it was moved to the historic Wheeler Army Airfield, Schofield Barracks, for Hawaii Army National Guard use.

In May 1976 the Joint Casualty Resolution Center moved here from Thailand.

=== Closing ===
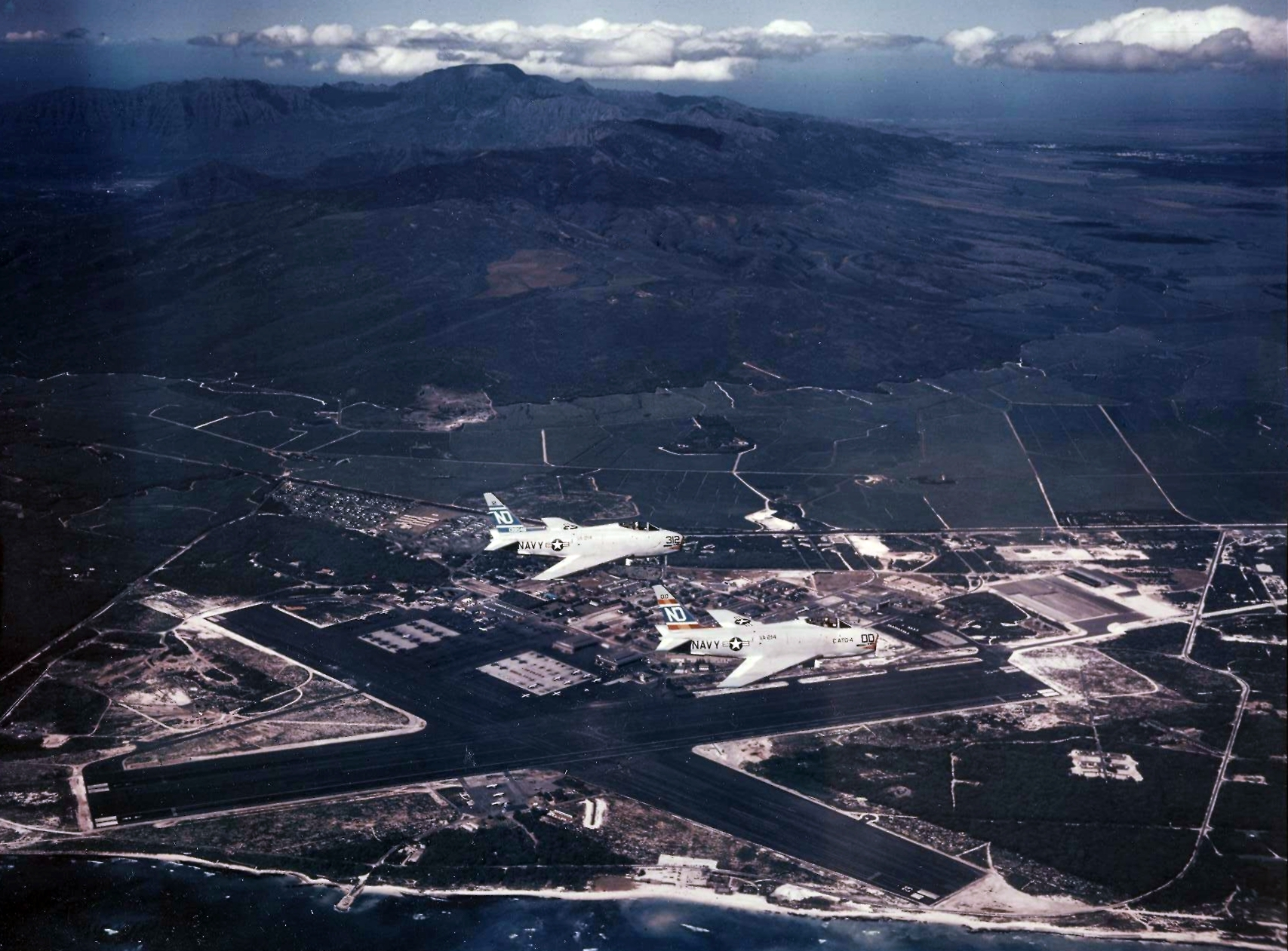
NAS Barbers Point in 1958.

NAS Barbers Point was closed by Base Realignment and Closure (BRAC) action in 1999, with the Navy aircraft, primarily P-3C Orion maritime patrol aircraft assigned to squadrons of Patrol Wing Two, relocating to Marine Corps Air Station Kaneohe Bay, now Marine Corps Base Hawaii, on the other side of the island.

Coast Guard Air Station Barbers Point, with its complement of HH-65 Dolphin helicopters and HC-130H Hercules aircraft, remained after the Navy's departure; Barbers Point is the only Coast Guard Air Station within the 14th US Coast Guard District.

With the closure of NAS Barbers Point, the present day Kalaeloa Airport / John Rodgers Field became home to Naval Air Museum Barbers Point, which preserved the history of the base and a collection of aircraft that reflected the US Navy's, US Marine Corps', US Coast Guard's and US Army's aviation presence on Barbers Point and in the state of Hawaii. The museum closed in 2020.

=== Production studio ===
By early 2017, the massive building which once served as the air station's aircraft intermediate maintenance facility had been leased by Navy Region Hawaii to the Hawaiian Department of Business, Economic Development and Tourism and the Hawaii State Film Office for use as a film and television studio. The Hawaii State Film Office had been interested in developing space on the former airfield into a filming studio to complement the department's first studio, the Hawaii Film Studio at Diamond Head in East Oahu. Donne Dawson, commissioner of the Hawaii State Film Office, stated that the new facility would "have all the components of a film office, such as office space for all departments, space for their props and wardrobes and a mill for set construction," and noted that, had Navy Region Hawaii not agreed to the lease, "there were not a lot of options" available to interested production companies beyond retrofitting warehouse space. ABC Studios and Marvel Television's Inhumans was the first production to use the newly created production facility.

== Environmental contamination ==
Barbers Point consists of at least 35 sites where soil and or groundwater were contaminated per the DOD. As of 2017, 34 had been cleaned up, according to the DOD. This does not mean that these sites are no longer hazardous, as many of these sites were put under long-term monitoring or other restrictions.

== See also ==
- Hawaii World War II Army Airfields
- Historic American Buildings Survey (HABS)/Historic American Engineering Record (HAER) for a listing of the very extensive documentation of Naval Air Station Barbers Point by the Historic American Buildings Survey
