= Coast Guard Air Station Barbers Point =

US Coast Guard Air Station in Kapolei, Hawaii

Coordinates: 21.301°N 158.071°W

- Coast Guard Air Station Barbers Point emblem
- Active: 1965 to present
- Country: United States
- Branch: United States Coast Guard
- Type: Air Station
- Role: Search and Rescue
- Size: 200 active personnel

Commanders
- Commanding Officer: Capt. Maurice D. Murphy

Aircraft flown
- Helicopter: MH-65E
- Patrol: HC-130J

Coast Guard Air Station Barbers Point is an air station of the United States Coast Guard located approximately 13½ miles west of Honolulu, at the Kalaeloa Airport, on the Hawaiian island of Oahu. Initially the Coast Guard established a base on the Hawaiian Archipelago in 1945, with a pair of PBY-5 Catalinas and one Grumman G-21 Goose. The air unit maintained supervision for the windward side of Oahu. In 1949 the Command moved to Naval Air Station Barbers Point, and in 1965 the unit received its current designation of Coast Guard Air Station Barbers Point. For 24 years the Sikorsky HH-52 Seaguard was the primary search-and-rescue helicopter, unit 1987 when it was retired and replaced with the Aérospatiale HH-65 Dolphin. The fixed wing component has consisted of various models of the C-130 Hercules which have been assigned to the unit since 1959. Currently, AIRSTA Barbers Point has four HC-130J Super Hercules in use, configured primarily as a long-range search and rescue, maritime law enforcement, and logistical support aircraft. It has the ability to airdrop rescue equipment to survivors at sea or on land. It can take off and land on short, unprepared airfields.

Today 250 officers and enlisted personnel maintain a continuous service for the Fourteenth Coast Guard District. Duties include aviation mission support for Search and Rescue, Marine Environmental Protection, Maritime Law Enforcement and Aids to Navigation. Since 1979, the unit has been awarded two Coast Guard Unit Commendations and four Coast Guard Meritorious Unit Commendations for exemplary service.

According to TorHoerman Law, the former Naval Air Station at Barber’s Point had polyfluoroalkyl substances (PFAS) contamination across the facility. According to a recent study, PFAS’s have been shown to cause penile shrinkage.
