= List of HABS/HAER documentation of Schofield Barracks =

The following is a listing of the documentation available for Schofield Barracks on the Hawaiian island of Oahu, through the public-domain Historic American Buildings Survey (HABS) and Historic American Engineering Record (HAER). See separate lists for Pearl Harbor Naval Base, Hickam Air Force Base, and the former Barbers Point Naval Air Station.

== HAER surveys ==
- Historic American Engineering Record (HAER) No. HI-81, "Schofield Barracks Military Reservation, Ku Tree Reservoir, Kalakoa Stream, East Range, Wahiawa, Honolulu County, HI", 19 data pages
  - HAER No. HI-81-A, "Schofield Barracks Military Reservation, Ku Tree Reservoir, Dam", 1 photo, 11 data pages, 1 photo caption page
  - HAER No. HI-81-B, "Schofield Barracks Military Reservation, Ku Tree Reservoir, Valve Tower", 5 photos, 13 data pages, 2 photo caption pages
  - HAER No. HI-81-C, "Schofield Barracks Military Reservation, Ku Tree Reservoir, Valve Tower Foot Bridge", 3 photos, 7 data pages, 2 photo caption pages
  - HAER No. HI-81-D, "Schofield Barracks Military Reservation, Ku Tree Reservoir, Spillway", 7 photos, 9 data pages, 2 photo caption pages

== HABS surveys ==
- Historic American Buildings Survey (HABS) No. HI-307, "Schofield Barracks Military Reservation, Wilikina Drive & Kunia Road, Wahiawa, Honolulu County, HI", 8 photos, 13 data pages, 2 photo caption pages
  - HABS No. HI-307-A, "Central-Entry Single-Family Housing Type, Between Bragg & Grime Streets near Ayres Avenue", 9 photos, 9 data pages, 1 photo caption page
  - HABS No. HI-307-B, "Corner-Entry Single-Family Housing Type, Between Bragg & Grime Streets near Williston Avenue", 7 photos, 8 data pages, 1 photo caption page
  - HABS No. HI-307-C, "Corner-Entry Single-Family Housing Type, Between Hamilton & Tidball Streets, & between Williston & Ayres Avenues", 6 photos, 7 data pages, 1 photo caption page
  - HABS No. HI-307-D, "Duplex Housing Type with Corner Entries, Between Hamilton & Tidball Streets near Williston AvenueI", 9 photos, 8 data pages, 1 photo caption page
  - HABS No. HI-307-E, "Duplex Housing Type with Corner Entries, Between Hamilton & Tidball Streets near Williston Avenue", 8 photos, 8 data pages, 1 photo caption page
  - HABS No. HI-307-F, "Schofield Barracks Military Reservation, Quadrangle I Administration Building, Williston Avenue between Wright-Smith & Reilly Avenues", 11 photos, 10 data pages, 2 photo caption pages
  - HABS No. HI-307-G, "Quadrangles I & J Barracks Type, Between Wright-Smith & Capron Avenues near Williston AvenueI", 18 photos, 7 data pages, 2 photo caption pages
  - HABS No. HI-307-H, "Quadrangle J Administration Building, Williston Avenue between Reilly & Capron Avenues, Wahiawa, Honolulu County, HI", 4 photos, 5 data pages, 1 photo caption page
  - HABS No. HI-307-I, "Quadrangle K Barracks Type, Between Wilson Street & Capron Avenue near Williston Avenue", 10 photos, 8 data pages, 1 photo caption page
  - HABS No. HI-307-J, "Quadrangle K Administrative Building, Williston Avenue between Wilson Street & Reilly Avenue", 5 photos, 9 data pages, 1 photo caption page
- HABS No. HI-544, "Ordinance Storehouses, South of the Intersection of Kolekole Avenue and Cadet Sheradin Road", 15 photos, 20 data pages, 4 photo caption pages
  - HABS No. HI-544-A, "Ordinance Storehouses, Building 2101, South of the Intersection of Kolekole Avenue and Cadet Sheradin Road", 7 photos, 17 data pages, 2 photo caption pages
  - HABS No. HI-544-B, "Ordinance Storehouses, Building 2102, South of the Intersection of Kolekole Avenue and Cadet Sheradin Road", 5 photos, 17 data pages, 2 photo caption pages
  - HABS No. HI-544-C, "Ordinance Storehouses, Building 2104, South of the Intersection of Kolekole Avenue and Cadet Sheradin Road", 5 photos, 17 data pages, 2 photo caption pages
  - HABS No. HI-544-D, "Ordinance Storehouses, Building 2105, South of the Intersection of Kolekole Avenue and Cadet Sheradin Road", 4 photos, 17 data pages, 2 photo caption pages
  - HABS No. HI-544-E, "Ordinance Storehouses, Building 2106, South of the Intersection of Kolekole Avenue and Cadet Sheradin Road", 6 photos, 17 data pages, 2 photo caption pages
  - HABS No. HI-544-F, "Ordinance Storehouses, Building 2107, South of the Intersection of Kolekole Avenue and Cadet Sheradin Road", 3 photos, 17 data pages, 2 photo caption pages
  - HABS No. HI-544-G, "Ordinance Storehouses, Building 2108, South of the Intersection of Kolekole Avenue and Cadet Sheradin Road", 5 photos, 17 data pages, 2 photo caption pages
  - HABS No. HI-544-H, "Ordinance Storehouses, Building 2109, South of the Intersection of Kolekole Avenue and Cadet Sheradin Road", 5 photos, 17 data pages, 2 photo caption pages
