= Port Allen Airport =

Port Allen Airport Kahua Mokulele o Port Allen
- IATA: PAK; ICAO: PHPA; FAA LID: PAK

Summary
- Airport type: Public
- Owner/Operator: Hawaii Department of Transportation
- Serves: Hanapepe, Hawaii
- Elevation AMSL: 24 ft / 7 m
- Coordinates: 21°53′49″N 159°36′11″W
- Website: hawaii.gov/pak

Map

Runways
Direction	Length		Surface
Direction	ft	m	Surface
9/27	2,450	747	Asphalt

Statistics (2008)
- Aircraft operations: 5,535
- Based aircraft: 10
- Source: Federal Aviation Administration

Port Allen Airport (IATA: PAK, ICAO: PHPA, FAA LID: PAK) is a regional airport of the State of Hawai'i. It is located 1 nautical mile (1.9 km; 1.2 mi) southwest of the unincorporated town of Hanapepe on the south shore of the island of Kauaʻi. Most flights to Port Allen Airport originate from commuter airports on the other Hawaiian islands by unscheduled air taxis and general aviation.

It is included in the Federal Aviation Administration (FAA) National Plan of Integrated Airport Systems for 2017–2021, in which it is categorized as a general aviation facility.

== History ==
The 1928 the Territorial legislature allotted $15,000 to establish an airport on Kauaʻi, and purchased land at its present site. The first flight from Port Allen Airport, by Inter-Island Airways, was in November 1929.

== Facilities and aircraft ==
Port Allen Airport covers an area of 179 acres (72 ha) at an elevation of 24 feet (7.3 m) above mean sea level. It has one runway designated 9/27 with an asphalt surface measuring 2,450 by 60 feet (747 by 18 m).

The airport has separate parking areas for fixed wing aircraft and helicopters and a public parking area. There are no other public facilities at the airport. Access to the airport is provided by Kaalani Road, which connects the airport with Lolokai Road and Highway 50. Adjacent to the airport are the salt ponds at Hanapepe where paakai is prepared. The principal planned improvements are the development of helicopter lease lots to the eastern end of the airport, construction of public comfort stations and minor roadway improvements.

For the 12-month period ending December 31, 2008, the airport had 5,535 aircraft operations, an average of 15 per day: 59% air taxi, 40% general aviation, and 1% military. At that time there were 10 aircraft based at this airport: 40% helicopter, 10% glider and 50% ultralight.

== Authority ==
Port Allen Airport is part of a centralized state structure governing all of the airports and seaports of Hawaiʻi. The official authority of Port Allen Airport is the Governor of Hawaiʻi. The governor appoints the Director of the Hawai'i State Department of Transportation who has jurisdiction over the Hawaiʻi Airports Administrator.

The Hawai'i Airports Administrator oversees six governing bodies: Airports Operations Office, Airports Planning Office, Engineering Branch, Information Technology Office, Staff Services Office, Visitor Information Program Office. Collectively, the six bodies have authority over the four airport districts in Hawai'i: Hawai'i District, Kauaʻi District, Mau'i District and the principal O'ahu District. Port Allen Airport is a subordinate of the Kauaʻi District officials.

== See also ==
- List of airports in Hawaii
