= List of HABS/HAER documentation of Hickam Air Force Base =

The following is a listing of the documentation available for Hickam Air Force Base, now part of Joint Base Pearl Harbor–Hickam on the Hawaiian island of Oahu, through the public-domain Historic American Buildings Survey (HABS). See separate lists for Pearl Harbor Naval Base, the former Barbers Point Naval Air Station, and Schofield Barracks.

== HABS surveys ==
- Historic American Buildings Survey (HABS) No. HI-164-C, "Hickam Field, Hangar 35-Air Corps Repair Hangars & Engineering Shop, Between Vickers & Hangar Avenue near First Street, Honolulu, Honolulu County, HI", 6 photos, 2 data pages, 2 photo caption pages
- HABS No. HI-164-I, "Barracks, Between Vickers and Hangar Avenues, From D to E Streets", 30 photos, 37 data pages, 4 photo caption pages
- HABS No. HI-164-P, "Officers' Housing Type A, 601 Boquet Boulevard", 8 photos, 8 data pages, 3 photo caption pages
- HABS No. HI-164-Q, "Officers' Housing Type B, 704 Julian Avenue", 11 photos, 8 data pages, 3 photo caption pages
- HABS No. HI-164-R, "Officers' Housing Type C, 208 Second Street", 11 photos, 8 data pages, 2 photo caption pages
- HABS No. HI-164-S, "Officers' Housing Type D, 111 Beard Avenue", 7 photos, 7 data pages, 3 photo caption pages
- HABS No. HI-164-T, "Officers' Housing Type E, 301 Julian Avenue", 12 photos, 9 data pages, 3 photo caption pages
- HABS No. HI-164-U, "Officers' Housing Type F, 602 Beard Avenue", 10 photos, 8 data pages, 3 photo caption pages
- HABS No. HI-164-V, "Officers' Housing Type G, 205 Seventh Street", 11 photos, 8 data pages, 3 photo caption pages
- HABS No. HI-164-W, "Officers' Housing Type H, 208 Sixth Street", 11 photos, 8 data pages, 3 photo caption pages
- HABS No. HI-164-X, "Officers' Housing Type J, 701 Beard Street", 11 photos, 8 data pages, 3 photo caption pages
- HABS No. HI-164-Y, "Officers' Housing Type K, 304 Sixth StreetI", 10 photos, 8 data pages, 3 photo caption pages
- HABS No. HI-164-Z, "Officers' Housing Type L, 702 Julian Avenue", 9 photos, 8 data pages, 3 photo caption pages
- HABS No. HI-164-AA, "Officers' Housing Type M, 113 Beard Avenue", 6 photos, 7 data pages, 2 photo caption pages
- HABS No. HI-164-AB, "Officers' Housing Type N, 204B Second StreetI", 7 photos, 7 data pages, 3 photo caption pages
- HABS No. HI-164-AC, "NCO Housing Type 1, 211 Tenth Street", 6 photos, 6 data pages, 2 photo caption pages
- HABS No. HI-164-AE, "NCO Housing Type 1, 211 Tenth Street", 8 photos, 7 data pages, 3 photo caption pages
- HABS No. HI-164-AF, "NCO Housing Type 2, 301 Eleventh Street", 6 photos, 7 data pages, 2 photo caption pages
- HABS No. HI-164-AG, "NCO Housing Type 3, 213 Tenth Street", 10 photos, 8 data pages, 3 photo caption pages
- HABS No. HI-164-AH, "NCO Housing Type 4, 212 Tenth Street", 8 photos, 7 data pages, 3 photo caption pages
- HABS No. HI-164-AJ, "NCO Housing Type 6, 212 Eleventh StreetI", 8 photos, 6 data pages, 3 photo caption pages
- HABS No. HI-164-AK, "NCO Housing Type 7, 210 Eleventh StreetI", 6 photos, 7 data pages, 2 photo caption pages
- HABS No. HI-164-AL, "NCO Housing Type 5, 206 Tenth StreetI", 11 photos, 8 data pages, 3 photo caption pages
  - HABS No. HI-164-AP, "Hickam Historic Housing", 12 photos, 13 data pages, 3 photo caption pages
- HABS No. HI-164-AQ, "Officers' Housing Type P, 403K Signer Avenue", 8 photos, 8 data pages, 2 photo caption pages
- HABS No. HI-164-AR, "NCO Housing Type 8, 212E Thirteenth Street", 9 photos, 7 data pages, 3 photo caption pages
- HABS No. HI-164-AS, "Fort Kamehameha Historic Housing, Along Worchester Avenue & Hope Street", 11 photos, 6 data pages, 3 photo caption pages
- HABS No. HI-164-AT, "Fort Kamehameha Officers' Housing Type Z, 19 Worchester Avenue", 14 photos, 10 data pages, 3 photo caption pages
- HABS No. HI-164-AU, "Fort Kamehameha Officers' Housing Type Y, 27 Worchester Avenue", 11 photos, 9 data pages, 3 photo caption pages
- HABS No. HI-164-AV, "Practice Bomb Loading Shed, Bomb Storage Road near the intersection of Moffet and Kamakahi Streets", 13 photos, 29 data pages, 2 photo caption pages
