= List of HABS/HAER documentation of Naval Air Station Barbers Point =

The following is a listing of the documentation available for the former Barbers Point Naval Air Station on the Hawaiian island of Oahu, through the public-domain Historic American Buildings Survey (HABS). See separate lists for Pearl Harbor Naval Base, Hickam Air Force Base and Schofield Barracks.

== HABS surveys ==
  - Historic American Buildings Survey (HABS) No. HI-279-A, "Naval Air Station Barbers Point, Marine Corps Air Station Ewa Aircraft Revetment Type, Bounded by Bismarck Sea, Brown, Tomes, & Hamilton Roads, Ewa, Honolulu County, HI", 10 photos, 7 data pages, 1 photo caption page
  - HABS No. HI-279-B, "NQuonset Hut Type 1 - 40' x 100', Between John F. Kennedy & Harrison Streets, south of Bismarck Sea Road", 9 photos, 5 data pages, 1 photo caption page
  - HABS No. HI-279-C, "ARMCO Hut, Hamilton Road between Moffett & Harrison Streets", 4 photos, 5 data pages, 1 photo caption page
  - HABS No. HI-279-D, "Air Raid Shelter, West of Moffett Street between Bismarck Sea & Hamilton Roadsphotos=5", 5 data pages, 1 photo caption page
  - HABS No. HI-279-E, "Quonset Hut Type 2 - 40' x 200', Norris Street south of Vinson Road", 5 photos, 5 data pages, 1 photo caption page
  - HABS No. HI-279-F, "Marine Corps Air Station Ewa Hangar, Cabot Road midway between Bismarck Sea & Vincon Roads", 6 photos, 6 data pages, 1 photo caption page
  - HABS No. HI-279-G, "Administrative Office Building, Lexington Avenue north of Midway Street", 6 photos, 9 data pages, 1 photo caption page
  - HABS No. HI-279-H, "World War II Command Center, Midway Street east of Lexington Avenue", 6 photos, 7 data pages, 1 photo caption page
  - HABS No. HI-279-I, "Control Tower & Aviation Operations Building, Near intersection of runways between Hangar 110 & Building 115", 7 photos, 8 data pages, 1 photo caption page
  - HABS No. HI-279-J, "Power Plant, Intersection of Mission & Midway Streets", 3 photos, 7 data pages, 1 photo caption page
  - HABS No. HI-279-K, "Telephone Exchange, Coral Sea Road north of Bismarck Sea Road", 10 photos, 7 data pages, 1 photo caption page
  - HABS No. HI-279-L, "Theater, Yorktown Avenue between Wasp & Saipan Streets", 11 photos, 5 data pages, 1 photo caption page
  - HABS No. HI-279-M, "Naval Air Station Barbers Point, Maintenance Hangar Type, Midway Street", 16 photos, 7 data pages, 2 photo caption pages
  - HABS No. HI-279-N, "Torpedo & Bombsight Shop & Storehouse, Midway Street between Enterprise & Ranger Streets", 7 photos, 7 data pages, 1 photo caption page
  - HABS No. HI-279-O, "Assembly & Repair Shop, Between Enterprise Avenue & Wright, Midway, & Langley Streets", 21 photos, 9 data pages, 2 photo caption pages
  - HABS No. HI-279-P, "Aircraft Storehouse, Between Midway & Card Streets at Enterprise Avenue intersection", 8 photos, 6 data pages, 1 photo caption page
  - HABS No. HI-279-Q, "Contractors' Warehouse, Between Midway & Ranger Streets", 5 photos, 6 data pages, 1 photo caption page
  - HABS No. HI-279-R, "Ready Magazine-1943 Type, Adjacent to Hangars 110 & 111, on or near Midway Street", 9 photos, 4 data pages, 1 photo caption page
  - HABS No. HI-279-S, "Ready Magazine-1944 Type, Off Midway Street adjacent to Building 115", 2 photos, 4 data pages, 1 photo caption page
  - HABS No. HI-279-T, "Dispersed Storage Warehouse Type, Along Boxer Avenue & between Franklin D. Roosevelt & Lexington Avenues, Nassau Street & Saratoga Place", 6 photos, 8 data pages, 1 photo caption page
  - HABS No. HI-279-U, "Officer House with Garage Type, Franklin & Saratoga Avenues", 28 photos, 7 data pages, 3 photo caption pages
  - HABS No. HI-279-W, "Anti-Aircraft Battery Complex-Small Gun Position, East of Coral Sea Road, northwest of Hamilton Road", 2 photos, 1 photo caption page
  - HABS No. HI-279-X, "Anti-Aircraft Battery Complex-Shelter, East of Coral Sea Road, northwest of Hamilton Road", 3 photos, 1 photo caption page
  - HABS No. HI-279-Y, "Anti-Aircraft Battery Complex-Large Gun Position, East of Coral Sea Road, northwest of Hamilton Road", 3 photos, 1 photo caption page
  - HABS No. HI-279-Z, "Anti-Aircraft Battery Complex-ARMCO Hut, East of Coral Sea Road, northwest of Hamilton Road", 4 photos, 1 photo caption page
  - HABS No. HI-279-AB, "Battery-Anti-Aircraft Gun Position, South of Point Cruz Road & west of Coral Sea Road", 3 photos, 1 photo caption page
  - HABS No. HI-279-AC, "Battery-Machine Gun Positions, South of Point Cruz Road & west of Coral Sea Road", 3 photos, 1 photo caption page
  - HABS No. HI-279-AE, "Shore Pillbox Complex-Type 1 Pillbox, Along shoreline, seaward of Coral Sea Road", 17 photos, 2 photo caption pages
  - HABS No. HI-279-AF, "Shore Pillbox Complex-Type 2 Pillbox, Along shoreline, seaward of Coral Sea Road", 3 photos, 1 photo caption page
  - HABS No. HI-279-AG, "Shore Pillbox Complex-Type 3 Pillbox, Along shoreline, seaward of Coral Sea Road", 4 photos, 1 photo caption page
  - HABS No. HI-279-AH, "Shore Pillbox Complex-Type 4 Structure, Along shoreline, seaward of Coral Sea Road", 2 photos, 1 photo caption page
