= List of HABS/HAER documentation of Pearl Harbor Naval Base =

The following is a listing of the documentation available for Pearl Harbor Naval Base, now part of Joint Base Pearl Harbor–Hickam on the Hawaiian island of Oahu, through the public-domain Historic American Buildings Survey (HABS) and the Historic American Engineering Record (HAER). See separate lists for Hickam Air Force Base, the former Barbers Point Naval Air Station, and Schofield Barracks. All locations are on the U.S. Naval Base Pearl Harbor, Pearl City, Hawaii, unless noted otherwise.

== HAER surveys ==
- Historic American Engineering Record (HAER) No. HI-5, "U.S. Naval Base, Pearl Harbor, Hangar 6, South End of Ford Island, Pearl City, Honolulu County, HI", 21 photos, 10 data pages, 2 photo caption pages
- HAER No. HI-6, "Pearl Harbor Naval Shipyard, Building No. 58, Pearl Harbor Shipyard, South Corner of Avenue G & Sixth StreetI", 4 photos, 3 data pages, 1 photo caption page
- HAER No. HI-9, "Berthing Wharf S378, Beckoning Point, Southeast of Cowpens Street, Ford Island", 8 photos, 5 data pages, 2 photo caption pages
- HAER No. HI-10, "Baker Docks B-11 to B-21, North of Pearl Harbor Shipyard", 21 photos, 40 data pages, 3 photo caption pages
- HAER No. HI-14, "Small Berthing Wharf, Ford Island", 6 photos, 4 data pages, 2 photo caption pages
- HAER No. HI-15, "Dry Dock No. 4, West of State Route 92, West of Nimitz Gate", 6 photos, 3 data pages, 1 photo caption page
- HAER No. HI-16, "U.S. Naval Base, Pearl Harbor"
- HAER No. HI-18, "Small Craft Berthing Wharf, Beckoning Point, northeast side of Waipio Peninsula", 3 photos, 4 data pages, 2 photo caption pages
- HAER No. HI-19, "Small Craft Berthing Facility, Hornet Avenue at Independence Street", 4 photos, 4 data pages, 2 photo caption pages
- HAER No. HI-20, "Berthing Wharf K-1, Kuahua Peninsula, west of Laffey Street", 2 photos, 3 data pages, 2 photo caption pages
- HAER No. HI-21, "Quaywall Y-3, Western tip of Kuahua Peninsula", 8 photos, 3 data pages, 2 photo caption pages
- HAER No. HI-22, "Finger Pier Structure, Ford Island west of Ranger Loop & southwest of Wharf F-9", 3 photos, 4 data pages, 2 photo caption pages
- HAER No. HI-23, "Signal Tower, Corner of Seventh Street & Avenue D east of Drydock No. 1", 18 photos, 7 data pages, 4 photo caption pages
- HAER No. HI-25, "Swimming Pool, Oakley Road & Cromwell Circle, Pearl City, Honolulu County, HI", 2 photos, 5 data pages, 2 photo caption pages
  - HAER No. HI-25-A, "Swimming Pool Filtration System Shed, Oakley Road & Cromwell Circle", 1 photo, 2 photo caption pages
- HAER No. HI-26, "Pier S4-S5, Between Quarry & Magazine Locks at intersection of Waterfront & Craig Streets", 4 photos, 4 data pages, 2 photo caption pages
- HAER No. HI-27, "Pier S8-S9, Magazine Locks at intersection of Waterfront & Clark Streets", 6 photos, 4 data pages, 2 photo caption pages
- HAER No. HI-28, "Kilo Wharves K10 &K11, West of Neosho Avenue, parallel to & North of Astoria Avenue", 8 photos, 5 data pages, 2 photo caption pages
- HAER No. HI-29, "Ward Field Grandstand, 750 feet southwest of Merry Point Landing, Pearl City, Honolulu County, HI", 4 photos, 5 data pages, 2 photo caption pages
- HAER No. HI-30, "Jet Engine Fuel Storage Tank, Lehua Avenue, Pearl City Peninsula, Pearl City, Honolulu County, HI", 3 photos, 6 data pages, 2 photo caption pages
- HAER No. HI-31, "Jet Engine Fuel Storage Tank, Lehua Avenue, Pearl City Peninsula, Pearl City, Honolulu County, HI", 3 photos, 5 data pages, 2 photo caption pages
- HAER No. HI-32, "Ship Fuel Storage Tank, South Avenue, west of Seventh Street, Pearl City, Honolulu County, HI", 3 photos, 5 data pages, 2 photo caption pages
- HAER No. HI-33, "Ship Fuel Storage Tank, South Avenue, west of Seventh Street, Pearl City, Honolulu County, HI", 3 photos, 5 data pages, 2 photo caption pages
- HAER No. HI-35, "Floating Dry Dock Quay, Hurt Avenue at northwest side of Magazine Loch", 14 photos, 15 data pages, 5 photo caption pages
- HAER No. HI-36, "Naval Submarine Base, Wharf S-21, Hurt Avenue at northwest side of Magazine Loch", 4 photos, 4 data pages, 2 photo caption pages
- HAER No. HI-37, "Naval Submarine Base, Berthing Wharves S10-S14, North Waterfront Road at Magazine LochI", 5 photos, 5 data pages, 2 photo caption pages
- HAER No. HI-38, "Naval Submarine Base, Berthing Wharf S1, South Waterfront Road along north side of Quarry LochI", 4 photos, 5 data pages, 2 photo caption pages
- HAER No. HI-39, "Boat Landing S370, Along Essex Street at Southeast shore of Ford IslandI", 4 photos, 5 data pages, 2 photo caption pages
- HAER No. HI-40, "BRAVO Docks, Merry Loch waterfront, north of Avenue A", 3 photos, 4 data pages, 2 photo caption pages
- HAER No. HI-43, "Bulk Fuel Storage Tank Type, Middle Tank Farm, south of North Road between Merry & Quarry Lochs", 5 photos, 5 data pages, 3 photo caption pages
- HAER No. HI-45, "Small Craft Berthing Piers, East end of Quarry Loch between Wharves M4 & S1", 5 photos, 5 data pages, 2 photo caption pages
- HAER No. HI-53, "Waterfront Facilities, Various locations throughout base", 16 photos, 27 data pages, 4 photo caption pages
- HAER No. HI-54, "Gasoline Wharf, Offshore, near the intersection of Hornet Avenue & Curtis Street, Ford Island", 3 photos, 17 data pages, 2 photo caption pages
- HAER No. HI-55, "Pier & Yacht Club Marine Railways, End of Lanakila Avenue", 7 photos, 12 data pages, 2 photo caption pages
- HAER No. HI-56, "Delaware Valley, Docked off Hornet Avenue", 9 photos, 10 data pages, 2 photo caption pages
- HAER No. HI-57, "Seaplane Runways-1933 Type, South shore of Ford Island, near Lexington Boulevard", 6 photos, 22 data pages, 2 photo caption pages
- HAER No. HI-58, "Seaplane Runway, Southern tip of Ford Island, near Lexington Boulevard", 6 photos, 18 data pages, 2 photo caption pages
- HAER No. HI-59, "Seaplane Ramps - World War II Type, Southwest and west shore of Ford Island, near Wasp Boulevard", 5 photos, 21 data pages, 2 photo caption pages
- HAER No. HI-60, "Ferry Landing Type, Halawa Landing on Ford Island", 12 photos, 25 data pages, 3 photo caption pages
- HAER No. HI-62, "USS MISSOURI, Battleship Row, Ford Island", 6 measured drawings, 21 data pages
- HAER No. HI-65, "Dry Dock No. 1, On northern shoreline of shipyard, near intersection of Avenue G & Sixth Street", 7 measured drawings, 41 data pages, 1 photo caption page
- HAER No. HI-66, "Dry Dock No. 2, On northern shoreline of Shipyard, between Dry Dock Nos. 1 & 3", 5 photos, 22 data pages, 1 photo caption page
- HAER No. HI-67, "Dry Dock No. 3, On northern shoreline of shipyard, west of Dry Dock Nos. 1 & 2, near the intersection of Avenue G and Sixth Street", 5 photos, 22 data pages, 1 photo caption page
- HAER No. HI-68, "Exterior Cranes, Waterfront Crane Track System", 19 photos, 57 data pages, 2 photo caption pages
  - HAER No. HI-68-A, "Exterior Cranes, 25-Ton Portal Crane Type, Waterfront Crane Track System", 4 photos, 15 data pages, 1 photo caption page
  - HAER No. HI-68-B, "Exterior Cranes, 50-Ton Portal Crane Type, Waterfront Crane Track System", 3 photos, 13 data pages, 1 photo caption page
  - HAER No. HI-68-C, "Exterior Cranes, Bridge Gantry Crane No. 1, Welding slab along Third Street, near intersection with Avenue G", 3 photos, 13 data pages, 1 photo caption page
- HAER No. HI-84, "Additional Piers and Quay Walls, S13 to S19, Northeast end of Magazine Loch", 22 photos, 33 data pages, 3 photo caption pages
- HAER No. HI-85, "Ford Island 5-Inch Antiaircraft Battery, Ford Island", 16 data pages
  - HAER No. HI-85-A, "Ford Island 5-Inch Antiaircraft Battery, Battery Command Center", 21 photos, 13 data pages, 4 photo caption pages
  - HAER No. HI-85-B, "Ford Island 5-Inch Antiaircraft Battery, East Gun Emplacement", 7 photos, 9 data pages, 2 photo caption pages
  - HAER No. HI-85-C, "Ford Island 5-Inch Antiaircraft Battery, South Gun Emplacement", 5 photos, 9 data pages, 2 photo caption pages
- HAER No. HI-86, "Ford Island Polaris Missile Lab & U.S. Fleet Ballistic Missile Submarine Training Center, Between Lexington Boulvevard and the sea plane ramps on the southwest side of Ford Island", 28 photos, 36 data pages, 3 photo caption pages
- HAER No. HI-87, "Aircraft Carrier Berthing Wharf, Northwest of Ford Island, near Saratoga Boulevard", 15 photos, 24 data pages, 1 photo caption page
- HAER No. HI-92, "Pier & Quay Walls, Kuahua Peninsula", 17 photos, 30 data pages, 2 photo caption pages
- HAER No. HI-95, "Carrier Moorings V1, V2, V3, V4, Near the southern tip of Pearl City Peninsula", 16 photos, 38 data pages, 3 photo caption pages
- HAER No. HI-96, "Quay Wall and Berthing Wharf, Bishop Point, on the waterfront near Pier No. 1", 5 photos, 18 data pages, 1 photo caption page
- HAER No. HI-123, "Red Hill Underground Fuel Storage System, extending from North Road to Icarus Way", 101 photos, 139 data pages, 20 photo caption pages

== HABS surveys ==
=== HI-1 through HI-99 ===
- Historic American Buildings Survey (HABS) No. HI-32, "U.S. Naval Base, Pearl Harbor, Headquarters, Commander-in-Chief of the Pacific Fleet, Intersection of Halawa & Makalapa Drives, Makalapa Administration Area", 16 photos, 27 data pages, 4 photo caption pages
- HABS No. HI-61, "Bachelor Officer's Quarters, Ford Island", 6 photos, 4 data pages, 2 photo caption pages
- HABS No. HI-62, "Bachelor Officers Quarters Mess, Ford Island", 3 photos, 4 data pages, 2 photo caption pages
- HABS No. HI-62-A, "Bachelor Officers Quarters Mess, Ford Island", 1 photo, 4 data pages, 2 photo caption pages
- HABS No. HI-65, "Naval Shipyard, Building 1E", 7 photos, 7 data pages, 1 photo caption page
- HABS No. HI-68, "Ford Island Administration Building, Bordered by Hornet Avenue, Liscome Bay Street & Essex Street", 8 photos, 15 data pages, 1 photo caption page
- HABS No. HI-85-A, "Ford Island 5-Inch Antiaircraft Battery, Battery Command Center, Ford Island", 21 photos, 13 data pages, 4 photo caption pages
- HABS No. HI-85-B, "Ford Island 5-Inch Antiaircraft Battery, East Gun Emplacement, Ford Island", 7 photos, 9 data pages, 2 photo caption pages
- HABS No. HI-85-C, "Ford Island 5-Inch Antiaircraft Battery, South Gun Emplacement, Ford Island", 5 photos, 9 data pages, 2 photo caption pages
- HABS No. HI-86, "Ford Island Polaris Missile Lab & U.S. Fleet Ballistic Missile Submarine Training Center, Between Lexington Boulvevard and the sea plane ramps on the southwest side of Ford Island", 28 photos, 36 data pages, 3 photo caption pages
- HABS No. HI-87, "Aircraft Carrier Berthing Wharf, Northwest of Ford Island, near Saratoga Boulevard", 15 photos, 24 data pages, 1 photo caption page
- HABS No. HI-92, "Pier & Quay Walls, Kuahua Peninsula", 17 photos, 30 data pages, 2 photo caption pages

=== HI-100 through HI-149 ===
- HABS No. HI-131, "Fleet Accounting & Dispersing Center, 178 Main Street", 6 photos, 6 data pages, 3 photo caption pages
- HABS No. HI-132, "Applied Instruction Building, Swan Street, near Lexington Boulevard & Gannet Street", 2 photos, 4 data pages, 2 photo caption pages
- HABS No. HI-133, "Grandstand, Long Way at Russell Way", 4 photos, 4 data pages, 2 photo caption pages
- HABS No. HI-134, "Hale Allii Housing Garage, Hale Alii Avenue & Avenue "D"", 2 photos, 4 data pages, 2 photo caption pages
- HABS No. HI-135, "Administration Building, Kuahua Peninsula, West of Jarvis Street", 2 photos, 3 data pages, 2 photo caption pages
- HABS No. HI-136, "Administration Building, Kuahua Peninsula, West of Jarvis Street", 1 photo, 3 data pages, 2 photo caption pages
- HABS No. HI-137, "Divers Shop, Kuahua Peninsula, West of Jarvis Street", 3 photos, 3 data pages, 2 photo caption pages
- HABS No. HI-138, "Electronics Shop, Kuahua Peninsula, West of Jarvis Street", 3 photos, 3 data pages, 2 photo caption pages
- HABS No. HI-140, "Operations Storage Building, Corner of Lexington Boulevard & Liscome Street", 4 photos, 4 data pages, 2 photo caption pages
- HABS No. HI-141, "Combat Vehicle Shop, Corner of Lexington Boulevard & Liscome Street", 4 photos, 4 data pages, 2 photo caption pages
- HABS No. HI-142, "Ammunition Handling Facility, West Loch along First Street at W3 Pier", 2 photos, 4 data pages, 2 photo caption pages
- HABS No. HI-143, "Ammunition Handling Facility, West Loch along First Street at W1 Pier", 3 photos, 4 data pages, 2 photo caption pages
- HABS No. HI-144, "Fuel Maintenance Shop, West of Jarvis Street on west tip of Kuahua Peninsula", 3 photos, 3 data pages, 2 photo caption pages
- HABS No. HI-145, "Operations Building, Ford Island, Enterprise Street near Intrepid Boulevard", 26 photos, 9 data pages, 6 photo caption pages
- HABS No. HI-146, "Storage-Tool Room, Kuahua Peninsula, West of Jarvis Street", 4 photos, 3 data pages, 2 photo caption pages
- HABS No. HI-147, "Overhaul Facility, Gilmore Street at Magazine Loch", 3 photos, 4 data pages, 2 photo caption pages
- HABS No. HI-148, "Storage Facility, Hunter Street at Magazine Loch", 3 photos, 4 data pages, 2 photo caption pages
- HABS No. HI-149, "Storage Facility, Gilmore Street at Magazine Loch", 4 photos, 4 data pages, 2 photo caption pages

=== HI-150 through HI-199 ===
- HABS No. HI-150, "Administration Building, Nimitz & Edge Streets, near Quarry Loch", 4 photos, 3 data pages, 2 photo caption pages
- HABS No. HI-151, "Garbage House, Nimitz Street & Dakley Road, near Quarry Loch", 4 photos, 4 data pages, 2 photo caption pages
- HABS No. HI-152, "Lualualei Radio Transmitter, Edison & Tower Drives", 12 photos, 7 data pages, 3 photo caption pages
- HABS No. HI-153, "Navy Exchange, First Street west of C Avenue, Lualualei; West Loch Branch", 3 photos, 4 data pages, 2 photo caption pages
- HABS No. HI-154, "Foundry Shop, Gilmore Street near Hurt Avenue", 3 photos, 4 data pages, 2 photo caption pages
- HABS No. HI-155, "Ship Fitters Shop, Gilmore Street near Hurt Avenue", 4 photos, 4 data pages, 2 photo caption pages
- HABS No. HI-156, "Ship Repair Shop, Morton Street between Coe & Craig Streets", 4 photos, 4 data pages, 2 photo caption pages
- HABS No. HI-157, "Bachelor Enlisted Quarters, Cromwell Circle", 9 photos, 5 data pages, 2 photo caption pages
- HABS No. HI-158, "Administration & Repair Shop, Clark & Morton Streets", 6 photos, 5 data pages, 2 photo caption pages
- HABS No. HI-159, "Maintenance Shop, Nimitz Street next to Millican Field", 3 photos, 4 data pages, 2 photo caption pages
- HABS No. HI-160, "Storehouse, Abele Street between Bole & Shane Streets", 3 photos, 4 data pages, 2 photo caption pages
- HABS No. HI-161, "Naval Ammunition Depot West Loch, Oahu, Dispensary, Near Avenue A between First & Second Streets, Lualualei, West Loch Branch Naval Magazine", 20 photos, 24 data pages, 6 photo caption pages
- HABS No. HI-162, "Brig, Neville Way near Ninth Street at Marine Barracks", 21 photos, 9 data pages, 5 photo caption pages
- HABS No. HI-163, "General Warehouse, Sixth Street near South Avenue", 3 photos, 4 data pages, 1 photo caption page
- HABS No. HI-165, "Nimitz Gate Sentry House, Nimitz Gate along Nimitz Spur", 8 photos, 5 data pages, 2 photo caption pages
- HABS No. HI-166, "Ordnance Operations Building, West Loch, First Street near Whiskey Wharves W1 & W2", 5 photos, 5 data pages, 2 photo caption pages
- HABS No. HI-167, "Gymnasium, West Loch, Arizona Loop", 6 photos, 6 data pages, 2 photo caption pages
- HABS No. HI-168, "Marine Barracks, West Loch, B Avenue near Arizona Road", 7 photos, 4 data pages, 2 photo caption pages
- HABS No. HI-169, "Open Enlisted Mess, West Loch, B Avenue near First Street", 2 photos, 4 data pages, 2 photo caption pages
- HABS No. HI-170, "Ammunitions Explosive Maintenance Building, West Loch, Third Street near D Avenue", 4 photos, 4 data pages, 2 photo caption pages
- HABS No. HI-171, "Riggers' Storehouse, Seventh Street near Bravo Pier 13", 2 photos, 4 data pages, 1 photo caption page
- HABS No. HI-172, "Theater, Moore Street at Nimitz Street", 5 photos, 3 data pages, 2 photo caption pages
- HABS No. HI-173, "Applied Instruction Building, Corner of Morton & Moore Streets", 5 photos, 3 data pages, 2 photo caption pages
- HABS No. HI-174, "Shore Intermediate-Maintenance Facility, Corner of Morton & Craig Streets", 4 photos, 3 data pages, 2 photo caption pages
- HABS No. HI-175, "Pilot Boathouse, South end of Jarvis Street on West tip of Kuahua Peninsula", 4 photos, 4 data pages, 2 photo caption pages
- HABS No. HI-176, "Barracks, Neville Way at Corner of Russell Way", 10 photos, 15 data pages, 1 photo caption page
- HABS No. HI-177, "Barracks, Russell Way at Corner of Neville Way", 4 photos, 4 data pages, 1 photo caption page
- HABS No. HI-178, "Galley-Mess Hall, Russell Way, between Long & Neville Ways", 3 photos, 7 data pages, 1 photo caption page
- HABS No. HI-179, "Barracks, Russell Way at Corner of Long Way", 2 photos, 4 data pages, 1 photo caption page
- HABS No. HI-180, "Barracks, Long Way at Corner or Russell Way", 2 photos, 5 data pages, 1 photo caption page
- HABS No. HI-181, "Barracks, Long Way, near Russell Way", 4 photos, 4 data pages, 1 photo caption page
- HABS No. HI-182, "Galley-Mess Hall, Long Way between Russell Way & Avenue E", 5 photos, 4 data pages, 1 photo caption page
- HABS No. HI-183, "Barracks, Long Way near Avenue E", 2 photos, 4 data pages, 1 photo caption page
- HABS No. HI-184, "Administration-Training Building, Pierce Street near Nimitz Street", 6 photos, 4 data pages, 2 photo caption pages
- HABS No. HI-185, "Fire Station, Nimitz Street between Moore & Morton Streets", 5 photos, 4 data pages, 2 photo caption pages
- HABS No. HI-186, "Administration Building, Nimitz Street near Morton Street", 5 photos, 4 data pages, 2 photo caption pages
- HABS No. HI-187, "Naval Magazine Lualualei, West Loch Branch, Officer's Quarters, End of B Avenue", 3 photos, 2 data pages, 1 photo caption page
- HABS No. HI-189, "Naval Magazine Lualualei, West Loch Branch, Warrant Officers & Civilian Quarters, B Avenue", 5 photos, 2 data pages, 1 photo caption page
- HABS No. HI-190, "Naval Magazine Lualualei, West Loch Branch, Detached Garage B1, B Avenue across from Buildings A, B, & C", 7 photos, 2 data pages, 1 photo caption page
- HABS No. HI-191, "Naval Magazine Lualualei, West Loch Branch, Warrant Officers & Civilian Quarters, B Avenue", 5 photos, 2 data pages, 1 photo caption page
- HABS No. HI-192, "Naval Magazine Lualualei, West Loch Branch, Administration Building & Storehouse, Main wharf area between wharves W1 & W2, north of First Street", 4 photos, 2 data pages, 1 photo caption page
- HABS No. HI-198, "Naval Magazine Lualualei, West Loch Branch, Explosive & Small Train Depot, Main wharf area between wharves W2 & W3, north of First Street", 5 photos, 2 data pages, 1 photo caption page
- HABS No. HI-199, "Naval Magazine Lualualei, West Loch Branch, Equipment Shed, First Street in main wharf area", 5 photos, 2 data pages, 1 photo caption page

=== HI-200 through HI-249 ===
- HABS No. HI-200, "Naval Magazine Lualualei, West Loch Branch, Latrine, First Street in main wharf area, Pearl City, Honolulu County, HI", 5 photos, 2 data pages, 1 photo caption page
- HABS No. HI-201, "Naval Magazine Lualualei, West Loch Branch, Explosive & Small Train Depot, First Street in main wharf area", 5 photos, 2 data pages, 1 photo caption page
- HABS No. HI-202, "Naval Magazine Lualualei, West Loch Branch, Inert Storehouse Type, Northeast of Fourth Street & D Avenue intersection", 11 photos, 2 data pages, 1 photo caption page
- HABS No. HI-203, "Naval Magazine Lualualei, West Loch Branch, Ammo Rework Building, North of Fourth Street near intersection with B Avenue", 4 photos, 2 data pages, 1 photo caption page
- HABS No. HI-204, "Naval Magazine Lualualei, West Loch Branch, Special Services Center-Gymnasium, Arizona Loop", 7 photos, 2 data pages, 1 photo caption page
- HABS No. HI-205, "Naval Magazine Lualualei, West Loch Branch, Barracks, Between B Avenue & Arizona Road", 10 photos, 2 data pages, 1 photo caption page
- HABS No. HI-206, "U.S. Naval Base, Pearl Harbor, Mine School Building, D Avenue near intersection of Third Street", 13 photos, 26 data pages, 3 photo caption pages
- HABS No. HI-207, "Naval Magazine Lualualei, West Loch Branch, Explosive & Small Train Depot, Main wharf area adjacent to Wharf No. 3", 4 photos, 2 data pages, 1 photo caption page
- HABS No. HI-208, "Naval Magazine Lualualei, West Loch Branch, Storage Building, Main wharf area adjacent to Wharf No. 1", 5 photos, 2 data pages, 1 photo caption page
- HABS No. HI-209, "Naval Magazine Lualualei, West Loch Branch, Stand-by Generator Building, Arizona Road", 3 photos, 2 data pages, 1 photo caption page
- HABS No. HI-210, "Naval Magazine Lualualei, West Loch Branch, Auto Hobby Shop, South of First Street", 6 photos, 2 data pages, 1 photo caption page
- HABS No. HI-211, "Naval Magazine Lualualei, West Loch Branch, Magazine Type 1, Fourth, Fifth, Sixth, & Ninth Streets", 3 photos, 2 data pages, 1 photo caption page
- HABS No. HI-212, "Naval Magazine Lualualei, West Loch Branch, Magazine Type 2, Fourth Place, Seventh & Eighth Streets", 4 photos, 2 data pages, 1 photo caption page
- HABS No. HI-213, "Naval Magazine Lualualei, West Loch Branch, Magazine Type 3, Fourth & Seventh Streets", 4 photos, 2 data pages, 1 photo caption page
- HABS No. HI-214, "Naval Magazine Lualualei, West Loch Branch, Inert Storehouse Type, East of A Avenue between Third & Fourth Streets", 9 photos, 2 data pages, 1 photo caption page
- HABS No. HI-215, "Naval Magazine Lualualei, West Loch Branch, Ammo-Explosive Maintenance Building, East of Third Street & D Avenue intersection", 5 photos, 2 data pages, 1 photo caption page
- HABS No. HI-216, "Naval Magazine Lualualei, West Loch Branch, Swimming Pool, Off Arizona Loop, east of Barracks (Building No. 9)", 2 photos, 2 data pages, 1 photo caption page
- HABS No. HI-217, "Naval Magazine Lualualei, West Loch Branch, Fallout Shelter Type, East of A Avenue near Second Street", 4 photos, 2 data pages, 1 photo caption page
- HABS No. HI-218, "Naval Magazine Lualualei, West Loch Branch, Railroad Barricade Type, Third Street & north of G Avenue & Fourth Street intersection", 3 photos, 2 data pages, 1 photo caption page
- HABS No. HI-219, "Naval Magazine Lualualei, West Loch Branch, Guard-Watch Tower Type, Near A Avenue between Fourth & Sixth Streets, Ninth Street & D Avenue intersection, & F Avenue", 2 photos, 4 data pages, 1 photo caption page
- HABS No. HI-220, "U.S. Naval Base, Pearl Harbor, Ammunition Wharf Type, Water's edge at north end of installation", 15 photos, 28 data pages, 5 photo caption pages
- HABS No. HI-221, "Naval Magazine Lualualei, West Loch Branch, Railroad Tracks, Various locations", 1 photo, 2 data pages, 1 photo caption page
- HABS No. HI-222, "Naval Magazine Lualualei, West Loch Branch, LST Wreckage, Submerged in waters of West Loch near Waipio Peninsula", 3 photos, 2 data pages, 1 photo caption page

=== HI-250 through HI-299 ===
- HABS No. HI-267, "Administration Building, North waterfront & Morton Street near Berth S-11", 7 photos, 5 data pages, 2 photo caption pages
- HABS No. HI-268, "Dispensary, Oakley Road near Pierce Street", 11 photos, 5 data pages, 2 photo caption pages
- HABS No. HI-269, "Emergency Vehicle Garage, Oakley Road near Pierce Street", 6 photos, 5 data pages, 2 photo caption pages
- HABS No. HI-270, "Periscope House, West waterfront & Craig Street near Berth S-4", 4 photos, 5 data pages, 2 photo caption pages
- HABS No. HI-271, "Rigger House, South end of Morton Street", 3 photos, 5 data pages, 2 photo caption pages
- HABS No. HI-272, "Telephone Exchange Building, Morton Street near Clark Street", 7 photos, 5 data pages, 2 photo caption pages
- HABS No. HI-273, "Flag Pole", 3 photos, 4 data pages, 2 photo caption pages
- HABS No. HI-274, "Alcohol Rehabilitation Center, Nimitz Spur between Sixth Street & Naval Station North Road", 8 photos, 4 data pages, 2 photo caption pages
- HABS No. HI-275, "Drum & Can Loading Facility, South of Arizona Street near Kamehameha Highway", 3 photos, 5 data pages, 2 photo caption pages
- HABS No. HI-276, "Ship Services Support Building, Between Kuakua & Hurt Avenues on Kuakua Peninsula", 4 photos, 5 data pages, 2 photo caption pages
- HABS No. HI-277, "Headquarters Building, North Road, between Fourteenth Street & North Road", 15 photos, 4 data pages, 5 photo caption pages
- HABS No. HI-278, "General Warehouse, Kuahua Avenue & Atlanta Street", 6 photos, 5 data pages, 2 photo caption pages
- HABS No. HI-283, "Administration Office, Intersection of Clark & Morton Streets", 3 photos, 5 data pages, 2 photo caption pages
- HABS No. HI-284, "Submarine Dive Tower, Intersection of Clark & Morton Streets", 12 photos, 6 data pages, 3 photo caption pages
- HABS No. HI-285, "Gas Station, South corner of Marshall & Nanumea Road", 4 photos, 3 data pages, 1 photo caption page
- HABS No. HI-286, "Bachelor Officer Quarters, Dealy Circle", 16 photos, 11 data pages, 6 photo caption pages
- HABS No. HI-288, "Magazine Building, Kuakua Avenue near Wharf S-20", 7 photos, 5 data pages, 2 photo caption pages
- HABS No. HI-289, "Magazine Building, Kuakua Avenue near Wharf S-19", 6 photos, 5 data pages, 2 photo caption pages
- HABS No. HI-290, "Chapel, Corner of Oakley & Nimitz Street", 14 photos, 7 data pages, 4 photo caption pages (Submarine Memorial Chapel)
- HABS No. HI-291, "Storage Facility, Hurt Avenue near Berth S-19", 4 photos, 5 data pages, 2 photo caption pages
- HABS No. HI-292, "Flammable Storage Facility, Intersection of Morton & Nimitz Streets", 3 photos, 5 data pages, 2 photo caption pages
- HABS No. HI-293, "Gymnasium Building, North Waterfront & Pierce Street near Berth S-13", 20 photos, 48 data pages, 5 photo caption pages
- HABS No. HI-294, "Intermediate Maintenance Facility, North waterfront near Berth S-12", 4 photos, 5 data pages, 2 photo caption pages
- HABS No. HI-296, "Theater, Hornet Avenue between Enterprise & Pokomoke Streets", 17 photos, 34 data pages, 5 photo caption pages
- HABS No. HI-297, "Officer Club Storage, Saratoga Boulevard between Lexingtion Boulevard & Princeton Place", 4 photos, 3 data pages, 2 photo caption pages

=== HI-300 through HI-349 ===
- HABS No. HI-301, "Diesel Oil Plant Foamite Building", 3 photos, 6 data pages, 2 photo caption pages
- HABS No. HI-302, "Navy Exchange, Pierce Street at Shane Street", 7 photos, 7 data pages, 2 photo caption pages
- HABS No. HI-303, "Navy Exchange Garage, Corner of North Road & Nimitz Street", 4 photos, 5 data pages, 2 photo caption pages
- HABS No. HI-304, "Magazine, East of intersection of Yorktown & Saratoga Boulevards", 3 photos, 4 data pages, 2 photo caption pages
- HABS No. HI-305, "Engine & Aircraft Overhaul Shop, Swan Street at Lexington Boulevard", 3 photos, 5 data pages, 2 photo caption pages
- HABS No. HI-306, "Printing Plant, South of Arizona Street near Kamehameha Highway", 6 photos, 12 data pages, 1 photo caption page
- HABS No. HI-308, "Smokedrum Storehouse, Northwest Intersection of San Jacinto, Ranger Loop & Wasp Boulevard", 3 photos, 4 data pages, 2 photo caption pages
- HABS No. HI-310-B, "Naval Computer & Telecommunications Area Master Station, Eastern Pacific, Radio Transmitter Facility Lualualei, Helix House No. 2, Base of Radio Antenna Structure No. 427, Makaha, Honolulu County, HI", 8 photos, 34 data pages, 1 photo caption page
- HABS No. HI-312, "Pump House, Lower Tank Farm, South Avenue", 4 photos, 5 data pages, 2 photo caption pages
- HABS No. HI-313, "Pump House, Middle Tank Farm, North Road", 5 photos, 5 data pages, 2 photo caption pages
- HABS No. HI-314, "Barracks, Beckoning Point, southwest of Sierra Mooring Platform", 3 photos, 6 data pages, 2 photo caption pages
- HABS No. HI-315, "Maintenance Ships-Spares Storage, Between Independence & Hammonds Port Streets", 5 photos, 4 data pages, 2 photo caption pages
- HABS No. HI-316, "Warehouse & Cold Storage Building, North corner of Pokomoke Street & Hornet Avenue", 4 photos, 4 data pages, 2 photo caption pages
- HABS No. HI-317, "Storage Facility, Kuakua Avenue near Atlanta Street", 3 photos, 3 data pages, 2 photo caption pages
- HABS No. HI-318, "Retail Warehouse, Fleet Landing Halawa, near Kamehameha Highway between Richardson Recreation Center & USS Arizona Memorial Visitor Center", 5 photos, 4 data pages, 2 photo caption pages
- HABS No. HI-319, "Boat Repair Shop, Hornet Avenue northeast of Ferry slip S371", 4 photos, 4 data pages, 2 photo caption pages
- HABS No. HI-320, "Boat Repair Shop, Hornet Avenue northeast of Ferry slip S371", 3 photos, 4 data pages, 2 photo caption pages
- HABS No. HI-321, "Laundry, Marine Barracks area, South Avenue between Seventh Street & Fuller Way", 4 photos, 6 data pages, 2 photo caption pages
- HABS No. HI-322, "Post Office, Avenue A near Eleventh Avenue", 5 photos, 6 data pages, 2 photo caption pages
- HABS No. HI-323, "Technical Materials Assembly Shed, North Road between Astoria & Quincey Avenues", 5 photos, 5 data pages, 2 photo caption pages
- HABS No. HI-324, "Waterfront Transit Shed, Corner of Astoria Avenue & Gaffney Street", 3 photos, 5 data pages, 2 photo caption pages
- HABS No. HI-325, "Waterfront Transit Shed, Between Northampton Avenue & Wharf K3", 4 photos, 5 data pages, 2 photo caption pages
- HABS No. HI-326, "Waterfront Transit Shed, Corner of Northampton Avenue & Simms Street", 3 photos, 5 data pages, 2 photo caption pages
- HABS No. HI-327, "Deperming Storage, Beckoning Point, EWA Plantation dirt road", 4 photos, 5 data pages, 2 photo caption pages
- HABS No. HI-328, "Fallout Shelter, Middle of Hancock Avenue", 4 photos, 5 data pages, 2 photo caption pages
- HABS No. HI-329, "Fallout Shelter, West end of Hancock Avenue", 4 photos, 5 data pages, 2 photo caption pages
- HABS No. HI-330, "Damage Control Building, Middle of Hancock Avenue", 3 photos, 5 data pages, 2 photo caption pages
- HABS No. HI-331, "Damage Control Building, West end of Hancock Avenue", 3 photos, 5 data pages, 2 photo caption pages
- HABS No. HI-332, "Special Hull Treatment Plant, West corner of Third Street & Avenue G", 3 photos, 4 data pages, 2 photo caption pages
- HABS No. HI-333, "Fire Station Personnel Support Storage, Long Way, southwest of Avenue E & Central Avenue intersection", 3 photos, 4 data pages, 2 photo caption pages
- HABS No. HI-334, "Enlisted Men's Barracks & Mess Hall, Marine Barracks, Neville Way", 17 photos, 28 data pages, 4 photo caption pages
- HABS No. HI-335, "Repair Shop Facility, Kuakua Avenue near Wharf S-20", 5 photos, 6 data pages, 2 photo caption pages
- HABS No. HI-336, "Filling Station, East corner of Central Avenue & Fuller Way", 4 photos, 5 data pages, 2 photo caption pages
- HABS No. HI-337, "Seaplane Hangar, Lexington Boulevard, south of Enterprise Street", 21 photos, 24 data pages, 5 photo caption pages
- HABS No. HI-339, "Fallout Shelter, Kuakua Avenue near Berth S-19", 6 photos, 5 data pages, 2 photo caption pages
- HABS No. HI-340, "Outdoor Swimming Pool, Corner of Liscome Bay Street & St. Lo Avenue", 6 photos, 7 data pages, 2 photo caption pages
- HABS No. HI-341, "Administration Office, Avenue E between Seventh & Eighth Streets", 3 photos, 4 data pages, 1 photo caption page
- HABS No. HI-342, "Administration Office Annex--Southeast Extension, Avenue E between Seventh & Eighth Streets", 17 photos, 29 data pages, 3 photo caption pages
- HABS No. HI-343, "Administration Office, Avenue E between Seventh & Eighth Streets", 4 photos, 4 data pages, 1 photo caption page
- HABS No. HI-344, "Administration Office, Avenue E between Seventh & Eighth Streets", 4 photos, 4 data pages, 1 photo caption page
- HABS No. HI-345, "Storage Facility, Seventh Street between Avenues D & E", 4 photos, 4 data pages, 1 photo caption page
- HABS No. HI-347, "Housing Area 1, Bounded by Kamehameha Highway, Plantation Drive, South Avenue", 4 photos, 16 data pages, 1 photo caption page
  - HABS No. HI-347-A, "Housing Area 1, Two-Story Duplex Type, Bounded by Kamehameha Highway, Plantation Drive, South Avenue", 7 photos, 10 data pages, 1 photo caption page
  - HABS No. HI-347-B, "Housing Area 1, Single Story Duplex Type, Bounded by Kamehameha Highway, Plantation Drive, South Avenue", 6 photos, 4 data pages, 1 photo caption page
  - HABS No. HI-347-C, "Housing Area 1, Fourplex Type, Bounded by Kamehameha Highway, Plantation Drive, South Avenue", 4 photos, 4 data pages, 1 photo caption page
  - HABS No. HI-347-D, "Housing Area 1, Sixplex Type, Bounded by Kamehameha Highway, Plantation Drive, South Avenue", 4 photos, 4 data pages, 1 photo caption page
- HABS No. HI-348, "Fire & Rescue Station, Intersection of Langley Avenue & Saratoga Boulevard", 3 photos, 6 data pages, 2 photo caption pages

=== HI-350 through HI-399 ===
- HABS No. HI-350, "Small Arms Ammunition Storehouse, North end of Kuakua Avenue", 5 photos, 6 data pages, 2 photo caption pages
- HABS No. HI-351, "Office Building, North end of Kuakua Avenue", 8 photos, 7 data pages, 2 photo caption pages
- HABS No. HI-352-A, "Naval Computer & Telecommunications Area Station, Enlisted Men's Barracks, West corner of Central Street & Midway Drive, Wahiawa", 5 photos, 6 data pages, 2 photo caption pages
- HABS No. HI-353, "Marine Guard Barracks, North Avenue at Nimitz Gate", 6 photos, 11 data pages, 2 photo caption pages
- HABS No. HI-354, "General Warehouse, Avenue D between Seventh & Eighth Streets", 5 photos, 3 data pages, 1 photo caption page
- HABS No. HI-355, "Naval Housing Area Makalapa, Northeast of Kamehameha Highway & Radford Drive intersection", 6 photos, 17 data pages, 1 photo caption page
  - HABS No. HI-355-A, "Naval Housing Area Makalapa, Senior Officers' Quarters Type A, 37 Makalapa Drive", 8 photos, 12 data pages, 1 photo caption page
  - HABS No. HI-355-B, "Naval Housing Area Makalapa, Senior Officers' Quarters Type B, 23 Makalapa Drive", 7 photos, 9 data pages, 1 photo caption page
  - HABS No. HI-355-C, "Naval Housing Area Makalapa, Senior Officers' Quarters Type C, North end of Makalapa Drive", 9 photos, 14 data pages, 1 photo caption page
  - HABS No. HI-355-D, "Naval Housing Area Makalapa, Senior Officers' Quarters Type D, 29 Makalapa Drive", 7 photos, 10 data pages, 1 photo caption page
  - HABS No. HI-355-E, "Naval Housing Area Makalapa, Senior Officers' Quarters Type E, 37 Halawa Drive", 8 photos, 5 data pages, 1 photo caption page
  - HABS No. HI-355-F, "Naval Housing Area Makalapa, Staff Officers' Mess, 41 Makalapa Drive", 6 photos, 6 data pages, 1 photo caption page
  - HABS No. HI-355-G, "Naval Housing Area Makalapa, Junior Bachelor Officers' Mess, 43 Makalapa Drive", 6 photos, 10 data pages, 1 photo caption page
  - HABS No. HI-355-H, "Naval Housing Area Makalapa, Transportation Department Office, 47 Makalapa Drive", 8 photos, 9 data pages, 1 photo caption page
  - HABS No. HI-355-I, "Naval Housing Area Makalapa, Junior Officers' Quarters Type I, Halawa, Makalapa, & Midway Drives, & Betio & Makin Places", 7 photos, 8 data pages, 1 photo caption page
  - HABS No. HI-355-J, "Naval Housing Area Makalapa, Junior Officers' Quarters Type J, Makin Place, & Halawa, Makalapa, & Midway Drives", 10 photos, 10 data pages, 1 photo caption page
  - HABS No. HI-355-K, "Naval Housing Area Makalapa, Junior Officers' Quarters Type K, Makin Place, & Halawa, Makalapa, & Midway Drives", 8 photos, 9 data pages, 1 photo caption page
  - HABS No. HI-355-L, "Naval Housing Area Makalapa, Angle Three-Bedroom Duplex Type M, Kamakani & Samoa Places, & Makalapa Drive", 13 photos, 14 data pages, 2 photo caption pages
  - HABS No. HI-355-M, "Naval Housing Area Makalapa, Angle Two-Bedroom Duplex Type N, Kamakani Place & Makalapa Drive", 9 photos, 11 data pages, 2 photo caption pages
  - HABS No. HI-355-N, "Naval Housing Area Makalapa, Straight Two-Bedroom Duplex Type O, South end of Kamakani Place", 9 photos, 12 data pages, 2 photo caption pages
  - HABS No. HI-355-O, "Naval Housing Area Makalapa, Carport Type with Rear Storage Areas, Makalapa, Halawa& Midway Drives, & Makin Place", 2 photos, 5 data pages, 1 photo caption page
  - HABS No. HI-355-P, "Naval Housing Area Makalapa, Carport Type with Central Storage Rooms, Various locations throughout housing area", 1 photo, 4 data pages, 1 photo caption page
- HABS No. HI-356, "Naval Housing Area Hospital Point, Along First Avenue to west of & along Ford Island Way", 4 photos, 14 data pages, 2 photo caption pages
  - HABS No. HI-356-A, "Naval Housing Area Hospital Point, Surgeon's Quarters Type, 2-5 First Street", 8 photos, 12 data pages, 1 photo caption page
  - Historic American Buildings Survey (HABS) No. HI-356-B, "Naval Housing Area Hospital Point, Radio Station Duplex for Chief Operators' Quarters, 2-3 Ford Island Way"
  - HABS No. HI-356-C, "Naval Housing Area Hospital Point, Quarters for Officer in Charge of Radio Station, 1 Ford Island Way", 9 photos, 9 data pages, 2 photo caption pages
  - HABS No. HI-356-D, "Naval Housing Area Hospital Point, Commanding Officer's Quarters, 6-8 First Street", 16 photos, 14 data pages, 2 photo caption pages
  - HABS No. HI-356-E, "Naval Housing Area Hospital Point, Civilian Employees' Quarters, 1 First Street", 3 photos, 10 data pages, 1 photo caption page
  - HABS No. HI-356-F, "Naval Housing Area Hospital Point, Pharmacist's Quarters Type, 13-16 First Street", 7 photos, 7 data pages, 1 photo caption page
  - HABS No. HI-356-G, "Naval Housing Area Hospital Point, Junior Officer's Quarters Type, 11-12 First Street", 7 photos, 8 data pages, 1 photo caption page
  - HABS No. HI-356-H, "Naval Housing Area Hospital Point, Chapel & Duplex Quarters, 9 First Street", 4 photos, 7 data pages, 1 photo caption page
  - HABS No. HI-356-I, "Naval Housing Area Hospital Point, Surgeons' Garage, Intersection of Service Road & driveway behind First Street", 1 photo, 4 data pages, 1 photo caption page
  - HABS No. HI-356-J, "Naval Housing Area Hospital Point, Pharmacists' Garage Type, First Street near Kean Road", 1 photo, 6 data pages, 1 photo caption page
  - HABS No. HI-356-K, "Naval Housing Area Hospital Point, Junior Officers' Garage, First Street west of Hospital Way", 1 photo, 6 data pages, 1 photo caption page
- HABS No. HI-357, "Naval Housing Area Hale Alii, Hale Alii Avenue, Eighth Street, & Avenue D", 5 photos, 10 data pages, 1 photo caption page
  - HABS No. HI-357-A, "Naval Housing Area Hale Alii, Commandant's Quarters, 6 Hale Alii Avenue", 13 photos, 13 data pages, 1 photo caption page
  - HABS No. HI-357-B, "Naval Housing Area Hale Alii, Officers' Quarters Two Story Type, 1-5, 7-8 Hale Alii Avenue", 11 photos, 11 data pages, 2 photo caption pages
  - HABS No. HI-357-C, "Naval Housing Area Hale Alii, Junior Officers' Quarters Type, 9-10 Hale Alii Avenue, 1-2 Eighth Street", 10 photos, 8 data pages, 1 photo caption page
  - HABS No. HI-357-D, "Naval Housing Area Hale Alii, Officers' Quarters Duplex Type, 1-2 Avenue D", 7 photos, 13 data pages, 1 photo caption page
  - HABS No. HI-357-E, "Naval Housing Area Hale Alii, Shared Carport Type with Storerooms, End of driveways off Hale Alii Avenue", 2 photos, 7 data pages, 1 photo caption page
  - HABS No. HI-357-F, "Naval Housing Area Hale Alii, Shared Outbuilding Type with Carports, Off Eighth Street on either side of Avenue D", 3 photos, 7 data pages, 1 photo caption page
- HABS No. HI-358, "Naval Housing Area Pearl City Peninsula, Bounded by Lanakila & Laniwai Avenues, Kaiapo Canal & shoreline", 3 photos, 18 data pages, 1 photo caption page
  - HABS No. HI-358-A, "Naval Housing Area Pearl City Peninsula, MacIntyre House, 364 Laniwai Avenue", 5 photos, 9 data pages, 1 photo caption page
  - HABS No. HI-358-B, "Naval Housing Area Pearl City Peninsula, Uyehara House & Garage, 1038 Ashley Avenue", 12 photos, 14 data pages, 1 photo caption page
  - HABS No. HI-358-C, "Naval Housing Area Pearl City Peninsula, House & Garage, 346 Laniwai Avenue", 9 photos, 8 data pages, 1 photo caption page
  - HABS No. HI-358-D, "Naval Housing Area Pearl City Peninsula, Defense Housing Project Type 47, 310 & 318 Laniwai Avenues", 8 photos, 12 data pages, 1 photo caption page
  - HABS No. HI-358-E, "Naval Housing Area Pearl City Peninsula, Defense Housing Project Type 47A, 308 Laniwai Avenue", 5 photos, 20 data pages, 2 photo caption pages
- HABS No. HI-359, "Shipfitters, Metal Workers & Boiler Shop, Lake Erie Street at Russell Avenue", 5 photos, 20 data pages, 2 photo caption pages
- HABS No. HI-360, "Pipe & Copper Shop Extension, Russell Avenue between Lake Erie & Port Royal Streets", 5 photos, 17 data pages, 2 photo caption pages
- HABS No. HI-361, "Practice Bomb Storehouse, Yorktown Boulevard northeast of Saratoga Boulevard", 5 photos, 9 data pages, 2 photo caption pages
- HABS No. HI-362, "Battery Boyd, Between San Jacinto Street & Ranger Loop", 5 photos, 14 data pages, 2 photo caption pages
- HABS No. HI-363, "Pyrotechnic Magazine, Kingfisher Street flanked by Ranger Loop & Wasp Boulevard", 3 photos, 10 data pages, 2 photo caption pages
- HABS No. HI-364, "Small Arms Magazine Type, Wasp Boulevard between Kingfisher & Avocet Streets", 5 photos, 9 data pages, 2 photo caption pages
- HABS No. HI-365, "Seaplane Hangar, Lexington Boulevard west of Gannet Street", 6 photos, 16 data pages, 2 photo caption pages
- HABS No. HI-366, "Army Hangar, Wasp Boulevard at north intersection with Ranger Loop", 4 photos, 10 data pages, 2 photo caption pages
- HABS No. HI-367, "Dispensary & Casualty Station, Bishop Point, northwest of intersection of Vickers Avenue & Fort Kamehameha Road", 4 photos, 12 data pages, 2 photo caption pages
- HABS No. HI-368, "Link Trainer Building, Near intersection of Enterprise Street & Intrepid Boulevard", 4 photos, 9 data pages, 2 photo caption pages
- HABS No. HI-369, "Fleet Radio Unit Pacific Additional Office Building, Makalapa Administrative Area, between Makalapa Drive & Luapele Road", 2 photos, 10 data pages, 2 photo caption pages
- HABS No. HI-370, "Engine Test Building, Southeast of Wasp Boulevard", 8 photos, 12 data pages, 2 photo caption pages
- HABS No. HI-371, "Boiler House, Hancock Avenue near intersection with Saratoga Boulevard", 3 photos, 6 data pages, 2 photo caption pages
- HABS No. HI-372, "Fleet Squadron Storehouse, Avocet Street between Wasp Boulevard & Ranger Loop", 5 photos, 14 data pages, 2 photo caption pages
- HABS No. HI-373, "Storehouse, Hornet Avenue between Hammonds Port & Independence Streets", 5 photos, 14 data pages, 2 photo caption pages
- HABS No. HI-374, "Bombsight & Torpedo Storehouse & Workshop, Southwest of Gannet Street", 6 photos, 9 data pages, 2 photo caption pages
- HABS No. HI-375, "Fire Station, Liscome Bay Street near Hornet Avenue", 7 photos, 15 data pages, 2 photo caption pages
- HABS No. HI-376, "Storehouse Extension, Gannet Street between Lexington Boulevard & parking lot", 5 photos, 18 data pages, 2 photo caption pages
- HABS No. HI-377, "Section Base Storehouse, Bishop Point, between Fort Kamehameha Road & Quaywall", 3 photos, 13 data pages, 2 photo caption pages
- HABS No. HI-378, "Aircraft Storehouse, Lexington Boulevard, Liscombe Bay Street & St. Lo Avenue", 5 photos, 10 data pages, 2 photo caption pages
- HABS No. HI-379, "Storehouse, Liscome Bay Street between Gannet Street & Lexington Boulevard", 4 photos, 12 data pages, 2 photo caption pages
- HABS No. HI-380, "Officers' Swimming Pool, Saratoga Boulevard between Princeton Place & Lexington Boulevard", 3 photos, 9 data pages, 2 photo caption pages
- HABS No. HI-381, "Fleet Air Base Dispensary, Hornet Avenue between Essex & Enterprise Streets", 9 photos, 15 data pages, 2 photo caption pages
- HABS No. HI-382, "Bachelor Officers' Quarters, Saratoga Boulevard between Hancock Avenue & Yorktown Boulevard", 11 photos, 26 data pages, 2 photo caption pages
- HABS No. HI-383, "Waterfront Transit Shed, Corner of Gaffney Street & Astoria Avenue along Wharf K11", 6 photos, 15 data pages, 2 photo caption pages
- HABS No. HI-385, "Barracks & Mess Hall, Hornet Avenue between Liscome Bay & Enterprise Streets", 7 photos, 24 data pages, 2 photo caption pages
- HABS No. HI-386, "Waipio Peninsula, Waipo Peninsula", 19 photos, 19 data pages, 2 photo caption pages
- HABS No. HI-387, "Recreational Facilities, Various locations throughout base", 1 photo, 17 data pages, 2 photo caption pages
- HABS No. HI-390, "Splinterproof Air Raid Shelters, Various locations throughout base", 1 photo, 26 data pages, 1 photo caption page
- HABS No. HI-391, "Bombproof Facilities, Various locations throughout base", 12 photos, 20 data pages, 2 photo caption pages
- HABS No. HI-392, "Makalapa Support Facilities, Makalapa Administration Area", 1 photo, 13 data pages, 1 photo caption page
- HABS No. HI-393, "Pearl City Peninsula, Pearl City, Honolulu County, HI", 10 photos, 26 data pages, 2 photo caption pages
- HABS No. HI-395, "Bombproof Personnel Shelter, Enterprise Street and St. Lo Avenue", 5 photos, 15 data pages, 2 photo caption pages
- HABS No. HI-396, "Paint & Oil Storehouse, Pokomoke Street and Lexington Boulevard", 7 photos, 19 data pages, 2 photo caption pages
- HABS No. HI-397, "Boat House, Hornet Avenue at Independence Street", 4 photos, 16 data pages, 2 photo caption pages
- HABS No. HI-398, "Inert Ammunition Storehouses, Avocet and Kingfisher Streets", 6 photos, 15 data pages, 2 photo caption pages
- HABS No. HI-399, "United States All-Steel Hangar, Wasp Boulevard between Kingfisher Street and Ranger Loop", 6 photos, 6 data pages, 2 photo caption pages

=== HI-400 through HI-449 ===
- HABS No. HI-400, "Landplane Hangar Type, Wasp Boulevard and Gambier Bay Street", 11 photos, 19 data pages, 3 photo caption pages
- HABS No. HI-401, "Lubricating Oil Storage Building, Merry Point near North Road", 4 photos, 18 data pages, 2 photo caption pages
- HABS No. HI-403, "Gymnasium & Theater, Neville Way", 10 photos, 15 data pages, 3 photo caption pages
- HABS No. HI-404, "Boiler House & Cold Storage, Butchers Shop & Dry Stores Building, South Avenue near Salvor Street", 9 photos, 11 data pages, 2 photo caption pages
- HABS No. HI-405, "Bakery, South Avenue", 4 photos, 10 data pages, 2 photo caption pages
- HABS No. HI-406, "Storehouse for Defense Battalion Type, Between Port Royal Street & Fuller Way", 12 photos, 14 data pages, 2 photo caption pages
- HABS No. HI-407, "Administration Building, Russell Avenue at Port Royal Street", 7 photos, 39 data pages, 2 photo caption pages
- HABS No. HI-408, "Degaussing Range House, Southern tip of Waipio Peninsula", 7 photos, 11 data pages, 2 photo caption pages
- HABS No. HI-409, "Winch Station, Near shore in Iriquois Point Housing Area", 3 photos, 20 data pages, 2 photo caption pages
- HABS No. HI-410, "Gasoline Drumming Plant, Ewa Junction", 3 photos, 13 data pages, 2 photo caption pages
- HABS No. HI-411, "Naval Net Depot Storehouse & Shop, Bishop Point", 4 photos, 20 data pages, 2 photo caption pages
- HABS No. HI-412, "Diesel Purification Plant, North Road near Pierce Street", 3 photos, 17 data pages, 2 photo caption pages
- HABS No. HI-413, "Merry Point Barracks, Between North Road & Quarry Loch", 4 photos, 14 data pages, 2 photo caption pages
- HABS No. HI-414, "Temporary Dry Provisions Storehouses, Merry Point Wharf near North Street", 23 photos, 35 data pages, 4 photo caption pages
- HABS No. HI-415, "Temporary Storehouses - 1941 Type, Between Russell, South and Paul Hamilton Avenues", 7 photos, 17 data pages, 2 photo caption pages
- HABS No. HI-416, "Bloch Recreation Center & Arena, Between Center Drive & North Road near Nimitz Gate", 31 photos, 44 data pages, 5 photo caption pages
- HABS No. HI-417, "First Aid & Decontamination Building, Wasp Boulevard near Ranger Loop", 4 photos, 13 data pages, 2 photo caption pages
- HABS No. HI-418, "Naval Air Base Temporary Storehouse, Avoget Street and Ranger Loop", 14 photos, 19 data pages, 3 photo caption pages
- HABS No. HI-419, "Receiving Barracks, Willamette Street at Spruance Street", 4 photos, 17 data pages, 2 photo caption pages
- HABS No. HI-420, "Marine Corps Officers' Quarters, Russell Avenue, between Central Avenue and Salvor Street", 16 photos, 26 data pages, 4 photo caption pages
- HABS No. HI-421, "Marine Corps Officers' Duplex Quarters, Salvor Street & Russell Avenue", 5 photos, 21 data pages, 2 photo caption pages
- HABS No. HI-422, "Bombproof Communication Center, Hornet Avenue at Liscome Bay Street", 9 photos, 17 data pages, 3 photo caption pages
- HABS No. HI-423, "Type A Casualty Station, Hale Alii Avenue at Frederick Street", 3 photos, 15 data pages, 2 photo caption pages
- HABS No. HI-426, "Combat Intelligence Center, Makalapa Drive in Makalapa Administration Area", 6 photos, 19 data pages, 2 photo caption pages
- HABS No. HI-427, "Joint Intelligence Center, Makalapa Drive in Makalapa Administration Area", 5 photos, 14 data pages, 2 photo caption pages
- HABS No. HI-428, "Commander in Chief Pacific Fleet Garage, Laupele & Ulithe Roads in Makalapa Administration Area", 3 photos, 14 data pages, 2 photo caption pages
- HABS No. HI-429, "Two-Story Storehouses with Ramps, Port Royal Street between Central and South Avenues", 10 photos, 18 data pages, 3 photo caption pages
- HABS No. HI-430, "Temporary Storehouses - 1943 Type, Between Neches and Neosho Avenues, at Utah Street", 7 photos, 14 data pages, 2 photo caption pages
- HABS No. HI-431, "Accounting Building, Kuahua and Hurt Avenues", 18 photos, 28 data pages, 5 photo caption pages
- HABS No. HI-432, "Battery Adair, Princeton Place", 8 photos, 18 data pages, 3 photo caption pages
- HABS No. HI-433, "Six-Story General Storehouse, Gaffney Street at Quincy Avenue", 5 photos, 21 data pages, 2 photo caption pages
- HABS No. HI-434, "Dry Provisions Storehouse, Quincy Avenue at North Road", 5 photos, 19 data pages, 2 photo caption pages
- HABS No. HI-435, "Temporary Storehouses - 1944 Type, North Road at Neches Avenue", 8 photos, 17 data pages, 2 photo caption pages
- HABS No. HI-438, "Post Office, Pearl Harbor Boulevard near Willamette Street", 9 photos, 17 data pages, 2 photo caption pages
- HABS No. HI-440, "Chief Petty Officer's Quarters, 28 Belleau Wood Loop", 8 photos, 19 data pages, 2 photo caption pages
- HABS No. HI-441, "Chief Petty Officer's Quarters, 29 Belleau Wood Loop", 4 photos, 8 data pages, 2 photo caption pages
- HABS No. HI-442, "Chief Petty Officer's Quarters, 31 Belleau Wood Loop", 4 photos, 8 data pages, 2 photo caption pages
- HABS No. HI-443, "Chief Petty Officer's Quarters, 31 Belleau Wood Loop", 4 photos, 8 data pages, 2 photo caption pages
- HABS No. HI-444, "Married Chief Petty Officer's Quarters, 90 Belleau Wood Loop", 7 photos, 8 data pages, 2 photo caption pages
- HABS No. HI-445, "Instrument Shop & Electrical Shop Lean-to, Avenue E, between Sixth & Seventh Streets", 12 photos, 19 data pages, 2 photo caption pages
- HABS No. HI-446, "Power House, Near Seventh Street, between Avenues D & E", 12 photos, 13 data pages, 2 photo caption pages
- HABS No. HI-447, "Boat Shop, Seventh Street near Avenue E", 6 photos, 13 data pages, 1 photo caption page
- HABS No. HI-448, "Latrine No. 1, Near Sixth Street, across from Dry Dock No. 1", 6 photos, 10 data pages, 1 photo caption page
- HABS No. HI-449, "Paint & Oil Storehouse, Avenue D near Seventh Street intersection", 9 photos, 13 data pages, 2 photo caption pages

=== HI-450 through HI-499 ===
- HABS No. HI-450, "Latrine for Machine Shop, Near intersection of Sixth Street & Avenue D, adjacent to Facility No. 67", 6 photos, 9 data pages, 1 photo caption page
- HABS No. HI-451, "Marine Railway No. 1 Accessories House & Apprentice Welding School, Additions, Intersection of Avenue B & Sixth Street", 40 photos, 25 data pages, 6 photo caption pages
- HABS No. HI-452, "Latrines, Off Avenue C, at Repair Basins B13, B15-B18 & B20", 6 photos, 14 data pages, 1 photo caption page
- HABS No. HI-453, "Dry Dock No. 1, Latrine, Sixth Street, adjacent to Dry Dock No. 1", 5 photos, 11 data pages, 1 photo caption page
- HABS No. HI-454, "Operations & Message Center, Behind Facility No. 1, corner of Avenue E & Seventh Street, connected to Facility Nos. 1B & 1D by wooden bridges", 7 photos, 15 data pages, 1 photo caption page
- HABS No. HI-455, "Latrine, End of Avenue A, between Facility No. 68 & Repair Wharf B22", 5 photos, 10 data pages, 1 photo caption page
- HABS No. HI-456, "Galley, Near Avenue G, between Dry Dock Nos. 1 & 2", 4 photos, 10 data pages, 1 photo caption page
- HABS No. HI-457, "Industrial X-Ray Building, Off Sixth Street, adjacent to and south of Facility No. 11", 8 photos, 20 data pages, 1 photo caption page
- HABS No. HI-458, "Hospital Laboratory, Hospital Way, near intersection with Third Street", 5 photos, 14 data pages, 1 photo caption page
- HABS No. HI-459, "Naval Hospital, Animal House, Near intersection of Hospital Way & Third Street", 2 photos, 8 data pages, 1 photo caption page
- HABS No. HI-460, "Prefabricated, Splinterproof Personnel Shelter, Avenue C, near Seventh Street intersection, adjacent to Facility No. 155", 2 photos, 11 data pages, 1 photo caption page
- HABS No. HI-461, "Locomotive Building, Lower Tank Farm, near intersection of Sixth Street & South Avenue", 5 photos, 14 data pages, 1 photo caption page
- HABS No. HI-462, "Steel Storehouse, Intersection of Seventh Street & Avenue E", 7 photos, 11 data pages, 1 photo caption page
- HABS No. HI-463, "Pattern Shop, Seventh Street near Avenue F", 8 photos, 12 data pages, 1 photo caption page
- HABS No. HI-464, "Lumber Storehouse, Seventh Street near Avenue E", 7 photos, 11 data pages, 1 photo caption page
- HABS No. HI-465, "Yard Restaurant, Seventh Street at Avenue D", 7 photos, 16 data pages, 1 photo caption page
- HABS No. HI-466, "Temporary Storehouse & Gas Cylinder Storage, Avenue D, adjacent to east side of Facility No. 29", 10 photos, 11 data pages, 1 photo caption page
- HABS No. HI-467, "One-Story Storehouse, Avenue A near Eighth Street intersection", 14 photos, 12 data pages, 2 photo caption pages
- HABS No. HI-468, "One-Story Storehouse, East side of the two 1936 Repair Basins, Berths B20 & B21, Fronting the intersection of Avenue C & Club Road", 9 photos, 17 data pages, 1 photo caption page
- HABS No. HI-469, "Navy Yard Dispensary, Intersection of Central Avenue & Seventh Street", 13 photos, 21 data pages, 2 photo caption pages
- HABS No. HI-471, "Lubrication Building, Between Avenues D & E, adjacent to Facility Nos. 158 & 159", 6 photos, 9 data pages, 1 photo caption page
- HABS No. HI-472, "Storehouse/Hospital, West end of Second Street opposite Facility No. 371A", 6 photos, 14 data pages, 1 photo caption page
- HABS No. HI-473, "Dry Dock No. 4, Latrine, Intersection of Avenue I & Third Street", 7 photos, 13 data pages, 1 photo caption page
- HABS No. HI-474, "Dry Dock No. 4, Galley, Third Street at intersection of Avenue I", 8 photos, 12 data pages, 1 photo caption page
- HABS No. HI-476, "Administration Annex, Near Russell Avenue (previously Avenue E), between of Facility Nos. 1C & 1E", 12 photos, 27 data pages, 2 photo caption pages
- HABS No. HI-477, "Heavy Ordnance Storehouse & Annex, Avenue D near Eighth Street intersection, adjacent to the west of Parking Lot "A"", 11 photos, 15 data pages, 1 photo caption page
- HABS No. HI-478, "Splinterproof Shelter, Seventh Street between Avenues E & G", 6 photos, 7 data pages, 1 photo caption page
- HABS No. HI-479, "Passenger Shelter, Seventh Street near Avenue F intersection", 4 photos, 6 data pages, 1 photo caption page
- HABS No. HI-480, "Passenger Shelter, Central Avenue near Sixth Street intersection", 3 photos, 5 data pages, 1 photo caption page
- HABS No. HI-481, "Storage Facility, West end of Second Street, Pearl City, Honolulu County, HI", 7 photos, 9 data pages, 1 photo caption page
- HABS No. HI-482, "Latrine Dry Dock No. 2 & Latrine Dry Dock No.3, Near Avenue G adjacent to Dry Dock No. 2 & Dry Dock No. 3", 15 photos, 13 data pages, 2 photo caption pages
- HABS No. HI-484, "Forge Shop & Galvanizing Shop, Sixth Street between Avenues D & E", 15 photos, 18 data pages, 2 photo caption pages
- HABS No. HI-485, "Foundry, Seventh Street near Avenue F intersection", 14 photos, 18 data pages, 2 photo caption pages
- HABS No. HI-486, "Woodworking Shop, Seventh Street near Avenue E", 11 photos, 12 data pages, 2 photo caption pages
- HABS No. HI-487, "General Storehouse, Intersection of Avenue D & Seventh Street", 14 photos, 17 data pages, 2 photo caption pages
- HABS No. HI-488, "Paint Shop & Rigging Loft, Sixth Street between Avenues E & G", 7 photos, 22 data pages, 1 photo caption page
- HABS No. HI-489, "Temporary Decontamination Center, Corner of Avenue D & Seventh Street", 2 photos, 12 data pages, 1 photo caption page
- HABS No. HI-490, "Monterey Storehouse Building No. 66, Avenue D, opposite Facility No. 167 & adjacent to Facility No. 71", 7 photos, 12 data pages, 1 photo caption page
- HABS No. HI-491, "Machine Shop, Sixth Street opposite 10-10 Pier", 20 photos, 16 data pages, 2 photo caption pages
- HABS No. HI-492, "Electric Shop, Sixth Street opposite 10-10 Pier", 13 photos, 15 data pages, 2 photo caption pages
- HABS No. HI-493, "Paint & Oil Storehouse, Avenue D near Seventh Street intersection", 9 photos, 15 data pages, 1 photo caption page
- HABS No. HI-494, "Heavy Materials Storehouse, Second Street near Avenue C intersection", 10 photos, 18 data pages, 1 photo caption page
- HABS No. HI-495, "Sawmill, Seventh Street near Avenue E", 8 photos, 34 data pages, 6 photo caption pages
- HABS No. HI-496, "Shipfitter's Shop, Seventh Street near Avenue C, Adjacent to Repair Basins", 42 photos, 38 data pages, 6 photo caption pages
- HABS No. HI-497, "General Storehouse, Eighth Street at Avenue D", 17 photos, 16 data pages, 2 photo caption pages
- HABS No. HI-498, "Casualty Station Type A, Corner of Avenue G & Sixth Street, near Dry Dock No. 1", 8 photos, 17 data pages, 1 photo caption page
- HABS No. HI-499, "Auxiliary Machine & Electric Shop, Avenue G near Fifth Street intersection", 16 photos, 15 data pages, 2 photo caption pages

=== HI-500 through HI-553 ===
- HABS No. HI-500, "Auxiliary Shipfitters Shop, Avenue G near Fifth Street intersection", 17 photos, 16 data pages, 2 photo caption pages
- HABS No. HI-501, "Marine Railway No. 2 Machine House & Substation, Near intersection of Avenue G & Third Street, northwest of Dry Dock No. 3", 10 photos, 12 data pages, 1 photo caption page
- HABS No. HI-502, "Flask Storage, West side of Seventh Street between Facility Nos. 1107 & S1115", 6 photos, 7 data pages, 1 photo caption page
- HABS No. HI-503, "Ingot & Ore Storehouse, Seventh Street near Central Avenue intersection", 3 photos, 10 data pages, 1 photo caption page
- HABS No. HI-504, "Paint & Oil Storage, Near intersection of Avenue E & Seventh Street, adjacent to Facility Nos. 3A & 56", 5 photos, 5 data pages, 1 photo caption page
- HABS No. HI-505, "Scrap Metal Packaging Facility, Seventh Street between Facility Nos. 6 & 247", 7 photos, 8 data pages, 1 photo caption page
- HABS No. HI-506, "Dry Dock No. 4, East & West Pumpwells, Near south end of Third Street, at east & west sides of Dry Dock No. 4", 8 photos, 8 data pages, 1 photo caption page
- HABS No. HI-509, "Dry Dock No. 2, Pumpwell, East of Dry Dock No. 3", 13 photos, 10 data pages, 2 photo caption pages
- HABS No. HI-510, "Marine Railway No. 2, Crane Wharf, Near intersection of Avenue G & Third Street", 5 photos, 13 data pages, 1 photo caption page
- HABS No. HI-511, "Dry Dock No. 1, Pumpwell, By-Pass Valve & Saltwater Pumphouse, North end of Fifth Street, between Dry Dock No. 1 & Facility GD2", 18 photos, 20 data pages, 2 photo caption pages
- HABS No. HI-512, "Welding Slab, Intersection of Avenue G & Third Street", 3 photos, 7 data pages, 1 photo caption page
- HABS No. HI-513, "Marine Railway No. 2, Near intersection of Avenue G & Third Street", 4 photos, 15 data pages, 1 photo caption page
- HABS No. HI-514, "South Quay Wall & Repair Wharf, L-shaped portion of quay walls starting at east side of mouth of Dry Dock No. 1, continuing along ocean side of Sixth Street, adjacent to Pier B-2", 7 photos, 19 data pages, 1 photo caption page
- HABS No. HI-515, "Dry Dock No. 1, Approach Pier & Caisson Docking Wharf, Ocean end of Fifth Street between Dry Dock Nos. 1 & 2", 6 photos, 21 data pages, 1 photo caption page
- HABS No. HI-516, "Pier & Quay Walls, Entrance to Dry Dock No. 2 & Repair Wharfs, east & west sides of Dry Dock No. 2 & west side of Dry Dock No. 3", 11 photos, 16 data pages, 1 photo caption page
- HABS No. HI-517, "Coal Dock, End of South Avenue near Dry Dock No. 4", 9 photos, 13 data pages, 1 photo caption page
- HABS No. HI-518, "Dry Dock No. 4, East & West Quay Walls, East & west sides of Dry Dock No. 4", 9 photos, 13 data pages, 1 photo caption page
- HABS No. HI-519, "Aviation Storehouse, Vincennes Avenue at Simms Street", 8 photos, 50 data pages, 2 photo caption pages
- HABS No. HI-522-A, "Naval Radio Station, Operations Building, Wahiawa, Honolulu County, HI", 5 photos, 14 data pages, 2 photo caption pages
- HABS No. HI-522-B, "Naval Radio Station, AF/FRD-10 Circularly Disposed Antenna Array, Wahiawa, Honolulu County, HI", 15 photos, 26 data pages, 3 photo caption pages
- HABS No. HI-542, "Naval Ammunition Depot, Magazine for Explosives D, Kuahua Avenue", 20 photos, 28 data pages, 3 photo caption pages
- HABS No. HI-543, "Chief Petty Officer's Quarters, Cowpens Street between Lexington Boulevard and Franklin Avenue", 7 photos, 27 data pages, 2 photo caption pages
- HABS No. HI-551, "Laundry Boiler House, Reuben James Street and Kanaloa Avenue", 16 photos, 20 data pages, 3 photo caption pages
- HABS No. HI-552, "Naval Supply Depot Cafeteria & Boiler House, North Road and Vincenness Street", 21 photos, 22 data pages, 3 photo caption pages
- HABS No. HI-553, "Enlisted Men's Barracks, Marshall Road", 20 photos, 19 data pages, 3 photo caption pages

== See also ==
- Attack on Pearl Harbor
- Lists of buildings and structures in Hawaii
