= Interstate H-201 =

Interstate Highway on Oʻahu, Hawaii, US

Interstate H-201
- Moanalua Freeway
- H-201 highlighted in red

Route information
- Auxiliary route of H-1
- Maintained by HDOT
- Length: 4.1 mi (6.6 km)
- Existed: 1989–present
- History: Signed in 2004
- NHS: Entire route

Major junctions
- West end: Route 99 in ʻAiea
- H-1 in ʻAiea; H-3 in Halawa
- East end: H-1 in Honolulu

Location
- Country: United States
- State: Hawaii
- Counties: Honolulu

Highway system
- Interstate Highway System; Main; Auxiliary; Suffixed; Business; Future; Routes in Hawaii
← Route 200	→ Route 220
← Route 76	Route 78	→ Route 80

Interstate H-201 (H-201, named the Moanalua Freeway) is the only auxiliary Interstate Highway located outside the contiguous United States, serving the island of Oʻahu in the US state of Hawaii. The 4.1-mile-long (6.6 km) loop route connects exits 13 and 19 on H-1, passing Fort Shafter, Tripler Army Medical Center, and the Red Hill Underground Fuel Storage Facility.

Despite being designated an Interstate in 1989, until mid-2004 the route was an unsigned Interstate, signed only as Route 78. The section of the Moanalua Freeway between Route 99 (Kamehameha Highway) and the western H-1 interchange remains designated as Route 78.

== Route description ==
H-201 serves as an alternate route to H-1 near Downtown Honolulu, traveling on the Moanalua Freeway around the northeast side of Salt Lake. It begins at a junction with Route 99 on the north side of Aloha Stadium, located near Joint Base Pearl Harbor–Hickam. The freeway travels east through an interchange with H-1, which continues west toward Kapolei and south to Daniel K. Inouye International Airport, and H-3. H-201 and H-3 briefly run parallel to each other through Halawa, where the former intersects Kahuapaani Street, before H-3 splits to continue northeast across the Koʻolau Range. H-201 turns southeast to avoid Red Hill and travels through Moanalua, a residential neighborhood with hospitals operated by Kaiser Permanente, the US Department of Veterans Affairs, and the US Army (including Tripler Army Medical Center). The freeway continues southeast, passing Moanalua Gardens and an industrial area, before it bisects Fort Shafter, a military installation in the Kalihi valley. H-201 then terminates on the south side of Fort Shafter at an interchange with H-1, which continues southeast towards Downtown Honolulu on the Lunalilo Freeway.

The freeway is maintained by the Hawaii Department of Transportation (HDOT) and is designated as part of the National Highway System, a network of strategic highways in the US. H-201 is generally six to eight lanes wide with an eastbound high-occupancy vehicle (HOV) lane during the morning rush hour from Halawa to Puuloa Road. Traffic volumes on the highway, measured in terms of annual average daily traffic, ranged in 2020 from a minimum of 19,800 vehicles at its western terminus to a maximum of 136,100 vehicles near H-3.

== History ==
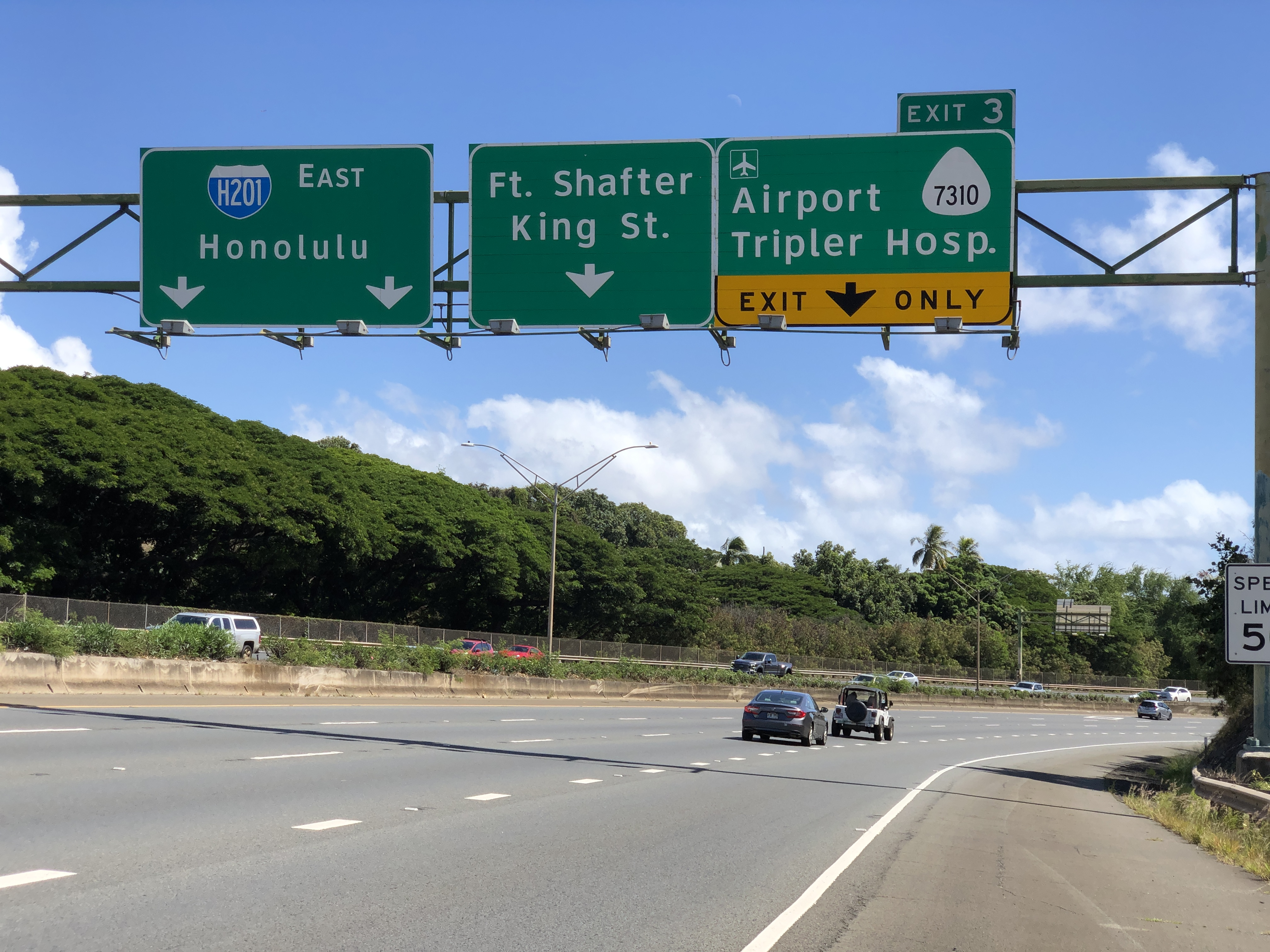
H-201 eastbound approaching exit 3 in Moanalua. Letters in H-201 shields require thinner text, such as on signage like this one.

Moanalua Road, the direct predecessor to H-201, was an unpaved road constructed in the late 19th century to connect Honolulu's King Street to Aiea. The road was macadamized in 1899 but remained in poor condition for several years, prompting calls to prioritize its improvement for tourists. It was repaired in the 1910s, following the establishment of Fort Shafter, and plans were announced to straighten sections of the road in 1921.

The territorial government began preliminary construction of a four-lane divided highway to replace Moanalua Road in 1948, following the opening of the new Tripler Army Hospital. The project, which would reduce the number of curves on the road from 24 to 6, was also meant to connect with the Mauka Arterial (now part of H-1) and relieve congestion on the Kamehameha Highway near Pearl Harbor. The westernmost 2.7 miles (4.3 km) of the divided highway was dedicated and opened to traffic on April 28, 1954. The road was designated as part of Route 72 in 1955.

The remaining section of the original Moanalua Road, bisecting Fort Shafter, was upgraded to a divided highway in the second phase and end at an interchange with the Lunalilo Freeway (also part of H-1). With funding from the territorial highway department and approval of the US Army, several facilities at Fort Shafter were relocated to new buildings in 1958 and the former Tripler Army Hospital was demolished in May 1959 to make way for the project. Construction began in June 1959 under a $1.46-million (equivalent to $12 million in 2024) contract awarded to Hawaiian Dredging and Construction. The widened Fort Shafter section of the Moanalua Highway was opened in September 1960, featuring an interchange at E Street and several overpasses.

Plans to upgrade the western terminus at Aiea to an interchange with the Kamehameha Highway were approved in the late 1950s. Construction began in 1960, and the Aiea interchange opened in stages between June 1965 and November 1965, at a cost of $2 million (equivalent to $15.1 million in 2024). A western extension of the Moanalua Highway from the Aiea interchange with flyover ramps to connect to the Kamehameha Highway was approved for construction in 1964 and was opened to traffic in June 1966. The interchange with the Lunalilo Freeway at the eastern end of the highway was completed in May 1964.

The conversion of the highway to a full freeway began in September 1971 with work near Red Hill and was completed in August 1974. It was estimated to cost $37 million (equivalent to $183 million in 2024) total to construct. An eastbound lane between Halawa and Puuloa Road was designated for carpools of four or more people in October 1974. The highway was designated as Route 78 in the early 1970s.

Hawaii Route 78
- Location: Honolulu
- Length: 0.739 mi (1,189 m)
- Existed: 1989–present

The Federal Highway Administration approved the addition of H-201 to the Interstate Highway System on November 1, 1989. HDOT requested that the Moanalua Freeway be reclassified as an Interstate so that the interchange with H-1 at the eastern end could conform to federal highway standards. HDOT originally asked the American Association of State Highway and Transportation Officials (AASHTO) in June 1990 to approve the freeway as H-1A in an application to AASHTO's Special Committee on US Route Numbering, the committee which approves Interstate Highway designations. HDOT resubmitted a request later that year to number it as H-101, and AASHTO approved it as H-201 on December 8, 1990. The highway was initially designated H-1A, but AASHTO policy does not generally allow alphabetic suffixes in Interstate numbers. The final designation, H-201, conforms to the general rule for three-digit Interstate loop routes that uses an even initial digit.

Until 2004, HDOT chose not to sign H-201 as such, instead retaining the designation Route 78. Reasons given included the following:

- inability to render the new route number in a legible manner (because it has four characters, longer than the one to three characters of any other Interstate, it is necessary to use the thinnest font to render the number, and the shield is wider than the standard Interstate shield)
- encouraging motorists to use the newer and better designed H-1
- avoiding confusion with H-2

In July 2004, in conjunction with a major resurfacing of both sides of the freeway, it was decided to bring the signage in line with the official designation.

== Exit list ==
The entire route is in Honolulu County.

Location	mi	km	Exit	Destinations	Notes
Aiea	0.0	0.0	—	Route 99 west – Pearlridge, Pearl City	Continues as Route 99
Aiea			–	Stadium, Aiea	Westbound exit and eastbound entrance; access via Moanalua Road
Aiea	0.5	0.80	1A	H-1 east – Honolulu International Airport, Pearl Harbor	No westbound exit
Aiea			1C	H-1 west to H-2 north – Pearl City	Westbound signage; no eastbound exit
Halawa	0.9	1.4	1B	Stadium, Halawa, Camp Smith	No westbound entrance; signed as exit 1E westbound; access via Kahuapaani Street
Halawa	1.4	2.3	1C	H-3 east – Kaneohe	Eastbound signage; no westbound entrance; signed as exit 1D westbound; exit 1B on H-3
Honolulu	2.4	3.9	2	Moanalua Valley, Salt Lake, Red Hill	Access via Ala Kapuna and Ala Napunani Streets
Honolulu	3.7	6.0	3	Puuloa Road (Route 7310) – Tripler Hospital, Moanalua Gardens, Airport	
Honolulu	4.5	7.2	4	Fort Shafter, Ahua Street	No number designation on eastbound exit
Honolulu			4	King Street	Eastbound exit and westbound entrance
Honolulu	4.6	7.4	—	H-1 east – Honolulu	Exit 19B on Interstate H-1
1.000 mi = 1.609 km; 1.000 km = 0.621 mi: Incomplete access
