= Hawaii Route 93 =

State highway on Oʻahu, Hawaii, US

Hawaii Route 93
- Farrington Highway
- Route 93 highlighted in red

Route information
- Maintained by HDOT
- Length: 19.524 mi (31.421 km)

Major junctions
- West end: End of road in Kaʻena Point State Park
- East end: H-1 in Kapolei

Location
- Country: United States
- State: Hawaii

Highway system
- Routes in Hawaii
← Route 92	→ Route 95

Route 93 is a major east–west highway on the island of Oahu which begins as Interstate H-1 (H-1) terminates in Kapolei and ends at Kaena Point on the extreme northwest end of Oahu, just past Makaha. It is part of the Farrington Highway.

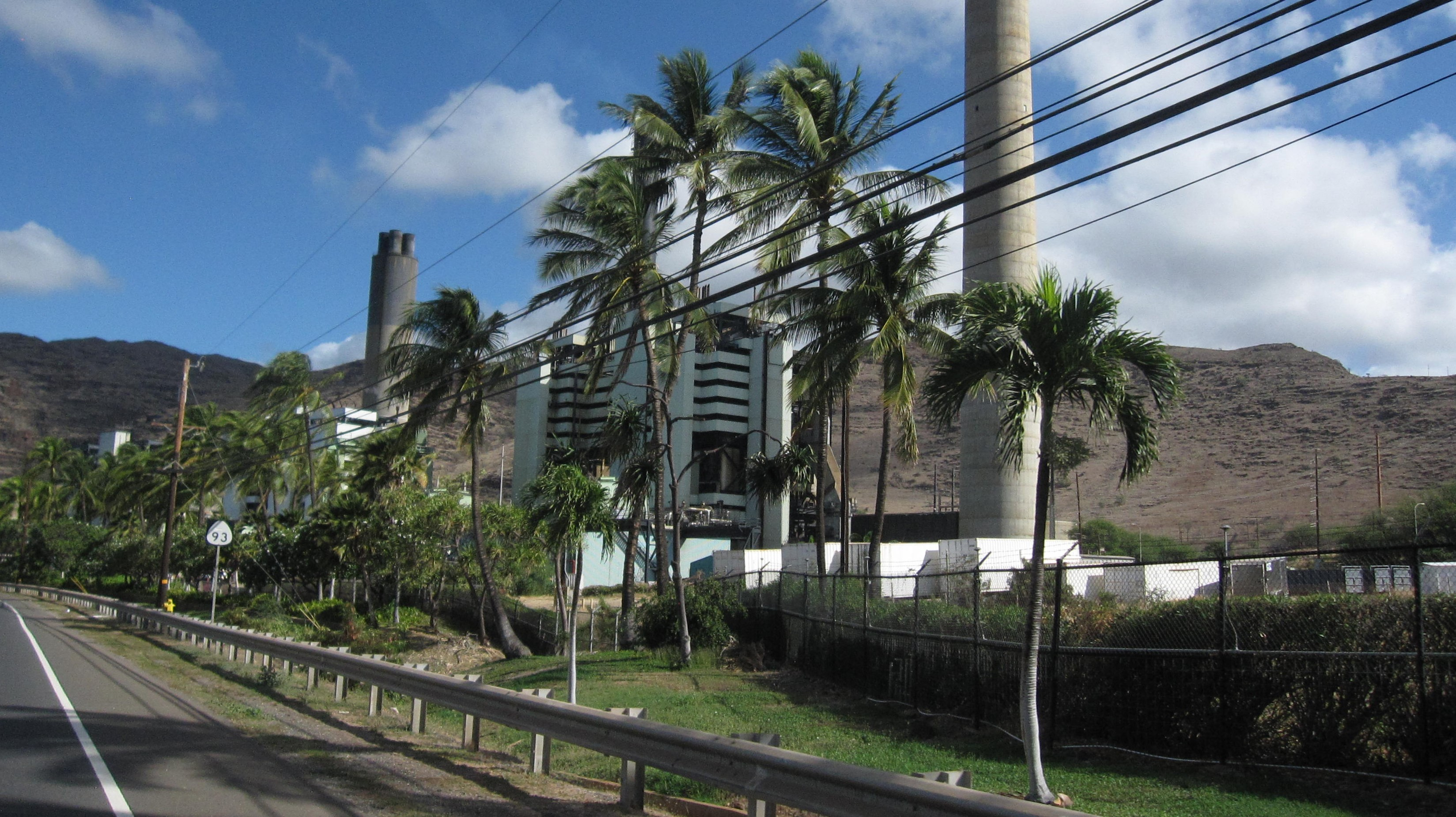
The Kahe Power Plant on Route 93

== Route description ==
As H-1 ends near Kapolei and Ko Olina, it continues as a four lane, and then two lane highway up into the Waianae and Makaha area, the "Leeward Coast", of west Oahu.

== History ==
In the 1960s, the state government studied the feasibility of a highway around Kaena Point, which would be 6.7 miles (10.8 km) long. A rough road around the point, following a disused railroad, had already existed but was not suitable for most vehicle traffic.

== Major intersections ==
The entire route is in Oahu County.

Location	mi	km	Destinations	Notes
Kaʻena Point State Park	0.000	0.000	End of road	Western terminus
Kapolei	19.524	31.421	H-1 east – Honolulu	Eastern terminus; road becomes H-1
1.000 mi = 1.609 km; 1.000 km = 0.621 mi
