= Hawaii Route 76 =

State highway in Honolulu County, Hawaii, United States

Hawaii Route 76
- Fort Weaver Road

Route information
- Maintained by HDOT
- Length: 6.0 mi (9.7 km)

Major junctions
- South end: Ewa Beach Park in ʻEwa Beach
- North end: H-1 at Waipahu

Location
- Country: United States
- State: Hawaii
- Counties: Honolulu

Highway system
- Routes in Hawaii
← Route 72	→ Route 78

Route 76 or Fort Weaver Road is a major north–south highway on the island of Oʻahu which begins at Interstate H-1 (H-1) in Waipahu and ends in ʻEwa Beach.

== Route description ==
Route 76 is the main thoroughfare from the Ewa Beach community to H-1. Along the route is an intersection with Farrington Highway, Hawaii Medical Center West, West Loch Golf Course, Ewa Gentry, Laulani Park and Holomua Elementary School.

== History ==
Fort Weaver Road is 6.0 miles (9.7 km) long and runs through Ewa Beach. Fort Weaver Road was completed in June 1982.

== Major intersections ==
The entire route is in Honolulu County.

Location	mi	km	Exit	Destinations	Notes
ʻEwa Beach	0.0	0.0		Fort Weaver Road	Southern terminus of Route 76
				Geiger Road, Iroquois Road (Route 764)	
			South end of freeway		
			5	Route 7110 west – Kapolei	
			6A	Route 7101 east – Waipahu	Signed as exit 5 northbound
Waipahu			North end of freeway		
Waipahu	6.0	9.7		H-1 – Honolulu, Makakilo, Kapolei, Waianae	Interchange; northern terminus of Route 76; H-1 east exit 5, west exits 5A-B
Waipahu	6.0	9.7		Route 750 north – Kunia	Continuation beyond northern terminus
1.000 mi = 1.609 km; 1.000 km = 0.621 mi
