= Interstate 4 (disambiguation) =

Interstate 4 may refer to any of three unconnected Interstate Highways in the United States:

- Interstate 4 in Florida
- Interstate A-4 in Alaska
- Interstate H-4, a proposed highway in Hawaii
