= Hawaii Route 8930 =

State highway in Kapolei, Hawaii, United States

Hawaii Route 8930
- Kualakaʻi Parkway

Route information
- Maintained by HDOT
- Length: 2.5 mi (4.0 km)
- Existed: 2010–present

Major junctions
- South end: Kapolei Parkway in Kapolei
- Route 7110 in Kapolei
- North end: H-1 in Kapolei

Location
- Country: United States
- State: Hawaii
- Counties: Honolulu

Highway system
- Routes in Hawaii
← Route 8925	→ Route 8940

Hawaii Route 8930, known as the Kualakaʻi Parkway and previously as the North–South Road, broke ground in 2005 and was completed in 2010. The 2.5-mile-long (4.0 km) highway connects the H-1 freeway in the north end to Kapolei Parkway in the south end in Kapolei.

== History ==
The Hawaii Department of Transportation, during the Lingle Administration, broke ground on the 2.5-mile-long (4.0 km), six-lane highway on February 9, 2005. The highway was completed in three phases. The first phase included the completion of a new overpass to accommodate the new four-lane highway to pass under the H-1 freeway. The second phase built the four-lane highway from Kapolei Parkway up to the junction with Route 7110 and cost more than $12 million. The third and final phase connected the second phase with the H-1 freeway. The highway was completed and dedicated on February 11, 2010, and named Kualakai Parkway. The name Kualakai traditionally means "to unite people in new lands".

== Major intersections ==
The entire route is in Kapolei, Honolulu County.

mi	km	Destinations	Notes
0.0	0.0	H-1	Exit 3 on H-1
0.5	0.80	Route 7110	
2.5	4.0	Kapolei Parkway	
1.000 mi = 1.609 km; 1.000 km = 0.621 mi
