= Waipiʻo, Hawaii =

Census-designated place in Hawaii, United States

Waipiʻo
- Census-designated place
- Location in Honolulu County and the state of Hawaii
- Coordinates: 21°25′5″N 157°59′53″W
- Country: United States
- State: Hawaii

Area
  - Total: 1.25 sq mi (3.23 km^{2})
  - Land: 1.25 sq mi (3.23 km^{2})
  - Water: 0 sq mi (0.00 km^{2})
- Elevation: 381 ft (116 m)

Population (2020)
  - Total: 12,082
  - Density: 9,691.9/sq mi (3,742.05/km^{2})
- Time zone: UTC−10 (Hawaii-Aleutian)
- ZIP Code: 96797
- Area code: 808
- FIPS code: 15-79860
- GNIS feature ID: 1867265

Waipiʻo (Hawaiian pronunciation: [vɐjˈpiʔo]) is a census-designated place (CDP) located on the island of Oʻahu in the City & County of Honolulu, Hawaii, United States. In Hawaiian, wai piʻo means "curved water". As of the 2020 census, the CDP had a population of 12,082.

The U.S. ZIP Code for Waipiʻo is 96797.

== History ==
In ancient Hawaii, the Battle of Kīpapa Gulch was said to have taken place at Kīpapa Gulch in Waipiʻo. Maʻilikākahi was the mōʻī of Oʻahu at the time. The battle began at Waikakalaua Gulch in the adjacent ahupuaʻa of Waikele. It eventually made its way into Kīpapa Gulch. The raiding party was defeated, and it is said that the gulch was "paved with the corpses of the slain."

== Geography ==
Waipiʻo is located at 21°25′5″N 157°59′53″W (21.418050, -157.997988), south of Mililani Town via either Interstate H-2 or Kamehameha Highway (Hawaii Route 99). The town is immediately east of Waikele, separated by Kamehameha Highway, the road that leads southward to Farrington Highway (Hawaii Route 90) with connections then to Pearl City to the east and Waipahu to the west. In this same area south of Waipiʻo is the interchange between Hawaii Interstates H-1 and H-2 at Waiawa. Neighborhoods include Crestview.

According to the United States Census Bureau, the CDP has a total area of 1.2 square miles (3.1 km^{2}), all of it land.

== Demographics ==
Historical population
Census	Pop.	Note	%±
1990	11,812		—
2000	11,672		−1.2%
2010	11,674		0.0%
2020	12,082		3.5%

As of the census of 2000, there were 11,672 people, 3,974 households, and 2,873 families residing in the CDP. The population density was 9,700.5 inhabitants per square mile (3,745.4/km^{2}). There were 4,110 housing units at an average density of 3,415.8 per square mile (1,318.8/km^{2}). The racial makeup of the CDP was 14.42% White, 2.82% African American, 0.18% Native American, 54.66% Asian, 5.45% Pacific Islander, 0.86% from other races, and 21.62% from two or more races. Hispanic or Latino of any race were 6.76% of the population.

There were 3,974 households, out of which 38.6% had children under the age of 18 living with them, 57.1% were married couples living together, 10.5% had a female householder with no husband present, and 27.7% were non-families. 20.9% of all households were made up of individuals, and 2.2% had someone living alone who was 65 years of age or older. The average household size was 2.92 and the average family size was 3.41.

In the CDP the population was spread out, with 26.2% under the age of 18, 9.3% from 18 to 24, 34.6% from 25 to 44, 23.4% from 45 to 64, and 6.5% who were 65 years of age or older. The median age was 34 years. For every 100 females there were 101.1 males. For every 100 females age 18 and over, there were 100.0 males.

The median income for a household in the CDP was $61,276, and the median income for a family was $69,282. Males had a median income of $41,943 versus $31,840 for females. The per capita income for the CDP was $24,451. About 3.3% of families and 4.1% of the population were below the poverty line, including 5.1% of those under the age of 18 and 7.0% of those 65 and older.

== Climate ==
Waipiʻo has a tropical savanna climate (Köppen: Aw).

Climate data for Waipiʻo
Month	Jan	Feb	Mar	Apr	May	Jun	Jul	Aug	Sep	Oct	Nov	Dec	Year
Mean daily maximum °C (°F)	24.8 (76.6)	24.5 (76.1)	24.8 (76.6)	25.6 (78.1)	26.8 (80.2)	27.7 (81.9)	28.2 (82.8)	28.6 (83.5)	28.7 (83.7)	28.0 (82.4)	26.5 (79.7)	25.3 (77.5)	26.6 (79.9)
Daily mean °C (°F)	22.0 (71.6)	21.7 (71.1)	22.0 (71.6)	22.8 (73.0)	23.8 (74.8)	24.7 (76.5)	25.3 (77.5)	25.6 (78.1)	25.6 (78.1)	25.0 (77.0)	23.8 (74.8)	22.7 (72.9)	23.8 (74.7)
Mean daily minimum °C (°F)	19.8 (67.6)	19.6 (67.3)	20.0 (68.0)	20.7 (69.3)	21.5 (70.7)	22.5 (72.5)	23.1 (73.6)	23.5 (74.3)	23.4 (74.1)	22.9 (73.2)	21.9 (71.4)	20.8 (69.4)	21.6 (71.0)
Average precipitation mm (inches)	32.5 (1.28)	34.0 (1.34)	47.3 (1.86)	25.5 (1.00)	23.5 (0.93)	20.6 (0.81)	19.3 (0.76)	20.9 (0.82)	18.1 (0.71)	29.1 (1.15)	37.7 (1.48)	44.1 (1.74)	352.6 (13.88)
Source: Weather.Directory

== Government and infrastructure ==
The Hawaii Department of Public Safety operates the Waiawa Correctional Facility, a minimum security prison near Waipiʻo.

In 2017, the state approved NRG Energy, Inc., to build a 45.9 megawatt solar farm project north of Costco near Waiawa and H-2 in Waipiʻo. Hawaiian Electric Companies (HECO) will buy electricity from this solar farm at 10.4 cents per kilowatt-hour (kWh) for 22 years. On September 10, 2019, the 45.9 megawatt Waipiʻo Solar developed by Clearway Energy Group began its operation. Originally started by the developer SunEdison, Hawaiian Electric broke its ties to the firm in February 2016 before SunEdison's bankruptcy proceedings. San Francisco-based Clearway's predecessor the NRG Energy's Community Solar division, took over the project at the end of November 2016. On January 22, 2019, the Clearway Energy Group obtained NRG Community Solar's assets.

In March 2019, the Public Utilities Commission approved Clearway Energy Group to build a 36 megawatt with 144 megawatt-hour storage solar farm plus battery storage project near Waipiʻo called Waiawa Solar. HECO will buy electricity from this solar-plus-storage project at 10 cents per kilowatt-hour (kWh). The Waiawa Solar project is expected to be completed by Clearway and go online at the end of 2021.

== Education ==
Hawaii Department of Education operates public schools. Kanoelani Elementary School is in the Waipiʻo CDP.

== Recreation ==
=== Little League World Series ===
In 2008, the team from Waipiʻo LL, representing Hawaii and the United States, captured the Little League World Series crown, beating Matamoros LL, Mexico 12–3 in 6 innings. ʻIolana Akau started with a solo blast earlier in the game and Tanner Tokunaga added two homers later in the game. Waipiʻo is the second team from the ʻEwa District to win the world championship; ʻEwa Beach representing West Oʻahu won the title in 2005.

In 2010, the Waipiʻo LL team won the U.S. championship of the Little League World Series, defeating Pearland White LL from Pearland, Texas on August 28, 2010, by a score of 10-0 after 5 innings, which invoked the Little League "mercy rule" where a team is leading by 10 runs or more after 4 innings. They lost in a close 4–1 game to Edogawa Minami LL of Tokyo, Japan on August 29, 2010, in the Series final.

== See also ==
- Central Oahu Regional Park
