= Hawaii Route 72 =

State highway in Honolulu County, Hawaii, United States

Hawaii Route 72
- Kalanianaʻole Highway
- Route 72 highlighted in red

Route information
- Maintained by HDOT
- Length: 18.5 mi (29.8 km)

Major junctions
- From: H-1 in East Honolulu
- To: Route 61 in Maunawili

Location
- Country: United States
- State: Hawaii

Highway system
- Routes in Hawaii
← Route 65	→ Route 76

Route 72, commonly known as Kalanianaʻole Highway, is the main highway serving southeast Oʻahu. Beginning at the eastern terminus of Interstate H-1 (H-1), the east–west highway travels along the southeastern shore of Oʻahu through various residential neighborhoods, including Hawaiʻi Kai. It turns northwest at Makapuʻu and runs through Waimānalo before terminating in Maunawili at an intersection with Kamehameha Highway and Pali Highway. The highway is named for Jonah Kūhiō Kalanianaʻole, a former prince of the Kingdom of Hawaiʻi.

== Route description ==
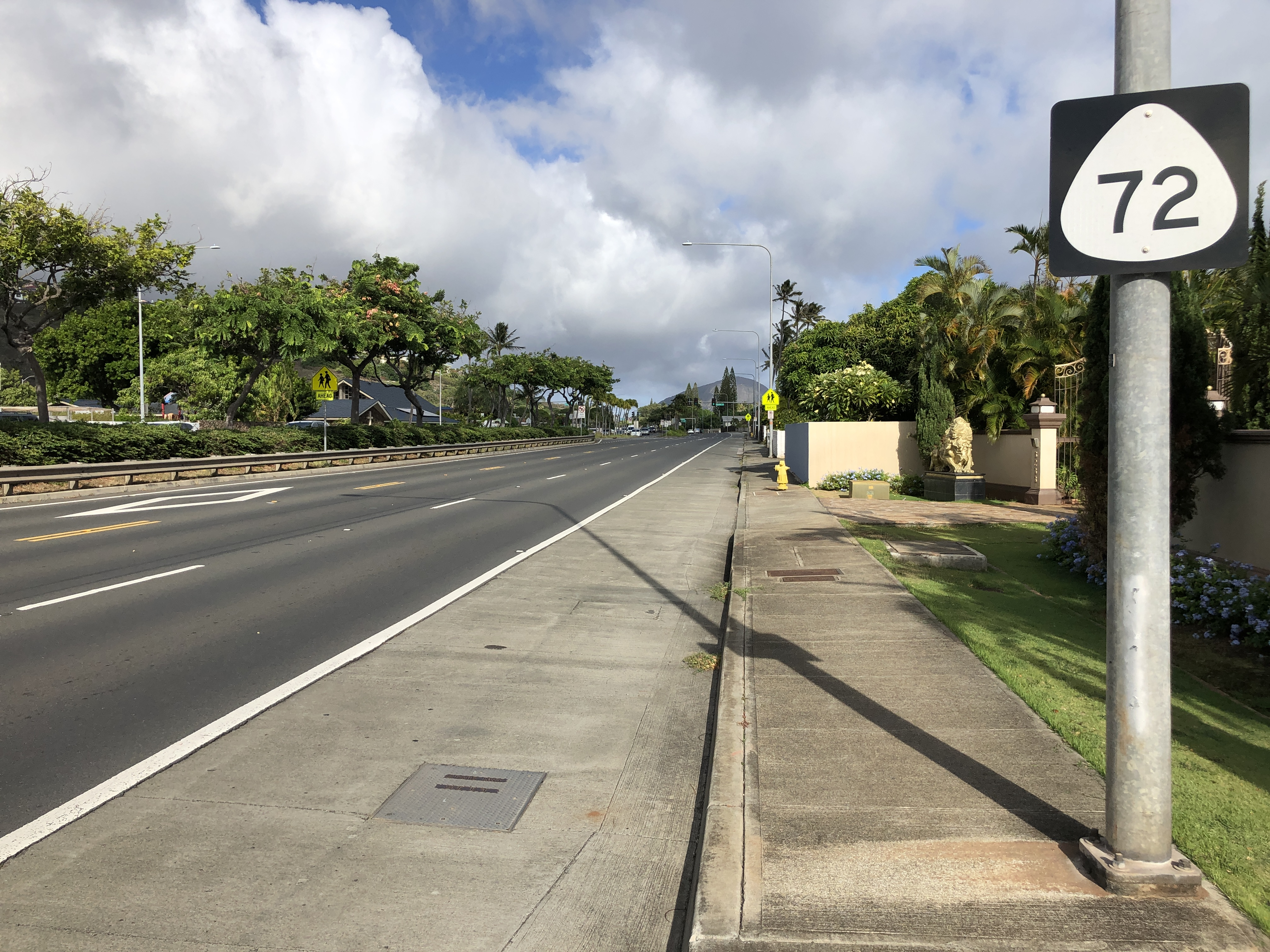
Route 72 eastbound in ʻĀina Haina

Route 72 begins as an extension of Interstate H-1 (the Lunalilo Freeway), near the Kahala Mall in eastern Honolulu. The six-lane road travels east through a residential neighborhood along the north side of the Waialae Country Club towards the Pacific Coast. At Wailupe Beach, it turns northeast and continues along the coast through ʻĀina Haina, crossing several streams and suburban lagoons.

The highway turns southeast near Hawaiʻi Kai, crossing the inland waters of the Kui Channel and climbing part of Koko Crater.

The highway was named for Jonah Kūhiō Kalanianaʻole, a Hawaiian prince and later Congressman who attempted to restore Queen Liliʻuokalani to the throne after the 1893 overthrow by American residents.

== Major intersections ==
The entire route is in Honolulu County.

Location	mi	km	Destinations	Notes
East Honolulu	0.00	0.00	H-1 west / Ainakoa Avenue north / Waikui Street east	CW terminus; highway continues west as H-1
Maunawili	18.5	29.8	Route 61 – Kailua, Kaneohe MCBH, Kaneohe, Honolulu	CCW terminus; road continues west as Ulukahiki Street
1.000 mi = 1.609 km; 1.000 km = 0.621 mi

== See also ==
- List of Hawaii state highways
