= Makakilo, Hawaii =

Census-designated place in Hawaii, United States

Makakilo
- Census-designated place
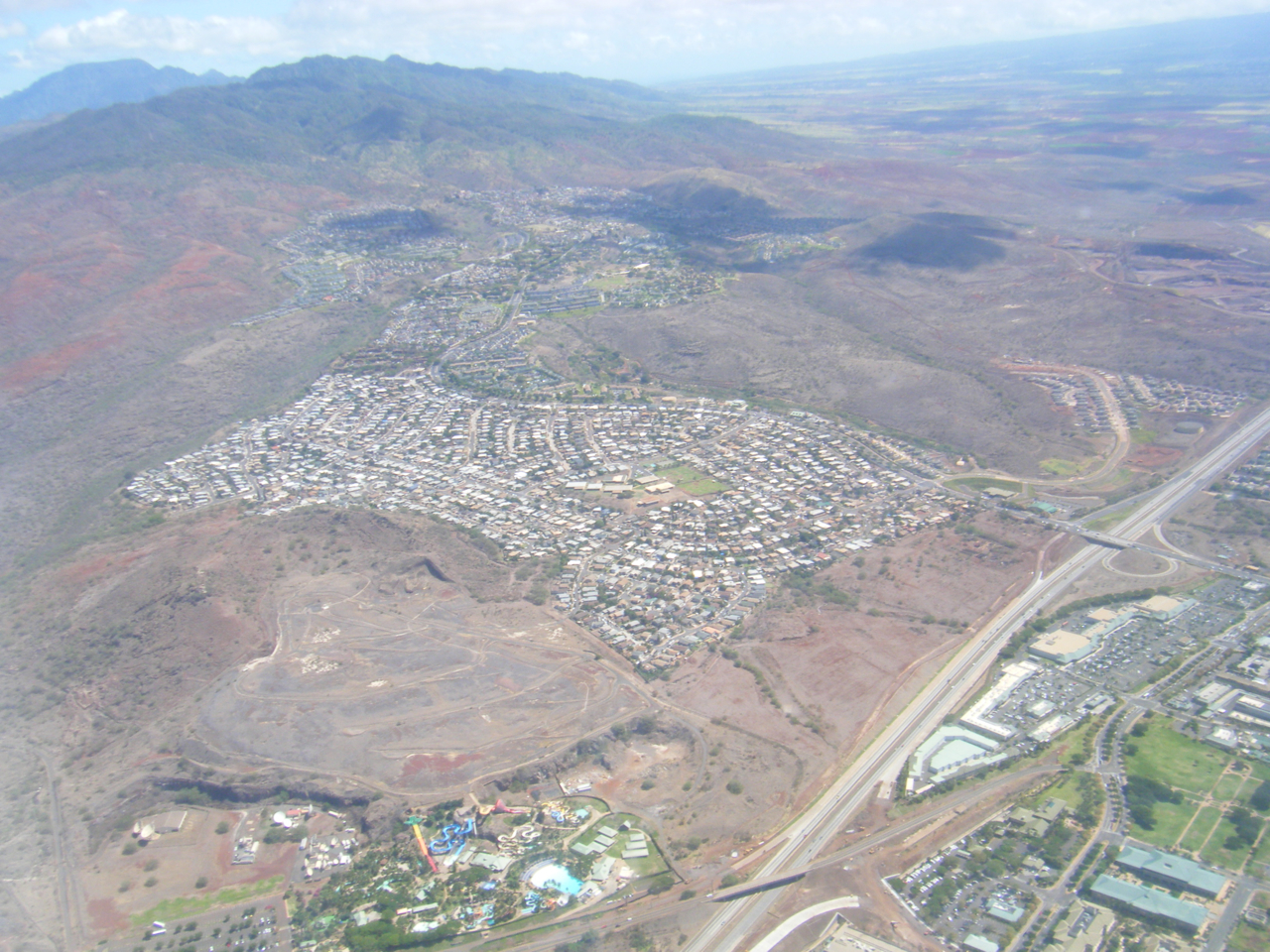
- Makakilo Aerial

- Location in Honolulu County and the state of Hawaii
- Coordinates: 21°21′10″N 158°5′27″W
- Country: United States
- State: Hawaii
- Counties: Honolulu

Area
  - Total: 3.82 sq mi (9.90 km^{2})
  - Land: 3.82 sq mi (9.90 km^{2})
  - Water: 0 sq mi (0.00 km^{2})
- Elevation: 600 ft (180 m)

Population (2020)
  - Total: 19,877
  - Density: 5,202.6/sq mi (2,008.73/km^{2})
- ZIP code: 96707
- Area code: 808
- FIPS code: 15-47600

Makakilo (Hawaiian pronunciation: [məkəˈtilo]) or Makakilo City is a census-designated place and residential area located in the ʻEwa District on the island of Oʻahu in the City & County of Honolulu, United States. In Hawaiian, maka kilo means "observing eyes". As of the 2020 census, the CDP had a population of 19,877.

== Geography ==
Makakilo is located at 21°21′10″N 158°5′27″W (21.352850, -158.090732) on the southern end of the slopes of the Waiʻanae mountain range above the city of Kapolei. The Interstate H-1 freeway divides more recently developed Kapolei from Makakilo, and traveling eastward on H-1 connects to Waipahu. The freeway ends about 1.5 miles (2.4 km) west of Makakilo, merging into Farrington Highway (State Rte. 90) to Kahe Point and then Nānākuli on the Waiʻanae Coast. Exit 1 on H-1 is Kalaeloa Road, the entrance to Barbers Point and Campbell Industrial Park.

According to the United States Census Bureau, the CDP has a total area of 3.1 square miles (8.0 km^{2}), all land.

== Demographics ==
Historical population
Census	Pop.	Note	%±
2020	19,877		—
U.S. Decennial Census

=== 2020 census ===
As of the 2020 census, Makakilo had a population of 19,877. The median age was 37.3 years. 23.9% of residents were under the age of 18 and 13.5% of residents were 65 years of age or older. For every 100 females there were 97.9 males, and for every 100 females age 18 and over there were 97.1 males age 18 and over.

99.5% of residents lived in urban areas, while 0.5% lived in rural areas.

There were 6,021 households in Makakilo, of which 40.0% had children under the age of 18 living in them. Of all households, 62.6% were married-couple households, 13.1% were households with a male householder and no spouse or partner present, and 17.5% were households with a female householder and no spouse or partner present. About 11.8% of all households were made up of individuals and 4.2% had someone living alone who was 65 years of age or older.

There were 6,283 housing units, of which 4.2% were vacant. The homeowner vacancy rate was 1.4% and the rental vacancy rate was 5.1%.

Racial composition as of the 2020 census
Race	Number	Percent
White	3,815	19.2%
Black or African American	540	2.7%
American Indian and Alaska Native	88	0.4%
Asian	6,447	32.4%
Native Hawaiian and Other Pacific Islander	1,868	9.4%
Some other race	455	2.3%
Two or more races	6,664	33.5%
Hispanic or Latino (of any race)	2,816	14.2%

=== 2000 census ===
As of the census of 2000, there were 13,156 people, 3,898 households, and 3,223 families in the CDP. The population density was 4,188.0 inhabitants per square mile (1,617.0/km^{2}). There were 4,119 housing units at an average density of 1,311.2 per square mile (506.3/km^{2}). The racial makeup of the CDP was 24.16% White, 2.53% Black or African American, 0.20% Native American, 32.08% Asian, 10.20% Pacific Islander, 1.51% from other races, and 29.32% from two or more races. 10.09% of the population were Hispanic or Latino of any race.

Of the 3,898 households 44.2% had children under the age of 18 living with them, 65.9% were married couples living together, 11.3% had a female householder with no husband present, and 17.3% were non-families. 11.3% of households were one person and 1.4% were one person aged 65 or older. The average household size was 3.37 and the average family size was 3.64.

The age distribution was 30.5% under the age of 18, 8.4% from 18 to 24, 33.6% from 25 to 44, 21.5% from 45 to 64, and 6.1% 65 or older. The median age was 32 years. For every 100 females, there were 101.0 males. For every 100 females age 18 and over, there were 98.5 males.

The median household income was $66,515 and the median family income was $67,267. Males had a median income of $40,067 versus $31,194 for females. The per capita income for the CDP was $20,945. 5.1% of the population and 4.3% of families were below the poverty line. Out of the total population, 7.1% of those under the age of 18 and 3.6% of those 65 and older were living below the poverty line.

== Education ==
Hawaii Department of Education operates two public elementary schools in the CDP: Makakilo Elementary School and Mauka Lani Elementary School.

== Recreation ==
Wet'n'Wild Hawaii was defined in the Makakilo City CDP in the 2000 U.S. census but for the 2010 U.S. census was redefined as being in Kapolei CDP.
