= Interstate H-2 =

Interstate Highway in Hawaii, US

Interstate H-2
- Veterans Memorial Freeway
- H-2 highlighted in red

Route information
- Maintained by HDOT
- Length: 8.33 mi (13.41 km)
- Existed: August 29, 1960–present
- History: Completed in 1977
- NHS: Entire route

Major junctions
- South end: H-1 in Waipahu
- North end: Route 99 in Wahiawā

Location
- Country: United States
- State: Hawaii
- Counties: Honolulu

Highway system
- Interstate Highway System; Main; Auxiliary; Suffixed; Business; Future; Routes in Hawaii
← H-1	→ H-3

Interstate H-2 (H-2), named the Veterans Memorial Freeway, is an intrastate Interstate Highway located on the island of Oʻahu in the U.S. state of Hawaii. The north–south freeway connects H-1 in Pearl City to Mililani and Wahiawa, where it terminates at Route 99 near Schofield Barracks.

The Interstate System was expanded to Hawaii in 1960 along several corridors, with H-2 assigned to the north–south connection between the Honolulu area and Wahiawa. Construction began in 1971, and the first section opened to traffic on October 3, 1974. The rest of H-2 was completed on February 21, 1977.

== Route description ==
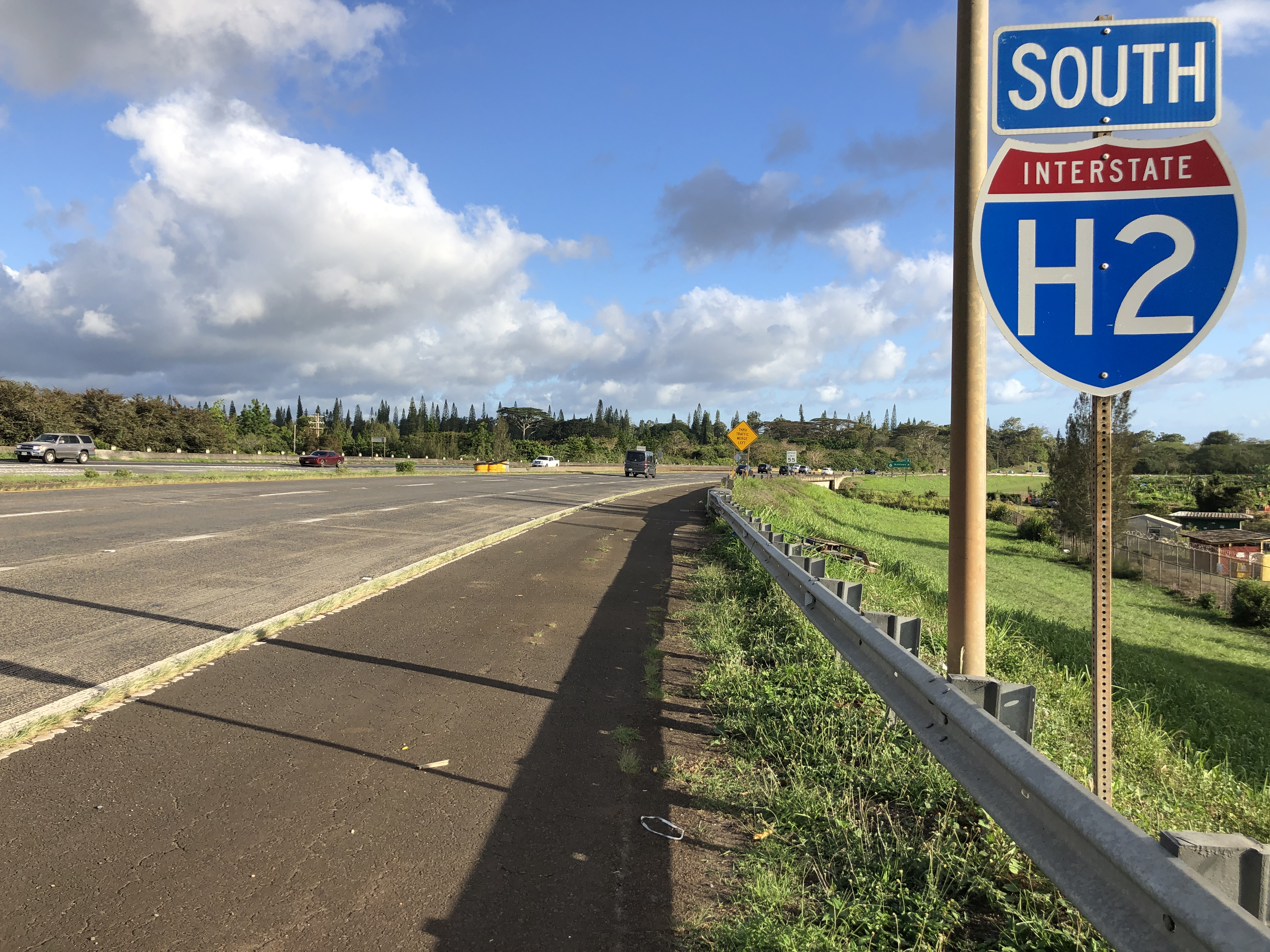
H-2 southbound in Wahiawa

H-2 begins at the Waiawa Interchange with H-1 in Pearl City, adjacent to Leeward Community College on the north side of Pearl Harbor. The eight-lane freeway travels north through the residential Waipio neighborhood and intersects Ka Uka Boulevard near several retailers and warehouses. H-2 then turns northeast and follows the Pānakauahi Gulch as it skirts the foothills of the Koʻolau Range, passing a solar farm and undeveloped land. The freeway turns northwest to cross Kipapa Gulch and bisects a residential neighborhood in the city of Mililani, where it intersects Meheula Parkway. The freeway narrows to four lanes as it approaches Wahiawa and turns north to travel around Wheeler Army Airfield. H-2 terminates after an interchange with Route 99, which continues west on Wilikina Drive to Schofield Barracks.

The freeway is maintained by the Hawaii Department of Transportation (HDOT) and is designated as part of the National Highway System, a network of economically and militarily strategic highways in the U.S. H-2 has a set of high-occupancy vehicle (HOV) lanes between the Waiawa Interchange and Mililani that are active during peak periods on weekdays. Traffic volumes on the highway, measured in terms of annual average daily traffic, ranged in 2020 from a minimum of 36,900 vehicles at its northern terminus to a maximum of 87,900 vehicles at H-1. TheBus, a city-wide bus system, operates several express routes on H-2 between Downtown Honolulu and Wahiawa.

== History ==
=== Planning and funding ===
A set of Interstate Highways on O‘ahu were approved for funding by the U.S. Congress in 1960, a year after Hawaii was admitted as a state. The corridors would connect Honolulu to Naval Air Station Barbers Point to the west, Schofield Barracks to the northwest, Marine Corps Air Station Kaneohe Bay to the northeast, and Diamond Head to the southeast. The Bureau of Public Roads (now the Federal Highway Administration) approved "Interstate H-2" as the designation for the Schofield Barracks corridor on August 29, 1960.

The freeway would be built parallel to a section of the Kamehameha Highway, which opened in 1921 to connect Honolulu to the North Shore and the windward side of the island. A set of three general routing options were presented at a public hearing in October 1962, all to be at least four lanes wide except for a section around Wheeler Army Airfield. The easternmost option, with an estimated cost of $29.2 million (equivalent to $231 million in 2024) was chosen by officials following feedback from the hearing. Construction of H-2 was scheduled to begin in 1967, but federal funding cuts deferred several Interstate projects on O‘ahu, including the Waiawa Interchange and Kipapa section of H-2.

Following the partial restoration of federal funding, HDOT opened bids in November 1967 on construction of the Waiawa Interchange with H-1. The remainder of H-2 remained indefinitely deferred, along with funding for H-3. The federal government allocated $51 million (equivalent to $357 million in 2024) for the entire H-2 project in October 1968, allowing for bidding on other construction contracts to open. The original embankment design of crossings for the Kipapa and Waikakalaua streams near Mililani was later replaced in 1971 with bridges to reduce costs and potential erosion issues. H-2 was described as "Hawaii's forgotten freeway" by local newspapers, as its planning was generally uncontroversial compared to other projects, such as H-3, and did not attract the attention of anti-highway activists.

=== Construction and later projects ===
Construction on the southernmost section of H-2 began in early 1971 with work on the Waiawa Interchange. By June 1973, grading of the Pearl City–Kipapa section of the freeway was nearly complete and contracts for paving and interchange construction were prepared to be released. The remaining projects for H-2, with the exception of the Kipapa Gulch bridge, were contracted by August and under construction by the end of the year. Work on the Waikakalaua Gulch bridge near Mililani began in December 1973, while the Kipapa Gulch bridge began the following year using a cantilevered truss system. Construction on a section of the freeway near Wheeler Army Airfield unearthed the ruins of the Cabrini Chapel, a small church built by Italian prisoners of war housed at Sand Island from 1944 to 1945.

The southernmost section of the freeway, traveling two miles (3.2 km) from the Waiawa Interchange with H-1 to the Mililani Cemetery, was completed in early 1974. It was opened to traffic on October 3, 1974, after a temporary road through the cemetery was finished, connecting H-2 to the Kamehameha Highway near the Mililani Town development. Part of the freeway's northern terminus at the Wahiawa Interchange opened in October 1975 to allow traffic to bypass a congested left turn on the Kamehameha Highway. The final section of the freeway, including the Kipapa Gulch bridge, opened to traffic on February 21, 1977, after a delay while awaiting delivery of a transformer to control its lights. The entirety of H-2 cost an estimated $43 million (equivalent to $173 million in 2024) to construct. The freeway's HOV lanes also opened at the same time, having been added to replace an earlier plan for exclusive bus lanes, but were eliminated in January 1979 due to low use.

Construction of the freeway allowed for residential development in the Waipio Valley and around Mililani, which had been designed in conjunction with H-2 in the late 1960s. A pair of sites along the highway were also considered in the 1970s for the second Oʻahu campus of the University of Hawaiʻi, which was ultimately located at Kapolei. A new interchange with Ka Uka Boulevard was opened in July 1989 to serve new development in Waipio. The Mililani Mauka development opened in the 1990s after development closer to the freeway was approved. The Meheula Parkway interchange was rebuilt in 1993 to accommodate expected traffic and H-2 was widened to read the HOV lanes, which opened in December 1994.

H-2 was designated as the Veterans Memorial Freeway in 2002 by the state government.

== Exit list ==
The entire route is in Honolulu County.

Location	mi	km	Exit	Destinations	Notes
Waipahu	0.0	0.0	1	H-1 – Honolulu, Waianae	Signed as exits 1A (east) and 1B (west); exit 8 on H-1
Waipio	2.4	3.9	2	Ka Uka Boulevard	
Mililani	5.5	8.9	5	Mililani Mauka, Mililani Town	Access via Meheula Parkway; signed as exits 5A (Mauka) and 5B (Town) northbound
Waipio Acres	7.2	11.6	7	Route 99 north / Leilehua Golf Course Road – Mililani Tech Park, Wheeler AAF	Northbound exit and southbound entrance
Wahiawa	7.4– 7.9	11.9– 12.7	8	Route 99 north – Wahiawa	Northbound exit is via Route 80
Wahiawa	8.3	13.4	9	Route 99 south (Kamehameha Highway)	Southbound exit and northbound entrance
Wahiawa	8.3	13.4	—	Route 99 north	Continues north as Wilikina Drive
1.000 mi = 1.609 km; 1.000 km = 0.621 mi: Incomplete access
