= Tripler Army Medical Center =

Hospital in Honolulu, Hawaii

- Defense Health Agency
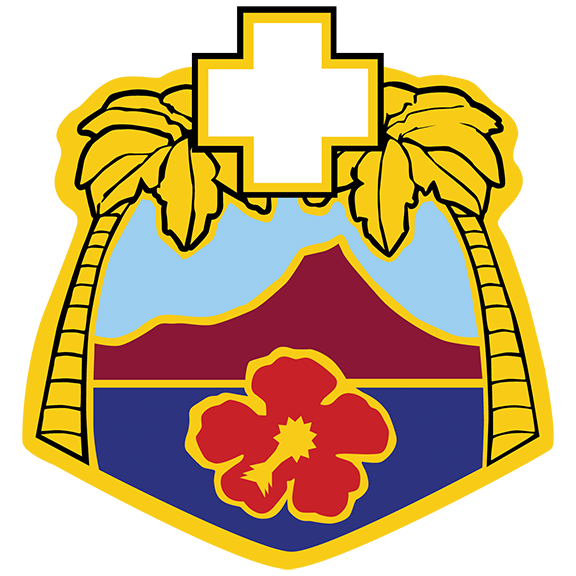

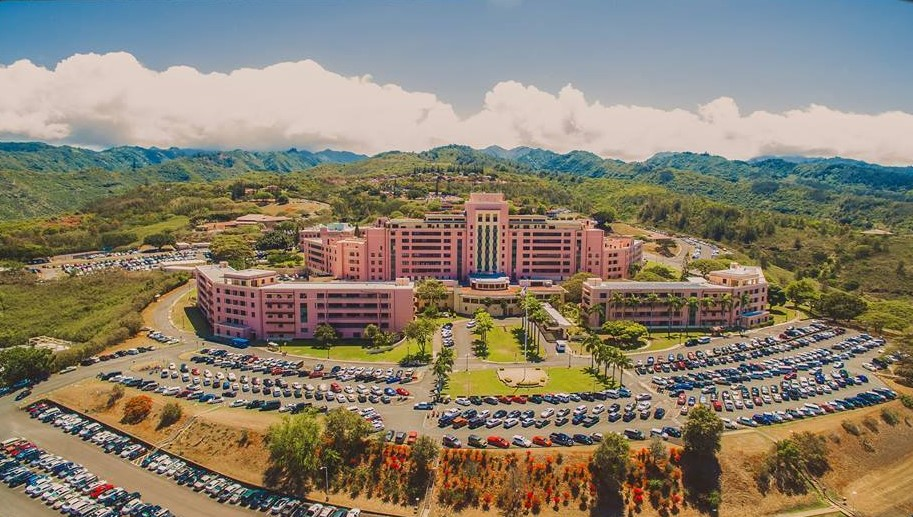
- Main hospital building

Geography
- Location: 1 Jarrett White Road, Honolulu, Hawaii, U.S.
- Coordinates: 21°21′43″N 157°53′22″W

Organisation
- Care system: Tricare
- Type: Military hospital

Services
- Emergency department: Level II Trauma Center
- Beds: 231

Helipads
- Helipad: Yes

History
- Constructed: 1948 (current building)
- Opened: 1907

Links
- Website: www.tamc.amedd.army.mil
- Lists: Hospitals in U.S.

Tripler Army Medical Center (TAMC) is a major United States Department of Defense medical facility administered by the United States Army in the state of Hawaii. It is the tertiary care hospital in the Pacific Rim, serving local active and retired military personnel along with residents of nine U.S. jurisdictions and forces deployed in more than 40 other countries in the region. Located on the slopes of Moanalua Ridge overlooking the Honolulu neighborhoods of Moanalua and Salt Lake, Tripler Army Medical Center's massive coral pink structure can be seen from any point in the Honolulu District. It also serves as headquarters of the Regional Health Command - Pacific. The main hospital facility is within the Honolulu census-designated place.

== History ==
Tripler Hospital was established in 1907, housed in several wooden structures within Fort Shafter on the island of Oʻahu. In 1920 it was named after a legendary American Civil War surgeon, Brevet Brigadier General Charles Stuart Tripler (1806–1866), who made significant contributions to the development of military medicine.

Tripler Army Medical Center was commissioned by Lt. General Robert C. Richardson Jr., who was Military Governor of the Territory of Hawaiʻi during World War II. General Richardson hired the New York City based architectural firm of York & Sawyer to design the medical complex. The local landscape architect Robert O. Thompson designed the landscape to be "one of the great beauty spots of Hawaii", although his plans were never fully realized. At the outbreak of World War II, Tripler Army Medical Center had a 450-bed capacity which then expanded to 1,000 beds through the addition of barracks-type buildings.

=== Present Day ===
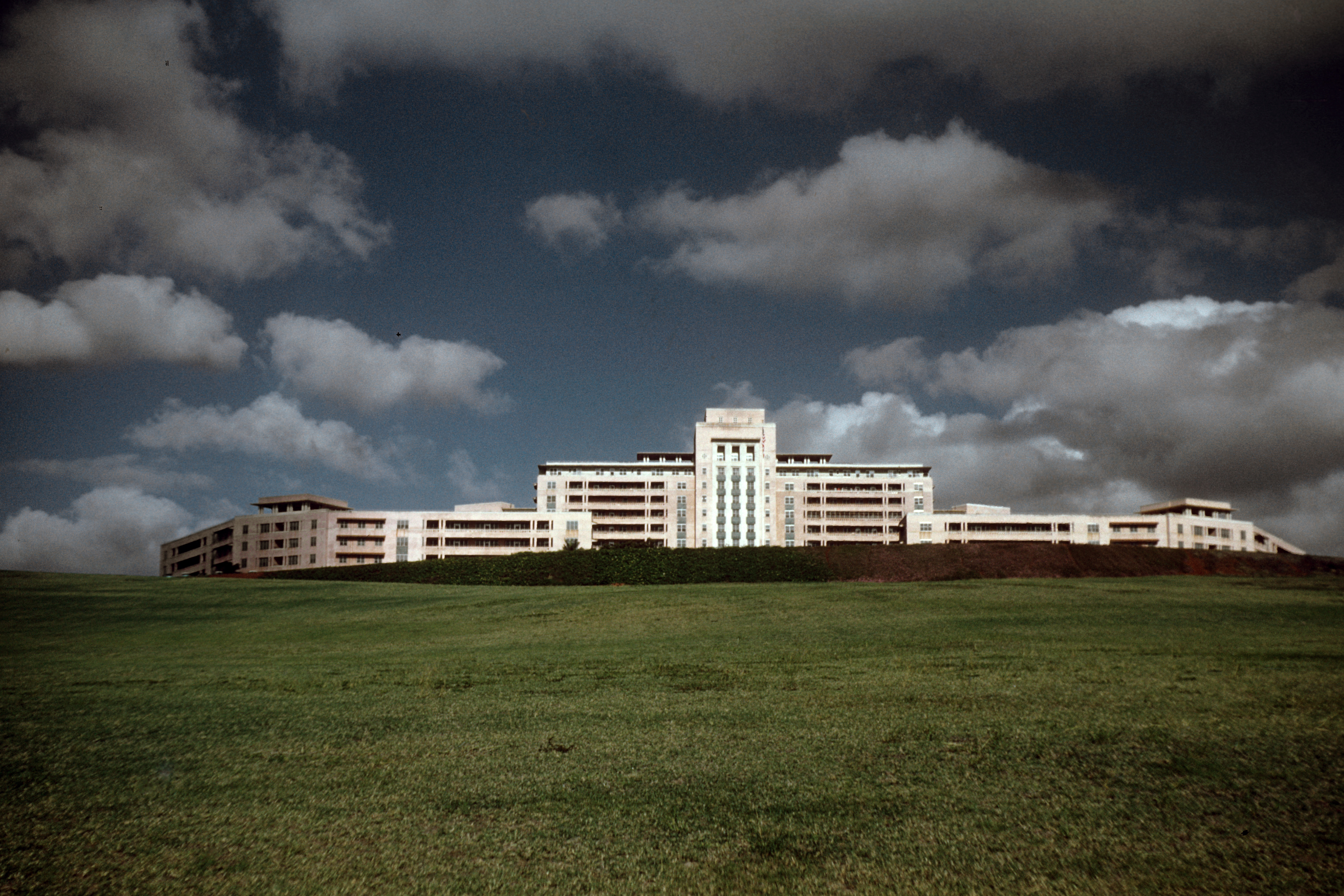
Tripler Army Medical Center in 1960

Plans for the new Tripler Army Medical Center on Moanalua Ridge were drawn in 1942 and construction was completed in 1948. The General Bronze Corporation fabricated the aluminum windows for the Tripler Army Base Hospital

In 1959, the original hospital was demolished to make way for expansion of Moanalua Road (now Interstate H-201).

== Education ==
The installation has housing within the premises. Hawaii Department of Education operates public schools for dependent children of service members. As of 2016, zoned schools are Moanalua Elementary School, Moanalua Middle School, and Moanalua High School.

== See also ==
- List of hospitals in Hawaii
