= Interstate H-1 =

Interstate Highway in Hawaii, US

Interstate H-1
- H-1 highlighted in red

Route information
- Maintained by HDOT
- Length: 27.16 mi (43.71 km)
- Existed: 1960–present
- History: Completed in 1986
- NHS: Entire route

Major junctions
- West end: Route 93 in Kapolei
- H-2 in Waipahu; H-3 / H-201 in Aiea
- East end: Route 72 in Honolulu

Location
- Country: United States
- State: Hawaii
- Counties: Honolulu

Highway system
- Interstate Highway System; Main; Auxiliary; Suffixed; Business; Future; Routes in Hawaii
← Route 8930	→ H-2

Interstate H-1 (H-1) is the longest and busiest Interstate Highway in the US state of Hawaii. The highway is located on the island of Oʻahu and runs for a length of 27.16 miles (43.71 km). Despite the number, this is an east–west highway. The H-series (for Hawaii) numbering reflects the order in which routes were funded and built. H-1 goes from Route 93 (Farrington Highway) in Kapolei to Route 72 (Kalanianaole Highway) in Kāhala.

East of Middle Street in Honolulu (exit 19A), H-1 is also known as the Lunalilo Freeway, after the former Hawaiian king. H-1 is sometimes signed as such at older signs in central Honolulu. West of Middle Street, H-1 is also known as the Queen Liliʻuokalani Freeway, after the former Hawaiian queen. This name is shown on some roadmaps. It is both the southernmost and westernmost signed Interstate Highway located in the US.

== Route description ==
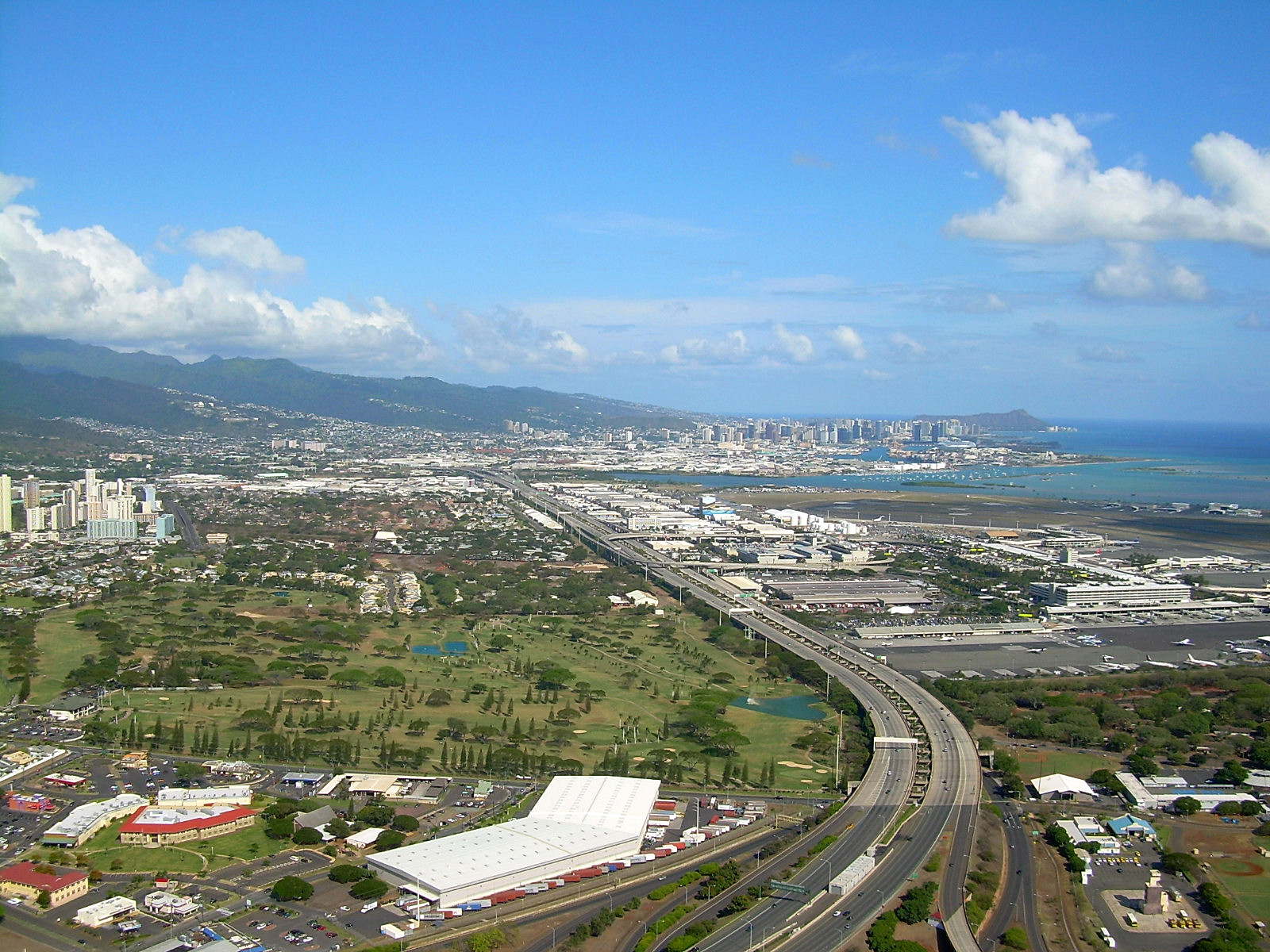
An aerial view of H-1, looking east from Daniel K. Inouye International Airport, heading into Downtown Honolulu

H-1 begins near the Campbell Industrial Park in the town of Kapolei. West of this point, Route 93 (Farrington Highway) continues toward Waianae. The freeway continues east, passing the community of Makakilo until reaching the junction with Route 750 (north to Kunia Camp) and Route 76 (south to ʻEwa Beach).

H-1 then continues along the northern edge of Waipahu approximately three miles (4.8 km) until its junction with H-2. It then continues east through the towns of Pearl City and Aiea for approximately five miles (8.0 km) to the complex Halawa Interchange, where it meets H-3 and H-201. The highway then turns south for two miles (3.2 km), then east soon after the exits for Hickam Air Force Base and Pearl Harbor. At this point, the highway runs along a viaduct above Route 92 (Nimitz Highway), passing to the north of Daniel K. Inouye International Airport.

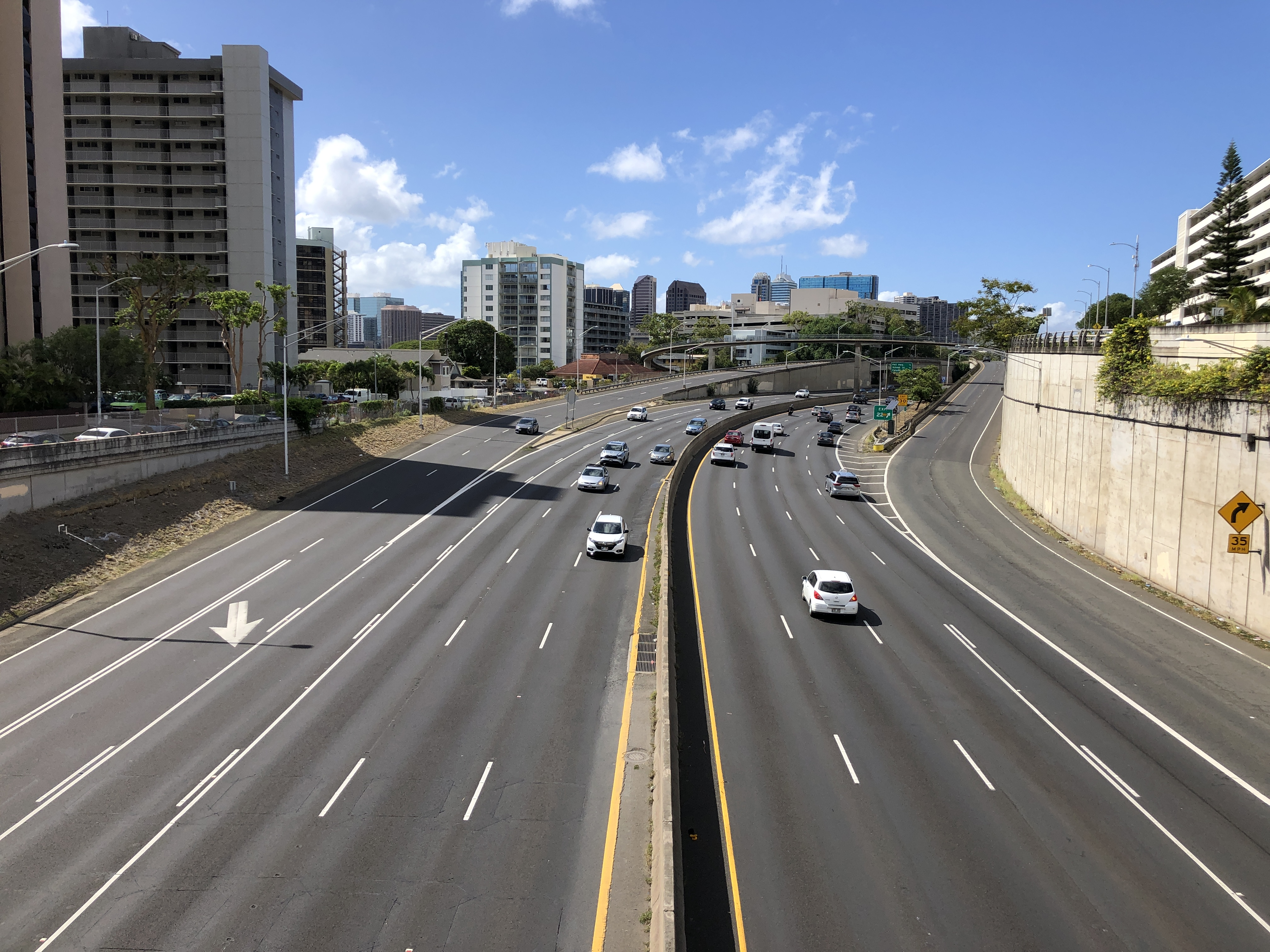
H-1 westbound viewed from Ward Avenue near Downtown Honolulu

Two miles (3.2 km) past the airport exit, three lanes exit the freeway at exit 18A to join Nimitz Highway toward Waikiki. Half a mile (0.80 km) later, the remaining two lanes make a sharp turn south as H-1 reaches another major interchange with the east end of H-201. Access is provided by a left exit from H-1 east only. H-1 west does not have access to H-201 at this point.

From here, H-1 runs through the city of Honolulu along a series of underpasses and viaducts. A flyover interchange leading to Downtown Honolulu has a westbound exit and an eastbound entrance. H-1 ends in the Kāhala district of Honolulu near Kahala Mall, where Route 72 (Kalanianaole Highway) ends.

During morning commute hours on weekdays, an eastbound contraflow express lane is deployed from just east of exit 5 to exit 18A, where it connects to the beginning of the Nimitz Highway contraflow lane. The H-1 contraflow lane is often referred to as a "zipper lane" due to the use of a movable concrete barrier and a zipper machine. The H-1 and Nimitz Highway contraflow lanes are restricted to buses, motorcycles, and high-occupancy vehicles with two or more occupants while in operation.

== History ==
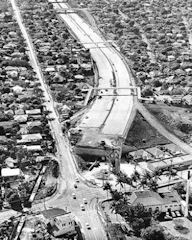
A 1965 photo of H-1 under construction, looking eastbound, ending at Harding and Kapahulu avenues.

In 1960, a set of Interstate Highways serving Oʻahu were authorized by the federal government, a year after Hawaii was admitted as a state. One of the corridors, connecting Barbers Point to Diamond Head, was designated as H-1 by the Bureau of Public Roads, now the Federal Highway Administration, in August 1960. The portion of H-1 that runs through Downtown Honolulu had opened in 1953 as the Mauka Arterial and was incorporated into the new freeway. This section has been largely unchanged since its inception and its design suffers from having too many on/offramps, short distanced onramps, and onramps that enter the freeway almost immediately before an offramp (opposite of current design standards). The 'new' section of H-1 was built to contemporary freeway standards.

In 1963, construction on the first new section of H-1 began, shortly after alignments were approved for most of the freeway. In 1965, the Lunalilo Freeway, already planned by the state government and funded with a 50-percent match from the federal government, was incorporated into plans for H-1 following the rejection of five other proposed routings. The westernmost section of H-1 in Makakilo opened on September 29, 1966.

In October 1967, the Kapiolani Interchange opened, filling a gap between two sections of the Lunalilo Freeway spanning three miles (4.8 km) in Honolulu. Another gap in H-1 was filled in March 1969 with the opening of three miles (4.8 km) between Kunia Road (Route 76) and the Waiawa Interchange with H-2.

The Hawaiian Interstate shields have gone through several changes. Early shields contained the hyphen as per the official designation, e.g., H-1. These shields have been updated with the hyphen removed, e.g., H1. As in other states across the contiguous US, early Interstate shields also included the writing of 'Hawaii' above the Interstate route number and below the 'Interstate' writing. While the "Queen Liliʻuokalani" section of H-1 has signs designating it as such (one eastbound at exit 1, the other westbound after exit 19), there are no similar name signs for the Lunalilo Freeway portion (the remainder of the freeway).

== Interstate H-4 ==
Interstate 4
- Location: Honolulu
- Length: 6.5 mi (10.5 km)

In the 1960s, a fourth freeway that would have been Interstate H-4 (H-4) was proposed for the city of Honolulu. The intent of H-4 was to provide relief to the congested H-1 through Downtown Honolulu. Had it been built, the 6.5-mile-long (10.5 km) route of H-4 would have started at exit 18 (H-1/Nimitz Highway interchange) and followed the Honolulu waterfront to the Kapiolani interchange (exit 25B). The idea was unpopular and the freeway was never built.

== Exit list ==
The entire route is in Honolulu County.

Location	mi	km	Exit	Destinations	Notes
Kapolei	0.00	0.00		Farrington Highway (Route 93 west) / Laaloa Street	Continuation beyond western terminus
Kapolei	0.00	0.00	1A	Kalaeloa Boulevard – Kalaeloa Airport, Barbers Point Harbor (Route 95), Campbell Industrial Park	Signed as exit 1 westbound
Kapolei	1.12	1.80	1B	Wakea Street – Makakilo, Kapolei, Kalaeloa	No westbound entrance; signed as exit 1D westbound
Kapolei			1E	Farrington Highway (Route 93 west) – Wet'n'Wild Hawaii	Westbound exit only
Kapolei	2.21	3.56	2	Makakilo Drive – Kalaeloa Airport	No eastbound exit
Kapolei			3	Kualakai Parkway (Route 8930 south) – Kapolei, Ewa, University of Hawaiʻi at West Oʻahu	Formerly North–South Road
Waipahu	6.49	10.44	5	Route 750 north / Route 76 south – Kunia, Waipahu, Ewa	Southern terminus of Route 750; northern terminus of Route 76; signed as exits 5A (south) and 5B (north) westbound
Waipahu	8.20	13.20	7	Waikele, Waipahu	
Waipahu	9.40	15.13	8A	Farrington Highway (Route 7101 west) – Waipahu	No westbound entrance; eastern terminus of Route 7101
Waipahu			8A	Kamehameha Highway (Route 99 east) – Pearl City	Eastbound exit and westbound entrance
Waipahu	9.74	15.68	8B	H-2 north – Mililani, Wahiawa, North Shore	Eastbound signage; southern terminus of H-2; signed as exit 8A westbound
Waipahu			8B	Farrington Highway (Route 7101 west) / Kamehameha Highway (Route 99 north) – Waipahu, Waipio	Westbound signage
Waipahu			8C	Kamehameha Highway (Route 99 north) – Waipio	No westbound entrance
Waimalu	11.62	18.70	10	Waimalu, Pearlridge, Pearl City	
Aiea	14.20	22.85	13A	H-201 west – Aiea, Pearl Harbor Historic Sites, Pearlridge	No westbound entrance; western terminus of H-201
Aiea			13A	H-3 east to H-201 east – Kaneohe, Moanalua	Western terminus of H-3; signed as exit 13B westbound
Halawa	14.61	23.51	13B	Halawa Heights, Stadium (H-201)	No westbound exit
Honolulu	16.06	25.85	15	Nimitz Highway (Route 92 east) – Pearl Harbor Historic Sites	Eastbound exit and westbound entrance
Honolulu	16.65	26.80	15A	Kamehameha Highway (Route 99 west) – Stadium, Pearl Harbor Historic Sites	Westbound exit and eastbound entrance; eastern terminus of Route 99
Honolulu	16.85	27.12	15B	Nimitz Highway (Route 92 west) – Joint Base Pearl Harbor–Hickam	Military access only; signed as exit 15 eastbound
Honolulu	17.77	28.60	16	Airport	
Honolulu	19.12– 19.60	30.77– 31.54	18A	Nimitz Highway (Route 92) – Waikiki	Signed as exit 18 westbound
Honolulu	19.34	31.12	18B	Middle Street (Route 7415), Dillingham Boulevard	Eastbound exit and westbound entrance
Honolulu	20.36	32.77	19A	Middle Street (Route 7415)	Westbound exit only
Honolulu	20.36	32.77	19B	H-201 west – Fort Shafter, Aiea	Westbound left exit and eastbound left entrance; eastern terminus of H-201
Honolulu	20.56	33.09	20A	Likelike Highway (Route 63 north) – Bishop Museum	Southern terminus of Route 63
Honolulu			20B	Houghtailing Street	Westbound exit and eastbound entrance
Honolulu	20.80	33.47	20B	Vineyard Boulevard (Route 98 east) – Chinatown	Eastbound exit and westbound entrance; western terminus of Route 98
Honolulu	21.35	34.36	20C	Palama Street	Westbound exit only
Honolulu	22.31	35.90	21A	School Street – Chinatown	Westbound exit and eastbound entrance
Honolulu			21A	Pali Highway (Route 61)	Signed as exit 21B westbound
Honolulu	22.77	36.64	21B	Punchbowl Street	Eastbound exit and westbound entrance
Honolulu			22	Vineyard Boulevard (Route 98 west)	Westbound exit and eastbound entrance; eastern terminus of Route 98
Honolulu	23.10	37.18	22	Kinau Street – Waikiki	Eastbound exit and entrance
Honolulu			23	Lunalilo Street	No eastbound exit
Honolulu	24.06	38.72	23	Punahou Street – Manoa, Waikiki	Eastbound exit and westbound entrance
Honolulu	25.07	40.35	24A	Bingham Street	Eastbound exit and westbound entrance
Honolulu			24A	Wilder Avenue	Westbound exit only
Honolulu	25.30	40.72	24B	University Avenue – University of Hawaiʻi at Mānoa	
Honolulu	25.62	41.23	25A	King Street – Waikiki, Honolulu Zoo	
Honolulu			25B	Kapiolani Boulevard – Waikiki	Westbound exit and eastbound entrance
Honolulu	26.10	42.00	25B	6th Avenue – Kaimuki	Eastbound exit and westbound entrance
Honolulu	26.83	43.18	26A	Koko Head Avenue – Kaimuki	Eastbound exit and westbound entrance
Honolulu	27.53	44.31	26B	Waialae Avenue – Waialae, Kahala, Kaimuki	Signed as exit 26 westbound
Honolulu	28.16	45.32	27	Kilauea Avenue – Waialae, Kahala	Westbound exit and eastbound entrance
Honolulu				Kalanianaole Highway (Route 72 east) / Waikui Street / Ainakoa Avenue	At-grade intersection; highway continues east as Route 72
1.000 mi = 1.609 km; 1.000 km = 0.621 mi: Incomplete access

== Auxiliary routes ==
- A portion of the Moanalua Freeway is designated as H-201. Until mid-2004, it was signed as Route 78.
