= Hawaii Route 92 =

State highway on Oahu, Hawaii, US

Hawaii Route 92

Route information
- Maintained by HDOT
- Length: 9.3 mi (15.0 km)

Major junctions
- West end: JB Pearl Harbor–Hickam in Honolulu
- H-1 / Route 99 in Honolulu
- East end: Kalakaua Avenue in Honolulu

Location
- Country: United States
- State: Hawaii
- Counties: Honolulu

Highway system
- Routes in Hawaii
← Route 83	→ Route 93

Route 92 is a major east–west highway on the island of Oahu which begins at exit 15 off Interstate H-1 (H-1) in Honolulu. The western end of the highway is located at the gate to Joint Base Pearl Harbor–Hickam and the eastern end is 0.6 miles (0.97 km) east of the Ala Wai Canal crossing in Waikiki. The western portion of the highway, west of Richards Street, is named the Nimitz Highway (in honor of Chester Nimitz, the Pacific Fleet Admiral during World War II). East of Richards Street, Route 92 is also known as Ala Moana Boulevard.

== History ==
The route was constructed in the 1940s during World War II to serve military facilities and the local airport. There were plans in the 1960s to extend the road east of the Ala Moana Center mall toward H-1 once again, but those plans were dropped by the late 1970s.

== Route description ==
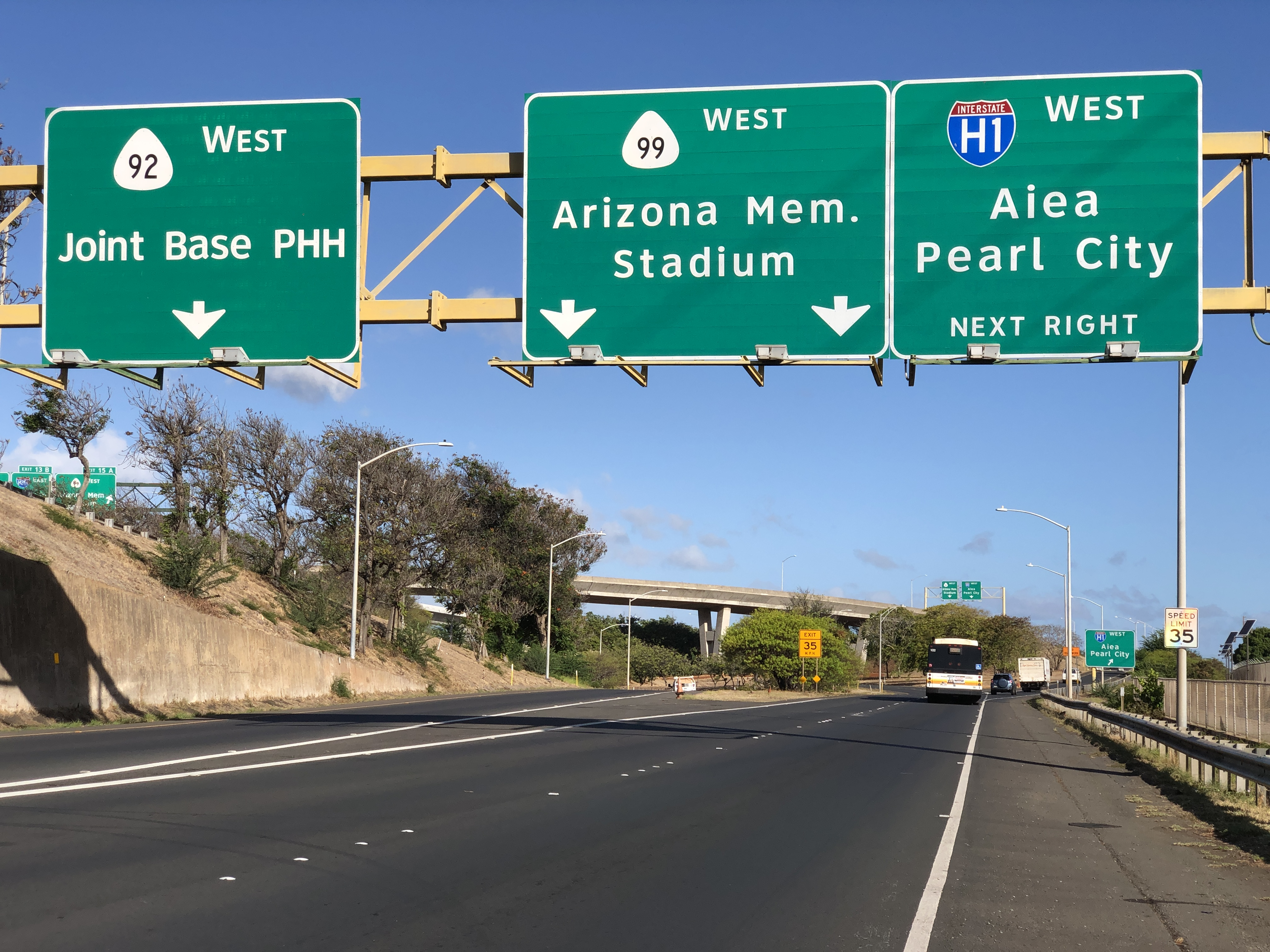
Route 92 westbound at Route 99

After exiting H-1, Route 92 goes past the Pearl Harbor Naval Base and Hickam Air Force Base gates. Route 92 goes under the Airport Viaduct (H-1) and serves primary route for Honolulu International Airport. Route 92 briefly runs underneath H-1 before exiting again at exit 18. Heading east, Route 92 enters into the Port of Honolulu and downtown Honolulu. After crossing the Ala Wai Canal to Waikiki, Route 92 ends, and county jurisdiction is transferred at that point.

== Major intersections ==
The entire route is in Honolulu, Honolulu County.

mi	km	Destinations	Notes
0.0	0.0	Naval Base	Restricted access
0.5	0.80	Hickam AFB	Interchange with O'Malley Boulevard; westbound exit and eastbound entrance
0.8	1.3	H-1 / Route 99 west – Aiea, Pearl City, Honolulu, Arizona Memorial, Stadium	No westbound access to H-1 east; exit 15 on H-1
1.8	2.9	Rodgers Boulevard – Airport	
2.9	4.7	Puuloa Road – Honolulu	
3.2	5.1	H-1 east / Dillingham Boulevard (Route 7401) – Honolulu	Eastbound exit and westbound entrance; exit 18 on H-1
3.7	6.0	H-1 west – Airport, Pearl Harbor	Westbound exit and eastbound entrance; exit 18A on H-1
4.0	6.4	Route 64 south (Sand Island Access Road) – U.S. Coast Guard I.S.C.	Northern terminus of Route 64
4.4	7.1	Route 63 north to Kalihi Street east / H-1	Southern terminus of Route 63
6.5	10.5	Alakea Street (Route 7504) – Downtown Honolulu	
9.3	15.0	Kalakaua Avenue (Route 7612) / Pau Street (Route 7715) to Kuhio Avenue / Ala Wai Boulevard	
1.000 mi = 1.609 km; 1.000 km = 0.621 mi: Incomplete access
