= Kamehameha Highway =

State highway on Oʻahu, Hawaii, US

Kamehameha Highway
- Kamehameha Highway highlighted in red

Route information
- Maintained by HDOT
- Component highways: Route 99 from Honolulu to Hale‘iwa; Route 80 in Wahiawā; Route 83 from Wahiawā to Maunawili; Route 830 from Kahalu‘u to Kāne‘ohe

Major junctions
- Loop around O‘ahu Central Valley
- From: H-1 / Route 92 in Honolulu
- H-201 in Hālawa; H-1 / H-2 in Pearl City; H-2 in Wahiawā; Route 801 near Whitmore Village; Route 63 in Kāne‘ohe; H-3 in Kāne‘ohe
- To: Route 61 in Maunawili

Location
- Country: United States
- State: Hawaii

Highway system
- Routes in Hawaii
← Route 98	→ Route 130
← Route 78	→ Route 83
← Route 80	→ Route 92
← Route 750	→ Route 901

Kamehameha Highway is one of the main highways serving suburban and rural O‘ahu in the U.S. state of Hawai‘i. Informally known as Kam Highway, it begins at Nimitz Highway near Pearl Harbor and Hickam Air Force Base in Honolulu, serves the island's older western suburbs, and turns north across the O‘ahu Central Valley to the North Shore. At the North Shore, Kamehameha Highway heads northeast around the northern tip of O‘ahu, then southeast to and just beyond Kāne‘ohe Bay on the windward coast. The road was named after King Kamehameha I.

A short detached segment of the Kamehameha Highway exists for a few blocks in the Honolulu neighborhood of Kalihi. This segment runs as a short extension of Dillingham Boulevard from Pu‘uhale Road (near the O‘ahu Community Correctional Center) to exit 18B on Interstate H-1. This section was contiguous with the rest of the highway before the construction of the H-1 viaduct.

== Route description ==
=== Route 99 (Honolulu to Hale‘iwa) ===
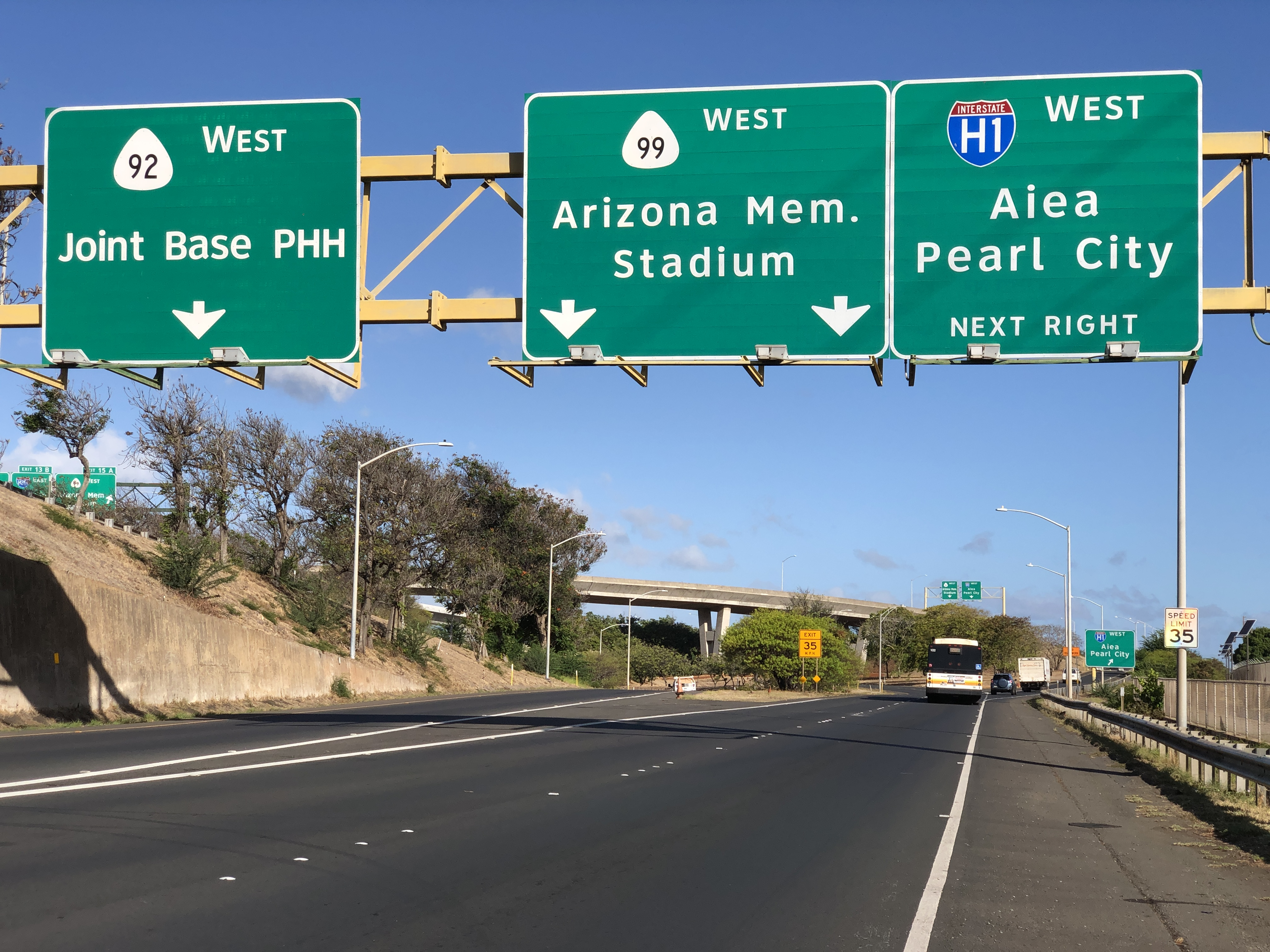
The south end of Route 99 at Route 92

As Route 99, Kamehameha Highway begins at its southern terminus at the Pearl Harbor interchange of Interstate H-1 near Pearl Harbor and Hickam Air Force Base. The highway runs north past the Pearl Harbor historic sites such as the USS Arizona Memorial and the USS Bowfin, the Admiral Clarey Bridge to Ford Island leading to the USS Missouri, and Aloha Stadium. The highway then turns west through the suburbs of ‘Aiea and Pearl City, passing Pearlridge Center, the state's second largest shopping mall.

After passing Pearl City and the interchange with Interstate H-2 near Waipahu, Route 99 turns north through the central O‘ahu suburbs of Waipi‘o and Mililani. South of Wahiawā near Wheeler Army Airfield, the named Kamehameha Highway continues through Wahiawā as Route 80, while Route 99 (as Wilikina Drive and Kamananui Road) bypasses Wahiawā on the west, rejoining Kamehameha Highway north of Whitmore Village. It then continues north through pineapple fields and former sugar cane fields to the junction with Route 83 near Hale‘iwa.

=== Route 80 (Wahiawā) ===
As Route 80, Kamehameha Highway begins at the interchange with Interstate H-2 and Route 99 and passes through central Wahiawā and passing Whitmore Village before rejoining Route 99 north of Wahiawā.

=== Route 83 (Hale‘iwa to Kāne‘ohe) ===
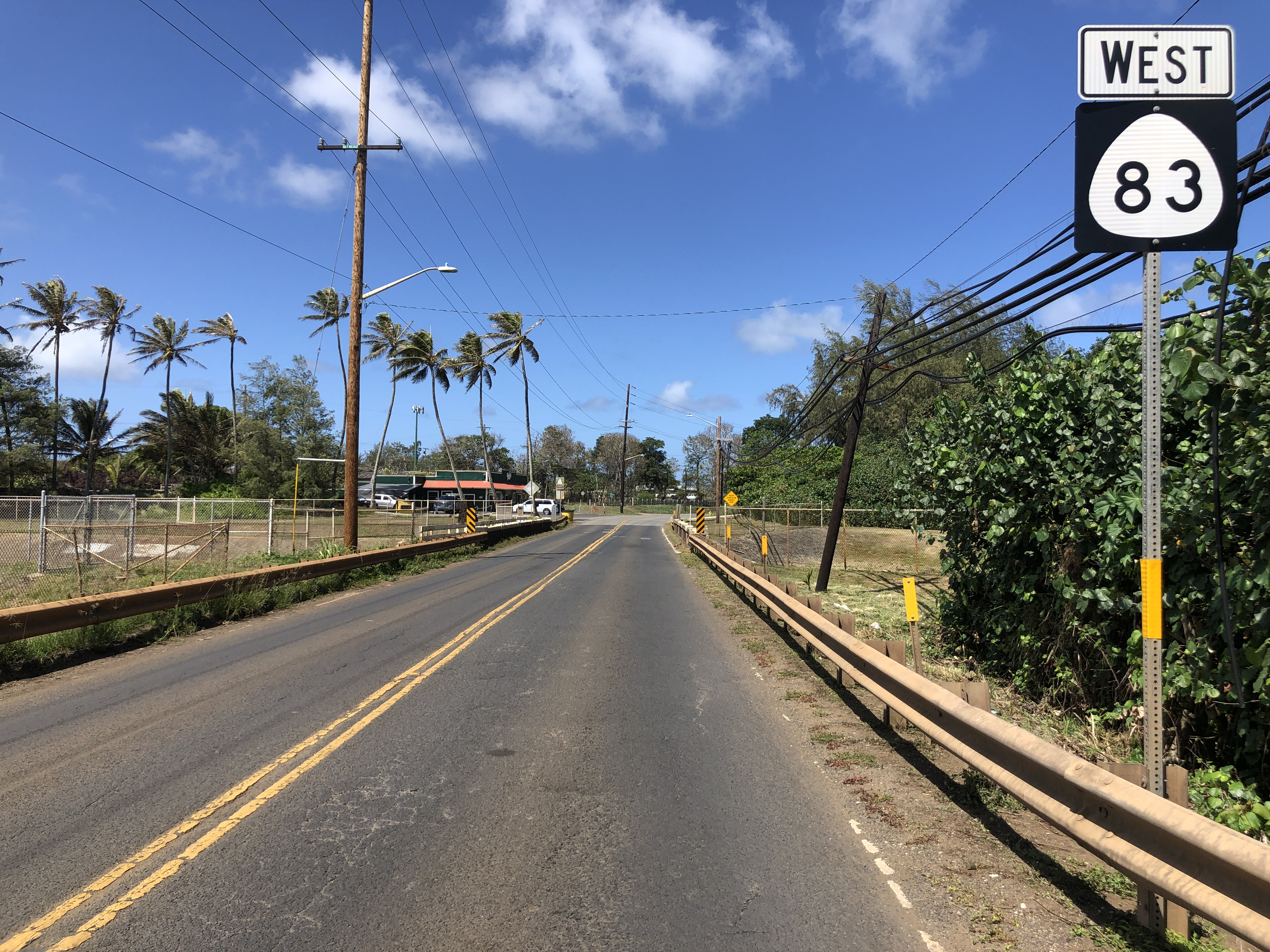
Route 83 westbound in Lā‘ie

Originally, Kamehameha Highway continued as Route 83 at the junction with Route 99 at Weed Junction in Hale‘iwa, passing through Hale‘iwa up the North Shore. Since 1995, Route 83 begins inland from Weed Junction as the Joseph P. Leong Highway and bypasses Hale‘iwa town on the inland side, rejoining Kamehameha Highway north of Hale‘iwa.

From Hale‘iwa, Kamehameha Highway passes Waimea Bay, Sunset Beach, and the Turtle Bay Resort at the northern tip of O‘ahu before heading down the Windward Coast communities of Lā‘ie, Hau‘ula, Punalu‘u, and Ka‘a‘awa.

At Kahalu‘u, Kamehameha Highway follows the coastline through He‘eia and the main commercial district of Kāne‘ohe (this segment was formerly Route 836), while Route 83 continues as Kahekili Highway bypassing Kāne‘ohe town to the west before reaching the junction with Likelike Highway (Route 63). Route 83 rejoins Kamehameha Highway in Kāne‘ohe and continues south to the interchange with Interstate H-3 and the eastern terminus at Route 61.

=== Route 830 ===
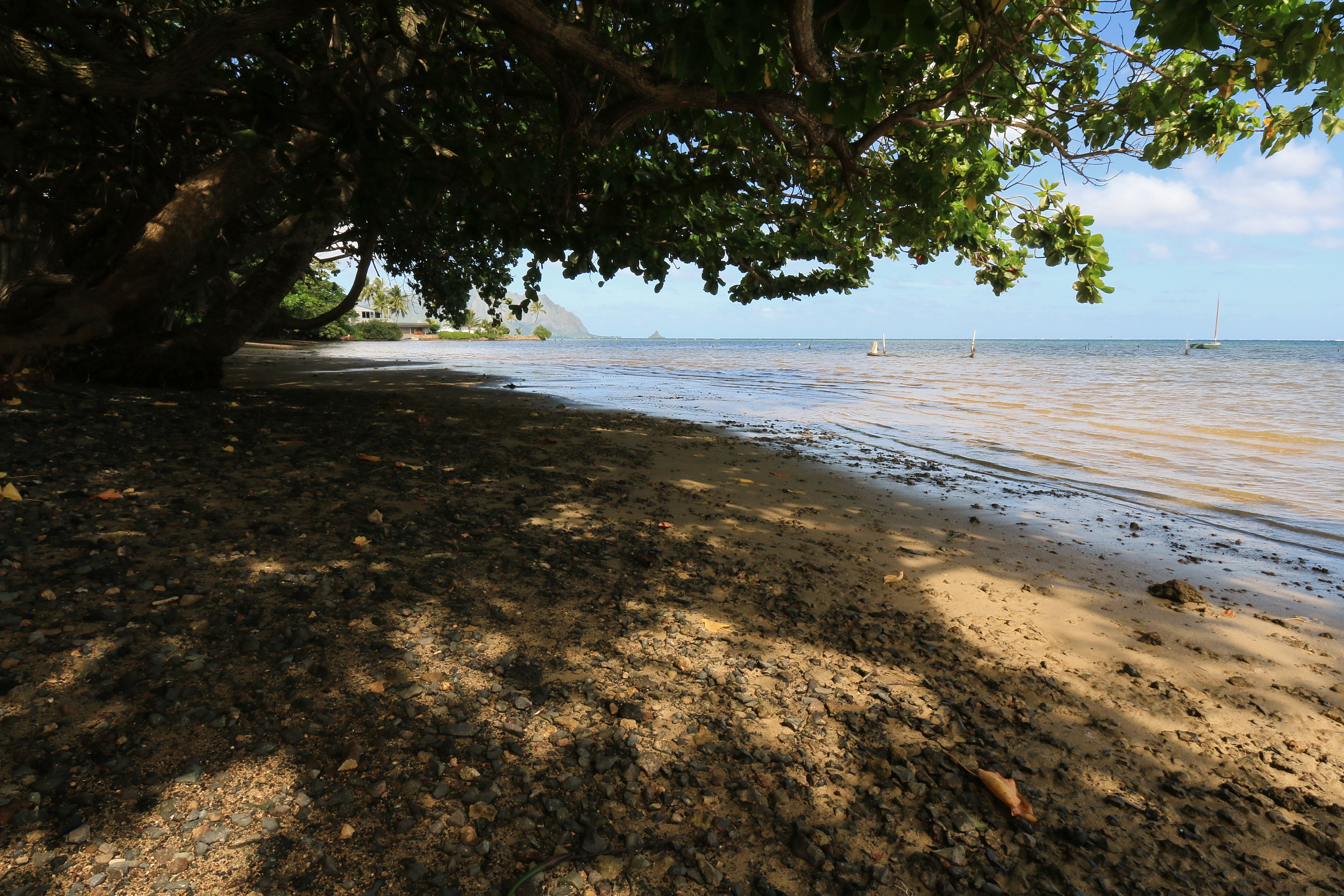
View of Kāne‘ohe Bay from Route 830

Hawaii Route 830 is a 5.5-mile-long (8.9 km) north–south route on the island of O‘ahu, Hawai‘i. Its northern terminus is with Route 83, near Kahalu‘u. It then continues southward along the shore of the Kāne‘ohe Bay, until its southern terminus with Routes 63 and 83, only 1.5 miles away from Interstate H-3.

== Major intersections ==
The entire route is in Honolulu County.

Location	mi	km	Destinations	Notes
Honolulu	0.0	0.0	H-1 east / Route 92 – Honolulu, Airport, Hickam AFB, Naval Base	Southern terminus of Route 99 and Kamehameha Highway; exit 15A on H-1
Halawa	1.9– 2.4	3.1– 3.9	H-201 / Route 78 east to H-1 – ‘Aiea, Honolulu	Interchange; eastern terminus of H-201 / Route 78
Pearl City	5.3	8.5	H-1 west / H-2 north – Wai‘anae, Mililani, Wahiawā	Access via spur road; exits 8A-C on H-1; no eastbound access to H-1 west
Pearl City	6.1	9.8	H-1 east – Honolulu	Eastbound exit and westbound entrance; exit 8B on H-1
Pearl City	6.4	10.3	Route 7101 west – Waipahu	interchange; eastern terminus of Route 7101
Waipio Acres	12.8	20.6	To H-2 south – Honolulu	Access via Leilehua Road; to H-2 exit 8
Wahiawa	13.6	21.9	H-2 south / Route 99 north (Wilikina Drive) – Honolulu, Kunia, Schofield Barracks	Route 99 leaves Kamehameha Highway; southern terminus of Route 80; northern terminus of H-2
Whitmore Village	14.7	23.7	Route 7012 east (Whitmore Avenue) – Whitmore Village, U.S. Naval Communication Station	Western terminus of Route 7012
	15.3	24.6	Kaukonahua Road (Route 801 west) – Waialua	Eastern terminus of Route 801
	15.6	25.1	Route 99 south – Schofield Barracks, Honolulu	Route 99 rejoins Kamehameha Highway; northern terminus of Route 80
Waialua	22.1	35.6	Route 83 north (Joseph P. Leong Highway) – Kahuku	Northern terminus of Route 99; southern terminus of Route 83
Waialua	22.3	35.9	Kaukonahua Road (Route 930 south) / Waialua Beach Road (Route 82 west) – Hale‘iwa, Mokulē‘ia	Weed Circle; termini of Routes 930 and 82
Haleiwa	24.2	38.9	Route 83 south – Wahiawā	Route 83 joins Kamehameha Highway
Kahaluu	58.7	94.5	Route 83 south	Route 83 leaves Kamehameha Highway; northern terminus of Route 830
Kaneohe	64.3	103.5	Route 63 west / Route 83 north (Likelike Highway) – Honolulu, Pearl Harbor, North Shore	Route 83 rejoins Kamehameha Highway; termini of Routes 830 and 63
Kaneohe	65.7	105.7	H-3 – Kailua, Kāne‘ohe MCBH, Pearl Harbor	Exit 11 on H-3
Maunawili	66.6	107.2	Route 61 (Pali Highway) – Kailua, Waimanalo, Honolulu	Southern terminus of Route 83 and Kamehameha Highway
1.000 mi = 1.609 km; 1.000 km = 0.621 mi

== See also ==
- List of Hawaii state highways
