= Moanalua =

Neighborhood of Honolulu, Hawaii, United States

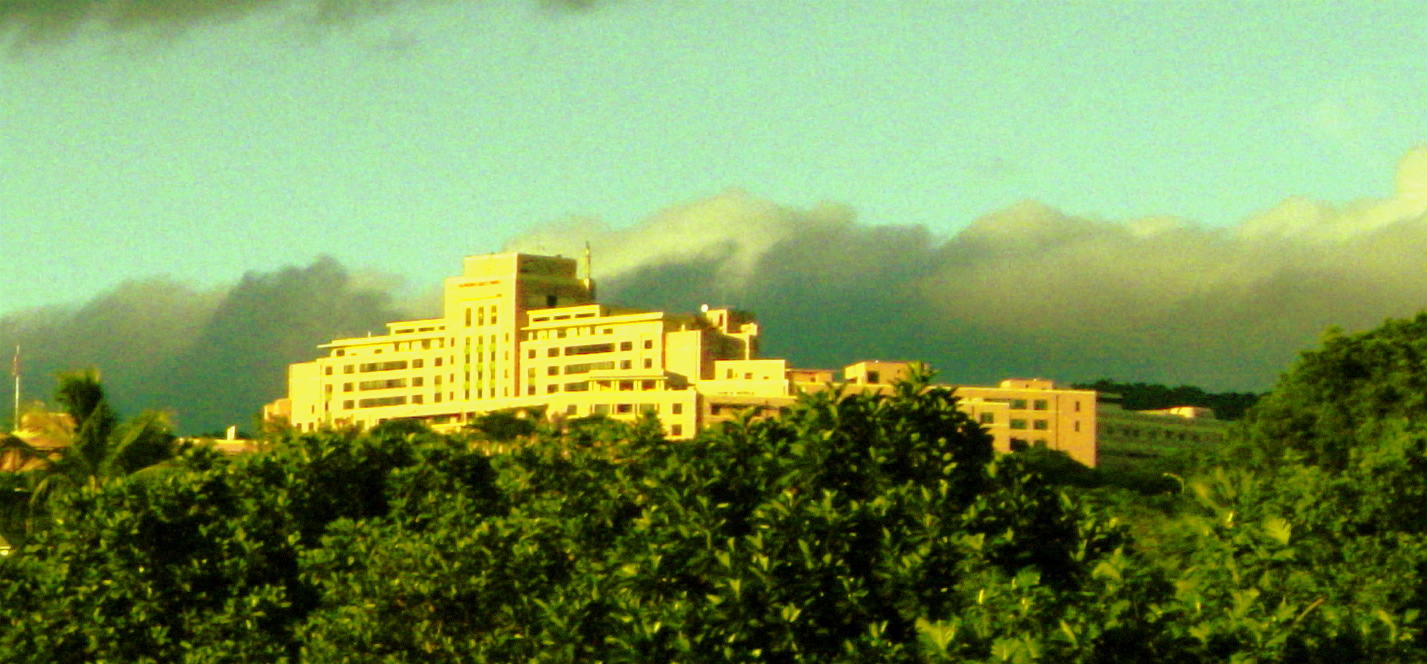
Tripler Army Medical Center viewed from Moanalua Gardens at sunset

Moanalua is a valley, a stream, an ahupuaʻa, and a residential neighborhood in Honolulu, Hawaiʻi. The valley extends inland from behind Āliapaʻakai crater (Salt Lake) to the crest of the Koʻolau Range.

Neighboring areas include Māpunapuna and Salt Lake on the south, Fort Shafter on the east, and Red Hill and Hālawa Valley on the west.

Moanalua is a part of the 15th District of the Hawaii Senate, currently represented by State Senator Glenn Wakai. It is also a part of the 32nd District of the Hawaii House of Representatives, currently represented by Linda Ichiyama.

== Location ==
The Moanalua neighborhood includes a portion that extends up Ala Aolani Street into the valley 21°22′0″N 157°53′36″W, and another part that extends eastward along the lower slopes of the interfluve (slopes between valleys) to Fort Shafter and into the small valley of Manaiki Stream. The latter part includes Tripler Army Medical Center above the neighborhood and Moanalua Gardens below it.

== History ==
Samuel Mills Damon inherited the ahupuaʻa (uplands-to-sea tract) of Moanalua in 1884 from Ke Aliʻi, Bernice Pauahi Bishop, whose husband Charles Reed Bishop was a business partner of Damon. Before her, since the lands were won in battle by Kamehameha I they passed from a number of figures, then to Prince Lot Kapuāiwa (who became King Kamehameha V), and then to Princess Ruth Keʻelikōlani after Kamehameha V's passing.

Damon later became one of the first trustees of the Kamehameha Schools established by the Bishops. The Damon estate sold much of Moanalua to commercial and residential developers in 1956. Moanalua Elementary School was established in the area in 1884.

== Wai'apuka ==
- Wai'apuka, or Waipuka, is a series of three ponds which are a small part of Kamanaiki stream. It is a picturesque site, and the water comes from an underground artesian spring. There is also a Heiau further beyond the ponds. It was once considered a bathing grounds for Aliʻi.
- To get to the ponds there is a trail that takes about 15–30 minutes to hike located off of Onipa'a Street.
- Excerpt from 'Sites of Oahu': "Up in the valley (Kamanaiki) are three streams called Wai-a-puka, seen with three pools; Pool one is a big one by its own hill side, pool two is a little smaller with its own hill side and pool three is still smaller. Your writer learned that this was where the chiefs bathed. The land before coming to it looked as though it was thickly populated for there were chiefs who ruled in this valley. This is proven by the stone walls that are still standing today (March 3, 1922)."
- Excerpt from 'Place Names of Hawaii':

1. Kamana Nui - Moanalua Gardens (S. M. Damon Estate) The Western tributary of Moana-lua Valley, O'ahu. Lit., large Ka-mana

2. Kamana Iki - The eastern and smaller tributary of Moana-lua Valley, O'ahu. Lit., small Ka-mana.

3. Wai-puka - Pools near the mouth of Ka-mana Iki Valley, Moana-lua, O'ahu, where chiefs bathed after games and wrestling. Lit., issuing water.

== Moanalua Gardens ==
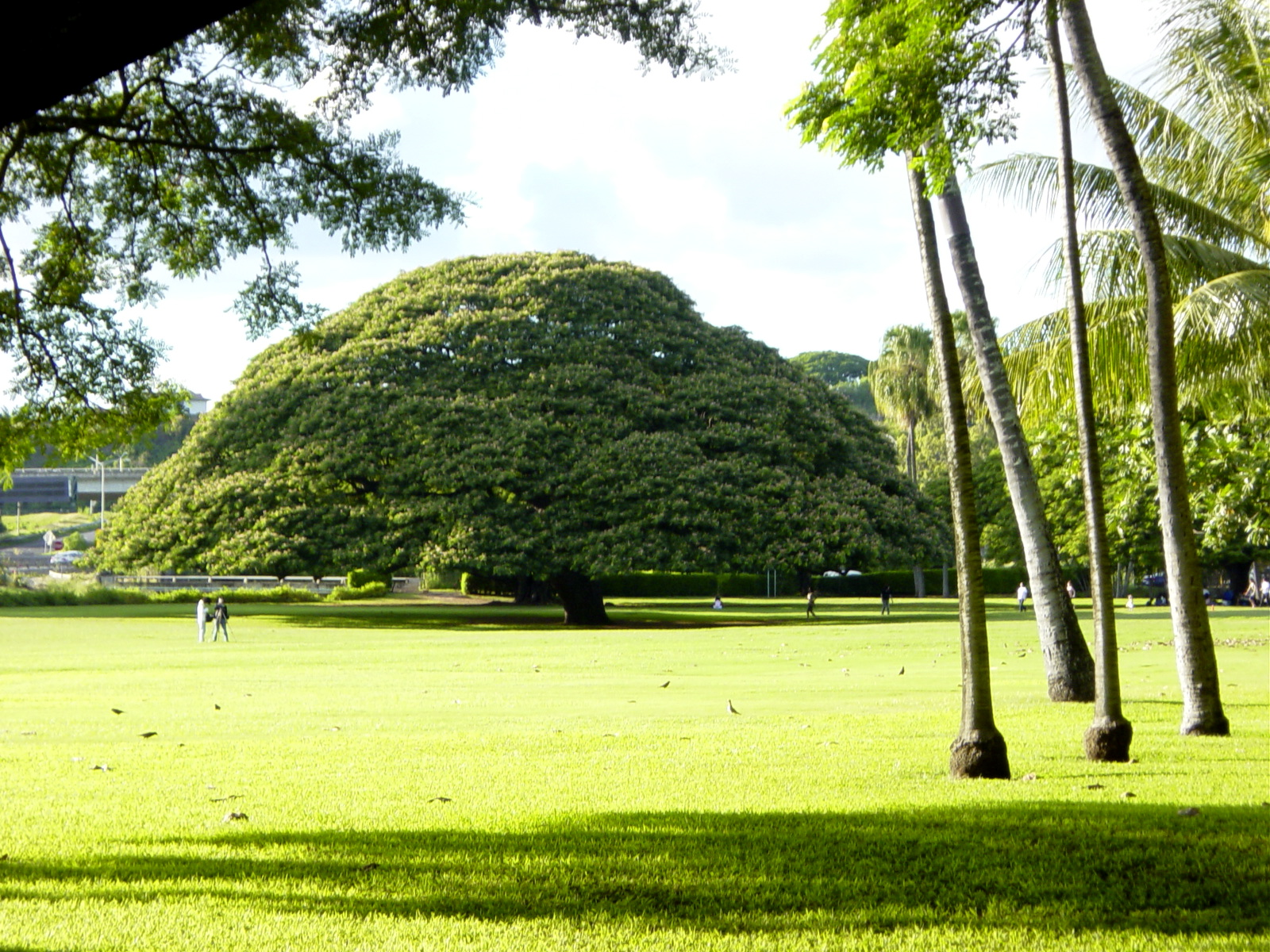
One of many trees at Moanalua Gardens

Moanalua Gardens are inland from the Interstate H-201 which is known as the Moanalua Freeway, off Exit 3. One of its monkey pod trees is seen on Hitachi's Japanese TV commercials, and is occasionally referred to as Hitachi no ki (ja:日立の樹, "Hitachi tree") in Japan.

The gardens were a gift to the public from Damon and maintained by a trust since his death in 1924. It was one of Hawaiʻi's earliest public parks although has remained privately owned.
