= Farrington Highway =

State highway on Oahu, Hawaii, US

- Farrington Highway highlighted in red

Route information
- Component highways: Route 93; Route 930

Location
- Country: United States
- State: Hawaii
- Counties: Oahu

Highway system
- Routes in Hawaii

Farrington Highway is a major highway through the western part of O‘ahu in the U.S. state of Hawaii named after Wallace Rider Farrington, the sixth governor of the Territory of Hawaii, who served from 1921 to 1929. Starting from Kamehameha Highway north of Pearl Harbor, it heads west along the island's southwestern and western coast; another part of the highway also serves the western part of the North Shore, ending in Waialua. With the exception of a gap around Kaena Point (which is a protected area and not accessible by car), the highway forms an almost continuous arc along the coast of the western half of the island of O‘ahu.

The highway consists of the following sections, from north to south:

- Hawaii Route 930, runs east to west along the North Shore, from Waialua to near Kaena Point. It is the major highway through this area.
- A gap around Kaena Point. There is an unpaved path along the route of the old Farrington Highway. However, there is a gate blocking access to cars, and the path is washed out in several places. The highway does not currently run through the Point because it is a state park.
- Hawaii Route 93, runs north to south along the western (leeward) coast, from Kaena Point, through Waianae and Makaha, to the beginning of Interstate H-1 in the southwest of the island. It is the major highway through this area
- Hawaii Route 7110 from Kapolei to Fort Weaver Road. Farrington Highway is largely an undivided two-lane road through this area, providing access to the University of Hawaiʻi at West Oʻahu. Skyline runs parallel to Farrington Highway starting at Kualakaʻi Parkway. Route 7110 terminates at a partially grade-separated interchange with Fort Weaver Road.
- Hawaii Route 7101 is a major divided four-lane commercial thoroughfare through Waipahu. Route 7101 terminates at the Waiawa Interchange with Kamehameha Highway and Interstate H-1.

== History ==
The route that is now Farrington Highway began as a walking route for those who accessed Waianae and Makaha area from central Oahu and the ʻEwa Beach area.

== See also ==
- List of Hawaii state highways
