= Kaʻena Point, Oʻahu =

Westernmost tip of Oʻahu, Hawaii, US

Coordinates: 21°34′31″N 158°16′57″W

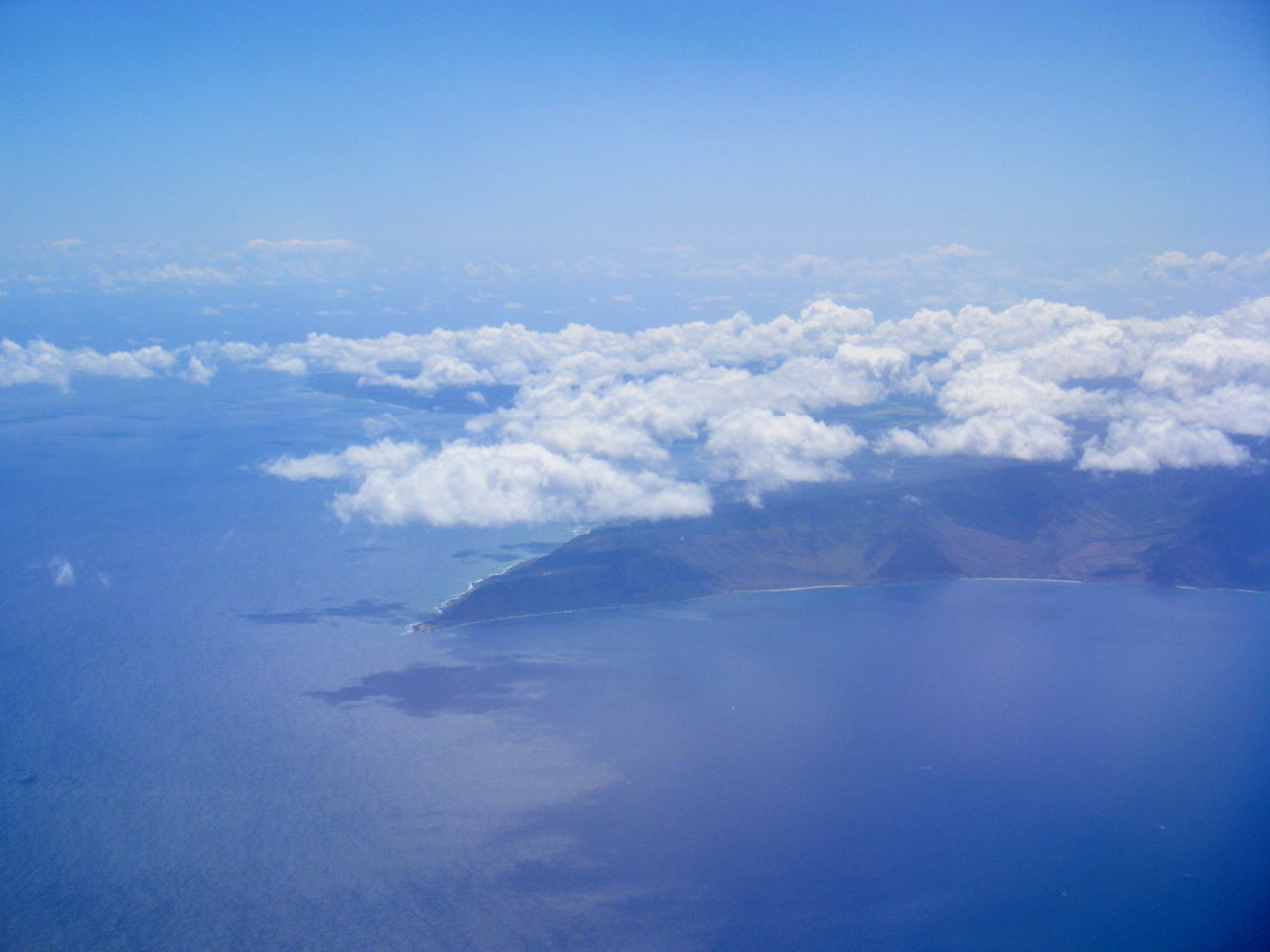
Aerial photo of Kaʻena from the west

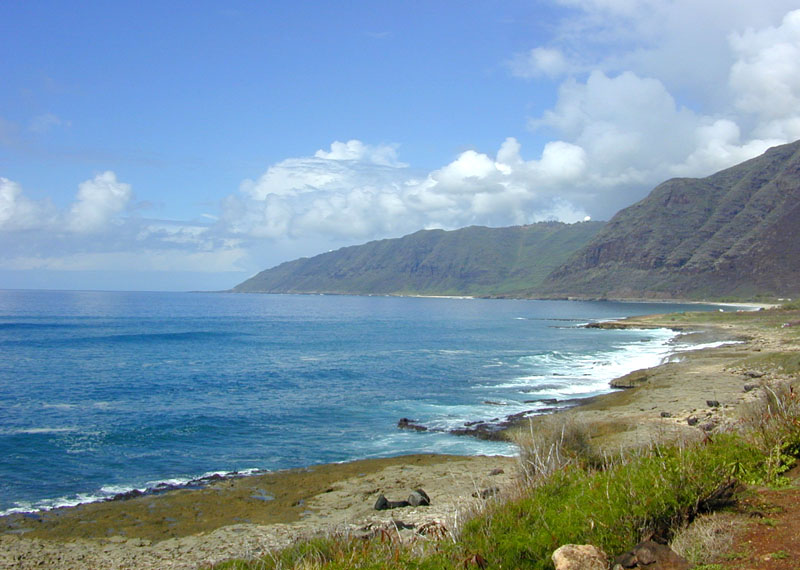
Kaʻena Point as seen from Kāneana on the south shore near Mākua Cave

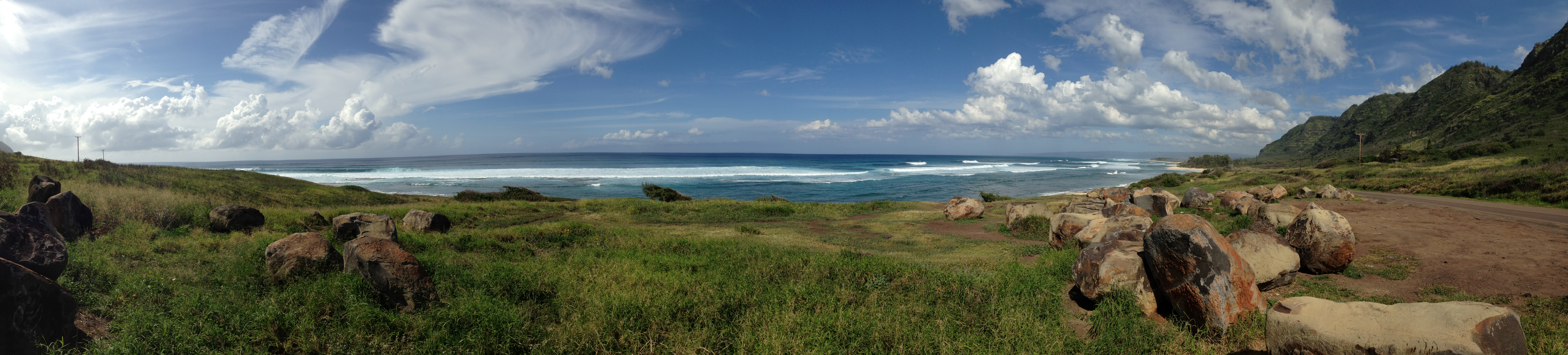
Panorama of the Kaʻena Point Trailhead, as seen from the east side of Oʻahu, past Mokule'ia Beach in 2013

Kaʻena Point is the westernmost tip of the island of Oʻahu. In Hawaiian, kaʻena means "the heat". The area was named after a brother or cousin of Pele. The point is designated as a Natural Area Reserve.

== History ==
According to ancient Hawaiian folklore, Kaʻena Point is the "jumping-off" point for souls leaving this world.

In 1899, the Oahu Railway and Land Company constructed a railway that encompassed 70 miles from Honolulu through Kahuku to transport sugarcane. Most of the tracks were destroyed by a tsunami in 1946. Parts of them are visible along the Ka'ena Point Trail.

== Ecology ==
Ka'ena Point sustains an ecosystem that is home to many native Hawaiian plants and animals.

Plants:

- ‘ohai (Sesbania tomentosa)
- naupaka kahakai (Scaevola sericea)
- ‘ilima papa (Sida falax)
- naio (Myoporum sandwicense)
- pa‘u-o-Hi‘iaka (Jacquemontia ovalifolia)
- ma‘o - Hawaiian cotton (Gossypium tomentosum)
- Ka‘ena ‘akoko (Chamaesyce celastroides var. kaenana)
- hinahina (Heliotropium anomulum)
- pohinahina (Vitex rotundifolia)
- nehe (Lipochaeta integrifolia)
- 'Ahinahina (Achyranthes splendens)

Animals:

- Hawaiian monk seal (Neomonachus schauinslandi)
- Moli (Phoebastria immutabilis)
- Yellow-faced bees (Hylaeus longiceps)

=== Preservation ===
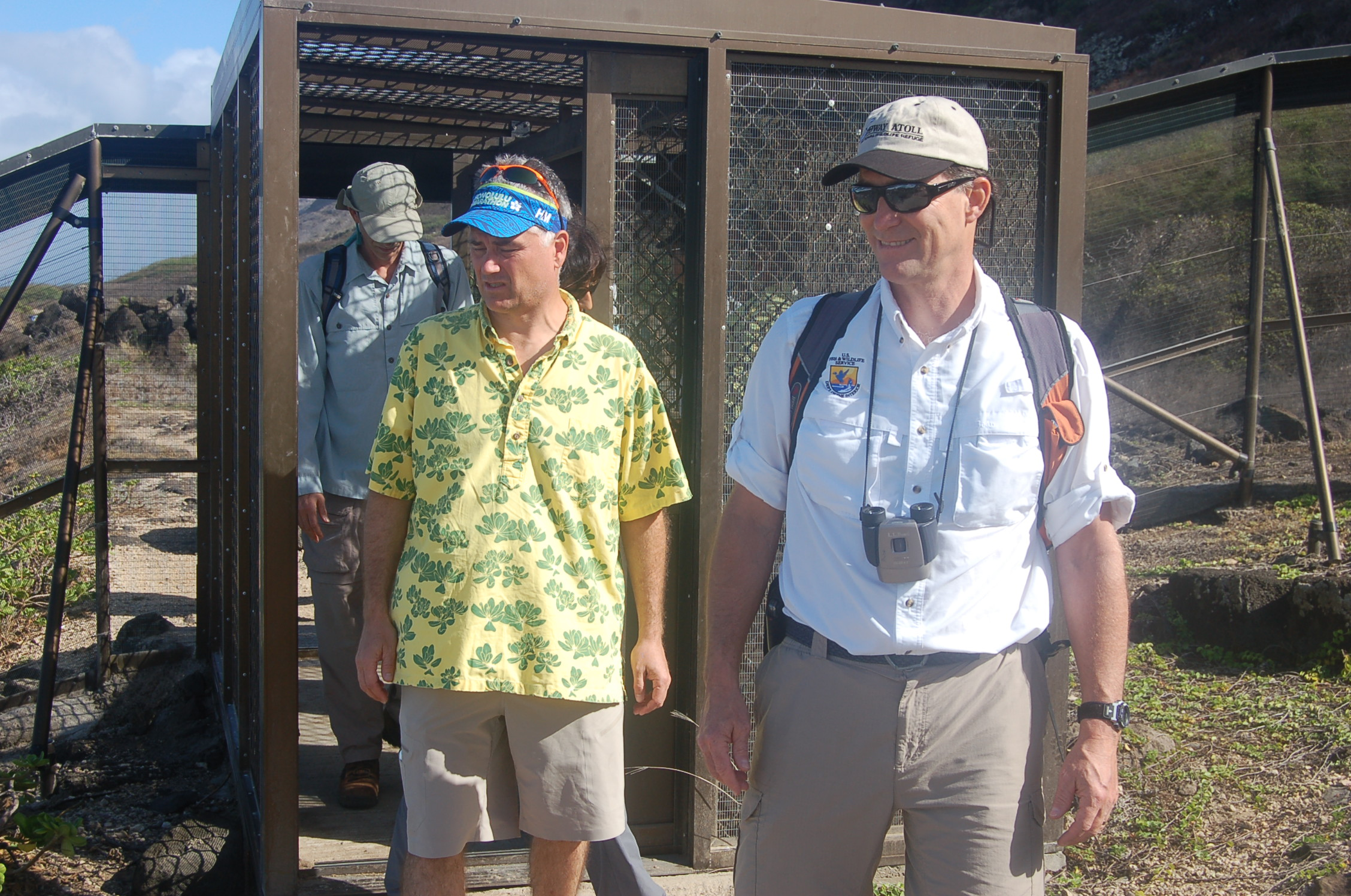
USFWS Director Dan Ashe entering Kaena Point State Park through a mantrap-style gate in the predator-proof fence.

In 2011, the United States' first predator-proof fence was constructed at Ka’ena Point, costing about $290,000. The fence is about 2,133 feet long (650 m), and encompasses 59 acres (24 ha) of land. The population of wedge-tailed shearwater fledglings, Laysan albatross fledglings, ohia, sandalwood trees, and several other species has risen significantly.

== Access ==
Ka'ena Point is a park and hiking site, and is also known for snorkeling. This spot has a white sandy beach that runs from Oahu's western tip to the Waiʻanae Range. A 5-mile trail (8.0 km) can be entered from Keawaula Beach or Mokuleia.

Until January 28, 1998, when professional surfer Ken Bradshaw was photographed riding a wave with a reported 85-foot (26 m) face, it was believed that Greg Noll's 1969 photo had shown the largest wave ever photographed. During that famous swell in January 1998, several people reported seeing waves with 60–80-foot (18–24 m) faces at Kaʻena Point.
