= Kapolei, Hawaii =

Census-designated place in Hawaii, United States

Kapolei
- Census-designated place
- Kapolei
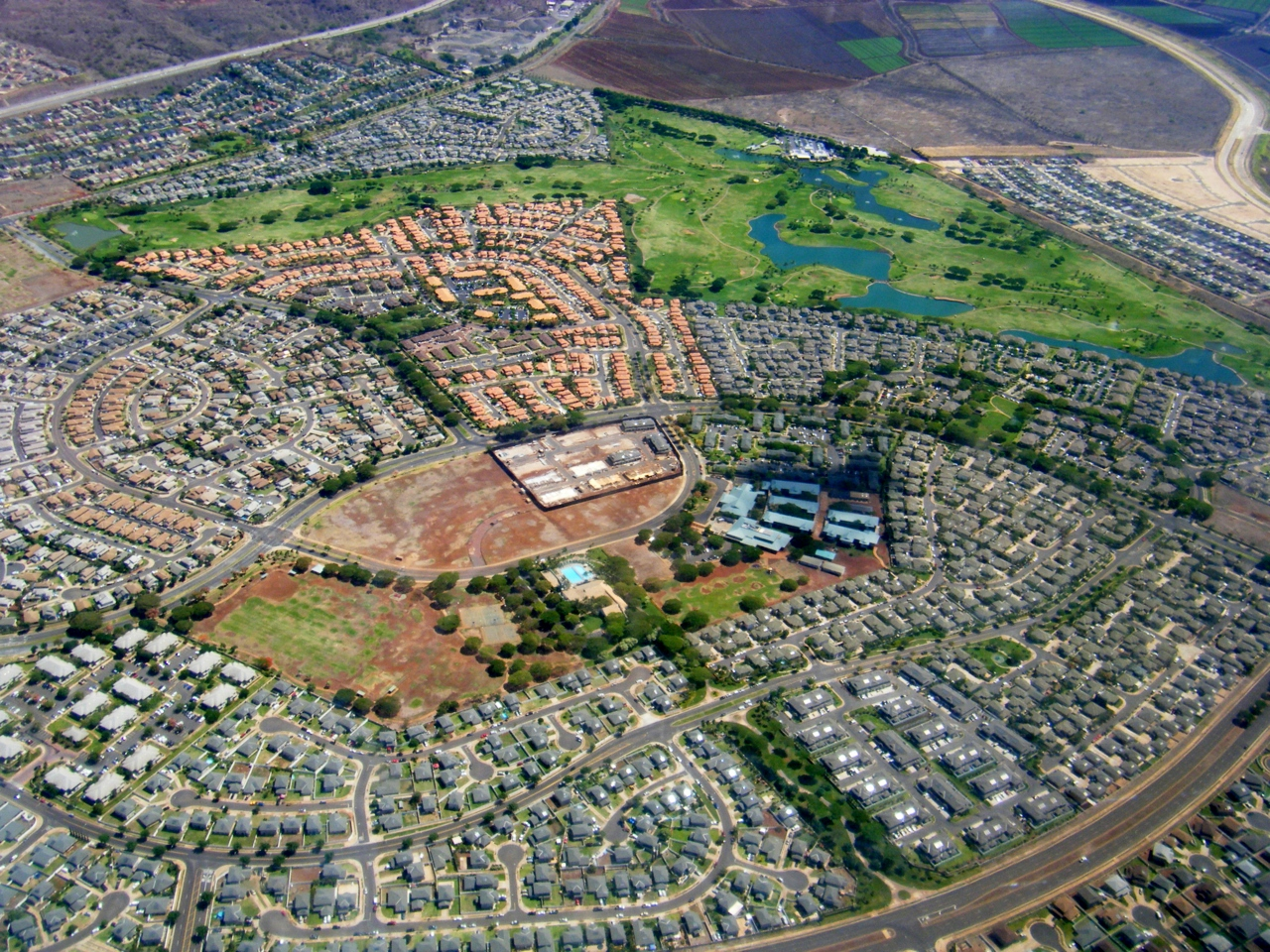
- Aerial photo of Kapolei neighborhood
- Nicknames: The Second City of Oʻahu, Hawaiʻi's e-City
- Location within the state of Hawaiʻi Kapolei (Hawaii)
- Coordinates: 21°20′05″N 158°04′51″W
- Country: United States
- State: Hawaiʻi
- County: Honolulu

Area
  - Total: 4.37 sq mi (11.32 km^{2})
  - Land: 4.37 sq mi (11.32 km^{2})
  - Water: 0 sq mi (0.00 km^{2})
- Elevation: 51 ft (16 m)

Population (2020)
  - Total: 21,411
  - Density: 4,900/sq mi (1,892/km^{2})
- Time zone: UTC−10 (Hawaii–Aleutian)
- ZIP code: 96707
- Area code: 808
- FIPS code: 15-30300

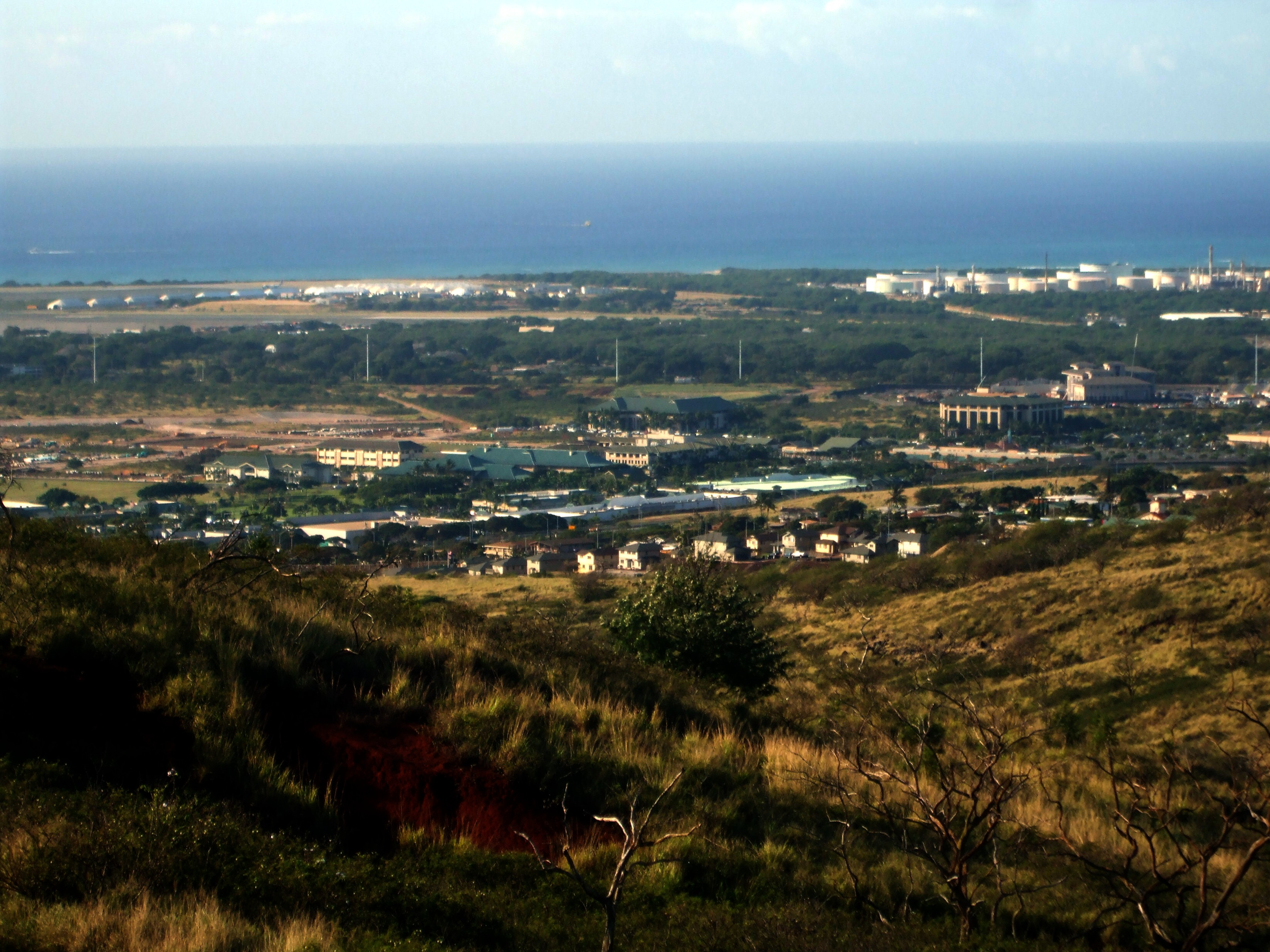
Kapolei City Center under development, taken from Makakilo Heights

Kapolei (Hawaiian pronunciation: [kəpoˈlej]) is a planned community in the City and County of Honolulu, Hawaii, United States, on the island of Oahu. In 1977, the government designated it as the "second city" of Oʻahu, in relation to Honolulu. For statistical purposes, the United States Census Bureau has defined Kapolei as a census-designated place (CDP) within the consolidated city-county of Honolulu. As of the 2020 census, Kapolei had a population of 21,411.

The community takes its name from a volcanic cone, Puʻu o Kapolei. In the Hawaiian language, puʻu means "hill" and Kapo lei means "beloved Kapo". According to legend, Kapo, Goddess of Fertility was sister to Pele, Goddess of Fire and Nāmaka, Goddess of the Sea.

Much of the land is part of the estate of industrialist James Campbell. Kapolei's major developer is Kapolei Property Development, a subsidiary of James Campbell Company. Kapolei sits primarily upon former sugarcane and pineapple fields.

== Demographics ==
Historical population
Census	Pop.	Note	%±
2010	15,186		—
2020	21,411		41.0%
U.S. Decennial Census

=== 2020 census ===
As of the 2020 census, Kapolei had a population of 21,411 and a population density of 4,900.7 inhabitants per square mile. The median age was 34.3 years. 26.1% of residents were under the age of 18 and 10.7% of residents were 65 years of age or older. For every 100 females there were 98.9 males, and for every 100 females age 18 and over there were 96.3 males age 18 and over.

100.0% of residents lived in urban areas, while 0.0% lived in rural areas.

There were 6,376 households in Kapolei, of which 44.3% had children under the age of 18 living in them. Of all households, 61.6% were married-couple households, 12.5% were households with a male householder and no spouse or partner present, and 19.2% were households with a female householder and no spouse or partner present. About 13.7% of all households were made up of individuals and 4.3% had someone living alone who was 65 years of age or older.

There were 6,583 housing units, of which 3.1% were vacant. The homeowner vacancy rate was 0.6% and the rental vacancy rate was 5.4%.

Racial composition as of the 2020 census
Race	Number	Percent
White	2,358	11.0%
Black or African American	560	2.6%
American Indian and Alaska Native	40	0.2%
Asian	7,432	34.7%
Native Hawaiian and Other Pacific Islander	3,052	14.3%
Some other race	346	1.6%
Two or more races	7,623	35.6%
Hispanic or Latino (of any race)	2,675	12.5%

=== Ancestry ===
The ancestry was 6.8% German, 4.1% Irish, 2.1% English, 2.0% Portuguese, 1.4% Italian, 1.3% French, 1.3% Sub-Saharan African, 1.0% Polish, 0.5% Norwegian, 0.4% West Indian, and 0.3% Scottish.

=== Income ===
The median household income was $116,128, with families having $121,606, married couples having $128,844, and non-families having $73,524. A total of 6.1% of the population were in poverty, with 8.9% of those under 18, 4.8% between the ages of 18 and 64, and 5.6% of people 65 or older being in poverty. The per capita income was $41,203.

== History ==
In 1955 the Kapolei master plan was drafted and revised 3 different times beginning in 1974. In 1977 the new General Provision Plan adopted the Oʻahu General Plan which dubbed Kapolei "second urban center" (SUC) on the island of Oʻahu. In 1986 the ʻEwa Master Plan was revised to include the SUC and the initial residential construction in the Kapolei area began in the late 1980s with commercial developments springing up shortly thereafter. Nearly two decades later, in 2006 the Kapolei area had more than 800 companies, agencies, and organizations making up approximately 25,000 jobs. As of the 2010 census, the Kapolei CDP had a population of 15,186 people.

The original development objectives for the City of Kapolei were to include: an employment center, a new center for offices and businesses, a center for government offices, a city of people walking, biking, or bussing, the latest energy-efficient technologies such as water conservation and recycling, and the most efficient connectivity for commuting on Oʻahu. In essence a "smart city". The design plan for development ensures that the 7 themes of Kapolei remain the same throughout its construction. These include 1. Hawaiian Garden City 2. Healthy Living 3. Complete Community Services 4. Pedestrian-friendly 5. Past/Present/Future design architecture 6. Sustainability 7. Technology.

Kapolei is quickly becoming the second urban center of Oʻahu, Hawaiʻi's most densely populated island. Much of Oʻahu's future population growth is projected for the Kapolei area, ʻEwa Plain, and southern slopes of the island's central valley, between Waipahu near Pearl Harbor and Wahiawā near the island's center.

The U.S. postal code for Kapolei is 96707. In 2002, Pacific Business News reported that 96707 had the second highest median income on the island of Oʻahu, at $62,303. Sperlings's Best Places reports Kapolei's median income of $70,129, compared to the national average of $42,350. Nearly one household in five has income exceeding $100,000, with a home ownership rate of 70%.

== Communities ==
Other communities in the Kapolei area are the census-designated places of Makakilo and Naval Air Station Barbers Point (now known as Kalaeloa), the industrial area known as Campbell Industrial Park with the state's second largest deepwater port, Barbers Point Harbor, and the resort and marina community of Ko Olina, which includes the Disney Aulani Resort and Ko Olina Golf Club.

== Transportation ==
Ongoing road construction has not resolved continuing traffic problems. A Manawai Street-Kama‘aha Avenue extension was completed in August 2006 and helped to reduce congestion along Kamokila Boulevard and Farrington Highway. Kapolei Property Development began construction in January 2007 on a $2 million road to extend Kamokila Boulevard from Kapolei Parkway to Roosevelt Avenue. Kapolei Property Development recently contributed $6 million for a joint project with the State Department of Transportation for an additional freeway on-ramp.

Although state and county governments and some of Hawaiʻi's largest companies have significant workplaces in Kapolei, population growth has far out-paced local job creation. A majority of Kapolei adults work in Honolulu, congesting the main traffic artery, Interstate H-1. In December 2006, the Honolulu City Council approved the Honolulu Rail Transit Project (now known as Skyline), a fixed-guideway elevated rail system connecting Kapolei to Downtown Honolulu. In January 2007, Oʻahu residents saw an increase of 0.5 percent to the general excise tax to help cover the system's construction costs. The project broke ground in East Kapolei on February 22, 2011. Work on the foundations for the concrete pillars began shortly after in Waipahu; work to install the pillars started in East Kapolei in April 2012, and the first phase of the project started service to Aloha Stadium on June 30, 2023.

=== Main roads ===
Kapolei is located at the southern end of the slopes of the Waiʻanae mountain near the neighborhood of Makakilo with Fort Barrette Road, located along and named for historically important Fort Barrette, connecting Makakilo to Kapolei. It is located on the ʻEwa Plain approximately 25 miles (40 km) from Honolulu. The Interstate H-1 freeway divides more recently developed Kapolei from Makakilo, and traveling eastward on H-1 connects to Waipahu. In the other direction, the freeway ends about 1 mile (1.6 km) west of Kapolei, merging into Farrington Highway (State Route 93) to Kahe and then to Nānākuli on the Wai‘anae Coast. Traveling eastward on Farrington Highway connects to Honouliuli. Exit 1 on H-1 is Kalaeloa Boulevard, the entrance to Barbers Point and Campbell Industrial Park. Less than 1 mile beyond (west of) the merge of H-1 and Farrington Highway is an off-ramp and overcrossing to the West Oʻahu resort area of Ko Olina.

To the south, Renton Road connects Kapolei to Kalaeloa and, further east, to ʻEwa Villages.

== Economy ==
Ka Makana Ali‘i, a mall that opened in October 2016, has 1.4 million square feet of retail space and more than a hundred stores. Macy's, a department store chain, is an anchor for the mall.

== Climate ==
- Highest temperature recorded 96 °F (36 °C) in August 2016
- Lowest temperature recorded 49 °F (9 °C) in March 2005
- Average high temperature in July, 88 °F (31 °C)
- Average low temperature in July, 69 °F (21 °C)
- Average high temperature in December, 80 °F (27 °C)
- Average low temperature in December, 60 °F (16 °C)
- Average rainfall in July, 0 inches (0 mm)
- Average rainfall in December, 3.1 inches (79 mm)

== Government and infrastructure ==
Kapolei is officially governed by the government of Honolulu County. The county government covers the entire island of Oʻahu, with the county seat being at Honolulu Hale in Honolulu. The governmental body includes the Mayor of Honolulu County, the Honolulu City and County Council, and state representatives.

Kapolei Hale, built in 2001, serves as the civic center and main municipal building of the City of Kapolei. The building contains an office for the Mayor, as well as offices of various city and county government agencies and is the headquarters for the City and County of Honolulu Department of Parks and Recreation. However, the Permits Office for the Department of Parks and Recreation is located downtown Honolulu at the Frank F. Fasi Civic Center in the Frank F. Fasi Municipal Building at 650 South King Street.

Additionally, federal, several state, and county department offices have been relocated to the Kapolei area. In 2010 the Hawaiʻi State Judiciary Court relocated family court matters from cramped offices in downtown Honolulu to a newly constructed, technologically advanced building in Kapolei.

The Honolulu Police Department operates the Kapolei Regional Police Station for district 8 at 1100 Kamokila Boulevard.

The Federal Bureau of Investigation (FBI) Honolulu field office is in Kapolei at 91-1300 Enterprise Street. Opened in 2013, it is the first federal agency to be headquartered in Kapolei. This Honolulu field office has jurisdiction over Hawaiʻi, Guam, Saipan, and American Samoa with resident agencies in Maui, Kona, Guam, and Saipan. The previous site in downtown Honolulu was too small.

A coal power plant operated until 2022. A 585 MWh lithium iron phosphate battery opened in 2024.

== Education ==
The Hawaiʻi Department of Education operates public schools in Hawaiʻi, including Kapolei. Public elementary schools in the Kapolei CDP include Kapolei Elementary School and Hoʻokele Elementary School, with one public middle school, Kapolei Middle School, and one public high school, Kapolei High School.

Island Pacific Academy (pre-K through 12) in Kapolei CDP, which opened as a private school in 2004, is an International Baccalaureate (IB) school offering IB classes to all grades. American Renaissance Academy (pre-K through 12) opened as a private school in 2007 in Kalaeloa, Naval Air Station Barbers Point.

Barbers Point Elementary School is in Kalaeloa CDP (formerly Barbers Point Housing CDP) but has a Kapolei address. Makakilo Elementary School and Mauka Lani Elementary School are in Makakilo CDP but have Kapolei addresses.

The University of Hawaiʻi at West Oʻahu relocated to Kapolei and opened its new campus in August 2012 at 91-1001 Farrington Highway. Hawaii Tokai International College relocated to Kapolei in April 2015. Wayland Baptist University is also located in Kapolei.

== Notable people ==
- Laila Ireland, LGBTQ rights activist and U.S. Army corporal
