= Hawaii Route 540 =

State highway in Hawaii, United States

Hawaii Route 540
- Halewili Road

Route information
- Maintained by HDOT
- Length: 3.9 mi (6.3 km)

Major junctions
- West end: Route 50 in Kalaheo
- East end: Route 50 in Eleele

Location
- Country: United States
- State: Hawaii
- Counties: Kauaʻi

Highway system
- Routes in Hawaii
← Route 480	→ Route 541

Route 540 (Halewili Road) is a 3.9-mile-long (6.3 km) state highway that stretches from Route 50 in Eleele back to Route 50 in Kalaheo on the island of Kauaʻi.

== Route description ==
The road is mainly an alternative to Route 50 and for the first one mile (1.6 km), the Pacific Ocean is in view as the highway travels easterly. Route 540 then takes a sharp turn north at the Kauaʻi Coffee plant, towards Kalaheo. Numerous agriculture fields surround the road.

== Major junctions ==
The entire route is in Kauaʻi County.

Location	mi	km	Destinations	Notes
ʻEleʻele	0.0	0.0	Route 50 (Kaumualiʻi Highway) – Port Allen, Waimea, Līhuʻe	Western terminus
Kalāheo	3.9	6.3	Route 50 (Kaumualiʻi Highway) – Waimea, Kalaheo, Līhuʻe	Eastern terminus
1.000 mi = 1.609 km; 1.000 km = 0.621 mi
