= Hele-On Bus =

Public transit service on Hawaii Island, Hawaii

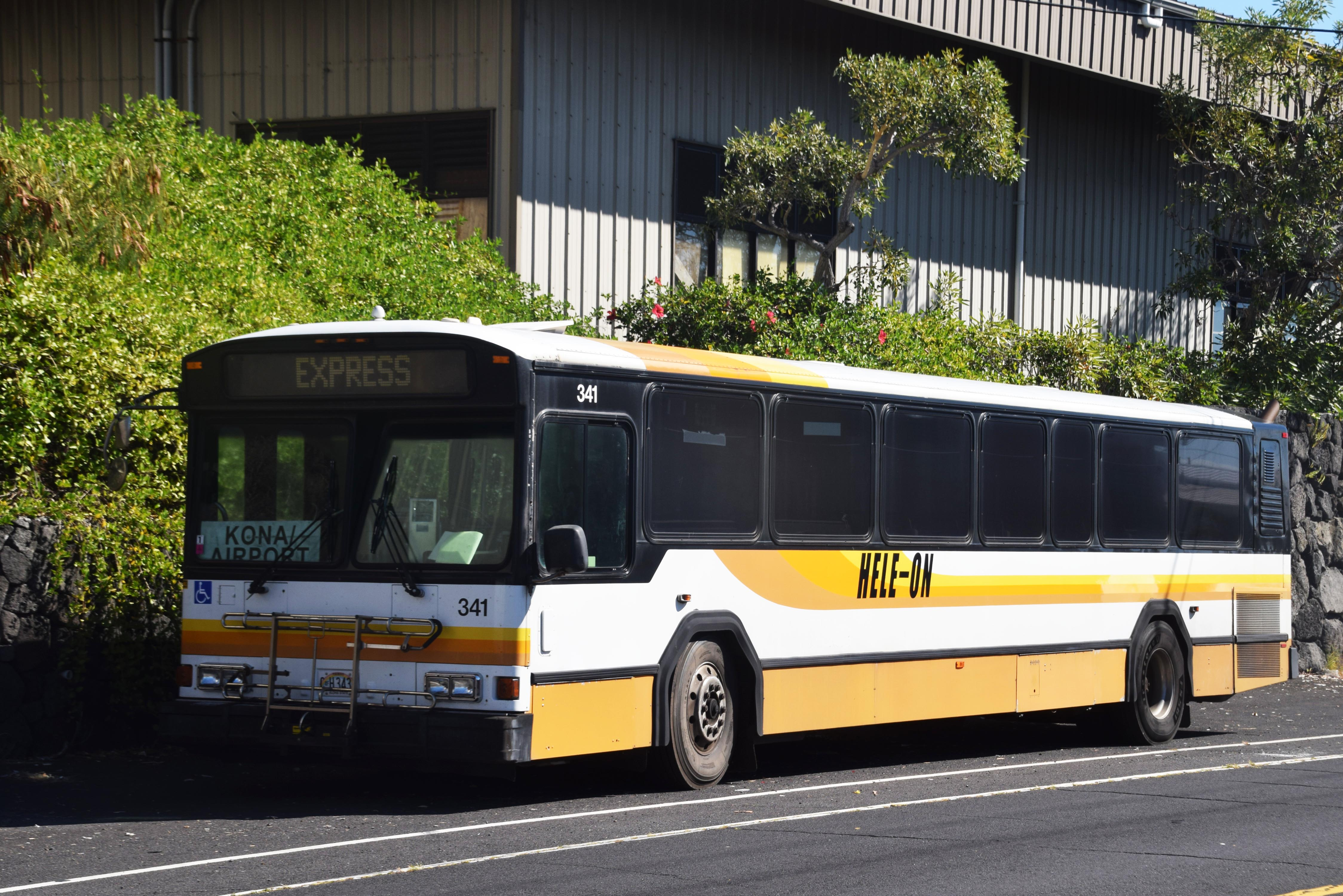
- Gillig Phantom Hele-On Bus #341 (formerly operated by TheBus) on the Big Island, Hawaiʻi
- Parent: Hawaiʻi County
- Founded: November 29, 1973
- Headquarters: Hilo, Hawaiʻi
- Service area: Hawaiʻi County, Hawaiʻi
- Service type: bus service, paratransit
- Routes: 12
- Hubs: Hilo
- Fleet: 55
- Fuel type: Diesel, Gasoline, Electric, Hydrogen
- Operator: Roberts Hawaii
- Chief executive: Victor Kandle (Mass Transit Administrator)
- Website: Official website

Hele-On Bus is the public transport bus service provided by the County of Hawaiʻi on the Big Island of Hawaiʻi, within the state of Hawaiʻi, United States. It serves a limited number of routes on limited frequency.

== History ==
Prior to 1976, public transport in the Hilo area was provided by "sampan" buses converted locally from conventional passenger automobiles and operated as taxi or jitney services. The first "sampan" was credited to Hilo taxi driver Fukumatsu Kusumoto, who converted a Ford in 1922 by expanding the passenger compartment and installing wooden benches. Most sampans retained the passenger compartment from the back of the driver's seat forward; the remainder of the body was cut away and replaced with a homebuilt open-sided bed with a canvas roof, accommodating approximately twelve passengers on longitudinal benches. In Hawaiian, sampan buses are called kaa huli aku huli mai, the 'face one another' bus, after the bench seating arrangements. A 1971 article promoting tourism to the island called them "as anachronistic and beloved as San Francisco's cable cars."

In the late 1930s, sampan bus fares dropped from 15 cents to 5 cents as competition increased. The Board of Supervisors of the County of Hawaiʻi created the Bus Control Committee in 1948 to regulate the sampan bus industry, and required all licensed operators to use the terminal in Moʻoheau Park starting in 1949. A law was passed in 1962 to exempt sampan buses from the vehicle safety laws introduced by the 1961 Motor Carriers Act; the sampan bus exemption remained until 2014, limited to a radius of 20 miles (32 km) centered on Hilo, when it was removed via HB2351/SB2901. At one point, there were more than 80 sampan buses in Hilo, but only 9 were left by 1972. The Lyman House Memorial Museum offered tours of Hilo starting in 1988, aboard a restored vintage 1948 Plymouth 13-passenger sampan bus, but it was sold to Hamakua Springs Country Farms proprietor Richard Ha in the early 2000s.

=== Origins ===
In 1968, the County Economic Development Department began considering whether to subsidize or assume control of the aging sampan fleet, concluding it would cost an estimated $95–100,000/year to operate five routes. At that point, the average sampan bus was 20 years old, operated by drivers averaging 58 years old earning a net income of only $1 to $1.25 per hour after expenses. Hawaiʻi County Councilman James Souza sponsored a bill to create a County transportation agency in 1971, and the County was awarded a $31,616 federal grant that June to begin studying the area's transportation needs. The Hawaii County Transit System report was published in May 1972 and submitted to the County Council in September of that year.

The county transportation system was officially launched on November 29, 1973 with a bus that ran from Waiohinu to Hilo, after being championed by Hawaiʻi County Councilman (and eventual County Mayor) Dante Carpenter. The new service was named "Hele On" after a Pidgin Hawaiian phrase meaning "to get out of here" or "to move along". Olan Carpenter, wife of Dante, came up with the name. The service's first logo was a blue circle with a tire track in the center and two bare, yellow feet on either side of the track, devised by Colleen Shimazu. In 1975, the Mass Transit Agency (MTA) bought out and shut down the sampan system, then began providing public transportation services for the County of Hawaiʻi as the Hele-On Bus system. The County Council decided to solicit bids to operate the service as a performance-based contract, provided as a cost per bus-hour, in September 1975. The operation contract was initially awarded to Laupahoehoe Transportation Company.

The first bus ran on December 15, 1975 on a 36-mile (58 km) roundtrip route within Hilo, serving Keaukaha (Kalanaia - Kalanianaole - Kaumana). Uniquely, there were no scheduled stops: passengers made stop requests or flagged down the bus while it was enroute, and the driver was free to choose a safe place to stop. At some of the tight intersections in the city, the bus was unable to negotiate some turns without having all other vehicles cleared, and that first trip took 2 hours and 40 minutes to complete. Fares for urban routes (within Hilo and Kona) were US$0.25 (equivalent to $1.5 in 2025). In May 1976, Hele-On began testing bus service west from Hilo to Kona and back via Waimea, Hāpuna Beach, Puako, ʻAnaehoʻomalu Bay, and Kailua; the service at that time included a single trip that ran east from Kona to Hilo and back. Round trip fare was US$4 (equivalent to $22.63 in 2025). Fares for rural routes (crossing the island) were typically higher; for example, the Kona→Hilo fare was US$2.25 (equivalent to $13.46 in 2025). By 1977, Hele-On was recognized as a bargain for both locals and tourists. However, the farebox recovery ratio for only two routes was greater than 50%, with the systemwide ratio at 32.9%.

=== Fare hikes ===
The first proposed fare hike in 1981 would have increased urban fares by 30 cents and rural fares by 15 to 50 cents; using the original fares established in 1975, the farebox recovery ratio had declined to 19% systemwide, and the County Council approved an increase that would double fares systemwide (for both urban and rural routes) in April 1982. Due to annual operating deficits of nearly $1 million, a proposal was advanced in 1985 to reduce service significantly, which was opposed by many. As a compromise, MTA proposed less-severe cuts in service and additional fare hikes, which was approved by the County Council. In 1986, the County Council voted to award the operating contract to PHT, Inc.

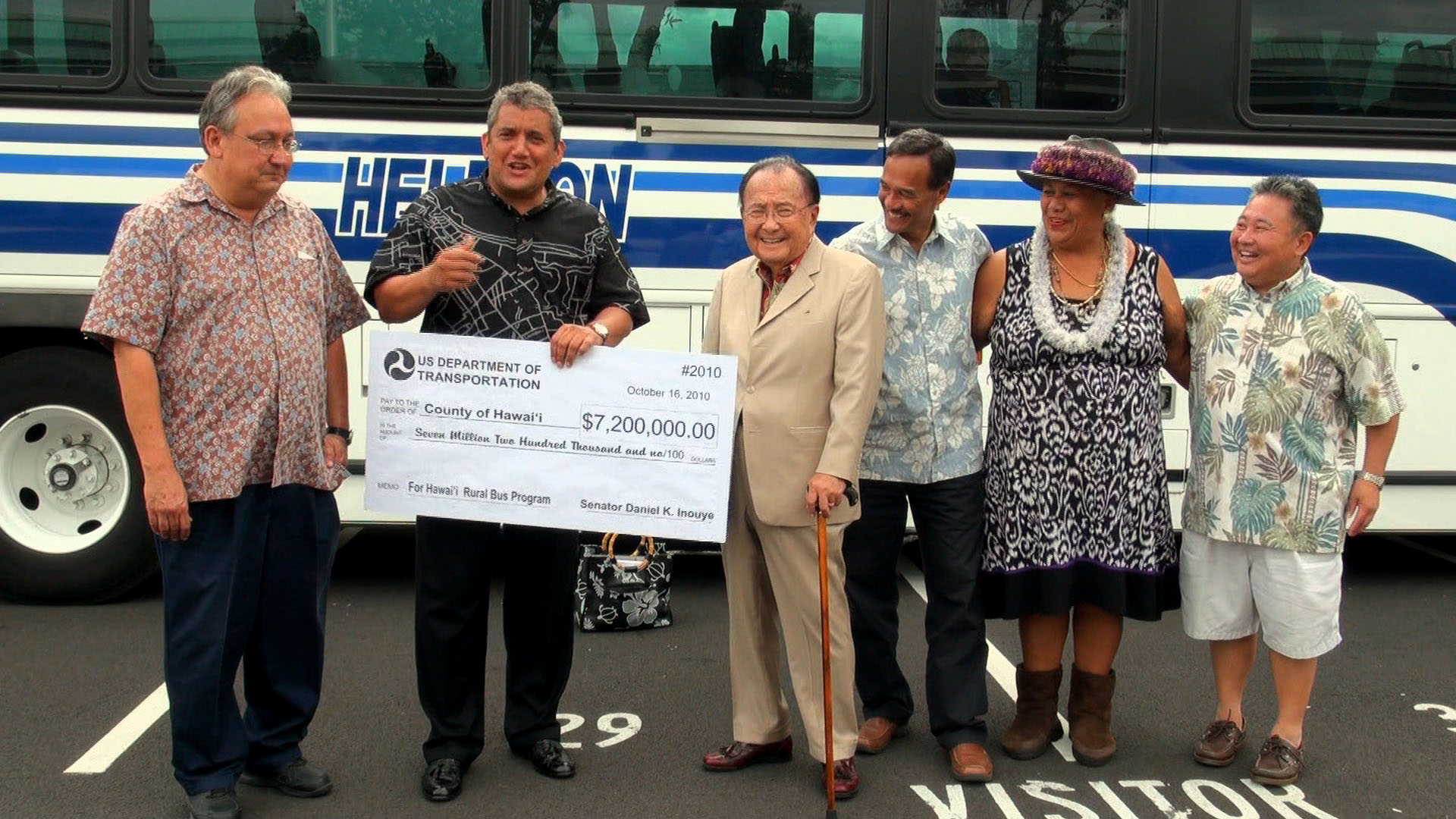
Sen. Daniel Inouye presents a novelty check to Mayor Billy Kenoi in October 2010 representing $7.2M in federal grants.

Fares for the Hele-On Bus were waived in 2009 in response to the 2008 economic downturn and ridership rose to more than 1 million passenger trips in one year. In October 2010, Senator Daniel Inouye presented a check for $7.2 million to County Mayor Billy Kenoi and MTA Director Tom Brown, representing the award of two grants from the Federal Transit Administration. The grants would be used for purchasing new buses ($3.2 million) and building a new baseyard ($4 million) for MTA administration, bus operations, and maintenance. At the time, it was the largest transit grant ever awarded in the state.

=== Crisis ===
However, from 2014 to 2018, MTA failed to file any new federal grant applications, which would have provided funds to purchase buses at no cost to the county. By 2017, nearly half of the county-owned Hele-On Bus fleet (25 of 55 buses) was laid up requiring major repairs, leading to canceled service and a request to have buses donated from Honolulu. Seven Gillig Phantom buses, originally built in 1997, arrived from Honolulu in July 2017. When county-owned buses were unavailable, MTA were forced to substitute privately owned rental buses, school buses, or vans. In 2018, MTA began public meetings to discuss and finalize the Transit Master Plan then under preparation. The plan's lead author, Cheryl Soon, minced no words regarding the system's status: "Your transit system is in dire straits. … It is not in a good place. Your buses are broken down. … You're hanging by a thread," adding that short-term substitute bus rentals were "wasting money every day" and could only be solved by purchasing buses.

In late 2019, only 10 or 12 county-owned buses were still operable, leading to a "meltdown" of cancellations, delays, and riders turned away from over-capacity buses in January 2020. The unavailability of county-owned buses could not be completely solved with short-term rentals from private bus operators, as the rented buses often did not provide ADA-compliant access.

Roberts Hawaii took over the operating contract from Polynesian Adventure Tours in 2020. Roberts had been awarded the contract on October 10, 2019, following the expiration of the previous contract on June 30, 2018, but a bid protest and irregularities in one of the RFP documents meant that a new round of bids was required. Under the prior contract with Polynesian Adventures, the contractor provided bus drivers for county-owned buses, and was paid to fill-in service using short-term bus rentals and drivers if the county was unable to supply enough buses. Because of its inadequate fleet availability, in Fiscal Year 2018, the County of Hawaiʻi paid $6.58 million to rent fill-in buses and drivers, compared to spending just $2.86 million on drivers for county-owned buses.

The U.S. Department of Justice investigated MTA for violations of the Americans with Disabilities Act (ADA) and negotiated a settlement agreement released on August 24, 2021, in lieu of pursuing litigation against MTA. Under the settlement terms, MTA will repair "chronically inoperable" wheelchair lifts on its vehicles, and implement new training for personnel regarding their ADA obligations when serving disabled customers.

=== Hub-and-spoke ===
Hele-On Bus is planning to modify its routes, shifting to a hub-and-spoke system that will have three "full" transport hubs in major cities (Hilo/Moʻoheau Bus Terminal, Kailua–Kona, Pāhoa) and multiple "satellite" hubs in smaller locations (Hilo/Prince Kūhiō Plaza, Honokaʻa, Keaʻau, Ocean View, and Waimea) by 2025; large long-haul buses will take passengers between hubs, and smaller buses will be used for multiple circulator routes within each community, connecting various destinations at their respective hubs. In March 2021, MTA announced that development was proceeding for four locations (Hilo, Kona, Pāhoa, and Waimea) and comments were being solicited on a list of 11 potential Kona hub sites.

== Operations ==
=== Routes ===
Hele-On Bus serves multiple fixed routes, including Hilo-Kailua Kona (Hilo - Honokaa - Waimea, Kailua Kona, on Hawaii Route 190), Intra-Hilo routes, Intra-Kona routes (Kona - Captain Cook - Kailua Kona - Kona International Airport) and others. The routes can be broadly divided into one of three categories: Connector (providing service between communities), Circulator (providing service within a community), and Commuter (providing service from residential districts to employment centers with limited stops and scheduled departures).

Most of the Connector and Commuter routes follow the Hawaiʻi Belt Road, comprising Hawaii Routes 11, 19, and 190 and running along the perimeter of the island. The routes serving the North Kohala region run along ʻAkoni Pule Highway (Hawaii Route 270), connecting with the Belt Road at Kawaihae.

The Transit Master Plan called for three new express routes: the Blue Line (which would run between Hilo and Kailua-Kona along Saddle Road (Hawaii Route 200) and Routes 19/190), the Green Line (between Honokaʻa and Kailua-Kona along Routes 19/190), and the Red Line (Hilo and Volcano along Route 11, complementing the existing line #10 Hilo – Volcano – Kaʻū). The express routes would offer limited stop service to cut the trip time.

Hele-On Bus routes
No. (Note: Route numbers are based on the 2018 Master Plan report.)	Name	Region	Service Hours	Trips (Note: Abbreviations used: OW: one-way trips; RT: round trips; ## min: headway between departures)
Connector Routes (Note: These routes connect different communities to provide commuting services.)
1	Hilo-Kailua Kona	East	3:35 AM – 1:10 PM / 6:15 AM – 4:00 PM	3 OW
2	Blue Line Express, Hilo-Kona	East		2 RT
10	Hilo-Volcano-Kaʻū	East	5:00 AM – 4:40 PM (Note: One trip in each direction starts/ends at Oceanview Park & Ride, past the normal terminus at Hawaiʻi Volcanoes National Park.)	5 RT
11	Red Line Express, Hilo-Volcano	East		2 RT
40	Hilo-Pahoa	East	5:15 AM – 8:40 PM (Note: Earliest trip in each direction is short-turned in Hilo, starting/ending at Prince Kuhio Plaza.)	11 RT
60	Hilo-Honokaʻa	East	3:15 AM – 7:15 PM	6-12 RT (Note: Depending on the day of the week: 12 weekday round trips, 10 on Saturday, and 6 on Sunday.)
80	Hilo-South Kohala Resorts	East	3:15 AM – 7:15 PM	9 RT
90	Pahala-Kailua Kona-South Kohala Resorts	West	3:30 AM – 8:00 AM	3 RT
Circulator Routes (Note: These routes operate within a single community.)
101	Intra-Hilo Keaukaha	East	7:00 AM – 5:40 PM	9 RT; 80 min
102	Intra-Hilo Kaumana	East	7:15 AM – 4:20 PM	6 RT
103	Intra-Hilo Waiakea Uka	East	7:05 AM – 3:20 PM	5 RT
104	Intra-Hilo Mohouli	East		6 RT
201	Kona Trolly	West	6:30 AM – 5:30 PM	6 RT
202	Intra-Kona Airport via Ane Keohokalole	West		9 RT
203	Intra-Kona Airport via Hwy 190	West		9 RT
204	Intra-Kona Kuakini Hwy	West		9 RT
301	Waimea Shuttle	North	6:30 AM – 4:30 PM	11 RT; 60 min
401	HI Beaches-Nanawale-Seaview	East		10 RT
402	Paradise-Ainaloa-Orchidland	East		4 RT
403	Fern Forest	East		2 RT
Commuter Routes (Note: These routes operate with limited stops and departures during peak commuting hours.)
75	North Kohala-Waimea-Kailua Kona	West	6:45 AM, 1:35 PM (Note: Operates modified schedule on Saturdays.)	1 RT
76	Green Line Express, Honokaʻa-Waimea-Kona	East		2 RT
Proposed Routes (Note: These routes are proposed in Chapter 4 of the 2018 County of Hawaiʻi Transit and Multi-Modal Transportation Master Plan.)

=== Paratransit ===
Hele-On Bus started the Kakoʻo paratransit service on July 1, 2016, as part of a settlement for a lawsuit filed by a rider who could not be accommodated on a Hele-On fixed route bus. Kakoʻo is an on-demand ride serving Kona and Hilo, limited to riders who qualify through a separate application, and requires an appointment for each trip. The terms of the settlement were announced in August 2015.

=== Fares ===
From 2005 to 2011 and again in 2022 there was no charge to ride the Hele-On Bus. The standard fare was increased to $1 in 2011. As of July 1, 2013 fares were increased to two dollars per person (five years old or older). One dollar per suitcase. Beginning February 28, 2022, the bus is fare free, and there are no baggage or bicycle fees.

Hele-On Bus fares (2013-2022)
Type	Regular	Discount (Note: Groups eligible for discounted fare are: Seniors (60 and over); Persons with Disabilities and ID card; Students with ID)
Cash (Note: One-way fares; one free transfer is provided.)	$2	$1
Monthly pass	$60	$45
10-ticket sheet	$15	$7.50

Notes

The Hele-On Kakoʻo paratransit is also fare free

=== Fleet ===
Buses are primarily white with colored horizontal stripes in green, blue, or gold. Hele-On began receiving its first order of 15 new buses in 1975.

In 2015, Hele-On listed 55 vehicles in the fleet, but 18 of those were inoperable or beyond repair. By June 2018, the fleet was down to just 11 vehicles, the oldest four of which had been transferred to Hele-On Bus by TheBus (Honolulu). As an example, Bus #701, an Alexander Dennis Enviro500 was purchased in early 2010 at a cost of nearly US$900,000 and was intended to operate on the high-ridership cross-island line, but broke down after less than six months and 8,432 miles (13,570 km) and was not available for service again until late 2018. #701 broke down again after a few months and was taken out of service completely. In addition, Maui donated a double-deck Enviro500 bus to Hawaiʻi in 2018; it was originally built in 2004 and used in Kihei Islander service starting in 2013, but the Maui Enviro500 was received in non-operating condition. After accepting two donated buses from Maui in 2018, the County Council voted to pause further donations, citing concerns about maintenance and disposal.

One man stole buses in two separate incidents in August 2017. The first theft, which involved #342 and took place early in the morning of August 5, ended after the bus sideswiped another vehicle; the driver scheduled to operate #342 noticed it was missing, but it was not unusual for bus drivers to accidentally take a bus they were not assigned to drive. Police found the bus on August 6 while it was being driven on Hawaii Route 130 and stopped it in Pahoa, arresting the driver. The second theft came approximately three weeks after the first; the man had been placed under supervised release following the first theft. The same man apparently cut open the gate to the baseyard during the night of August 27–28, and after stealing another bus (#611), was spotted by police in Hilo at 6:24 a.m., and taken into custody at 6:45 a.m. at the Kawamoto Swim Stadium.

All four county mayors have signed a pledge to convert their transit bus fleets to renewable power by 2035. A battery electric bus was received by Hele-On in early 2018, but was parked and not used until summer 2019 due to insurance and license issues. In 2020, Hele-On Bus announced three hydrogen-powered buses had been donated: one was from the University of Hawaii Natural Energy Institute, a 2014 ElDorado National 29-passenger Aero Elite that had been converted from diesel to run on hydrogen fuel cells, and the other two were shuttle buses donated by Hawaiʻi Volcanoes National Park. All three were on Oahu pending funds to ship them to Hawaiʻi, and would be used for Circulator service within Kailua-Kona. Hydrogen is being produced at the Natural Energy Laboratory of Hawaii Authority.

MTA was awarded a federal grant in 2019 to purchase 10 new 40-foot (12 m) buses and planned to also expand coverage with new routes. Four new 25-passenger buses were delivered in 2020 (although capacity was reduced to just 7 passengers to comply with social distancing requirements resulting from the COVID-19 pandemic), and MTA won a grant to purchase 10 more 40-or-45-foot (12 or 14 m) buses that year. Honolulu donated another 10 "hillclimber" 30-foot (9.1 m) Gillig Phantom buses built in 1998 to Hele-On Bus in late 2020.

Hele-On Bus fleet
Year	Make / Model	No. (Qty)	Image	Seats	Notes
1995	Gillig Phantom	667, 669 (2)		45	Header signs non operational as of 2017.
1997	Gillig Phantom	341–347 (7)		45	Transferred from TheBus.
2000	Gillig Phantom	402 (1)		46	Suburban model.
2005	Gillig Phantom	406, 408 (2)		46	Suburban model.
2006	ElDorado National Aero Elite (Chevrolet Kodiak-based cutaway)	501–504 (4)		26	
2007	Gillig Phantom	409–413 (5)		45	
2008	ElDorado National AeroTech (Chevrolet Express-based cutaway)	101, 102, 104 (3)		15	
2010	ElDorado National Aero Elite (International TC-based cutaway)	305, 309, 312, 313 (4)		34	
2010	Alexander Dennis Enviro500	701 (1)		88	First double-decker bus in the state. Inaugural trip circling island took place on May 20, 2011 to gather food bank donations. Abandoned as of 2017 with transmission issues.
2010	MCI D4000CL	601, 602, 604, 605 (4)		50	Purchased using federal grant for $3.2 million. Initial order was for seven, delivered in 2010.
2013	MCI D4000CL	608 (1)		49	
2014	ElDorado National XHF	801–803 (3)		42	
2014	MCI D4000CL	610–611 (2)		49	
2015	MCI D4000CL	612–613 (2)		49	

Hele-On Bus retired fleet
Year	Make / Model	No. (Qty)	Image	Seats	Notes
1994	Neoplan USA Metroliner AN340/2	201–207 (7)		?	

=== Facilities ===
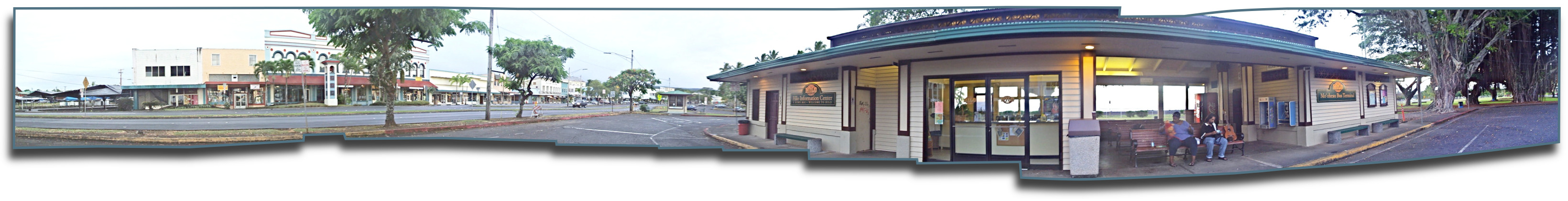
Panorama of Moʻoheau Bus Terminal in Hilo (2009)

Moʻoheau Park in Hilo has been used as a transfer point since the days of the "sampan" private buses, and serves as the primary transfer point for the Hele-On Bus system. The Moʻoheau Bus Terminal was renovated in 2012. Other towns projected to require transit hubs in the future include Kona and Pāhoa. A new Kona hub could be near Old Kona Airport Park.

The contract to construct a new bus baseyard in Hilo, serving as the system maintenance facility, was awarded in 2015; the new baseyard would occupy a 5-acre (2.0 ha) site at 2299 Hoʻolaulima Road, near a quarry. The new baseyard opened in 2018, replacing a site on East Lanikaula Street and Railroad Avenue shared with County Public Works. In addition to Hilo, buses also are stored in Kailua-Kona and Kaʻū to accommodate early-morning service into Hilo. A second base/maintenance facility is recommended to service routes on the north and west sides of the island, potentially near the police department on Hale Mākaʻi off Highway 19.

== See also ==
- TheBus (Honolulu) on Oʻahu Island
- The Kauaʻi Bus on Kauaʻi Island
- Maui Bus on Maui Island
