= Hawaii Route 541 =

State highway in Hawaii, United States

Hawaii Route 541
- Route 541 highlighted in red

Route information
- Maintained by HDOT
- Length: 0.4 mi (640 m)

Major junctions
- North end: Route 50 in Eleele
- South end: Dead end at Port Allen

Location
- Country: United States
- State: Hawaii

Highway system
- Routes in Hawaii
← Route 540	→ Route 550

Route 541 is a 0.4-mile-long (0.64 km) state highway stretching from Route 50 in Eleele near Hanapepe, Hawaii to a dead end at Port Allen at Hanapepe Bay. The road mainly connects port traffic and tourist traffic where many water-based tourism businesses are located.

== Route description ==
Route 541 begins at a parking lot for the Port Allen cruise port, traveling northeast along Waialdo Road as an undivided road for 1/5 mile (0.32 km) before a center median splits the road for the remainder of its route to an intersection with Route 50, the Kaumaualii Highway. The roadway continues north after this intersection as Eleele Road.

== Major intersections ==
The entire route is in Kauaʻi County.

Location	mi	km	Destinations	Notes
Port Allen	0	0.0	Dead end	Western terminus
ʻEleʻele	0.4	0.64	Route 50 (Kaumualiʻi Highway)	Eastern terminus
1.000 mi = 1.609 km; 1.000 km = 0.621 mi
