= Kōʻula River =

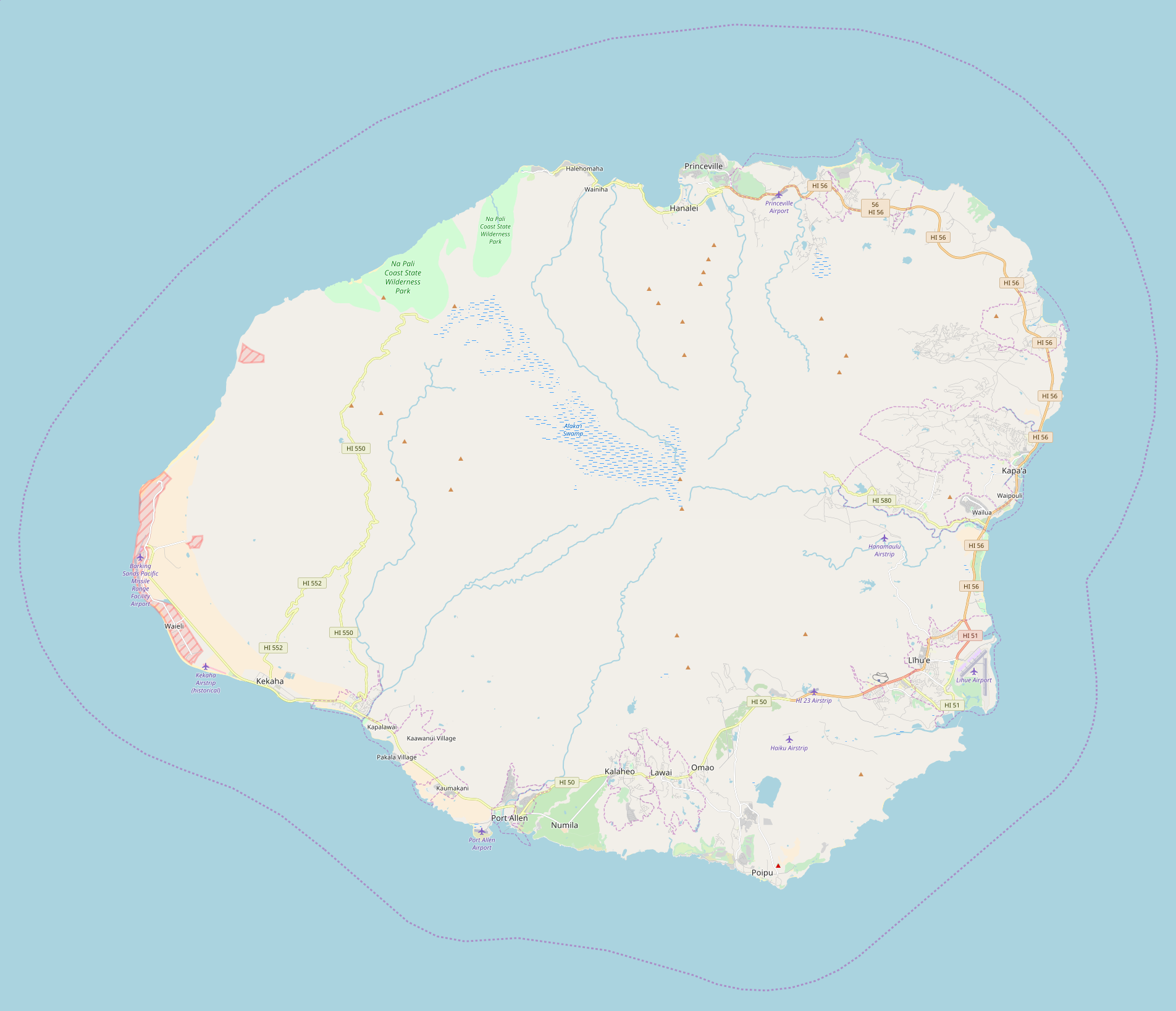
- Location within Kauai Location within Hawaii

Location
- Country: United States
- State: Hawaii

Physical characteristics
- Source: Mt. Waialeale
- Mouth: Hanapēpē River
  - coordinates: 21.95511°N 159.55054°W
  - elevation: 0 m (0 ft)
- Length: 14.8 km (9.2 mi)
- Discharge
  - location: mouth

The Kōʻula River is the largest tributary of the Hanapēpē River on the Hawaiian island of Kauai. It rises at 4,642 ft (1415 meters) on the slopes of Mt. Waialeale and flows generally south for 9.2 miles to its confluence with the Manuahi Stream. Beyond this point it is known as the Hanapēpē River. The river has a long-term mean discharge of 85.2 cubic feet (0.99 cubic meters) per second.
