= ENC Axess =

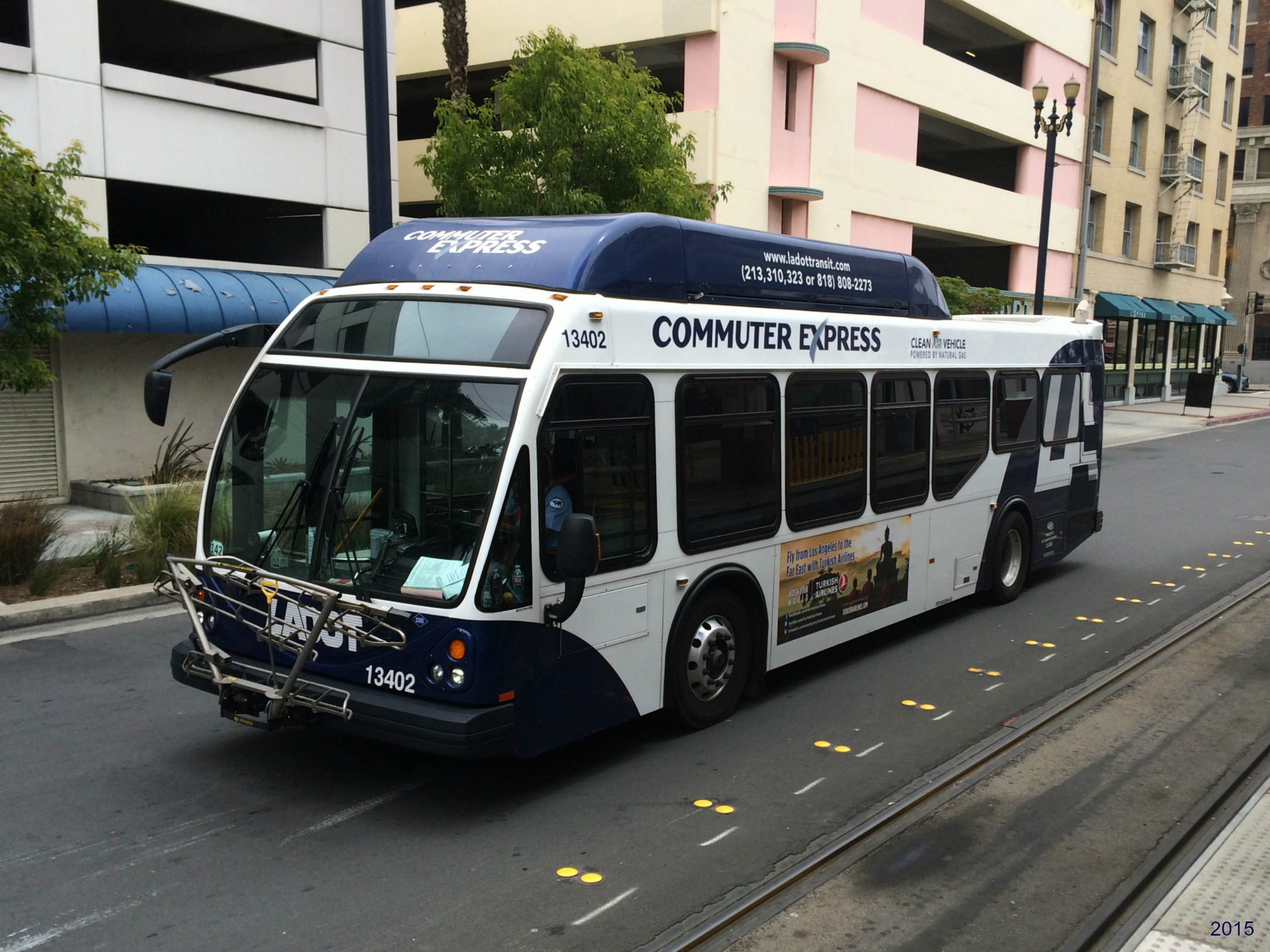
- Current ENC Axess design, with CNG tanks on roof, operated by LADOT

Overview
- Manufacturer: ENC
- Production: 2003–2015 (conventional); 2010+ (BRT)
- Assembly: Riverside, California

Body and chassis
- Class: Transit bus
- Body style: Monocoque stressed skin
- Layout: RR

Powertrain
- Engine: Diesel: Cummins L9; CNG/LNG: Cummins-Westport L9N
- Electric motor: Hybrid: Allison H 40; Hydrogen: BAE HDS200
- Transmission: Allison B 400R, Voith or ZF

Dimensions
- Wheelbase: 168 in (4.3 m) (32-foot); 215 in (5.5 m) (35-foot); 275 in (7.0 m) (40-foot)
- Length: 31 ft 8 in (9.65 m) (32-foot); 35 ft 2 in (10.72 m) (35-foot); 40 ft 4 in (12.29 m) (40-foot)
- Width: 102 in (2.6 m)
- Height: 126 in (3.2 m) (diesel); 135–140 in (3.4–3.6 m) (all others)
- Curb weight: 30,170 lb (13,680 kg) (40-foot diesel); 31,090–31,950 lb (14,100–14,490 kg) (40-foot CNG); 33,520 lb (15,200 kg) (40-foot hydrogen)

The ENC Axess is a line of low-floor transit buses available in 35-foot and 40-foot nominal lengths manufactured by ENC (formerly ElDorado National–California) in Riverside, California starting from 2003. In addition to the different available lengths, the buses are sold with a variety of prime movers, ranging from conventional diesel, LNG/CNG combustion engines, diesel-electric hybrid and hydrogen fuel cell with a traction motor.

The Axess was the first full-size heavy-duty transit bus, defined as ENC building both the chassis and body, offered by the company. Previously, ENC had built medium-duty mid-size transit and shuttle buses, with the company building a custom body on a commercial chassis.

In 2010, ENC began offering the Axess with an extended front cap and raked windshield as the Axess BRT, intended for bus rapid transit service; the conventional Axess was discontinued in 2015 and the Axess BRT became the sole styling option offered.

== Design ==
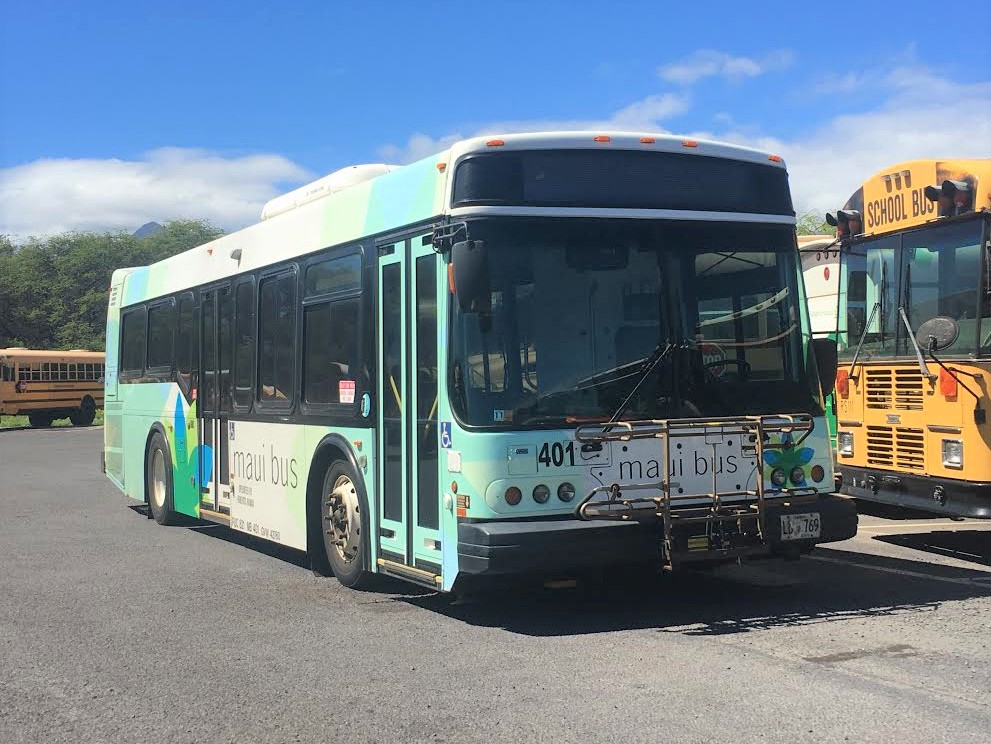
Original ENC Axess design, wrapped for Maui Bus

ElDorado National (California) filed an application in 2002 to trademark the name Axess, and the cited date of first use is 2003. It is the first heavy-duty transit bus offered by ElDorado National, who was better known previously for offering shuttle buses for universities, airport hotels, small transit fleets, and car rental services. Like most low-floor buses offered in North America, the Axess has a partial low-floor layout, where the seating area from the rear axle to the back of the bus is on an elevated platform to provide space for the engine and transmission. The CNG fueled variant is approximately 10% more expensive than the diesel.

The Axess BRT model increased overall length from 40 ft 8 in (12.4 m) to 41 ft 3 in (12.6 m), increasing the front overhang from 94 to 100 in (2.4 to 2.5 m).

=== Hybrid ===
The Axess is available with a hybrid drivetrain, at approximately a 50% premium compared to the cost of a bus with a conventional diesel engine. The supplemental electric traction motor and hybrid components are part of the EP System supplied by Allison Transmission, which automatically switches between parallel hybrid and series hybrid operation.

=== Fuel cell ===
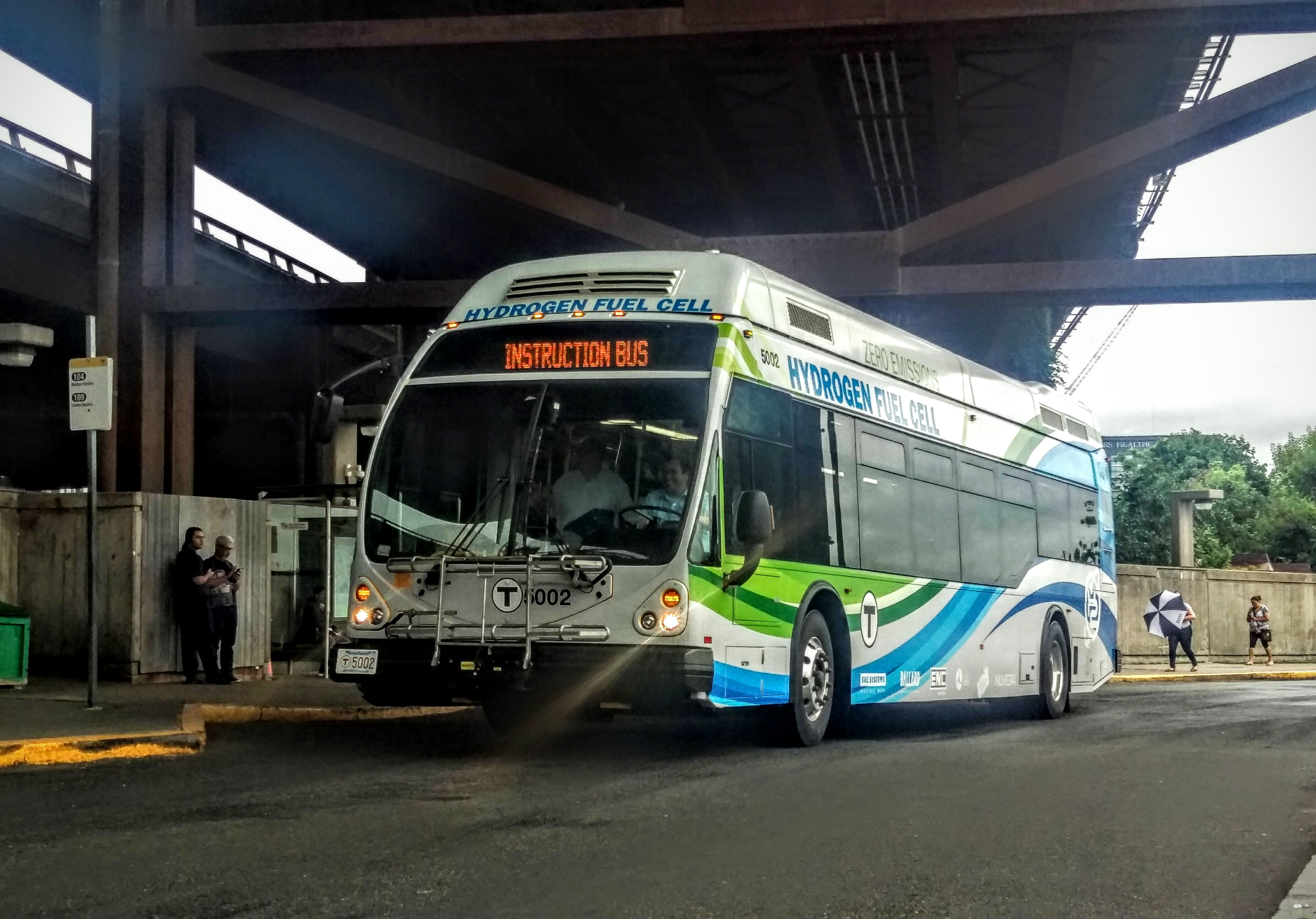
MBTA #5002, Axess FC with BRT styling at Sullivan Square station (2016)

The fuel cell variant of the Axess was developed under the sponsorship of the Federal Transit Administration as the American Fuel Cell Bus Project (AFCB Project), one of the projects established by the National Fuel Cell Bus Program (NFCB Program) in 2006. The AFCB Project was led by CALSTART and SunLine Transit Agency. Although AFCB was part of the initial round of NFCB Program grants starting in 2006, the planned manufacturing partners, including the bus platform vendor (New Flyer), fuel cell (UTC Power), and hybrid drivetrain (ISE Corporation), all withdrew from the AFCB Project shortly after it began. ElDorado National had previously worked with SunLine on the earlier ISE/UTC ThunderVolt fuel cell/hybrid bus, supplying an E-Z Rider II 30-foot bus chassis in the early 2000s.

After completing the Axess BRT chassis for the first AFCB, ElDorado National delivered it to BAE Systems in New York, who integrated the hybrid drivetrain and fuel cell systems; the first AFCB was delivered to SunLine in November 2011 as fleet number FC3. Revenue service at SunLine began in January 2012; FC3 met "Buy America" certification for American-made component content.

The fuel cell variant of the Axess uses an electric drivetrain that was developed by BAE Systems as a series hybrid for hybrid bus applications and branded HybriDrive. Unlike the conventional HybriDrive, which uses a motor-generator set to power the electric traction motor, electricity is generated by a 150 kW Ballard Power Systems FCveloCity-HD6 hydrogen fuel cell, with additional power supplied by a lithium-ion storage battery capable of providing 200 kW of power and a capacity of 11.2 kW-hr. Up to 50 kg (110 lb) of gaseous hydrogen fuel can be stored on board, compressed to 350 bar (5,100 psi). The electric traction motor has a continuous output rating of 215 hp (160 kW) and a peak output of 270 hp (200 kW). The fuel cell option is approximately 3 1/2 times the cost of a conventional (diesel-powered) Axess 40-foot bus.

A second-generation fuel cell bus, now branded Axess-FC, was unveiled in 2019 with improved range.

=== Battery electric ===
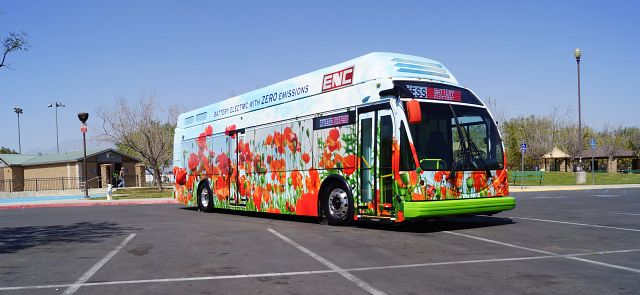
Battery-electric Axess

A battery electric Axess was available at approximately twice the cost of a conventional (diesel-powered) 40-foot Axess. In November 2021, the Axess-BEB, a production battery electric bus using the Axess chassis debuted at the APTA Expo; it is available in 32-foot, 35-foot, and 40-foot (nominal) lengths and uses a powertrain system sourced from Cummins, including the traction motor, inverter, and storage battery. Battery options include 444 or 518 kW-hr of storage with initial availability limited to a 40-foot model.

=== Axess EVO-BE/EVO-FC ===
ENC’s Axess EVO-BE and EVO-FC represent the next generation of zero emission transportation. With 738 kWh of energy storage, the Axess EVO-BE delivers a longer range per charge, making it ideal for transit and shuttle applications. Axess EVO-FC offers an estimated range of over 400 miles with its high-power hydrogen fuel cell and proven electric powertrain. Both buses are available in multiple configurations for passenger seating and wheelchair accommodation.

== Deployment ==
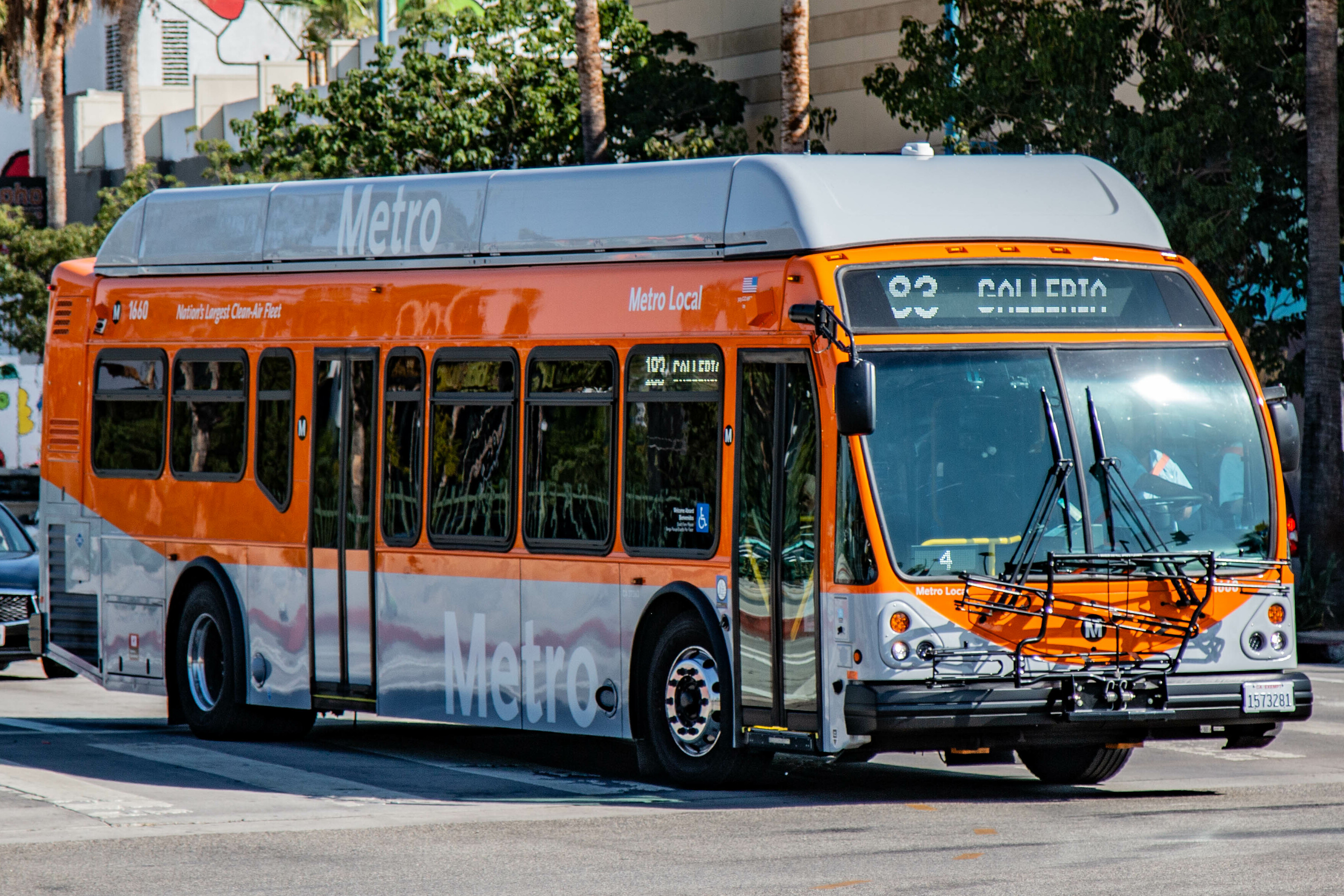
ENC Axess bus operated by LA Metro

125 Axess buses were shipped to airport facilities in California and Florida in 2004 and 2005. Some of the buses shipped to Fort Lauderdale–Hollywood International Airport had diesel-electric hybrid powertrains.

One of the largest operators of the ENC Axess is the Los Angeles County Metropolitan Transportation Authority, located close to the ENC plant in Riverside. LA Metro has purchased nearly 600 CNG-powered, 40-foot buses, comprising over 25% of the agency's bus fleet.

=== Fuel Cell bus operators ===
Before FC3 entered revenue service with SunLine Transit as the first fuel cell Axess, the E-Z Rider II-based ThunderVolt bus had been assigned SunLine Transit fleet number FC1 in 2002, and a subsequent New Flyer Industries H40LFR-based bus (originally built for BC Transit) was tested and assigned FC2. SunLine received eight additional AFCBs with the same drivetrain as FC3 and improvements to the battery and fuel cell cooling systems between 2014 and 2018, which were assigned fleet numbers FC4 through FC12 (skipping FC7). FC7 was a variant of the Axess-based AFCB, built as a "battery dominant" bus with a lower fuel cell output.

Unlike FC3, which had its powertrain and fuel cell installed in New York, the subsequent AFCBs were all assembled entirely at ElDorado National's Riverside, California factory. By July 2018, ENC had produced 20 fuel cell buses for transit agencies throughout California, including SunLine, UC Irvine (2015), and OCTA (2016). Also in 2018, the AFCB/Axess-FC was the first fuel cell bus to complete the heavy-duty transit bus (12-year/500,000 mi (800,000 km) lifecycle) testing at Altoona, Pennsylvania.

In 2017, MBTA bus operations announced plans to test an AFCB/Axess; an earlier MBTA fuel cell bus was designed in 2008 with a Nuvera/Fiat fuel cell and a BAE HybriDrive hybrid powertrain.

== Competition ==
- Gillig Low Floor
- Proterra ZX5
- New Flyer Xcelsior
- New Flyer Low Floor - Discontinued (1991–2014)
- Nova Bus LFS - Discontinued in United States (1996-2025)
- NABI LFW - Discontinued (1997–2015)
- Neoplan AN440L - Discontinued (1981–2006)
- Orion VII - Discontinued (2001–2013)
