= Prince Kuhio Plaza =

Coordinates: 19°41′50″N 155°3′48″W

Prince Kūhiō Plaza
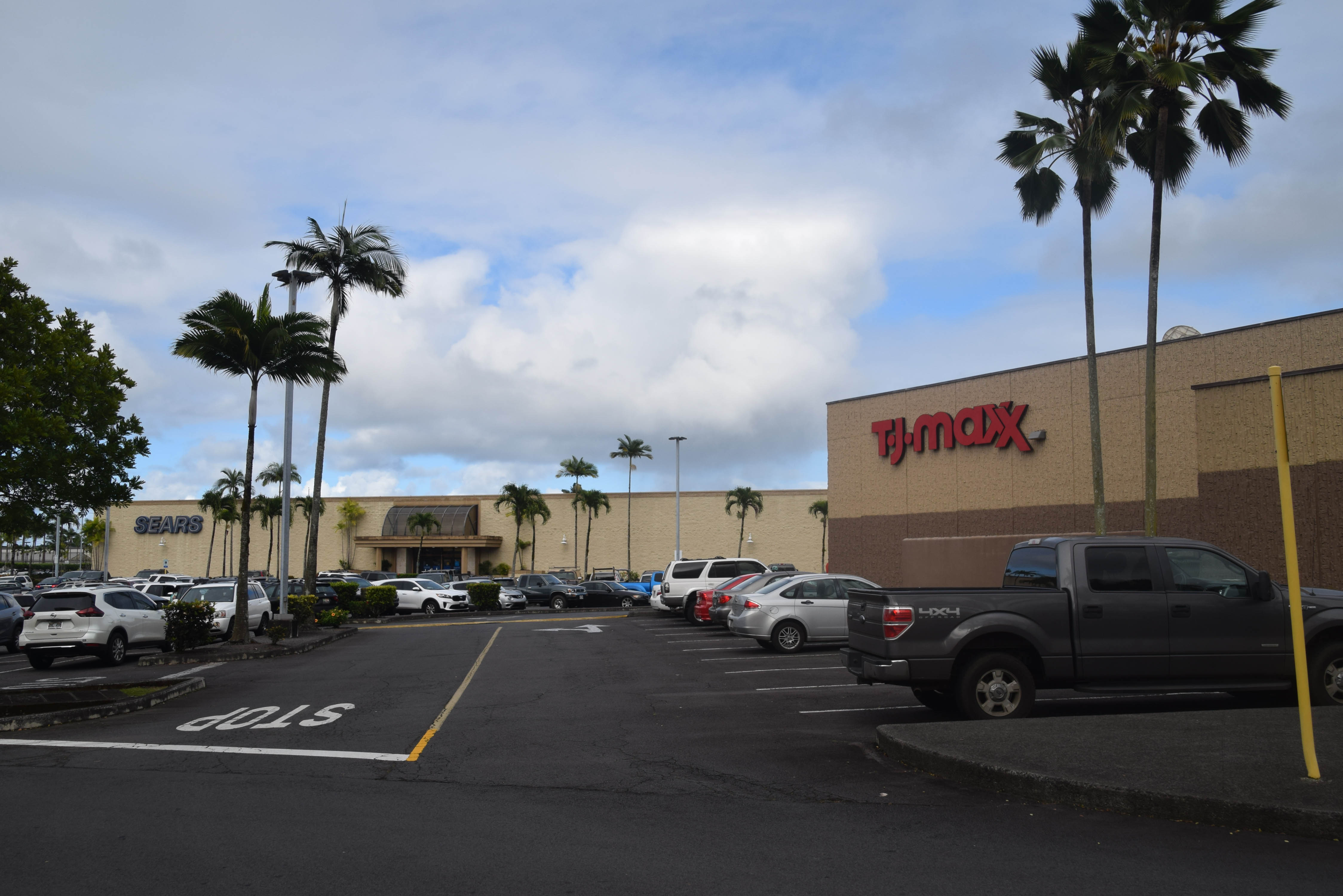
- The outside view of Prince Kuhio Plaza, with Sears and T.J. Maxx
- Location: Hilo, Hawaii
- Address: 111 East Puainako Street
- Opened: 1985; 41 years ago
- Developer: Orchid Isle Group
- Manager: GGP
- Owner: GGP
- Num. of stores: 65
- Num. of anchor tenants: 5 (1 vacant)
- Floor area: 495,277 square feet (46,012.7 m^{2})
- Floors: 1
- Parking: 1
- Website: www.princekuhioplaza.com

Prince Kūhiō Plaza is a single-level regional shopping mall in Hilo, Hawaii. It is the largest enclosed mall on the Island of Hawaii. Anchor stores are two Macy's stores, TJ Maxx, and Petco. Other major tenants include a 9-screen movie theatre operated by Regal Cinemas, Tractor Supply Company, and Longs Drugs. Sears was an anchor of the plaza until closing in 2021. The mall is owned and operated by Brookfield Properties through shopping mall operator subsidiary GGP.

The mall is named for Prince Jonah Kuhio Kalanianaole, who served as Congressional Delegate from 1903 to 1922.

== History ==
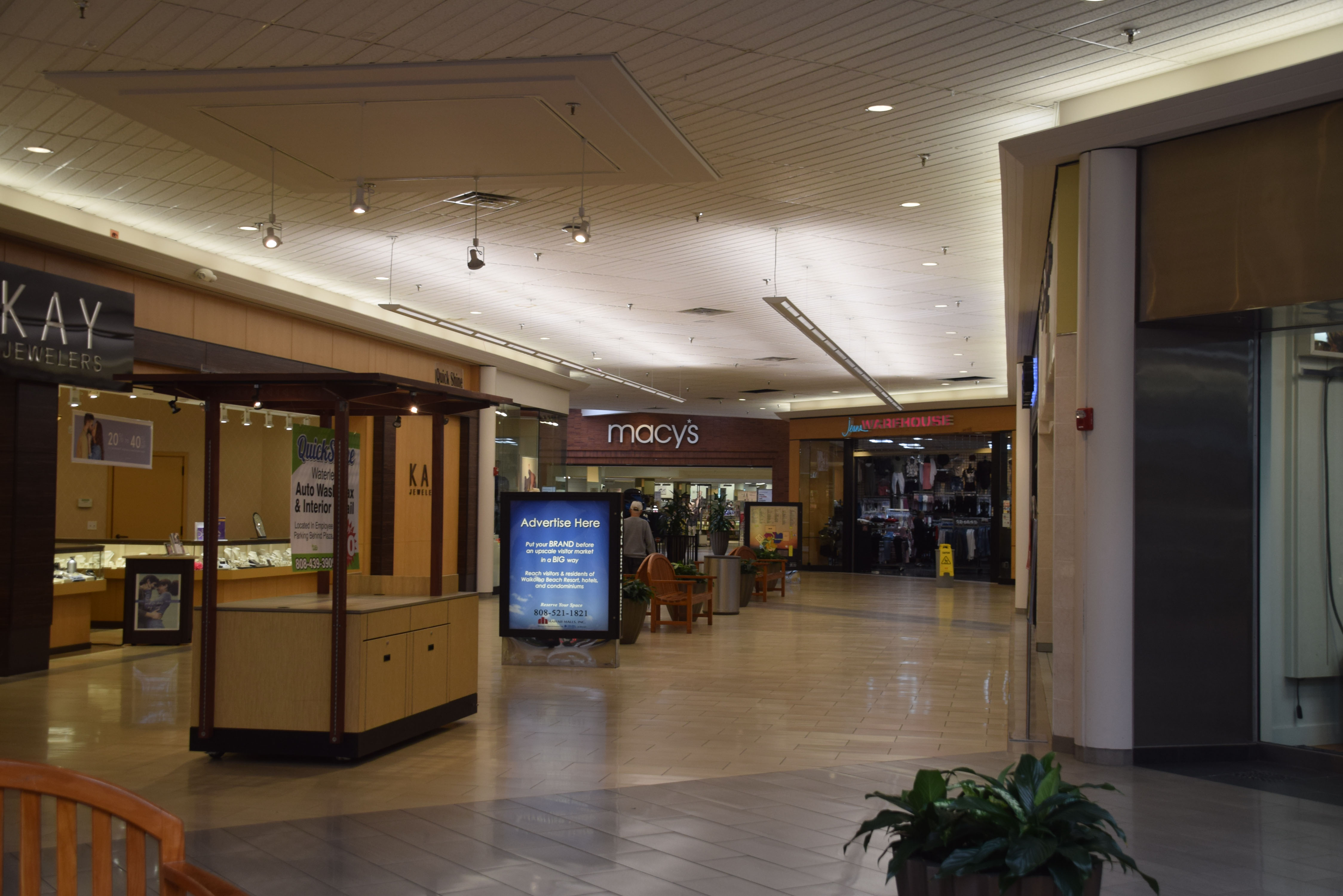
The inside view of Prince Kuhio Plaza, Hilo, Hawaii, with Macy's

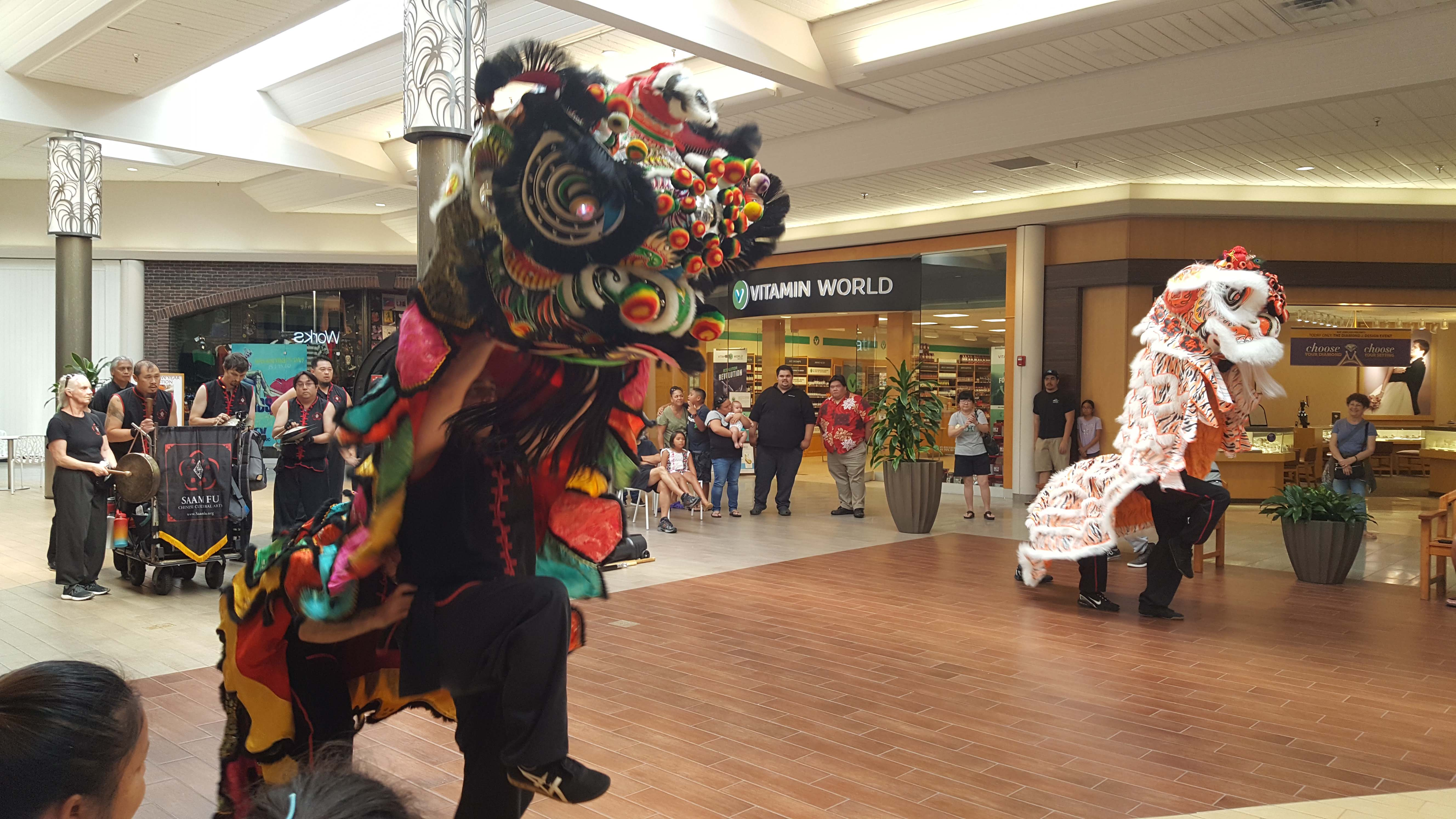
Various events are held at Prince Kuhio Plaza, such as Lion dance for Chinese New Year (2020)

In September 1977, the Department of Hawaiian Home Lands (DHHL) offered to lease 39 acres (160,000 m^{2}) of land at the intersection of Pū'āinakō Street and Kanoelehua Avenue (part of the Hawaii Belt Road) for development into retail space, which had been lacking in the area. Orchid Isle Group, the sole bidder for the property, signed a 53-year lease on October 28, 1977.

The mall opened in 1985.

On August 5, 2002, General Growth acquired the 50% interest in the mall that was owned by Homart Development Company, bringing its ownership in the mall to 100%.

In 2001, Macy's acquired the Liberty House store at the mall, followed by acquiring the vacant JCPenney space two years later for its men's, children's, and home store.

In 2004, the owner of the shopping center was sued by Longs Drugs for allowing a Safeway to be constructed at the mall.

In 2013, First Hawaiian Bank opened a branch at the mall. The building was built after the demolition of former tenant Blockbuster.

In 2015, Old Navy and Pier 1 Imports opened stores in the mall.

In 2018, TJ Maxx and Petco opened stores in the mall. Subsequently, Petco opened a space in April 2018. Their space was formerly occupied by Sports Authority, which closed in 2014.

In 2020, a Tractor Supply Company store opened. Its space was formerly occupied by Safeway, who vacated the space in 2011.

On January 29, 2021, it was announced that Sears would be closing as part of a plan to close 23 stores nationwide. The store closed on April 18, 2021.

DHHL leasing dispute

In 2022, it was reported that negotiations between land owner DHHL and Prince Kuhio Plaza were in dispute. The dispute stems from Act 236, passed the previous year, which is disputed by the US Congress in regards to allowing the DHHL to create long term leases. Additionally, DHHL cites that the lack of Hawaiian cultural activities on the property, which was part of the land agreement, is the reason for not extending the lease; When a hearing was in October 2022, it received mostly negative testimony. The current agreement would let Prince Kuhio Plaza lease the land through 2042; The mall is seeking a lease extension until 2082.

== Layout ==
=== Main building ===
The main building is an indoor mall. Each wing of the mall has an anchor space and additional tenants, along with an entrance and exit. The mall has a dedicated food court area is located on the north side of the building, which features seating and tables for customers. Various events are held at the mall's stage, located in the center of the mall.

=== Additional buildings ===
In addition to the main building, a strip mall is located on the east side of the mall, which includes chains such as Jamba Juice and Starbucks. A fast food space is located next to the mall, which is currently occupied by KFC (Kentucky Fried Chicken). On the west side of the mall, a commercial office building is located, housing tenants such as Longs Drugs and Tractor Supply Company. An additional retail building is located on the southeast side of the mall, which was constructed in 2017 after the closure of a Hilo Hattie store in 2016. The building houses multiple tenants, including, as of 2025, a Genki Sushi, Verizon, and a Spectrum store.

=== Transportation ===
The mall has a bus stop located on the east side of the mall, operated by Hele-On Bus. The bus stop serves as a satellite hub for the transit service and is a major stop among many routes. For parking, the mall has a surface parking lot on-property, along with an additional parking lot located across the street.
