= Maui Bus =

Public transit service on the island of Maui, Hawaii

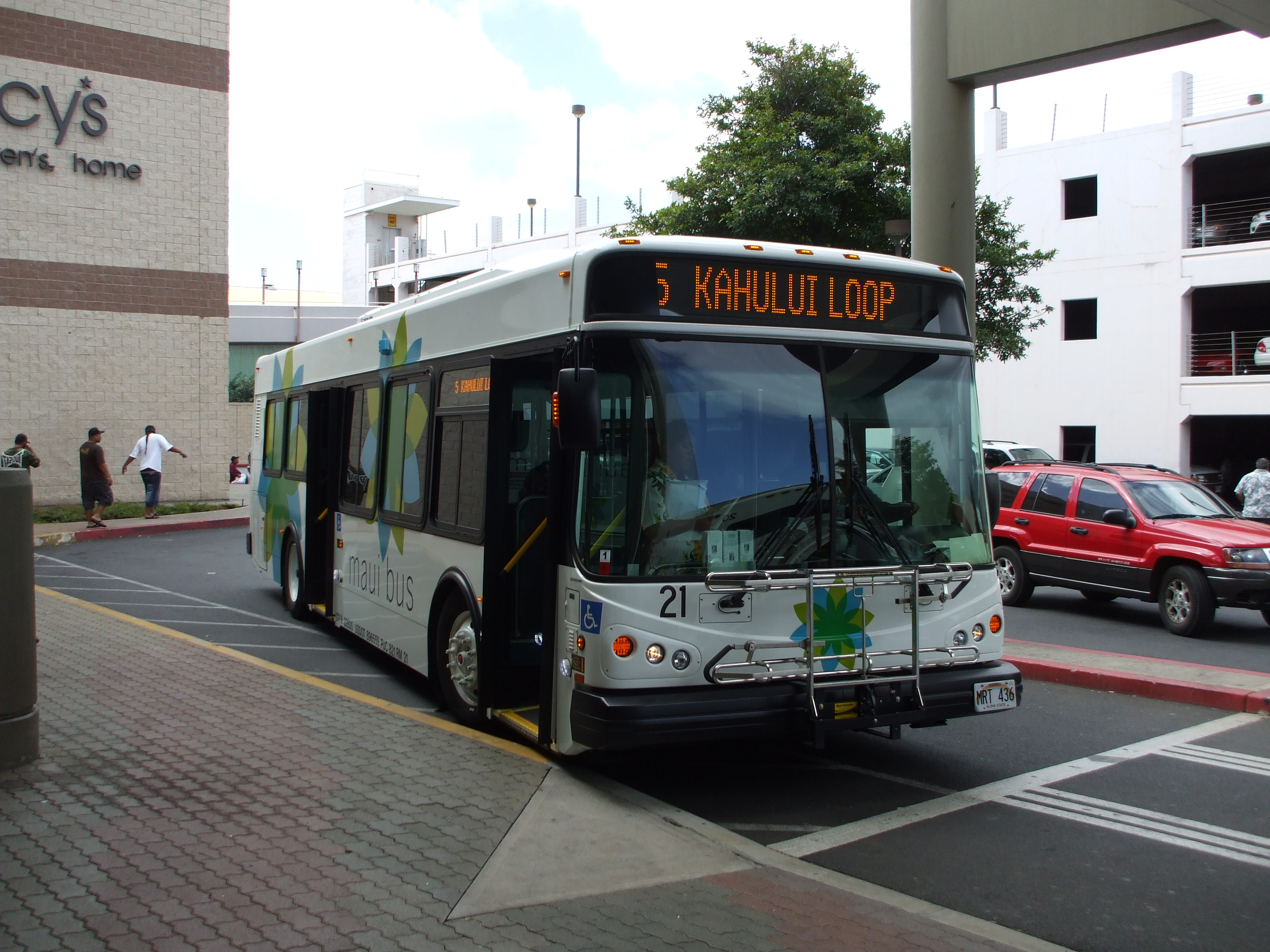
- Parent: Maui County
- Headquarters: Wailuku, Hawaii
- Service area: Maui County, Hawaii
- Service type: bus service, paratransit, express bus service
- Routes: 12 regular 4 commuter
- Fuel type: Diesel
- Operator: Roberts Hawaii
- Website: Bus Service Information

Maui Bus is the public transportation service of the island of Maui, Hawaii, and is operated by Roberts Hawaii under a public-private partnership with Maui County government. They operate 13 regular local bus routes and 4 commuter routes, which have a single early morning run and a return trip in the afternoon.

== History ==
The first public transit service on Maui started in 1992 with two loop routes in Central Maui operated by the non-profit organization Maui Economic Opportunity (MEO). These were operated over the same route in opposite directions, offered free of charge with a suggested donation.

The Maui Bus service was started as the Holo Kaʻa service in August 2002 with a joint venture between the private company Akina Aloha Tours, MEO, and the county government in a subsidized joint venture to provide bus service for South, West, and Central Maui. Low ridership (blamed on the lack of advertising for the system) led to Akina Aloha Tours losing $1 million over the following two years.

Service was reduced in July 2004 to five transit routes: three operated by Roberts Hawaii, one by Akina Aloha Tours (privately financed), and the one bidirectional route by MEO. The Roberts routes were named Routes A, B, and C: Route A operated between Maʻalea Harbor Village and the Shops at Wailea via Kihei [which is now Route #15]; Route B connected Kahului to Wharf Cinema Center (in Lahaina) via Maʻalea [now Route #20]; and Route C connected the Queen Kaʻahumanu Center with the Shops at Wailea [now Route #10]. The MEO routes served Central Maui (Wailuku and Kahului) with a loop route operated in opposite directions [now Routes #1/2 and #5/6]. The Akina Aloha route operated between Kaʻanapali and Lahaina [now Route #28].

The Short Range Transit Plan (SRTP) published in January 2005 evaluated contemporary demand and service conditions and developed the current fixed routes, including the expansion of service to Upcountry Maui. The 2005 SRTP also developed the branding and logo of Maui Bus, which began operations in 2006; the fixed and commuter routes are operated by Roberts Hawaii, while the paratransit services are operated by MEO. Ridership rose sharply over the ten years between 2002 and 2012, from less than 200,000 (annual passengers) to more than 2,500,000.

=== August 2023 wildfires ===
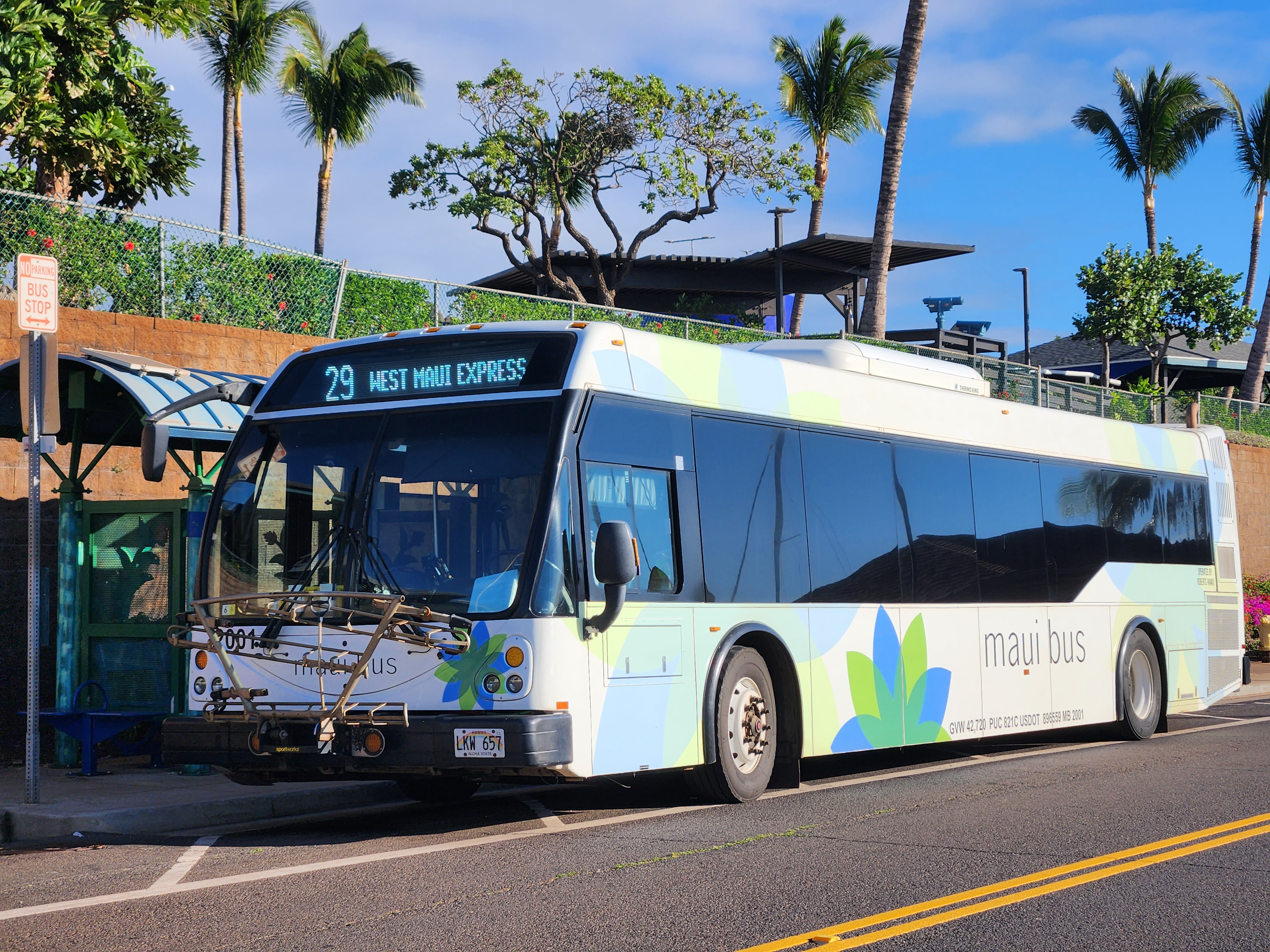
Route 29 West Maui Express is a temporary route established to maintain service to West Maui during evacuations in Lahaina due to the 2023 Hawaii wildfires

Due to the 2023 Hawaii wildfires, fare collection was suspended from August 23, 2023 until January 31, 2024. Due to evacuations in Lahaina, routes 20, 23, 25, and 28 were discontinued and replaced with a temporary route 29, running express from Kahului to Kaʻanapali (with a stop in Ma'alaea) via the Lahaina bypass before continuing along the former route 28. On November 5, 2023, a stop at Lahiana Cannery Mall was added to route 29, and a modified route 23, providing limited local service in Lahiana, was reintroduced.

== Service ==
The current Maui Bus service includes 13 fixed routes, 4 commuter routes, and a paratransit program that provides curb-to-curb service with advance reservations, serving western, central, and southern communities, including Wailuku, Kahului, Lahaina, Haiku, Kula, and Upcountry Maui.

=== Fixed routes ===
The Central Maui System includes the routes numbered with a single digit. The (southern) Kihei Route System includes routes numbered in the 10s. The (western) Lahaina, Kaʻanapali and Napili Route System includes routes numbered in the 20s. The Upcountry Route System includes routes numbered in the 30s, including #40. On average, 6,500 passengers board the Maui Bus fixed-route system, with an average per-passenger trip cost of $2.47.

For fixed-route service, Loop services operate within Central Maui, Villager services are routes that circulate within a single community (Lahaina, Kihei, and Kula), and Islander services are longer routes that connect different communities to Central Maui. Most of the Islander routes connect at a privately owned site at the Queen Kaʻahumanu Center shopping mall in Kahului, where transfers can be made to other Islander routes or the local Loop/Villager routes. Other significant transfer and boarding sites include Wharf Cinema Center, Whalers Village, Piʻilani Village Shopping Center, and War Memorial Stadium. The War Memorial Stadium site is used as a park-and-ride or drop-off location for three of the four commuter routes.

Both the Kahului and Wailuku Loops are bidirectionally operated over the same routes: #1 (Wailuku Loop) and #6 (Kahului) operate clockwise, while #2 (Waikluki) and #5 (Kahului) operate counter-clockwise. Officially, #2 and #6 are the reverse routes.

Regular Routes
No.	Name	Description	Service Hours	Headway
1/2	Wailuku Loop	Kahului-Wailuku (not shown on map)	6:30 a.m. – 8:30 p.m.	60 min
5/6	Kahului Loop	Kahului (not shown on map)	6:30 a.m. – 8:30 p.m.	60 min
8	Waiheʻe Villager	Kahului-Waiheʻe	7:15 a.m. – 8:00 p.m.	180 min
10	Kihei Islander	Kahului-Maalaea-Kihei-Wailea	5:30 a.m. – 7:30 p.m.	60 min
15	Kihei Villager	Maalaea-Kihei	6:05 a.m. – 8:05 p.m.	60 min
20 *SUSPENDED UNTIL FURTHER NOTICE*	Lahaina Islander	Kahului-Wailuku-Maalaea-Lahaina	5:30 a.m. – 7:30 p.m.	60 min
23	Lahaina Villager	Lahaina (not shown on map)	8:00 a.m. – 7:00 p.m.	60 min
25 *SUSPENDED UNTIL FURTHER NOTICE*	Kaʻanapali Islander	Lahaina-Kaʻanapali	2:30 p.m. – 5:00 p.m.	60 min
28 *SUSPENDED UNTIL FURTHER NOTICE*	West Maui Islander	Lahaina-Kaʻanapali-Kapalua	5:30 a.m. – 8:30 p.m.	60 min
29	West Maui Express	Kahului-Lahaina-Kaʻanapali-Kapalua	5:00 a.m. – 10:30 p.m.	60 min
35	Haiku Islander	Kahului-Paʻia-Haiku	5:30 a.m. – 8:30 p.m.	90 min
39	Kula Islander	Pukalani-Kula-Makawao	7:00 a.m. – 9:00 p.m.	180 min
40	Upcountry Islander	Kahului-Pukalani-Makawao-Haliʻimaile	6:00 a.m. – 9:00 p.m.	90 min

=== Commuter routes ===
Commuter routes are named for the termini, listed in order of morning origin and destination, respectively. For the afternoon commute, the route is reversed. Three of the four commuter routes meet in Wailuku at War Memorial Stadium. Three of the four bring commuters to the Kapalua/Napili/Kaʻanapali area in the morning. Only one commuter route operates more than once per day.

During the COVID-19 pandemic, commuter service was reduced in response to a decrease in ridership.

Commuter Routes
No.	Name	Origin (AM)	Destination (AM)	Service Hours	Trips
No.	Name	Destination (PM)	Origin (PM)	Service Hours	Trips
80	Haiku – Wailea	Haiku (Haiku Community Center)	Wailea (Hotels)	5:30 am; 4:30 pm	1
81	Kihei – Kapalua	Kihei (Kilohana St & S Kihei Rd)	Kapalua / Napili	6:00 am; 4:05 pm	1
82	Makawao – Kapalua	Makawao (Eddie Tam Gym)	Kapalua / Napili	5:30 am; 4:05 pm	1
83	Wailuku – Kapalua	Wailuku (War Memorial Stadium)	Kapalua / Napili	5:30–6:45 am; 3:05–4:30 pm	4 (Note: 15–45 minute headways) (Note: One of the afternoon return trips departs from Kaʻanapali at 4:15 pm instead of Kapalua.)

=== Former and proposed fixed routes ===
Neither of the fixed-route loops in Central Maui serve Kahului Airport, and the long headways on the two Upcountry routes that do (#35 and #40) led to the recommendation to add direct service between Wailuku and the airport.

Former and Proposed Routes
No.	Name	Description	Service Hours	Headway
3/4	Wailuku-Airport	Kahului Airport-Wailuku	6:30 a.m. to 10:00 p.m.	30–60 min (Note: Shorter headways during peak commute hours)
7	Wailuku Central	Wailuku	6:30 a.m. to 8:00 p.m.	30–60 min
9	Maui Business Park	Kahului	6:30 a.m. to 10:00 p.m.	30–60 min
15A	North Kihei Villager	Maʻalea–Kihei	5:30 a.m. to 9:00 p.m.	60 min
15B	South Kihei Villager	Kihei	5:30 a.m. to 9:00 p.m.	60 min
23A	Lahaina Villager	Lahianaluna	7:00 a.m. to 11:00 p.m.	60 min
23B	Lahaina Villager	Lahaina Civic Center	7:30 a.m. to 10:30 p.m.	60 min
38	Paʻia Town-Makawao Villager	Paʻia–Makawao	8:00 a.m. to 9:30 p.m.	90 min

== Fleet ==
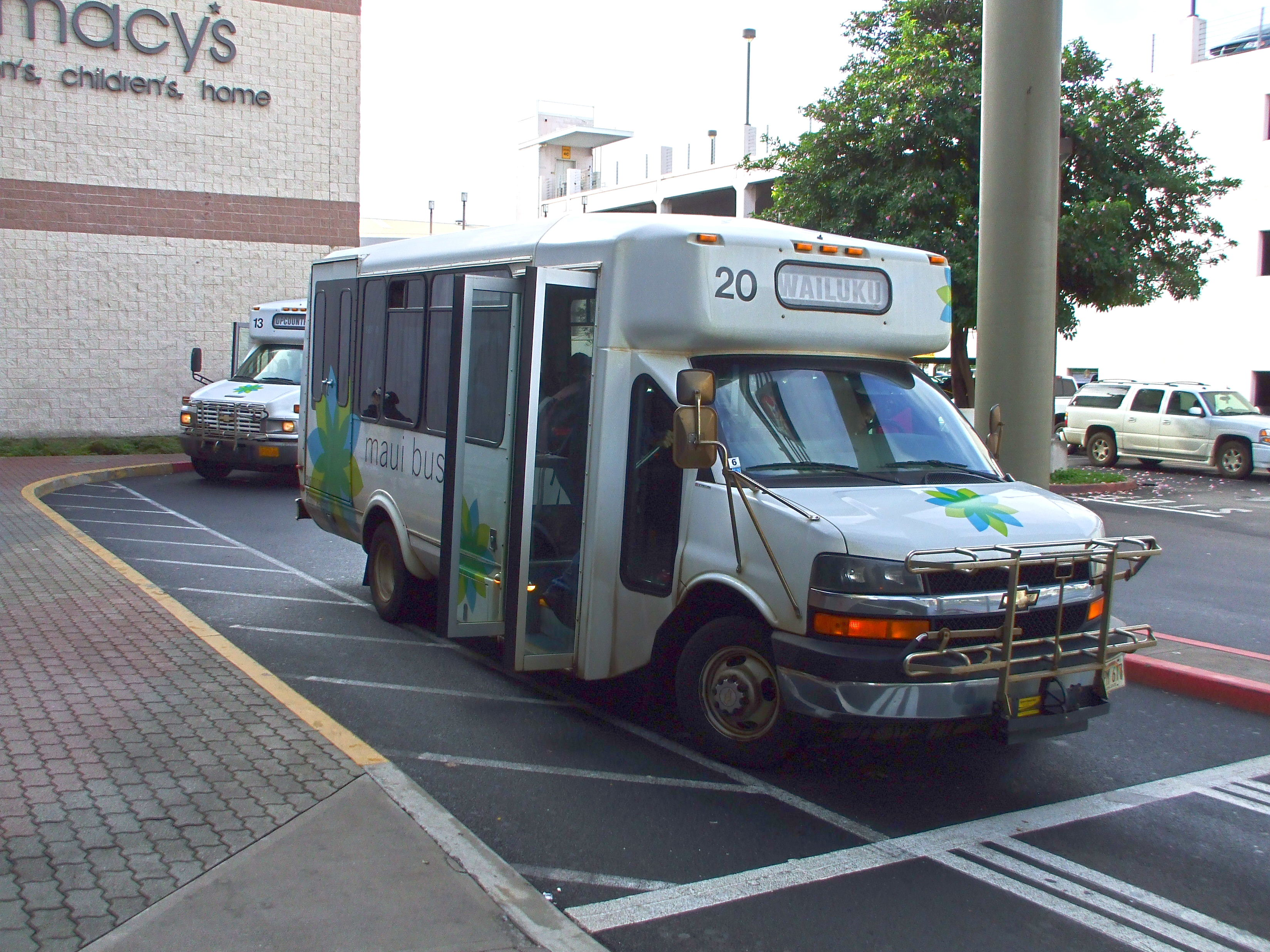
ElDorado Aero Elite Bus.

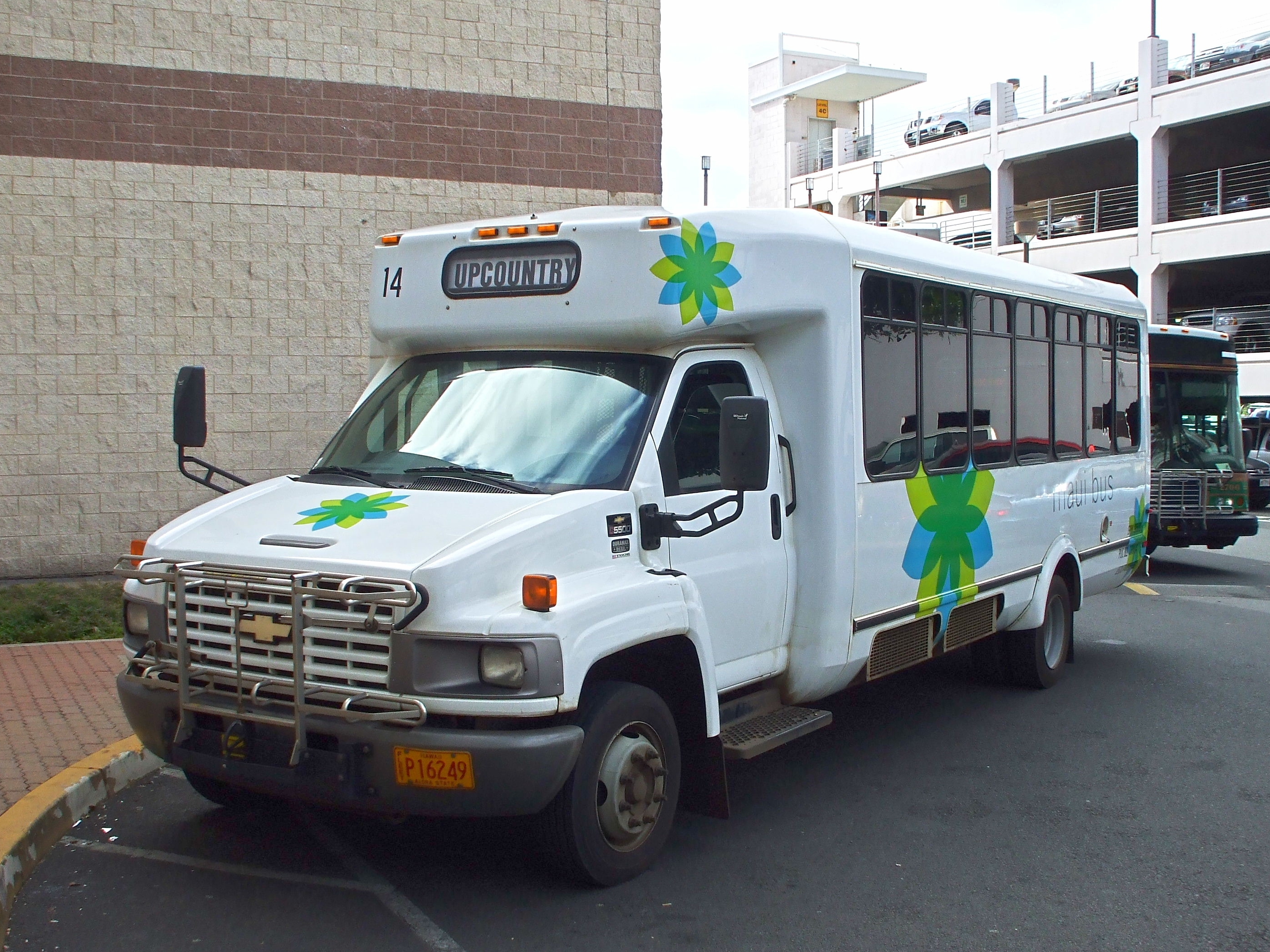
ElDorado Aero Elite bus

Active Maui Bus fleet (fixed route service)
Year	Qty	Image	Make	Model	Capacity	Lift or Ramp	Wheelchair Tie-downs	Notes
2008	7		ElDorado National	E-Z Rider II	37	Ramp	4	
2010	5		ElDorado National	E-Z Rider II	37	Ramp	4	
2014	10		ElDorado National	AXESS	32	Ramp	2	
2015	4		ElDorado National	Aero Elite	25	Lift	2	
2019	2		ElDorado National	AXESS BRT	32	Ramp	2	
2020	4		ElDorado National	AXESS BRT	32	Ramp	2	

Retired Maui Bus fleet (fixed route service)
Year	Qty	Image	Make	Model	Capacity	Lift or Ramp	Wheelchair Tie-downs	Notes
2004	1		Alexander Dennis	Enviro500	81	Ramp	2	
2007	6		ElDorado National	AXESS	41	Ramp	2	Retired in 2020
2011	1		ElDorado National	Aero Elite	25	Lift	2	
2013	1		ARBOC	Spirit of Mobility	17	Ramp	4	

== Fares ==
Cash fares are $2.00 per person per boarding. No transfers are given, but a day pass, at $4.00 per person, is valid on all routes. An all-route monthly pass is available at a cost of $45.00, with reduced rates of $30.00 for students and $25.00 for seniors (defined as 55 and over) and disabled holders of a valid Medicare card.

== Facilities ==
Because the County of Maui uses contracted operators for the Maui Bus service, the County-owned buses are operated and maintained by its contractors and the Maui Department of Transportation does not have a dedicated facility to store, refuel, and maintain the buses. However, in 2013, the County purchased an undeveloped 309-acre (125 ha) site in Waikapu with plans to consolidate existing garage and yard facilities for other County departments with a new bus yard. The proposed bus yard would be a 10-acre (4.0 ha) parcel at Waikapu, to be operated by a single private contractor, with space to park 100 buses (expandable to 150) and five to ten maintenance bays. The site lies east of a proposed extension to Waiale Road, west of Kuihelani Highway.

The existing fixed-route services use Queen Kaʻahumanu Center (QKC) as a hub and transfer point; the privately owned shopping center notified the County of Maui in 2017 that it would not renew its lease and the buses would be forced to vacate the site by 2020. Plans are underway to develop a 0.85-acre (0.34 ha) site next to QKC, near the Kahului Public Library at Vevau and School, as the Central Maui Transit Hub.

MEO operates a transportation facility in Puʻunene.
