= Hanapēpē River =

River located on the island of Kauai

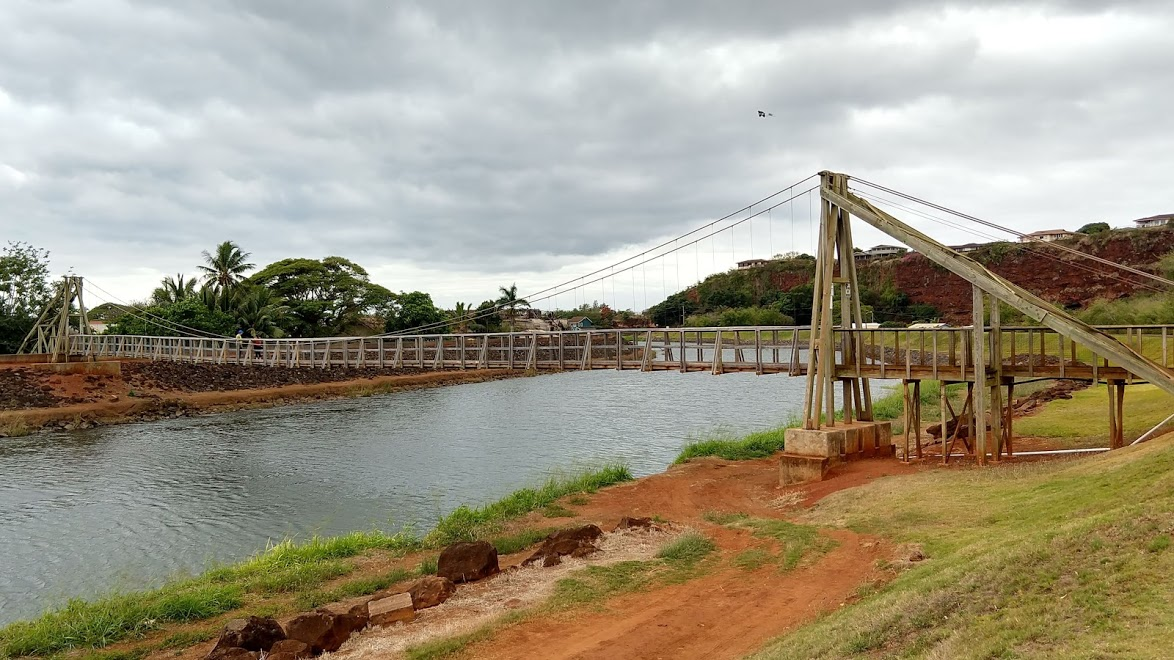
- Swinging bridge across the river in Hanapēpē

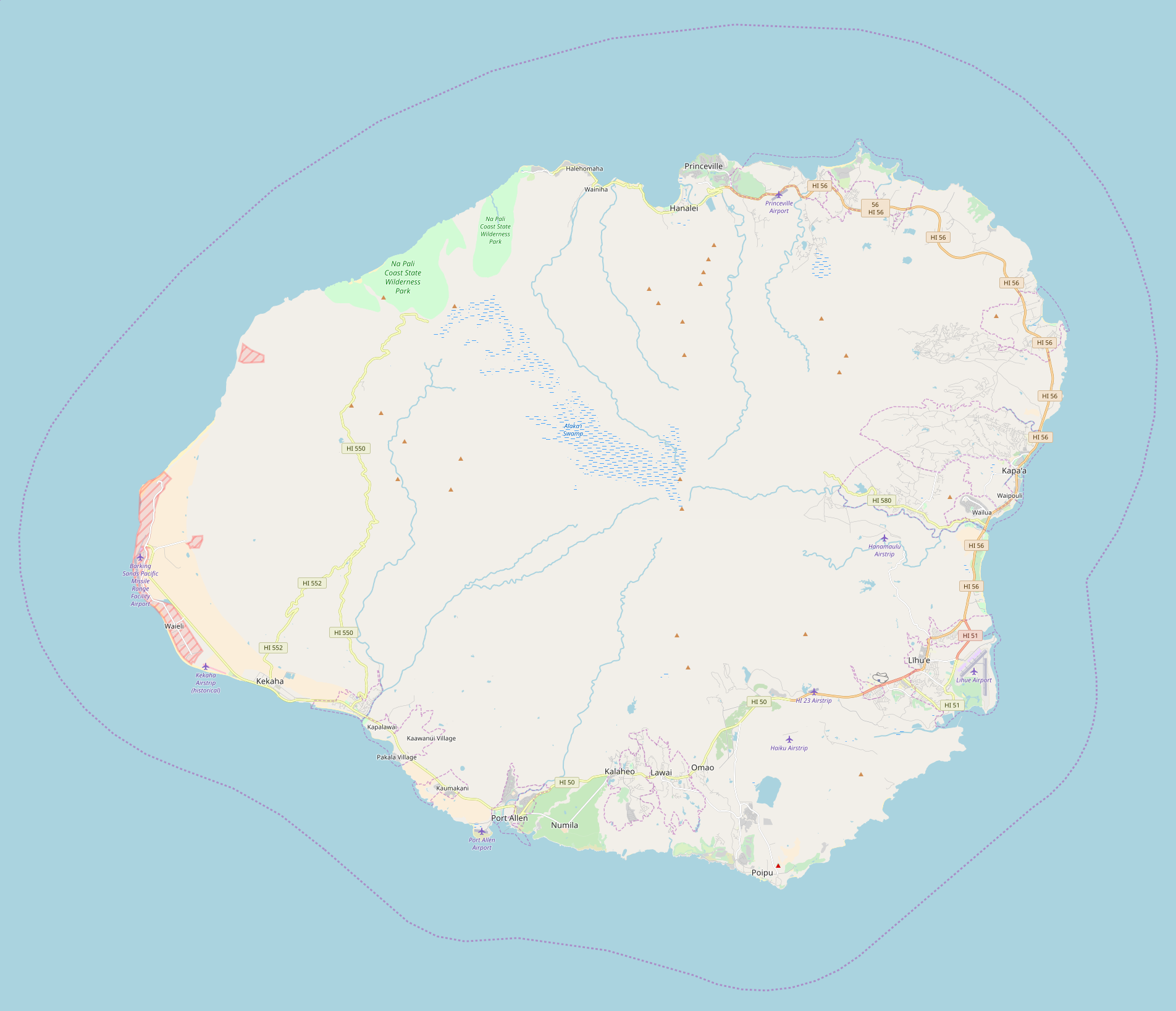
- Location of mouth Hanapēpē River (Hawaii)

Location
- Country: United States
- State: Hawaii

Physical characteristics
- Source: Confluence of the Kōʻula River and Manuahi stream
- Mouth: Pacific Ocean
  - location: Hanapēpē, ʻEleʻele
  - coordinates: 21°54′15″N 159°35′29″W
  - elevation: 0 m (0 ft)
- Length: 24.2 km (15.0 mi)
- Basin size: 27.7 sq mi (72 km^{2})
- Discharge
  - location: Below Manuahi stream
  - average: 85.2 cu ft/s (2.41 m^{3}/s)

The Hanapēpē River is a river on the Hawaiian island of Kauaʻi. It begins at the confluence of the Kōʻula River with the Manuahi Stream and flows generally south, with a total length of 24.2 km (15.0 mi) to its mouth at Hanapēpē and ʻEleʻele in the Pacific Ocean. The watershed covers an area of 27.7 square miles, draining roughly a twentieth of the island. The name Hanapēpē translates to "crushed bay," which may refer to landslides in the area.

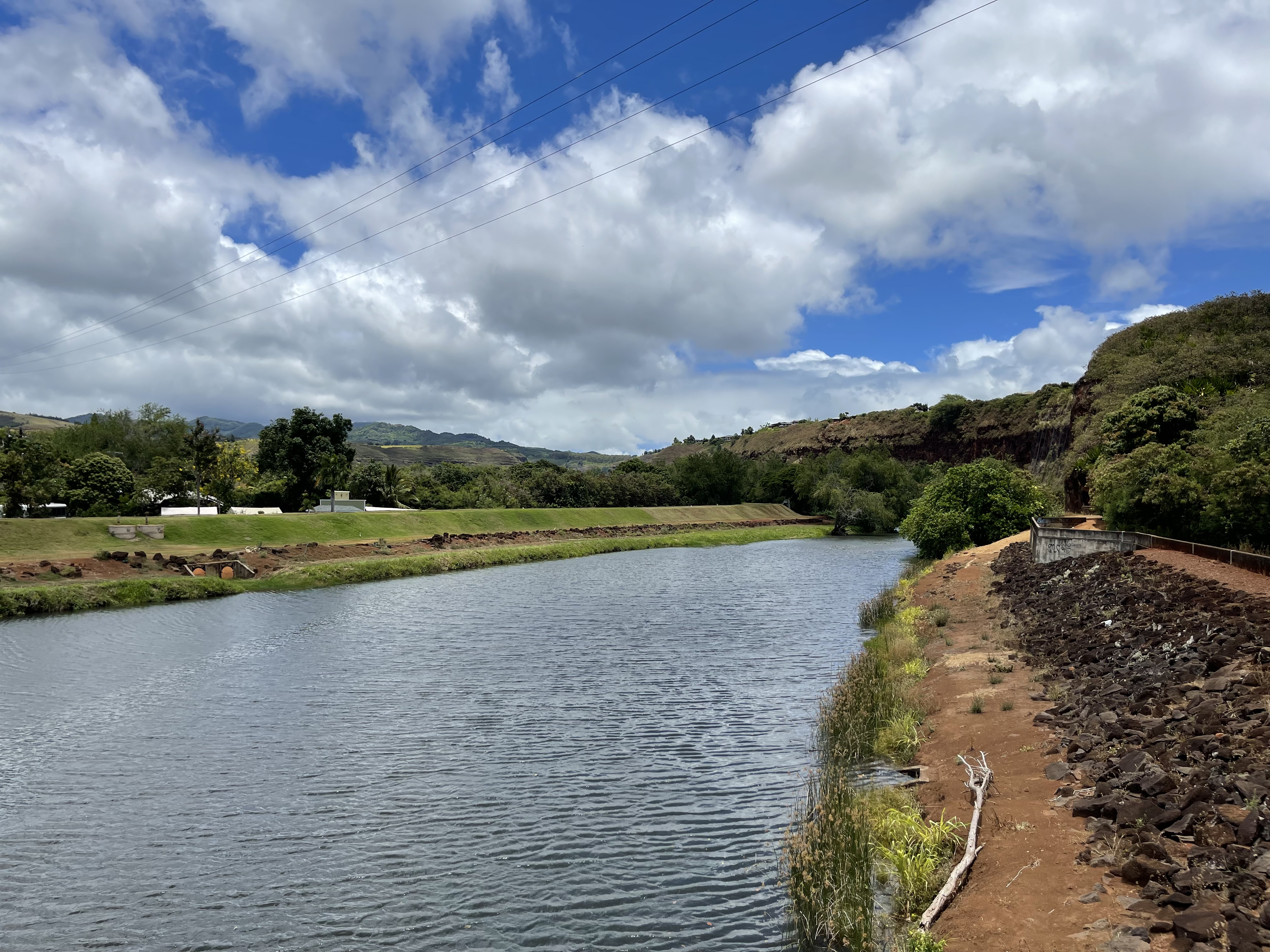
The Hanapēpē River, Kauai, Hawaii

The river drains the fertile Hanapēpē Valley, a region that was historically used for growing rice, taro, coffee, and sugarcane. During the late 19th and early 20th centuries, the valley attracted Chinese, Japanese, Korean, and Filipino immigrant workers, many of whom started their own farms or businesses. More recently, the Hanapēpē Valley was used for filming parts of the 1993 Steven Spielberg film Jurassic Park.

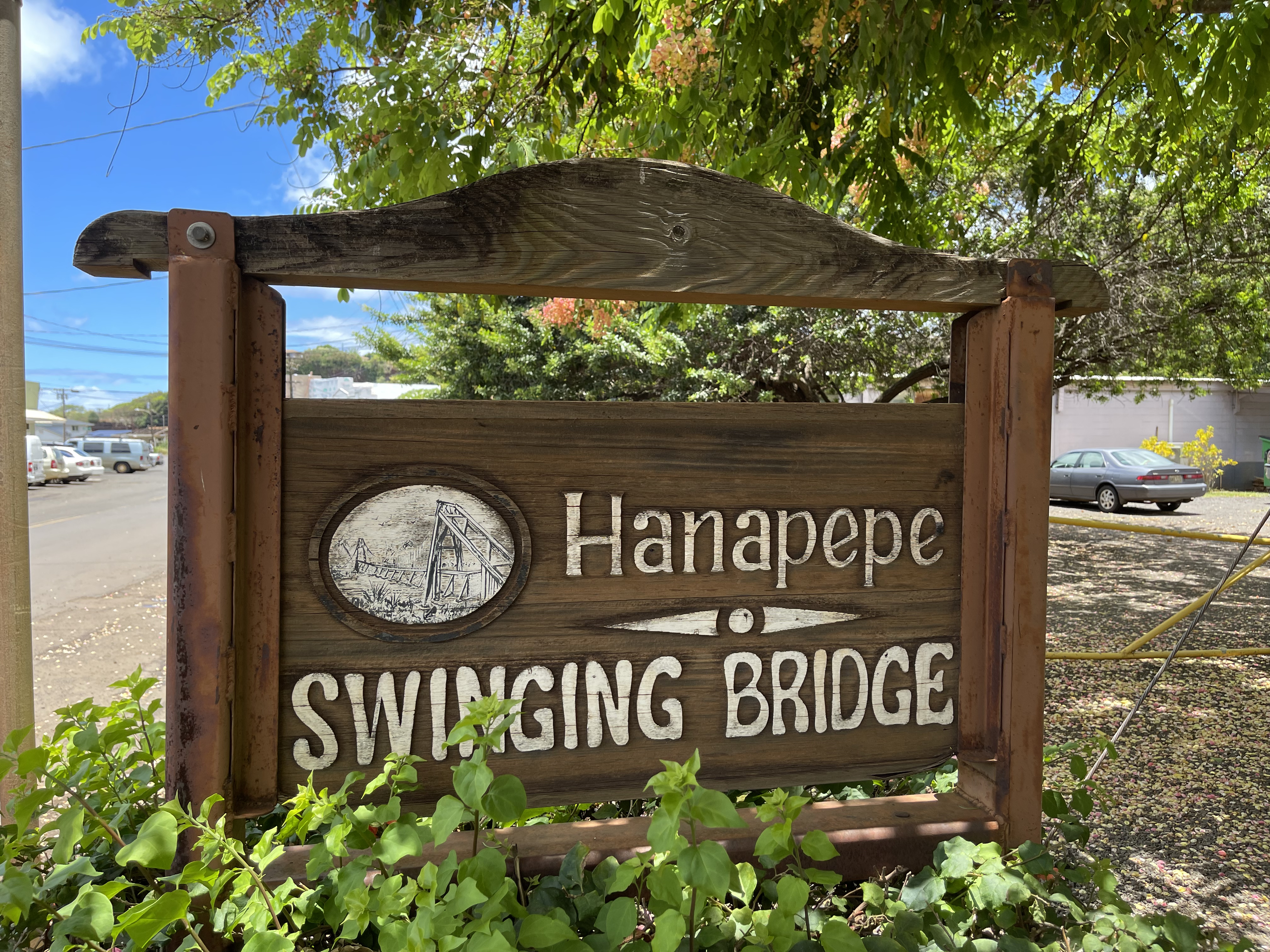
The Hanapēpē Swinging Bridge sign, Hanapēpē, Kauai, Hawaii

Near its mouth in Hanapēpē, the river passes under the Hanapēpē Swinging Bridge. The footbridge was built in 1911 to provide Hanapēpē residents with a way to cross the river, and was restored in 1992 after Hurricane Iniki. Considered a local tourist attraction, the bridge is popular with children due to its tendency to rock back and forth.
