= Roberts Hawaii =

Bus company in Hawaii, United States

Roberts Hawaii Tours and Transport

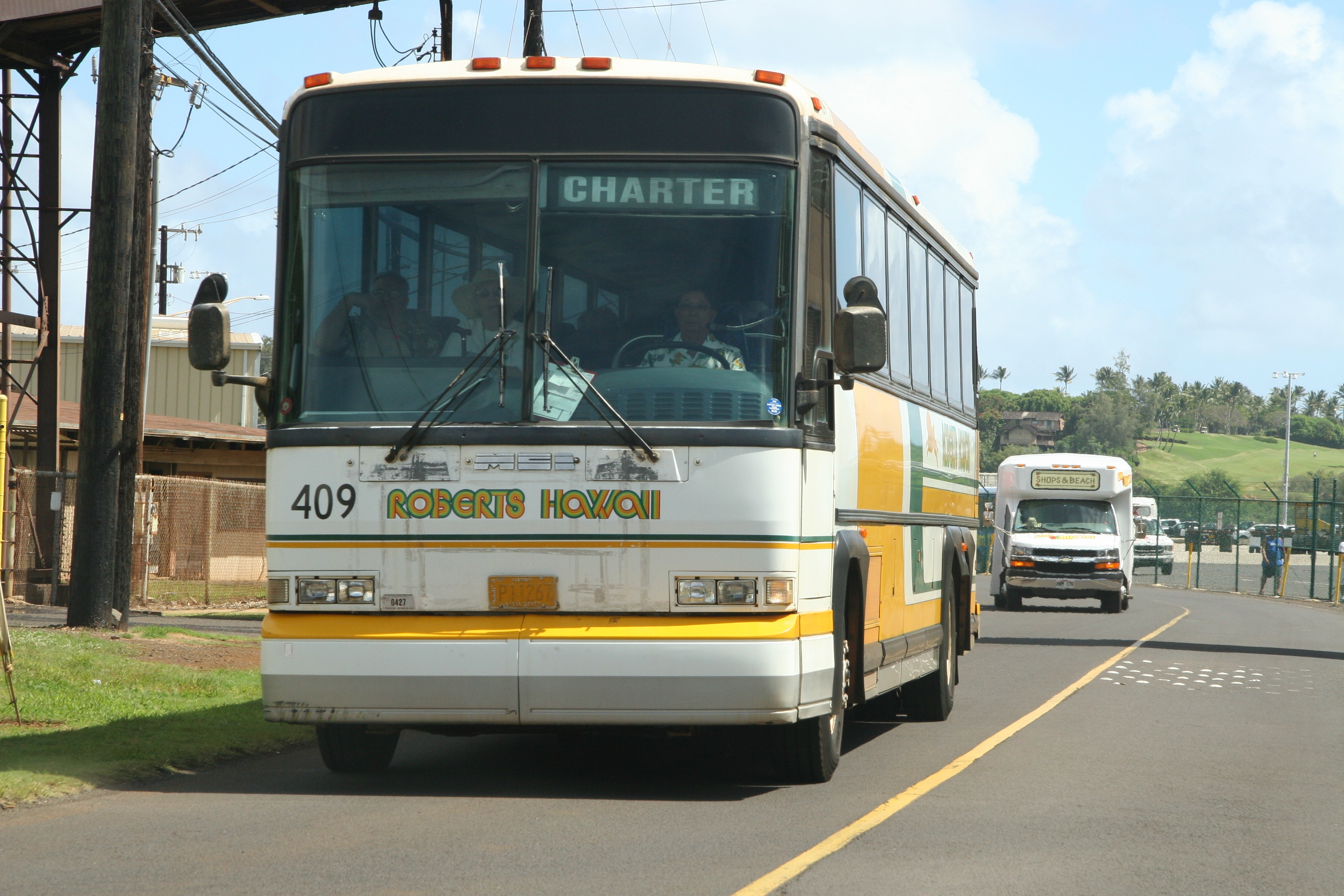
- Headquarters: 680 Iwilei Road, Honolulu, Hawaii
- Service type: Tour bus service, airport shuttle, school bus contractor
- Website: robertshawaii.com

Roberts Hawaii Tours and Transportation is a tour bus operator in the state of Hawaii founded in 1941 by Robert Iwamoto Sr. as a one-man taxi company in Hanapepe, Kauaʻi. It has operations on 4 of Hawaii's major Islands: Kauaʻi, Oʻahu, Maui, and the Island of Hawaiʻi. It has an employee-owned company with 900 vehicles and 1,400 employees.

Roberts Hawaii is also the parent company for the Magic of Polynesia Show, Hawaiian Monarch Hotel, Roberts Hawaii School Bus, and various Hawaii shuttle services.

== History ==
Roberts Hawaii was founded in 1941 by Robert Iwamoto Sr. in Hanapepe, Kauaʻi, as a one-man taxi service. The company expanded into bus transportation in 1950 with the purchase of its first bus, and in 1957 acquired Kauaʻi’s first air-conditioned motorcoach. Under the leadership of Robert Iwamoto Jr., who succeeded his father following his death in 1983, the company expanded beyond Kauaʻi to Oʻahu and later to Maui and Hawaiʻi Island, growing into one of the state’s largest tour and transportation companies.

Roberts Hawaii entered the school bus business in 1981. During the 1990s, the company successfully challenged a rival school bus contractor in litigation over alleged anti-competitive bidding practices, a case that strengthened its position in Hawaii’s student transportation market. By the early 2000s, Roberts Hawaii had become the state’s largest school bus contractor.

In November 2013, Roberts Hawaii School Bus was awarded a contract by the Hawaiʻi State Department of Education to operate 181 of Oʻahu’s 305 school bus routes for the 2014–15 school year.

== Tours and transportation ==
Roberts Hawaii has a fleet of motorcoaches, mini-buses, and vans. Most motorcoaches are made by Prevost Car along with Motor Coach Industries, including Renaissance Coaches (55-60 seats), "DL" Series coaches (55-63 seats), some "D" series coaches (55 seats), Ford-Econoline Minibuses (21-25 seats, and Ford Econoline Passenger vans (11–15 seats). The fleet make-up is similar on every island, since it is impractical to move vehicles between islands.

Roberts Hawaii currently holds transportation contracts for many of Oʻahu's attractions, including Atlantis Submarines & Cruises, Germaine's Luau, USS Missouri, and Hilo Hatties. Tours, especially on the neighbor islands, are narrated by the drivers themselves. In 2013, Roberts Hawaii acquired a $21,000,000 contract with the Hawaii State Department of Education to provide school bus service for 181 of O'ahu's 305 bus routes for the 2014 and 2015 school years.

== Environment ==
In 2009, Roberts Hawaii settled with the Environmental Protection Agency over allegations that the bus company failed to provide annual chemical inventory information to emergency responders, a requirement of facilities that use dangerous chemicals.
