= Kalāheo, Hawaii =

Kalāheo
- Census-designated place
- Location in Kauaʻi County and the state of Hawaii
- Coordinates: 21°55′28″N 159°31′46″W
- Country: United States
- State: Hawaii
- County: Kauaʻi

Area
  - Total: 3.54 sq mi (9.18 km^{2})
  - Land: 3.50 sq mi (9.06 km^{2})
  - Water: 0.042 sq mi (0.11 km^{2})
- Elevation: 682 ft (208 m)

Population (2020)
  - Total: 4,996
  - Density: 1,427.7/sq mi (551.25/km^{2})
- Time zone: UTC-10 (Hawaii-Aleutian)
- ZIP code: 96741
- Area code: 808
- FIPS code: 15-24950
- GNIS feature ID: 0360001

Kalāheo (literally, "the proud day" in Hawaiian) is an unincorporated community and census-designated place (CDP) in Kauaʻi County, island of Kauaʻi, Hawaiʻi, United States. The population was 4,996 at the 2020 census, up from 3,913 at the 2000 census.

The National Tropical Botanical Garden is located in Kalāheo.

== Geography ==
Kalāheo is located on the south side of Kauai at 21°55′28″N 159°31′46″W (21.924430, -159.529358). It is bordered to the east by Lawai. Hawaii Route 50 passes through the community, leading east 12 miles (19 km) to Lihue and west 4 miles (6 km) to Eleele.

According to the United States Census Bureau, the CDP has a total area of 3.6 square miles (9.2 km^{2}), of which 0.04 square miles (0.1 km^{2}), or 1.23%, are water.

== Demographics ==
Historical population
Census	Pop.	Note	%±
2020	4,996		—
U.S. Decennial Census

As of the census of 2000, there were 3,913 people, 1,428 households, and 1,039 families living in the CDP. The population density was 1,328.5 inhabitants per square mile (512.9/km^{2}). There were 1,509 housing units at an average density of 512.3 per square mile (197.8/km^{2}). The racial makeup of the CDP was 40.0% White, 0.2% African American, 0.2% Native American, 29.6% Asian, 3.9% Pacific Islander, 1.2% from other races, and 24.9% from two or more races. Hispanic or Latino of any race were 11.5% of the population.

There were 1,428 households, out of which 32.2% had children under the age of 18 living with them, 57.8% were married couples living together, 10.9% had a female householder with no husband present, and 27.2% were non-families. 20.2% of all households were made up of individuals, and 9.0% had someone living alone who was 65 years of age or older. The average household size was 2.74 and the average family size was 3.18.

In the CDP the population was spread out, with 24.6% under the age of 18, 7.4% from 18 to 24, 26.0% from 25 to 44, 27.2% from 45 to 64, and 14.8% who were 65 years of age or older. The median age was 40 years. For every 100 females, there were 101.0 males. For every 100 females age 18 and over, there were 98.7 males.

The median income for a household in the CDP was $57,813, and the median income for a family was $63,650. Males had a median income of $40,951 versus $31,477 for females. The per capita income for the CDP was $23,501. About 1.5% of families and 2.4% of the population were below the poverty line, including 2.6% of those under age 18 and 1.3% of those age 65 or over.
