= Hanapēpē, Hawaii =

Hanapēpē
- Unincorporated community Census-designated place
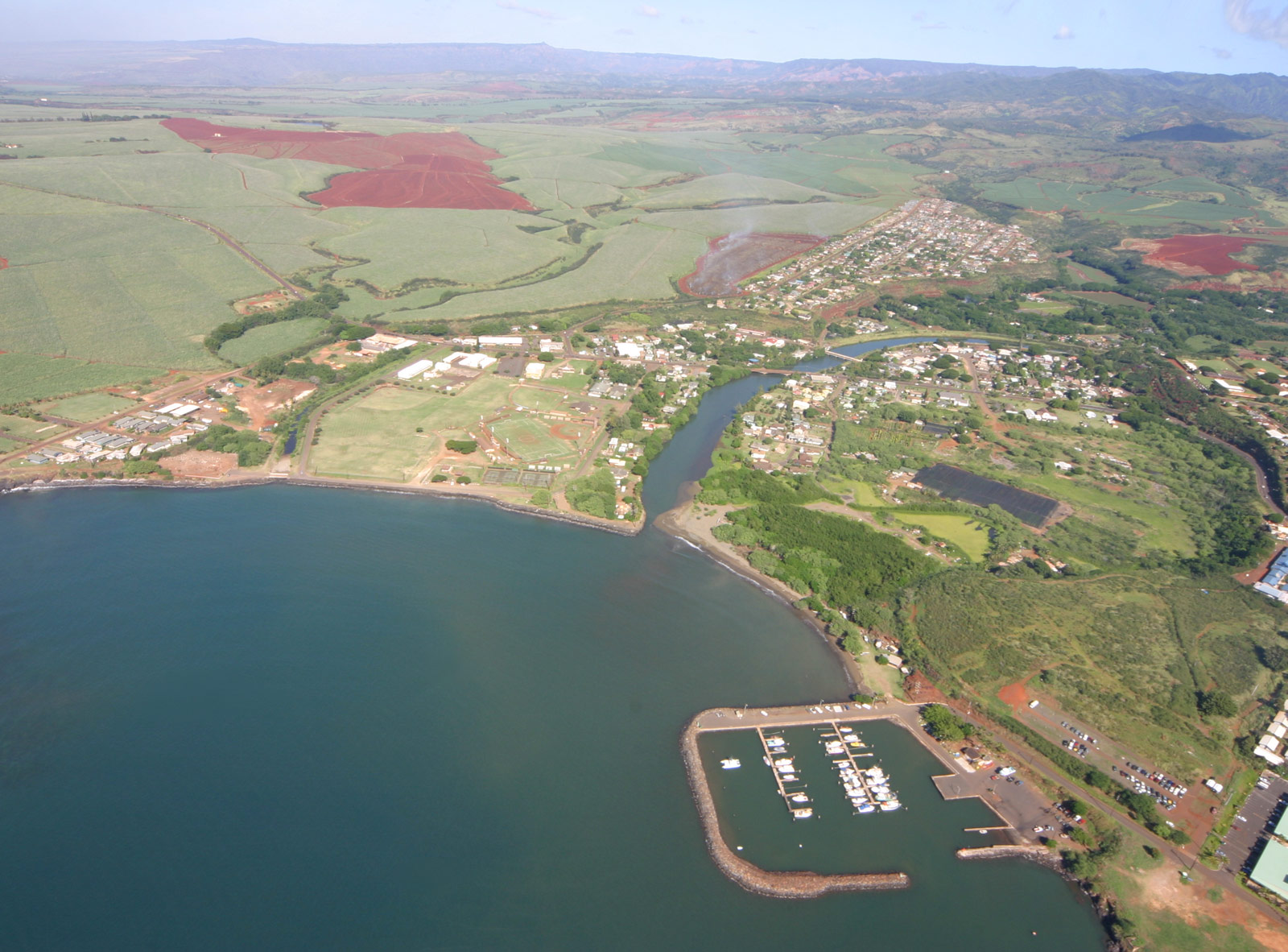
- Aerial view of Hanapepe
- Nickname: Kauaʻi's Biggest Little Town
- Location in Kauaʻi County and the state of Hawaii
- Coordinates: 21°54′59″N 159°35′25″W
- Country: United States
- State: Hawaii
- County: Kauaʻi

Area
  - Total: 1.03 sq mi (2.67 km^{2})
  - Land: 0.93 sq mi (2.42 km^{2})
  - Water: 0.097 sq mi (0.25 km^{2})
- Elevation: 92 ft (28 m)

Population (2020)
  - Total: 2,678
  - Density: 2,866.7/sq mi (1,106.84/km^{2})
- Time zone: UTC−10:00 (Hawaii-Aleutian)
- ZIP Code: 96716
- Area code: 808
- FIPS code: 15-11800
- GNIS feature ID: 0359058

Hanapēpē is an unincorporated community in Kauaʻi County, Hawaii, United States. The name means "crushed bay" in Hawaiian, which may refer to landslides in the area. For statistical purposes, the United States Census Bureau has defined Hanapepe as a census-designated place (CDP). The population was 2,678 at the 2020 census, up from 2,153 at the 2000 census.

== History ==
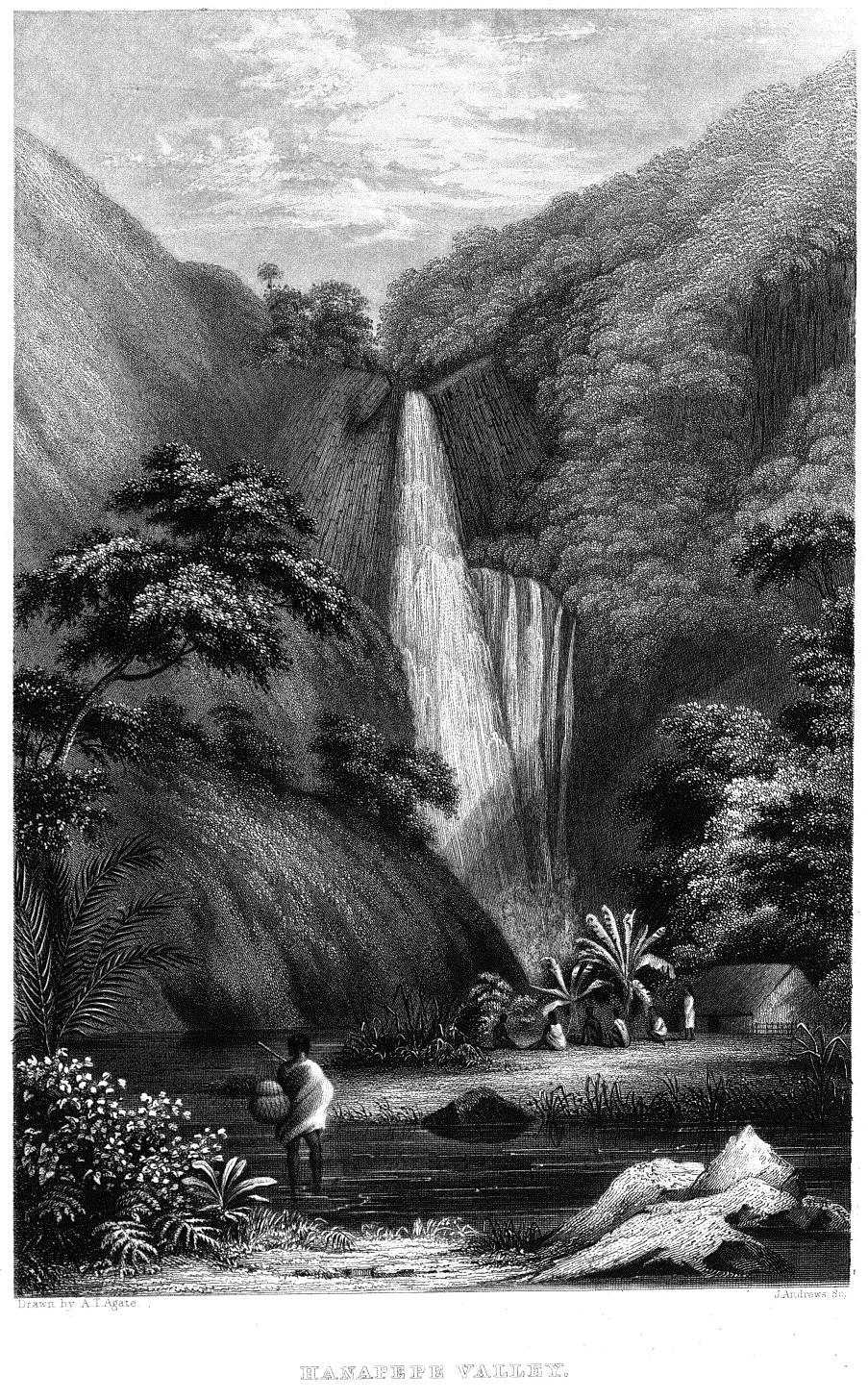
The Hanapēpē Valley as drawn by Alfred Thomas Agate

Hanapēpē was one of the locations visited by the United States Exploring Expedition under Charles Wilkes; the expedition arrived in Hawaii in September 1840 and spent some time in the islands.

Hanapēpē is one of the few towns on Kauai that was not created by sugarcane plantations. In 1924, an armed labor dispute involving sugar workers occurred, ending in the Hanapepe massacre.

== Geography ==
Hanapēpē is on the southern side of the island of Kauaʻi. It is bordered to the east, across the Hanapēpē River and Hanapēpē Bay, by the community of ʻEleʻele. Hawaii Route 50 passes through Hanapepe, leading east 17 miles (27 km) to Līhuʻe and northwest 6 miles (10 km) to Waimea.

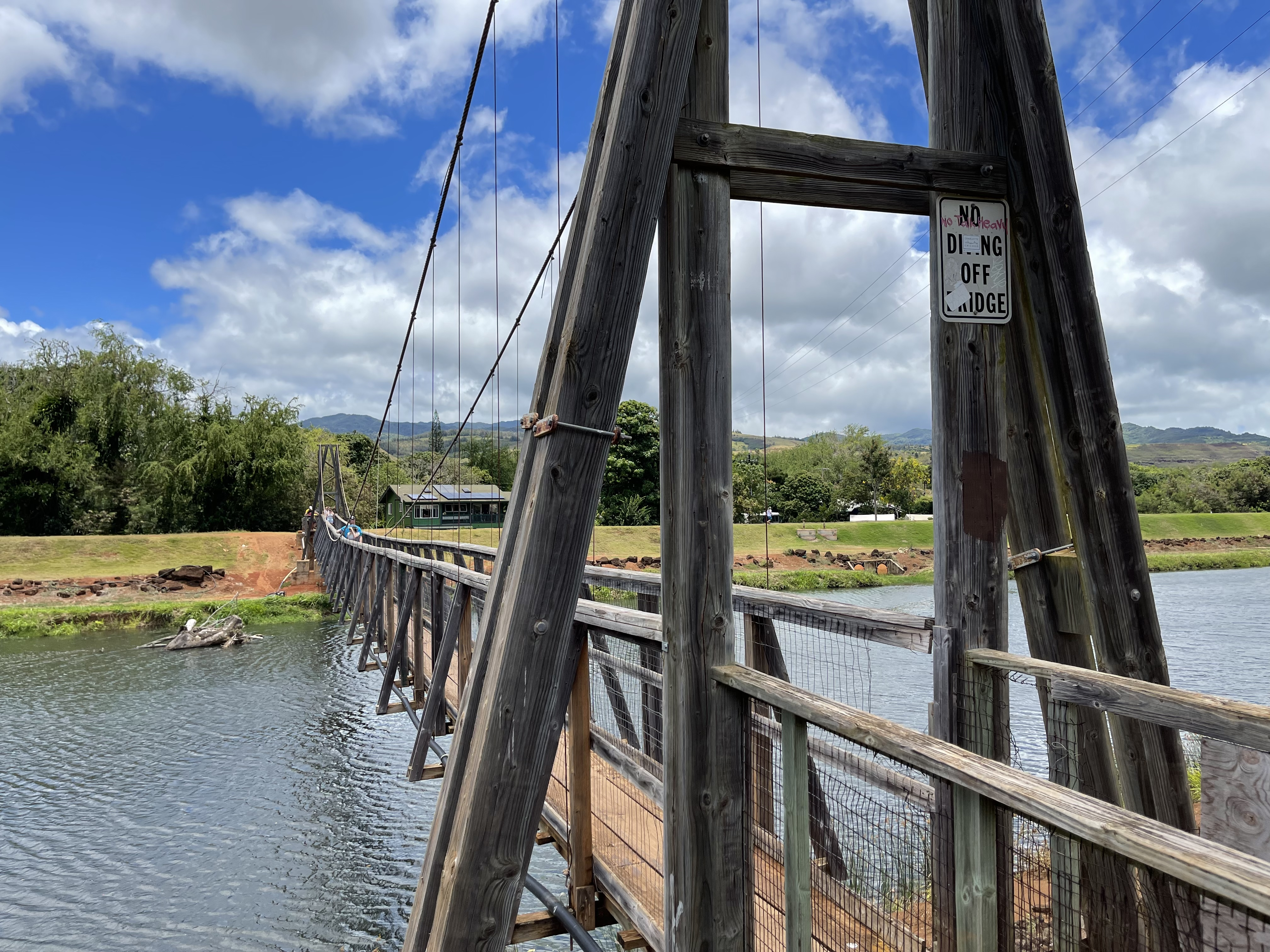
The Hanapēpē Swinging Bridge, Kauaʻi, Hawaii

For statistical purposes, the United States Census Bureau has defined Hanapēpē as a census-designated place (CDP). The census definition of the area may not precisely correspond to local understanding of the area with the same name. The Hanapēpē CDP has an area of 1.0 square mile (2.6 km^{2}), of which 0.93 square miles (2.4 km^{2}) is land, and 0.1 square miles (0.2 km^{2}), or 9.43%, is water.

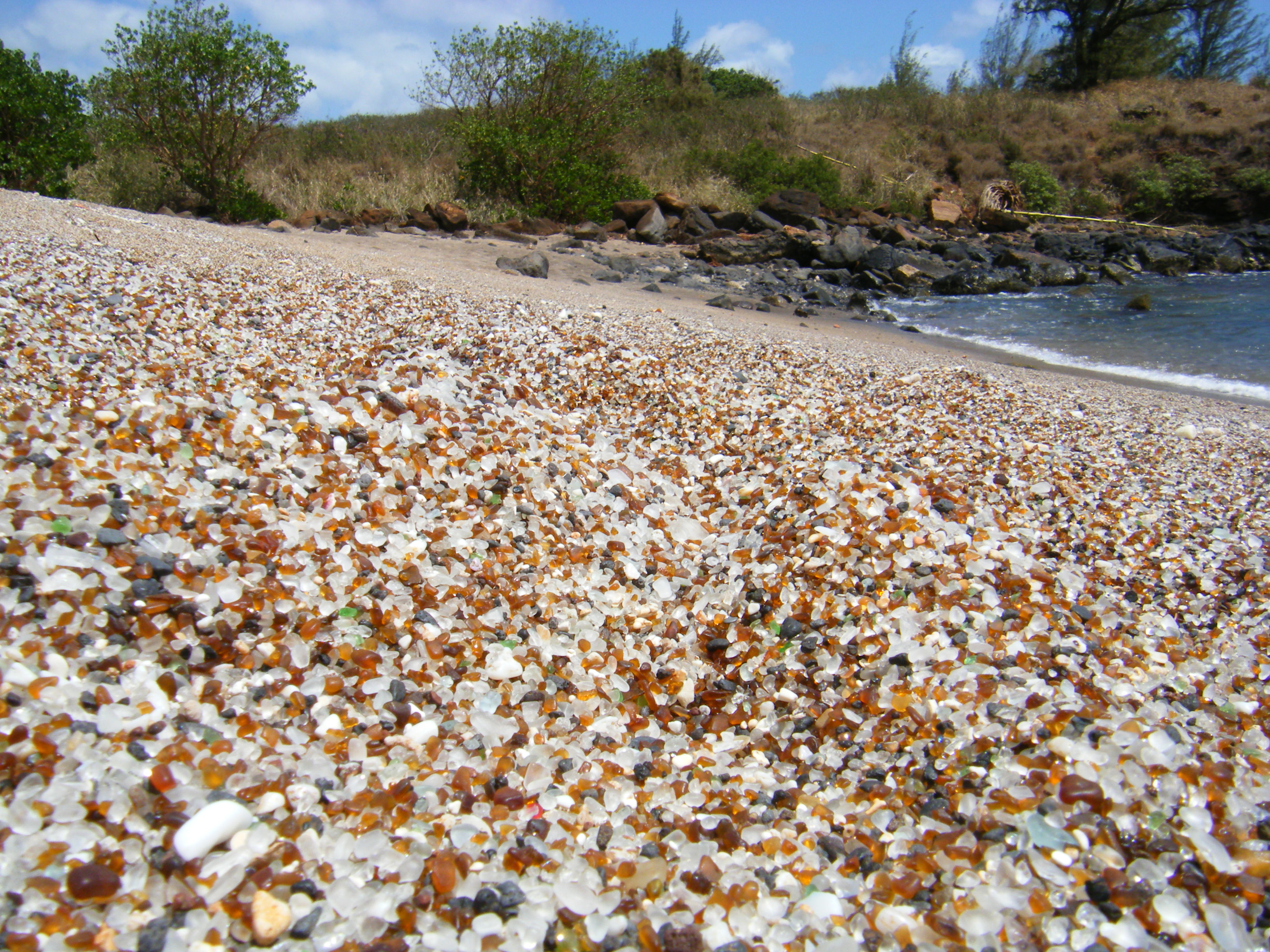
Glass Beach, in the industrial side of Hanapēpē

== Demographics ==
Historical population
Census	Pop.	Note	%±
2020	2,678		—
U.S. Decennial Census

As of the census of 2000, there were 2,153 people, 706 households, and 533 families residing in the CDP. The population density was 2,469.8 inhabitants per square mile (953.6/km^{2}). There were 757 housing units at an average density of 868.4 per square mile (335.3/km^{2}). The racial makeup of the CDP was 16.0% White, 0.1% African American, 0.3% Native American, 48.6% Asian, 8.5% Pacific Islander, 0.2% from other races, and 26.3% from two or more races. Hispanic or Latino of any race were 8.6% of the population.

There were 706 households, out of which 41.8% had children under the age of 18 living with them, 57.2% were married couples living together, 12.3% had a female householder with no husband present, and 24.4% were non-families. 19.8% of all households were made up of individuals, and 8.6% had someone living alone who was 65 years of age or older. The average household size was 3.05 and the average family size was 3.54.

In the CDP the population was spread out, with 32.0% under the age of 18, 6.5% from 18 to 24, 29.4% from 25 to 44, 20.1% from 45 to 64, and 12.1% who were 65 years of age or older. The median age was 35 years. For every 100 females, there were 103.3 males. For every 100 females age 18 and over, there were 98.9 males.

The median income for a household in the CDP was $44,112, and the median income for a family was $50,750. Males had a median income of $30,039 versus $24,224 for females. The per capita income for the CDP was $17,043. About 5.8% of families and 6.6% of the population were below the poverty line, including 7.7% of those under age 18 and 10.8% of those age 65 or over.

== Economy ==
The main street has plantation-style buildings built in the 1930s and ’40s that house art galleries, eateries, and boutiques.

== In popular culture ==
Hanapepe was the inspiration for Kokaua Town, the fictional hometown of the main characters in the Disney animated film Lilo & Stitch and its related franchise (the town was not named until Lilo & Stitch: The Series).

All of the Queensland scenes in 1983's The Thorn Birds were filmed in Kauai, with several scenes shot in Hanapepe.

Hanapepe was the filming location for the Filipino city of Olongapo in Flight of the Intruder.

On August 27, 1980, Douglas Kenney, a co-writer of the film National Lampoon's Animal House, fell 30 feet (9.1 m) to his death from the Hanapepe Lookout.
