= ʻEleʻele, Hawaii =

ʻEleʻele
- Census-designated place
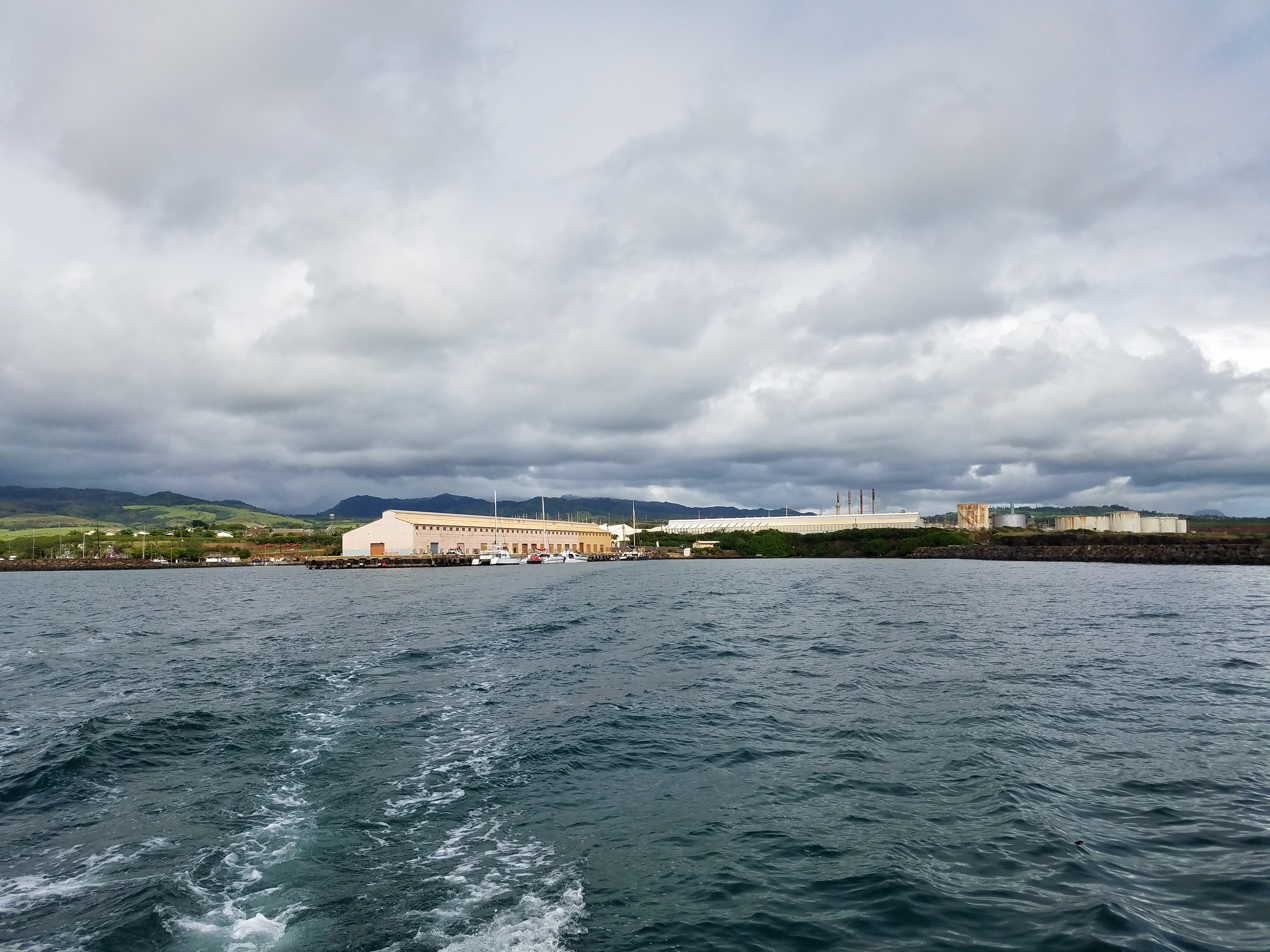
- Port Allen with ʻEleʻele in the background

- Location in Kauaʻi County and the state of Hawaii
- Coordinates: 21°54′38″N 159°35′4″W
- Country: United States
- State: Hawaii
- County: Kauaʻi

Area
  - Total: 1.08 sq mi (2.81 km^{2})
  - Land: 0.78 sq mi (2.01 km^{2})
  - Water: 0.31 sq mi (0.80 km^{2})
- Elevation: 23 ft (7 m)

Population (2020)
  - Total: 2,515
  - Density: 3,244.5/sq mi (1,252.71/km^{2})
- Time zone: UTC-10 (Hawaii-Aleutian)
- ZIP code: 96705
- Area code: 808
- FIPS code: 15-07000
- GNIS feature ID: 0358794

ʻEleʻele (literally, "black" or "black water" in Hawaiian) is a census-designated place (CDP) on the island of Kauaʻi in Kauaʻi County, Hawaiʻi, United States, with the ZIP code of 96705. Glass Beach, that is made of sea glass, is a local attraction. The population was 2,515 at the 2020 census, up from 2,040 at the 2000 census.

== Geography ==
ʻEleʻele is located on the south side of the island of Kauaʻi at 21°54′38″N 159°35′4″W (21.910489, -159.584330). It is bordered to the west by Hanapēpē, with the Hanapēpē River forming the boundary between the two communities. Hawaii Route 50 passes through ʻEleʻele, leading east 4 miles (6 km) to Kalāheo and west 2 miles (3 km) to Kaumakani. Līhuʻe is 17 miles (27 km) to the east via Route 50.

According to the United States Census Bureau, the CDP has a total area of 1.1 square miles (2.8 km^{2}), of which 0.77 square miles (2.0 km^{2}) are land and 0.3 square miles (0.8 km^{2}), or 28.56%, are water. The water area consists of the east side of Hanapēpē Bay.

== Demographics ==
Historical population
Census	Pop.	Note	%±
2020	2,515		—
U.S. Decennial Census

As of the census of 2000, there were 2,040 people, 626 households, and 500 families residing in the CDP. The population density was 2,463.5 people per square mile (951.2 people/km^{2}). There were 652 housing units at an average density of 787.4 per square mile (304.0/km^{2}). The racial makeup of the CDP was 9.5% White, 0.3% African American, 0.1% Native American, 61.8% Asian, 5.3% Pacific Islander, 0.7% from other races, and 22.5% from two or more races. Hispanic or Latino of any race were 8.2% of the population.

There were 626 households, out of which 41.2% had children under the age of 18 living with them, 58.6% were married couples living together, 16.1% had a female householder with no husband present, and 20.1% were non-families. 18.1% of all households were made up of individuals, and 8.6% had someone living alone who was 65 years of age or older. The average household size was 3.26 and the average family size was 3.66.

In the CDP the population was spread out, with 30.0% under the age of 18, 6.6% from 18 to 24, 27.4% from 25 to 44, 19.9% from 45 to 64, and 16.2% who were 65 years of age or older. The median age was 36 years. For every 100 females, there were 95.6 males. For every 100 females age 18 and over, there were 94.4 males.

The median income for a household in the CDP was $46,705, and the median income for a family was $53,047. Males had a median income of $35,500 versus $25,667 for females. The per capita income for the CDP was $15,873. About 9.2% of families and 13.2% of the population were below the poverty line, including 15.9% of those under age 18 and 10.6% of those age 65 or over.

== Climate ==
Tropical savanna climates have monthly mean temperature above 18 °C (64 °F) in every month of the year and typically a pronounced dry season, with the driest month having precipitation less than 60 mm (2.4 in) of precipitation. In essence, a tropical savanna climate tends to either see less rainfall than a tropical monsoon climate or have more pronounced dry seasons than a tropical monsoon climate. The Köppen Climate Classification subtype for this climate is "As". (Tropical Savanna Climate).
