= List of state highways in Hawaii =

- Standard route markers

System information
- Length: 1,013 mi (1,630 km)

Highway names
- Interstates: Interstate Route HX or H-X
- US Highways: Not applicable
- State: Route X

System links
- Routes in Hawaii

The Hawaii Department of Transportation maintains the smallest state-maintained system of state highways in the country. It consists of Interstates, state highways, and secondary state highways, totaling approximately 1,013 miles (1,630 km).

The state's four Interstates, all located on Oahu, are built to mainland standards unlike their counterparts in Alaska and Puerto Rico. The first three routes (H-1, H-2, and H-3) were approved in 1960, while an auxiliary route (H-201) was added in 1989.

== Primary and auxiliary interstates ==
Map of the interstate highway network on the Oahu island in Hawaii

The Interstate Highway System was extended to Hawaii on August 29, 1960, a year after statehood, when the Bureau of Public Roads approved three routes—H-1, H-2, and H-3—for addition to the Interstate network. A fourth route, H-201, was later added in 1989 as an auxiliary designation for part of the Moanalua Freeway.

Unlike most Interstates on the mainland, whose primary purpose is civilian travel and interstate commerce, Hawaii's Interstates were built specifically to serve national defense needs by linking the island's scattered military installations. H-1 connects the Pearl Harbor naval complex and Hickam Air Force Base to a naval ammunition storage facility and the former Fort Ruger base at Diamond Head; H-2 connects to Schofield Barracks and Wheeler Army Airfield; and H-3 connects to Marine Corps Base Hawaii at Kāneʻohe Bay.

H-3 illustrates this defense purpose most directly. It satisfies the national defense purpose of connecting Marine Corps Base Hawaii with the US Navy port at Pearl Harbor via H-1, and opened on December 12, 1997 specifically to connect military personnel stationed across the island, linking the naval base at Pearl Harbor to the Marine Corps base on Oʻahu's northeast coast. Much of the early push for building H-3 came from the military itself, which had faced difficulties moving troops across Oʻahu.

Number	Length (mi)	Length (km)	Southern or western terminus	Northern or eastern terminus	Formed	Removed	Notes
H-1	27.149	43.692	Route 93 in Kapolei	Route 72 in Honolulu	1960	current	
H-2	8.319	13.388	H-1 in Pearl City	Route 99 in Wahiawa	1960	current	
H-3	15.316	24.649	H-1 / H-201 in Halawa	Marine Corps Base Hawaii	1997	current	
H-201	4.075	6.558	H-1 in Halawa	H-1 in Honolulu	1989	current	Was signed as Route 78 until 2004

== Primary and secondary routes ==
The current state (then territorial) highway numbering system was established in 1955. Route numbers are organized so that the initial digit corresponds to the island:

- Numbers beginning with 1 or 2: Hawaiʻi
- Numbers beginning with 3: Maui
- Numbers beginning with 4: Molokai, Lanai
- Numbers beginning with 5: Kauai
- Numbers beginning with 6 to 9: Oahu

In general, two-digit numbers are primary highways, maintained by the state. Three-digit routes are typically secondary arterials or collectors, while four-digit routes are typically collectors and minor roads. For secondary routes, the first two digits generally relate to the associated primary route. Many secondary routes are county-maintained and unsigned, their route numbers being used merely by state agencies as an asset-tracking measure.

When referring to highways, Hawaiʻi residents usually refer to state highways by their names instead of their route numbers (e.g. Kamehameha Highway instead of Route 99). Note that one named highway may encompass several route numbers (e.g. Kamehameha Highway, which carries Routes 80, 83, 99, and 830 at various points along its length) and vice versa.

Number	Length (mi)	Length (km)	Southern or western terminus	Northern or eastern terminus	Formed	Removed	Notes
Route 10	—	—	Māmalahoa Highway (Route 11) south of Kailua-Kona	Hoʻokena	—	—	Possibly unbuilt, shown on 1973 map
Route 11	121.970	196.292	Route 19 / Route 190 in Kailua-Kona	Route 19 in Hilo	1955	current	Volcano Road, Māmalahoa Highway, Kuakini Highway, Queen Kaʻahumanu Highway. Part of the Hawaiʻi Belt Road
Route 12	—	—	Route 11 in Hilo	end of pavement east of Hilo	—	—	Replaced by Route 120 (now Route 1370 and Route 137)
Route 13	—	—	Wahaʻula Heiau	Route 11 in Keaʻau	1955	—	Replaced by Route 130
Route 15	—	—	Route 11 in Pāhala	Route 11 in Pāhala	—	—	Maile Street and Kamahi Street: Signed as Route 15 but designated as Federal-aid Route 150; apparently removed from the federal-aid system in the mid-1960s
Route 16	—	—	Route 11 in Kēōkea	Route 11 in Captain Cook	—	—	Became Route 160 (or County Route 160)
Route 18	11.1	17.9	Route 11 in Honalo	Route 19 in Palani Junction	1955	—	Downgraded to County Route 180
Route 19	99.490	160.114	Route 11 / Route 190 in Kailua-Kona	Port of Hilo	1955	current	Bay Front Highway, Hawaiʻi Belt Road, Māmalahoa Highway, Queen Kaʻahumanu Highway
Route 20	—	—	Route 19 south of Waimea	Route 19 in Hilo	1955	—	Replaced by Route 200 and County Route 200
Route 21	1.8	2.9	Route 20 in Hilo	Route 19 in Hilo	1955	—	Downgraded to county road; now Wainaku Street
Route 22	3.7	6.0	ʻAkaka Falls State Park	Route 19 in Honomū	1955	—	Replaced by Route 220
Route 24	—	—	Waipiʻo Valley Road	Route 19 southeast of Honokaʻa	—	—	Replaced by Route 240
Route 25	—	—	Route 19 in Waimea	Route 27 in Hāwī	—	—	Replaced by Route 250 (portions now Route 19)
Route 26	—	—	Kawaihae	Route 25 near Waimea	—	—	Replaced by Route 19 and Route 270
Route 27	—	—	west of Hāwī	Pololū Valley Lookout	—	—	Replaced by Route 270
Route 27A	—	—	Route 270	Route 19	—	—	only shown in 1985-1986 Gousha road atlases
Route 30	41.615	66.973	Route 32 in Wailuku	Route 340 near Kapalua	1955	current	High Street, Honoapiʻilani Highway
Route 31	7.149	11.505	Wailea Ike Drive in Kīhei	Route 310 / Route 311 in Kīhei	1955	current	Piʻilani Highway
Route 32	2.848	4.583	Route 30 / Route 320 in Wailuku	Route 32A in Kahului	1955	current	West Main Street, Kaʻahumanu Avenue
Route 32A	0.393	0.632	Route 36 in Kahului	Gate at pier 1 at Kahului Harbor	—	—	Hobron Avenue: Former Route 361
Route 32B	0.168	0.270	Route 32 in Kahului	Parking lot at pier 2 at Kahului Harbor	—	—	Wharf Street: Unsigned
Route 33	0.5	0.80	Route 32 in Wailuku	Route 330 in Wailuku	1955	—	Downgraded to an extension of County Route 330
Route 34	0.5	0.80	Koa Drive in Wailuku	Route 32 in Wailuku	1955	—	One section became Route 3400, remainder became county roads
Route 35	7.6	12.2	Route 31 in Kīhei	Route 32 in Kahului	1955	—	Replaced by Route 350
Route 36	16.214	26.094	Route 32 in Kahului	Route 360 / Route 365 near Haʻikū	1955	current	Hāna Highway: Originally ran to Route 31, but this section became Route 360
Route 36A	0.506	0.814	Route 36 in Kahului	Airport Road in Kahului	—	—	Haleakalā Highway, Keolani Place: Was a portion of Federal-aid route 37; originally signed as Route 396
Route 37	21.344	34.350	Route 31 near Kula	Route 36 in Kahului	1955	current	Haleakalā Highway, Kula Highway
Route 38	6.2	10.0	Route 30 in Māʻalaea	Route 36 in Kahului	1955	—	Replaced by Route 380 and County Route 390
Route 39	12.4	20.0	Route 36 in Pāʻia	Waihou Spring Forest Reserve	1955	—	Downgraded to Route 390
Route 40	1.3	2.1	Route 30 in Waikapū	Route 38 near Waikapū	1955	—	Downgraded to County Route 305
Route 44	8.8	14.2	Route 442 in Lānaʻi City	Kahokunui	1955	—	Western section became County Route 430
Route 45	27.5	44.3	Route 46 in Kaunakakai	Hālawa	1955	—	Replaced by Route 450
Route 46	16.6	26.7	Maunaloa Road in Maunaloa	Kaunakakai Wharf	1955	—	Replaced by Route 460
Route 47	5.8	9.3	Route 46 in Kualapuʻu	Palaʻau State Park	1955	—	Replaced by Route 470
Route 48	5.2	8.4	Anahaki Road in Hoʻolehua	Route 47 in Kualapuʻu	1955	—	Partially replaced by Route 480; remainder now an unnumbered road
Route 50	32.920	52.980	Pacific Missile Range Facility	Route 56 in Līhuʻe	1955	current	Kaumualiʻi Highway: Section along Rice Street became Route 51
Route 51	3.452	5.555	Route 58 in Līhuʻe	Route 56 in Līhuʻe	1955	current	Waʻapa Road, Rice Street, Kapule Highway: Former portion of Route 50
Route 52	—	—	—	—	—	—	Downgraded to County Route 520
Route 53	—	—	—	—	—	—	Downgraded to County Route 530
Route 54	—	—	—	—	—	—	Replaced by Route 540
Route 55	20.7	33.3	Route 50 in Kekaha	Route 56 in Wainiha	1955	—	Replaced by Route 550 and county roads
Route 56	28.120	45.255	Route 50 in Līhuʻe	Route 560 in Princeville	1955	current	Kūhiō Highway: much of route possibly former Route 560; Kalihiwai bypassed in 1963, Koʻolau bypassed in 1965 and Kilauea bypassed in 1973
Route 57	1.1	1.8	Route 56 in Līhuʻe	Līhuʻe Airport	1955	—	Replaced by Route 570
Route 58	2.047	3.294	Route 50 in Līhuʻe	Route 51 near Nāwiliwili Harbor	—	—	Nāwiliwili Road: Originally designated as Route 501
Route 58	—	—	—	—	—	—	Replaced by Route 580
Route 61	10.586	17.037	Route 6001 / Route 6010 in Kailua	Route 98 in Honolulu	1962	current	Pali Highway, Kailua Road: Originally planned to begin at Route 92
Route 62	—	—	Route 92 in Honolulu	Route 90	—	—	Waiakamilo Street: Appears on 1962 state route map and 1969-1970 street maps; deleted after 1967
Route 63	8.299	13.356	Route 92 in Honolulu	Route 83 / Route 830 in Kāneʻohe	—	—	Kalihi Street, Likelike Highway
Route 64	2.605	4.192	Route 92 in Honolulu	Entrance to Sand Island State Recreation Area	—	—	Sand Island Access Road: Possible former Route 640
Route 65	4.148	6.676	Mōkapu Boulevard/Kāneʻohe Bay Drive/North Kalaheo Avenue	Route 83 / Route 830 in Kāneʻohe	—	—	Kāneʻohe Bay Drive, Mōkapu Saddle Road, Mōkapu Blvd: Much of the route was formerly Route 63 (later Route 630)
Route 66	—	—	—	—	—	—	One section became Route 7310; remainder removed
Route 67	—	—	Route 92 (Nimitz Highway) near Honolulu International Airport	Route 99 (Kamehameha Highway) near Aloha Stadium	—	—	Former County Route 670; deleted sometime after 1973
Route 68	—	—	Route 92 (under H-1 viaduct)	Passenger terminals at Honolulu International Airport	—	—	Appears on 1961 state route map and 1967 Hawaii DOT planning document that recommended its transfer to county jurisdiction, but as an unnumbered county route
Route 69	—	—	Route 92 (under H-1 viaduct)	End of street in Honolulu International Airport cargo facilities area	—	—	Appears on 1961 state route map and 1967 Hawaii DOT planning document that recommended its transfer to county jurisdiction, but as an unnumbered county route
Route 71	—	—	Route 99 (then Route 90)	H-201 (then Route 72)	—	—	One section became Route 7241; remainder gone (covered over by Aloha Stadium); appears on 1962 state route map, 1967 Hawaii DOT planning document (as Route 710) and street maps up to at least 1973, but gone by 1975
Route 72	18.430	29.660	Route 61 in Maunawili	H-1 in East Honolulu	—	—	Kalanianaʻole Highway: Originally ran to near Route 99; much of that section became H-1 and H-201
Route 73	—	—	Entrance to Naval facilities in Pearl Harbor	End of road at Ewa Forest Preserve	—	—	One portion former County Route 730
Route 75	—	—	—	—	—	—	replaced by Route 750 and part of Route 76
Route 76	6.617	10.649	H-1 / Route 750 interchange at Waipahu	Ewa Beach Park at ʻEwa Beach	—	—	Fort Weaver Road, Kunia Road
Route 78	0.739	1.189	—	—	—	—	Moanalua Freeway: Former portion of Route 72; most of the route signed over H-201 until 2004; section from Route 99 to western H-1 interchange still signed as Route 78
Route 80	1.890	3.042	H-1 / Route 99 in Wahiawā	Route 99 in Wahiawā	—	—	Part of the Kamehameha Highway
Route 82	—	—	Route 99/Route 83/Route 930 at Weed Circle south of Haleiwa	Route 930 in Mokuleia	—	—	Became a portion of Route 99
Route 83	43.904	70.657	Route 83 / Route 930 in Haleʻiwa	Route 61 in Maunawili	—	—	Kamehameha Highway, JP Leong Highway, Kahekili Highway, Likelike Highway: one section was part of Route 63
Route 90	—	—	Liliha Street (Route 7413)	Farrington Highway (Route 93)	—	—	Dillingham Boulevard, Farrington Highway (southern segment), Old Farrington Highway: Became Route 76, Route 93, Route 99, Route 7101 and Route 7110; segment along Farrington Highway shown as Route 7901 on a 2002 map, but this is inconsistent with official state records
Route 92	9.279	14.933	JB Pearl Harbor–Hickam	Kalākaua Avenue in Honolulu	—	—	Kamehameha Highway, Nimitz Highway, Ala Moana Boulevard: East portion was formerly Route 920 (later Federal-aid route 1092B)
Route 93	19.524	31.421	H-1 at Ko Olina	Kaʻena Point State Park	—	—	Farrington Highway: Former Route 90
Route 95	—	—	H-1/Route 98	Route 92 in Honolulu	—	—	Proposed (1968) but never built; appears on a 1968 planning map as "pending approval by U.S. Bureau of Public Roads" in a failed attempt for approval of a new Interstate H-4 through downtown Honolulu
Route 95	2.7	4.3	Barbers Point Harbor	H-1	—	—	Possibly a portion of former Route 950
Route 97	—	—	—	—	—	—	replaced by Route 7413
Route 98	1.758	2.829	H-1 in Honolulu	H-1 in Honolulu	—	—	Vineyard Boulevard: Former portion of Route 72
Route 99	23.842	38.370	H-1 in Honolulu	Route 83 / Route 930 in Haleʻiwa	—	—	Kamehameha Highway, Kamananui Road, Wilikina Drive, Farrington Highway: Former portions of Route 82, Route 90 and Route 741
Route 120	—	—	Route 11 in Hilo	end of pavement east of Hilo	—	—	Former Route 12; was proposed to continue east and southwest via Puainako Street
Route 120	—	—	Kalanianaʻole Street (now County Route 137)	Route 11	—	—	Proposed tsunami escape route; appeared in 1961 planning document
Route 121	1.658	2.668	Volcano Road (Route 11) in Mountain View	Huina Road in Mountain View	—	—	North Kulani Road
Route 123	—	—	Route 200	Komohana Street	—	—	replaced by Route 2000
Route 130	21.639	34.825	Volcano Road (Route 11) in Keaʻau	near Kaimū	—	—	Keaʻau-Pāhoa Road, Pāhoa-Kalapana Road: Much of route former Route 13; originally traveled further southwest to Chain of Craters Road, but this section closed in 1986 due to lava flows
Route 134	1.493	2.403	Keaʻau-Pāhoa Road (Route 130)	Pāhoa Kalapana Road (through Pāhoa town)	—	—	Pāhoa Village Road
Route 135	4.545	7.314	Pāhoa-Kapoho Road (Route 132)	Kalapana Road-Kapoho Road (Route 137)	—	—	Pohoiki Road
Route 138	5.925	9.535	Keaʻau-Pāhoa Road (Route 130)	Papio Street	—	—	Kahakai Boulevard
Route 139	1.185	1.907	Volcano Road (Route 11)	Keaʻau-Pāhoa Road (Route 130)	1999	current	Old Keaʻau-Pāhoa Road: Former portion of Route 13 (and later Route 130)
Route 144	—	—	Route 11 in Mountain View	Route 11 at Hawaiʻi Volcanoes National Park	1956	c. 1963	Designated when Route 22 was proposed to bypass this section; the bypass was never built, and was cancelled by 1963, so this road became part of Route 11 again
Route 151	—	—	Maile Street (Route 15) in Pāhala	End of pavement	—	—	now Pīkake Street and Wood Valley Drive
Route 155	3.972	6.392	South Point Access Road (Route 150)	Māmalahoa Highway (Route 11), Nāʻālehu	—	—	Kamaoa Road
Route 160	3.819	6.146	Puʻuhonua o Hōnaunau National Historical Park access road / County Route 160	Route 11 in Kēōkea	—	—	Ke Ala o Keawe Road: Former Route 16
Route 161	4.396	7.075	Puʻuhonua Road	Māmalahoa Highway (Route 11)	—	—	Nāpoʻopoʻo Road
Route 163	0.131	0.211	Ke Ala o Keawe Road	Parking lot entrance	—	—	Ke Ala o Keawe Road (City of Refuge spur)
Route 164	0.260	0.418	Mamao Street	Māmalahoa Highway (Route 11), Kealakekua	—	—	Halekiʻi Street
Route 184	0.326	0.525	Marlin Road	Kuakini Highway (Route 11), Kailua-Kona	—	—	Sunset Drive
Route 186	7.060	11.362	Kuakini Highway (Route 11), Kailua-Kona	Māmalahoa Bypass	—	—	Palani Road, Aliʻi Drive
Route 187	0.60	0.97	Akoni Drive	Kuakini Highway (Route 11), Kailua-Kona	—	—	Walua Road
Route 188	1.293	2.081	Aliʻi Drive (Route 186)	Queen Kaʻahumanu Highway (Route 11)	—	—	Hualālai Road
Route 189	0.253	0.407	Ehukai Street	Aliʻi Drive (Route 186), Kailua-Kona	—	—	Kaleiopapa Road
Route 190	38.970	62.716	Route 19 in Kailua-Kona	Route 19 in Waimea	—	—	Māmalahoa Highway: Former Route 16; part of the Hawaiʻi Belt Road
Route 191	11.933	19.204	Queen Kaʻahumanu Highway (Route 19), Puakō	Māmalahoa Highway (Route 190)	—	—	Waikōloa Road
Route 192	3.570	5.745	Queen Kaʻahumanu Highway (Route 19), Kailua-Kona	Māmalahoa Highway (Route 190)	—	—	Hina Lani Street
Route 196	1.670	2.688	Waikōloa Road (Route 191), Waikōloa Village	Hoʻoko Street	—	—	Paniolo Avenue
Route 197	3.10	4.99	Queen Kaʻahumanu Highway (Route 19) north of Kailua-Kona	Palani Road (Route 190)	—	—	Kealakehe Parkway
Route 198	3.630	5.842	Queen Kaʻahumanu Highway (Route 19), Kailua-Kona	Māmalahoa Highway (Route 190)	—	—	Kaʻiminani Drive
Route 200	43.224	69.562	Route 190 south of Waimea	Route 19 in Hilo	—	—	Saddle Road: proposed to extended west to Route 19
Route 201	—	—	Route 190 south of Waimea	Route 200 south of Waimea	—	—	became part of Route 200; this section was bypassed in 2013
Route 201	0.4	0.64	Hanapepe Bay	Route 50 at Port Allen/ʻEleʻele	—	—	
Route 210	6.39	10.28	Saddle Road (state highway 200) at Pu'u Huluhulu	Mauna Kea visitor Center	—		Unsigned
Route 211	—	—	Route 19 near Hilo	Honoliʻi Cove	—	—	now Honoliʻi Place; was proposed to continue south 0.3 miles from its terminus, but that was never built
Route 220	3.762	6.054	Parking lot in ʻAkaka Falls State Park	Hawaiʻi Belt Road (Route 19)	—	—	Honomu Road, Old Māmalahoa Highway, ʻAkaka Falls Road: Former Route 22
Route 222	0.802	1.291	Hawaiʻi Belt Road (Route 19)	Hawaiʻi Belt Road (Route 19)	—	—	Old Māmalahoa Highway
Route 226	—	—	Kauniho Homesteads	Route 19 (now Old Māmalahoa Highway) near Hakalau	—	—	now Lepoloa Road; shown in 1969-1971 maps as well as early to mid 1960s DOT planning documents
Route 227	0.661	1.064	Hawaiʻi Belt Road (Route 19), Honokaʻa	Mamane Street (Route 240)	—	—	Lehua Street, Plumeria Street
Route 228	0.408	0.657	Hawaiʻi Belt Road (Route 19), Honokaʻa	ʻŌhiʻa Street	—	—	Pīkake Street
Route 232	—	—	Route 19	Ōʻōkala	—	—	Former alignment of Route 19; road continues east back to Route 19
Route 240	9.593	15.438	Waipiʻo Valley Road	Route 19 southeast of Honokaʻa	—	—	Honokaʻa-Waipiʻo Road: Former portion of Route 24
Route 250	19.276	31.022	Route 19 near Waimea	Route 270 in Hawi	—	—	Kohala Mountain Road: Former Route 25; original route to Waimea now part of Route 19
Route 269	—	—	Kawaihae Harbor	Route 26	—	—	now Kawaihae Harbor Road
Route 270	27.003	43.457	Route 19 near Kawaihae	Pololū Valley Lookout	—	—	ʻAkoni Pule Highway: Former Route 26 and possibly Route 27; initially planned as an extension of Route 11
Route 271	—	—	ʻUpolu Airport	Route 270 near Hāwī	—	—	Now ʻUpolu Point Road; deleted in the late 1960s
Route 272	2.320	3.734	Kohala Mountain Road (Route 250)	ʻAkoni Pule Highway (Route 270)	—	—	Kynnersley Road
Route 300	—	—	—	—	—	—	Became a portion of Route 30
Route 303	0.800	1.287	Honoapiʻilani Highway (Route 30)	Lāhaina Bypass (Route 3000)	—	—	Puʻukoliʻi Road
Route 310	—	—	—	—	—	—	became part of Route 36, now Route 360
Route 310	3.590	5.778	Honoapiʻilani Highway (Route 30)	Mokulele Highway (Route 311)	—	—	North Kīhei Road, former portion of Route 31
Route 311	—	—	—	—	—	—	became part of Route 32; this section is now part of County Route 320
Route 311	6.405	10.308	Piʻilani Highway (Route 31 / Route 310) in Kīhei	Kuihelani Highway (Route 380 / Route 3500) in Kahului	—	—	Puʻunēnē Avenue, Mokulele Highway
Route 340	13.819	22.240	Waiehu Beach Road (County Route 330 / Route 3400) in Wailuku	County Route 340 at Camp Maluhia	—	—	Kahekili Highway: Former Route 33 or Route 34; one section became Route 3400
Route 341	—	—	—	—	—	—	Former Route 34, became Route 3400
Route 350	—	—	—	—	—	—	Former Route 35, became Route 311 and Route 3500
Route 360	34.828	56.050	Kaupakalua Road (Route 365)	Wharf at Hāna Bay	—	—	Hāna Highway, Keawa Place
Route 374	—	—	Piʻilani Highway (Route 31) in Kīhei	Haleakalā Highway (Route 37) / Haliʻimalie Road (Route 371) west of Pukalani	proposed	—	Kīhei-Upcountry Maui Highway
Route 377	9.137	14.705	Kula Highway (Route 37)	Kula Highway (Route 37)	—	—	Haleakalā Highway, Kekaulike Avenue
Route 378	10.099	16.253	Haleakalā Highway (Route 377)	Haleakalā National Park boundary	—	—	Haleakalā Crater Road
Route 380	6.171	9.931	Honoapiʻilani Highway (Route 30) north of Māʻalaea Harbor	Haleakalā Highway (Route 36A) / Route 37 in Kahului	—	—	Dairy Road, Kuihelani Highway: Former portion of Route 38
Route 396	—	—	—	—	—	—	Became a portion of Route 380; now part of Route 36A
Route 440	13.168	21.192	Kaumalapau Harbor	Hulopoʻe Beach Park	—	—	Kaumalapau Highway, Manele Road: Former portion of Route 44 and former County Route 441
Route 441	0.471	0.758	Lānaʻi Airport	Kaumalapau Highway (Route 440)	—	—	Airport Road: Former County Route 443 and Route 440C, possibly unsigned
Route 450	27.499	44.255	Ala Mālama Avenue in Kaunakakai	End of pavement at Hālawa Park	—	—	Kamehameha V Highway: Former Route 45
Route 460	16.547	26.630	Maunaloa Road in Maunaloa	Kaunakakai Wharf	—	—	Kaunakai Place, Maunaloa Highway: Former portion of Route 46
Route 465	—	—	Maunaloa Highway (Route 460) west of Molokaʻi Airport	Maunaloa Highway (Route 460) east of Molokaʻi Airport	—	2015	Airport Loop Road; returned to local jurisdiction
Route 470	5.777	9.297	Maunaloa Highway (Route 460) in Kualapuu	Kalaupapa lookout in Palaʻau State Park	—	—	Kalaʻe Highway: Former portion of Route 47
Route 480	3.661	5.892	Maunaloa Highway (Route 460) near Hoʻolehua	Kalaʻe Highway (Route 470) in Kualapuʻu	—	—	Farrington Avenue, Puʻupeʻelua Avenue: Former Route 48 and Route 481
Route 481	—	—	Maunaloa Highway (Route 460)	Puu Kapele Avenue (Route 482)	—	—	Section between Route 460 and Route 480 became a portion of Route 480 and remainder unnumbered
Route 482	—	—	—	—	—	—	Puu Kapele Avenue and Lihi Pali Avenue: Became County Route 475
Route 501	—	—	—	—	—	—	Replaced by Route 58
Route 510	—	—	—	—	—	—	Renumbered to a portion of Route 51, possibly upon completion of route
Route 520	6.35	10.22	Kaumualiʻi Highway (Route 50)	Ala Kinoiki Way (Route 522) and Peʻe Road	—	—	Maluhia Road, Poʻipū Road
Route 521	2.104	3.386	Kaumualiʻi Highway (Route 50)	Kōloa Road (Route 530)	—	—	Omao Road
Route 522	3.311	5.329	Poʻipū Road (Route 520)	Kōloa Road (Route 530)	—	—	Ala Kinoiki Way
Route 523	2.35	3.78	Poʻipū Road (Route 520)	Gate/End of state highway	—	—	Lawai Road
Route 525	0.652	1.049	Kōloa Road (Route 526)	Ala Kinoiki Way (Route 522)	—	—	Weliweli Road
Route 526	0.728	1.172	Maluhia Road (Route 520)	Poʻipū Road (Route 520)	—	—	Kōloa Road, Waikomo Road
Route 530	3.43	5.52	Kaumualiʻi Highway (Route 50)	Poʻipū Road (Route 520)	—	—	Kōloa Road
Route 531	1.206	1.941	Kaumualiʻi Highway (Route 50)	Waha Road (Route 532)	—	—	Pāpālina Road
Route 532	2.41	3.88	Niho Road	Kōloa Road (Route 530)	—	—	Waha Road, Lauoho Road
Route 534	1.416	2.279	Kaumualiʻi Highway (Route 50)	Kikala Road	—	—	Puʻuwai Road
Route 536	0.388	0.624	Kaumualiʻi Highway (Route 50)	Kōloa Road (Route 530)	—	—	Piko Road
Route 540	3.876	6.238	Kaumualiʻi Highway (Route 50) at Port Allen/ʻEleʻele	Kaumualiʻi Highway (Route 50) at Kalāheo	—	—	Halewili Road
Route 541	0.370	0.595	End of state highway at Hanapepe Bay	Kaumualiʻi Highway (Route 50) at Port Allen/ʻEleʻele	—	—	Waialo Road
Route 543	1.41	2.27	Kaumualiʻi Highway (Route 50)	Gate at end of road	—	—	Moi Road
Route 545	0.98	1.58	Kaumualiʻi Highway (Route 50)	Kaumualiʻi Highway (Route 50)	—	—	Hanapepe Road
Route 550	14.080	22.660	Kaumualiʻi Highway (Route 50) in Waimea	Entrance to Kōkeʻe State Park	—	—	Waimea Canyon Drive, Kōkeʻe Road: Former portion of Route 55
Route 551	2.493	4.012	Kaumualiʻi Highway (Route 50)	Kaumualiʻi Highway (Route 50)	—	—	Kekaha Road, Akialoa Road
Route 552	7.55	12.15	Kaumualiʻi Highway (Route 50)	Waimea Canyon Drive (Route 550)	—	—	Alae Road, Kōkeʻe Road
Route 553	1.086	1.748	Kaumualiʻi Highway (Route 50)	Gay Road	—	—	Menehune Road
Route 554	0.201	0.323	Kaumualiʻi Highway (Route 50)	Ala Wai Road	—	—	Waimea Road
Route 560	10.010	16.110	Parking lot at Hāʻena State Park	End of Route 56 in Princeville	—	—	Kūhiō Highway: Former portion of Route 56
Route 562	1.726	2.778	Kūhiō Highway (Route 56)	Kīlauea National Wildlife Refuge	—	—	Kolo Road, Kīlauea Road
Route 563	0.238	0.383	Kūhiō Highway (Route 560)	Weke Road (Route 565)	—	—	Aku Road
Route 565	1.110	1.786	Anae Road	Hanalei Beach Park	—	—	Weke Road
Route 566	1.678	2.700	Kūhiō Highway (Route 56)	Kūhiō Highway (Route 56)	—	—	Anahola Road, Manai Road, Kukuihale Road
Route 570	1.120	1.802	Kūhiō Highway (Route 56) in Līhuʻe	0.06 mi east of Kapule Highway (Route 51) (Līhuʻe Airport)	1965	current	Ahukini Road: Former Route 57
Route 580	6.680	10.750	Ford crossing of stream south of Wailua Reservoir	Kūhiō Highway (Route 56) in Wailua	—	—	Kuamoʻo Road: Former portion of Route 58
Route 581	5.06	8.14	Kūhiō Highway (Route 56)	Kuamoʻo Road (Route 580)	—	—	Kukui Street, Olohena Road, Kamalu Road
Route 583	0.920	1.481	Kūhiō Highway (Route 56) at Kapaia	Wailua Falls	—	—	Maʻalo Road: Former Route 48 and Route 481; original route to Wailua River now a private road
Route 610	—	—	—	—	—	—	replaced by Route 61
Route 630	—	—	—	—	—	—	Became Route 65
Route 710	—	—	—	—	—	—	Became Route 7241
Route 740	—	—	—	—	—	—	Became a portion of Route 72
Route 741	—	—	—	—	—	—	Became a portion of Route 99
Route 742	—	—	Route 7101 in Pearl City	Entrance to Naval facilities on Waipio Peninsula	—	—	Appears on 1962 state route map but not on 1973 map
Route 750	8.046	12.949	H-1 / Route 76	Wilikina Drive (Route 99) near Schofield Barracks	—	—	Kunia Road: Former portion of Route 75
Route 760	—	—	Route 7110 (then Route 90) in Ewa	Route 76	—	1982	Became a portion of Route 76
Route 764	—	—	—	—	—	—	Became Route 7141
Route 780	—	—	Route 93	South entrance to Lualualei Naval Ammunition Depot	—	—	Became a portion of Military Route 78
Route 782	—	—	Military Route 782 at west boundary of Lualualei Naval Ammunition Depot	Route 93 in Waianae	—	—	Removed sometime after 1962; does not appear on 1973 highway map
Route 801	2.20	3.54	Kamehameha Highway (Route 80)	Wilikina Drive (Route 803)	—	—	Kaukonahua Road
Route 804	—	—	—	—	—	—	Became Route 7012
Route 806	—	—	Route 99 south of Wahiawa	towards Leilehua High School	—	—	Appears in 1967 Hawaii DOT planning document, but does not appear on that document's map or in any earlier or later plan; apparently never built
Route 809	—	—	—	—	—	—	Now part of Route 80
Route 821	—	—	Route 82 in Waialua	Route 83 in Haleiwa	—	—	Appears on official maps through the mid-1960s; targeted for deletion from Federal-aid system in mid-1960s
Route 830	5.5	8.9	Route 63 / Route 83	Route 83 near Kahaluu	—	—	Part of the Kamehameha Highway
Route 835	—	—	Route 83 in Waimea	Gate near Pupukea Boy Scout Camp	—	—	Appears as a numbered highway on maps and Hawaii DOT planning documents (identified as a county route) in the early 1960s; targeted for deletion from the Federal-aid system in the mid-1960s, but unclear when that recommendation was carried out
Route 900	—	—	—	—	—	—	Became portions of Route 93 and Route 7110
Route 901	1.383	2.226	Route 8940 / Route 8945 at entrance to MCAS Barbers Point	H-1	—	—	Fort Barrette Road: Was Federal-aid route 1901 before the late 1960s
Route 920	—	—	—	—	—	—	Redesignated Route 1092B
Route 930	7.931	12.764	Kaʻena Point State Park boundary	J.P. Leong Highway (Route 83) south of Haleʻiwa	—	—	Farrington Highway, Kaukonahua Road: Former portions of Route 83, Route 99, and possibly Route 990; was proposed to run to Route 93 at southern entrance to Kaʻena Point State Park, but this section was abandoned by 1983 when the Kaʻena Point Natural Area Preserve was established
Route 990	—	—	—	—	—	—	Became a portion of Route 930
Route 1092B	—	—	—	—	—	—	Former Route 920, became Route 92
Route 1100	3.073	4.946	Kaiwi Street (Route 1835)	Queen Kaʻahumanu Highway (Route 19), Kailua-Kona	—	—	Kuakini Highway
Route 1110	4.440	7.145	Aliʻi Drive (Route 186)	Queen Kaʻahumanu Highway (Route 11)	proposed	—	Aliʻi Highway/Parkway
Route 1370	2.961	4.765	Route 19 / Route 1970 in Hilo	Hilo Harbor east entrance	—	—	Kalanianaʻole Avenue: Former portion of Route 120
Route 1810	0.830	1.336	Hienaloli Road	Queen Kaʻahumanu Highway (Route 11)	—	—	Nani Kailua Drive
Route 1830	0.342	0.550	Kuakini Highway (Route 1100)	Queen Kaʻahumanu Highway (Route 11)	—	—	Henry Street
Route 1835	0.527	0.848	Queen Kaʻahumanu Highway (Route 19)	Kuakini Highway (Route 1100)	—	—	Kaiwi Street
Route 1880	5.655	9.101	Palani Road (Route 190)	Kaiminani Drive (Route 198)	proposed	—	Ane Kehokalole Highway
Route 1901	—	—	—	—	—	—	Redesignated Route 901
Route 1905	0.676	1.088	Uluaʻoʻa Street	Palani Road (Route 190)	—	—	Kealakaʻa Street
Route 1910	0.651	1.048	Waiānuenue Avenue (Route 1950)	Pauahi Street (Route 19)	—	—	Kamehameha Avenue
Route 1920	4.070	6.550	Ponahawai Street (Route 2730)	Kanoelehua Avenue (Route 11)	—	—	Kīlauea Avenue
Route 1921	0.358	0.576	Ponahawai Street (Route 2730)	Waiānuenue Avenue (Route 1950)	—	—	Kīlauea Avenue, Keawe Street
Route 1925	0.308	0.496	Kamehameha Avenue (Route 19)	Kīlauea Avenue (Route 1920)	—	—	Pauahi Street
Route 1930	3.912	6.296	Wailuku Drive (Route 2860)	Haihai Street (Route 2740)	—	—	Kinoʻole Street
Route 1940	2.992	4.815	Waiānuenue Avenue (Route 1950)	ʻĀinaola Drive (Route 2750)	—	—	Komohana Street
Route 1950	7.849	12.632	Kamehameha Avenue (Route 1910)	Hilo urban boundary	—	—	Waiānuenue Avenue, Kaumana Drive, Saddle Road
Route 1960	1.344	2.163	Leilani Street	Kahaopea Street	—	—	Railroad Avenue
Route 1970	0.934	1.503	Railroad Avenue	Kalanianaʻole Street (Route 19)	—	—	Kamehameha Avenue, Silva Street: Shown as Route 19 on 1976 map
Route 2000	6.870	11.056	Komohana Street (Route 1940)	Railroad Avenue (Route 1960) in south Hilo	—	—	Puainako Street: Portion of route former Route 123
Route 2460	0.670	1.078	Māmalahoa Highway (Route 19)	Hiʻiaka Street	—	—	Kamamalu Street
Route 2470	0.290	0.467	Hokuʻula Road	Kawaihae Road	—	—	Lindsey Road
Route 2710	1.526	2.456	Hilo south urban boundary	Volcano Road (Route 11)	—	—	Stainback Highway
Route 2720	2.055	3.307	Kaumana Drive (Route 1950)	Akolea Road (Route 2850)	—	—	Waiānuenue Avenue
Route 2730	1.103	1.775	Komohana Street (route 1940)	Kamehameha Avenue (Route 1910)	—	—	Ponahawai Street
Route 2740	2.547	4.099	Kīlauea Avenue (Route 1920)	Kupulau Road	—	—	Haihai Street
Route 2750	2.149	3.458	Kawailani Street (Route 2760)	Kupulau Road	—	—	ʻĀinaola Drive
Route 2760	3.745	6.027	Kanoelehua Avenue (Route 11)	ʻĀinaola Drive (Route 2750)	—	—	Kawailani Street, Kupulau Place, Kupulau Road
Route 2770	3.744	6.025	Haihai Street (Route 2740)	Kamehameha Avenue (Route 19)	—	—	Iwalani Street, Kawili Street
Route 2790	1.135	1.827	Kīlauea Avenue (Route 1920)	Komohana Street (Route 1940)	—	—	Mohouli Street
Route 2810	0.810	1.304	Kanoelehua Avenue (Route 11)	Kīlauea Avenue (Route 1920)	—	—	Kekuanaoa Street
Route 2820	1.810	2.913	Kanoelehua Avenue (Route 11)	Mohouli Street (Route 2790)	—	—	Lanikaula Street, Kumukoa Street
Route 2840	1.504	2.420	Kaumana Drive (Route 1950)	Waiānuenue Avenue (Route 2720)	—	—	ʻĀinako Avenue, Lahi Street
Route 2850	1.877	3.021	Waiānuenue Avenue (Route 2720)	Kaumana Drive (Route 1950)	—	—	Akolea Road
Route 2860	1.720	2.768	Māmalahoa Highway (Route 19)	Kinoʻole Street (Route 1930)	—	—	Wainaku Avenue, Wailuku Drive
Route 3000	8.95	14.40	Honoapiʻilani Highway (Route 30) south of Lāhaina	Honoapiʻilani Highway (Route 30)	2013	current	Lāhaina Bypass: bypass of Route 30
Route 3400	2.624	4.223	Kaʻahumanu Avenue (Route 32) in Kahului	Kahekili Highway (Route 3405)	—	—	Kahului Beach Road, Waiehu Beach Road: Former portion of Route 34 (later Route 340) and possibly County Route 341
Route 3500	1.110	1.786	Kuihelani Highway (Route 380)	Kaʻahumanu Avenue (Route 32) in Kahului	—	—	Puʻunēnē Avenue: Former portion of Route 350 (and possibly Route 35); section east of Route 380 now part of Route 311
Route 3800	1.500	2.414	Puʻunēnē Avenue (Route 3500)	Henaloa Street, Kahului Airport	—	—	Kahului Airport Access Road: Bypass of Route 380
Route 5010	0.984	1.584	Kaumualiʻi Highway (Route 50)	Hulemalu Street	—	—	Puhi Road
Route 5020	1.015	1.633	Kapule Highway (Route 51)	Kaumualiʻi Highway (Route 50)	—	—	Rice Street
Route 5030	1.30	2.09	Kaumualiʻi Highway (Route 50)	Halekaha Road	proposed	—	Nuhou Street
Route 5035	0.401	0.645	Kaumualiʻi Highway (Route 50)	Pīkake Street	—	—	Kalepa Street
Route 5040	0.646	1.040	Rice Street (Route 5020)	Nāwiliwili Road (Route 58)	—	—	Haleko Road
Route 5600	3.4	5.5	Route 56 in Wailua	Route 56 north of Kapaʻa	1996	current	
Route 5710	0.473	0.761	Rice Street (Route 5020)	Ahukini Road (Route 570)	—	—	Umi Street
Route 5720	0.679	1.093	Kūhiō Highway (Route 56)	Rice Street (Route 5020)	—	—	Hardy Street
Route 5730	0.790	1.271	Umi Street (Route 5710)	Hoʻolako Street	—	—	Puaole Street
Route 5740	1.046	1.683	Kūhiō Highway (Route 56)	Laukona Street (loop)	—	—	Laukona Street
Route 5750	0.290	0.467	Kūhiō Highway (Route 56)	Hehi Road	—	—	Hanamalu Road
Route 5805	0.217	0.349	Kūhiō Highway (Route 56)	Kukui Street (Route 581)	—	—	Ulu Street
Route 5840	1.245	2.004	Kūhiō Highway (Route 56)	Kaulana Road	—	—	Haleʻīlio Road
Route 5850	0.576	0.927	Haleʻīlio Road (Route 5840)	Lanakila Road	—	—	Nonou Road
Route 5860	4.765	7.669	Kūhiō Highway (Route 56)	Olohena Road (Route 581)	—	—	Kawaihau Road, Kaʻapuni Road
Route 5865	1.049	1.688	Kūhiō Highway (Route 56)	Kawaihau Road (Route 5860)	—	—	Hauʻaʻala Road
Route 5870	0.549	0.884	Kūhiō Highway (Route 56)	Kawaihau Road (Route 5860)	—	—	Mailihuna Road
Route 7012	1.860	2.993	Kamehameha Highway (Route 80)	Waihawā Naval Reservation	—	—	Whitmore Avenue: Former Route 804
Route 7101	3.000	4.828	Kunia Road (Route 76)	Kamehameha Highway (Route 99)	—	—	Farrington Highway: Former portion of Route 90
Route 7110	0.600	0.966	West access to Old Fort Weaver Road	Fort Weaver Road (Route 76)	—	—	Farrington Highway: Former portion of Route 90; shown on 1973 highway map as Route 760
Route 7141	1.496	2.408	Fort Weaver Road (Route 76) in ʻEwa	Entrance to Lualualei Naval Ammunition Depot	—	—	Iroquois Road: Unsigned; former Route 764; still shown as Route 764 on some maps
Route 7200	—	—	Kamehameha Highway (Route 99) south of Aloha Stadium	Salt Lake Boulevard (Route 67)/Kahuapaʻani Street (Route 7241)	—	—	Formerly part of Halawa Heights Road; proposed route; appears in 1978 Hawaii DOT planning document as an unfunded project, but does not appear on any earlier or later plan; apparently never built; if constructed, might have been signed with a different number as Hawaii DOT was not using four-digit highway numbers at the time
Route 7239	0.329	0.529	Kahuapaʻani Street (Route 7241)	ʻIwaʻiwa Street	—	—	Ulune Street, Hālawa Valley Road: Unsigned; added to numbered state highway system between 2002 and 2004, but apparently had been unnumbered road under state jurisdiction back to at least 1996
Route 7241	2.324	3.740	Inside Gate 3 at Camp H.M. Smith	Salt Lake Boulevard (Route 7311)	—	—	Kahuapaʻani Street, Halawa Heights Road: Unsigned; section along Halawa Heights Road former Route 67 or Route 71 and later Route 710
Route 7310	1.030	1.658	Kamehameha Highway/Nimitz Highway (Route 92) underneath H-1	Southwest end of Puʻuloa overcrossing at H-201	—	—	Puʻuloa Road: Former portion of Route 66
Route 7345	0.551	0.887	Moanalua Freeway (southwest Puʻuloa Road overcrossing H-201)	Gate to Tripler Medical Center	—	—	Jarret White Road: Possible former portion of Route 66; may also be a portion of Route 7310
Route 7350	0.586	0.943	Radford Drive (Route 7351) east of Pearl Harbor	Salt Lake Boulevard (Route 7311)	—	—	Bougainville Drive, unsigned
Route 7351	0.230	0.370	Kamehameha Highway (Route 99) east of Pearl Harbor	Bougainville Drive (Route 7350)	—	—	Radford Drive, unsigned
Route 7401	1.95	3.14	King Street (Route 7402)	Middle Street (Route 7415)	—	—	Kamehameha Highway, Dillingham Boulevard: Former portion of Route 90, part of the Kamehameha Highway
Route 7413	0.343	0.552	H-1 underpass	Dillingham Boulevard at North King Street (Route 7402)	—	—	Liliha Street, unsigned; south of Vineyard Street was former portion of Route 90; later entire route former Route 97
Route 7415	0.517	0.832	H-1 (Keehi IC, exit 18)/Kamehameha Highway (Route 7401)/Nimitz Highway (Route 92)	Middle Street (County Route 7414)	—	—	Middle Street, unsigned; former portion of Route 65; formerly connected to Route 92
Route 7601	0.419	0.674	Kapiʻolani Boulevard (Route 7503)	End of divided roadway	—	—	Old Waiʻalae Road, unsigned; former portion of Route 72
Route 7714	0.086	0.138	—	—	—	—	
Route 7801	1.56	2.51	Off-ramp from H-1	Kilauea Avenue (Route 7812)	—	—	Waialae Avenue
Route 8300	1.969	3.169	Weed Junction (Route 930) in Haleiwa	J.P. Leong Highway (Route 83)	—	—	Kamehameha Highway: Former portion of Route 83
Route 8930	2.461	3.961	Kapolei Parkway	H-1 / Makakilo Drive	2010	current	Kualakai Parkway
Route 8940	3.30	5.31	Kamokila Boulevard (Route 8915)	Gate at Geiger Road (Route 7140)	—	—	Franklin D. Roosevelt Avenue
Route 8945	0.970	1.561	Midway Avenue	Franklin D. Roosevelt Avenue (Route 8940)	—	—	Enterprise Avenue
Route 8955	2.689	4.328	Coast Guard entrance to Barbers Point NAS	Franklin D. Roosevelt Avenue (Route 8940)	—	—	Coral Sea Road
Former; Proposed and unbuilt

== Numbered county routes ==
Number	Length (mi)	Length (km)	Southern or western terminus	Northern or eastern terminus	Formed	Removed	Notes
Route 132	7.740	12.456	Keeau-Pahoa Road (Route 130)	Kaimu-Kapoho Road (County Route 137)	—	—	Pāhoa-Kapoho Road: Apparently transferred to county jurisdiction in the late 1960s; originally continued to a lighthouse on Cape Kumukahi, but this section was dropped from the numbered county route system sometime later
Route 137	2.8	4.5	Kalanianaʻole Street (Route 1370) in Hilo, at east entrance to Hilo Harbor	End of pavement	—	—	Kalanianaʻole Street: Former portion of Route 120
Route 137	14.6	23.5	End of pavement at Kaimu	Pāhoa-Kapoho Road (County Route 132)	—	—	Kaimu-Kapoho Road: Originally continued southwest of Kaimu to Route 130 near Kalapana, but this shut down due to lava flows
Route 148	4.8	7.7	End of pavement	Hawaii Belt Road (Route 11) in Volcano	—	—	Wright Road, Amaumau Road
Route 180	9.14	14.71	Kuakini Highway (Route 11), Holualoa	Māmalahoa Highway (Route 190), Palani Junction	—	—	Haʻawina Street, Māmalahoa Highway
Route 182	0.49	0.79	Kuakini Highway (Route 11), Kailua-Kona	End of route (future connection to Aliʻi Drive)	—	—	Lako Street
Route 185	1.76	2.83	Kuakini Highway (Route 11), Kailua-Kona	Manukai Street	—	—	Kamehameha III Road
Route 187	12.7	20.4	Halekiʻi Street	Palani Road (Route 190)/Kuakini Highway in Kailua-Kona	—	—	Aliʻi Drive: Much of route not part of the 1960s state route system or Federal-aid system, but was added to the numbered county highway system later; northern 0.5 mile formerly part of Route 182; planned to be extended south to Route 11 and County Route 160
Route 365	5.36	8.63	Kokomo Road (Route 366) in Haʻikū	Hāna Highway (Route 36) in Haʻikū	—	—	
Route 366	5.56	8.95	Hāna Highway (Route 36) in Haʻikū	Makawao Avenue (Route 365) in Makawao	—	—	Haʻikū Road, Kokomo Road
Route 371	2.62	4.22	Haleakalā Highway (Route 37)	Baldwin Avenue (Route 390)	—	—	Haliʻimalie Road
Route 390	6.94	11.17	Hāna Highway (Route 36) in Paia	Olinda Road southeast of Makawao	—	—	Baldwin Avenue and Olinda Road: Formerly part of Route 39
Route 430	0.912	1.468	Kaumalapau Highway (Route 440)	Caldwell Avenue	—	—	Fraser Avenue
Route 435	0.984	1.584	Kaumalapau Highway (Route 440)	End of county route	—	—	Lānaʻi Avenue
Route 442	0.203	0.327	Manele Road (Route 440) in Lānaʻi City	Lānaʻi Avenue (Route 435)	—	—	Kaumalapau Highway: Former portion of Route 44 and formerly Route 440S; possibly unsigned
Route 475	4.064	6.540	Farrington Highway (Route 480)	End of county route	—	—	Lihi Pali Avenue, Puʻukapele Avenue
Route 637	—	—	Mokapu Boulevard/Mokapu Saddle Road (Route 65) on the south shore of Kaneohe Bay	North Kalaheo Avenue (Route 638)/Mokapu Boulevard (Route 65/Route 63)	—	—	Kaneohe Bay Drive: Former portion of Route 63 and later Route 630 until that was transferred to what is now Route 65; part shown as Route 637 on 1976 official map (as a Federal Aid Secondary County highway); a 1973 map shows the route from the-now end of Route 72 via Kawainui Marsh to Kaneohe Bay near the present junction of Kaneohe Bay Drive and Route 65, but this was later abandoned; early 1950s plans had the route assigned to Route 630
Route 638	—	—	Kaneohe Bay Drive (Route 637)/Mokapu Boulevard (Route 65/Route 63)	Kuulei Avenue (Route 61?)	—	—	North Kalaheo Avenue: Shown as Route 638 on 1976 official map (as a Federal Aid Secondary County highway) and 1959 unofficial map; indicated as part of Route 637 on some maps; original 1955 plan has this segment as part of Route 630
Route 801	—	—	Kaukonahua Road/Wilikina Drive (Route 803)	Kamehameha Highway/Kamananui Road (Route 80/Route 99)	—	—	Kaukonahua Road: Former portion of Route 80
Route 803	—	—	Farrington Highway (Route 930)	Wilikina Drive/Kamananui Road (Route 99) northwest of Wahiawa	—	—	Kaukonahua Road, Wilikina Drive: Former portion of Route 99
Route 3010	2.665	4.289	Honoapiʻilani Highway (Route 30) in Lāhaina	Honoapiʻilani Highway (Route 30)	—	—	Front Street
Route 3015	0.458	0.737	Kenui Street (Route 3070) in Lāhaina	Lāhainaluna Road (Route 3040) in Lāhaina	—	—	Waineʻe Street
Route 3020	0.23	0.37	Front Street (Route 3010) in Lāhaina	Honoapiʻilani Highway (Route 30) in Lāhaina	—	—	Papalaua Street
Route 3025	0.92	1.48	Honoapiʻilani Highway (Route 30) in Lāhaina	Kapunakea Street (Route 3060) in Lāhaina	—	—	Kaniʻau Road, ʻĀinakea Street
Route 3030	0.27	0.43	Front Street (Route 3010) in Lāhaina	Honoapiʻilani Highway (Route 30) in Lāhaina	—	—	Dickenson Street
Route 3040	1.629	2.622	Front Street (Route 3010) in Lāhaina	Lāhainaluna School entry	—	—	Lāhainaluna Road
Route 3050	0.219	0.352	Front Street (Route 3010)	Honoapiʻilani Highway (Route 30)	—	—	Shaw Street
Route 3060	0.800	1.287	Front Street (Route 3010)	Lāhaina Bypass (Route 3000)	proposed	—	Kapunakea Street
Route 3070	0.204	0.328	Front Street (Route 3010)	Honoapiʻilani Highway (Route 30)	—	—	Kenui Street
Route 3075	0.890	1.432	Honoapiʻilani Highway (Route 30)	Lāhaina Bypass (Route 3000)	proposed	—	Keawe Street
Route 3080	3.324	5.349	Honoapiʻilani Highway (Route 30)	Nāpilihau Street (Route 3090)	—	—	Lower Honoapiʻilani Road
Route 3090	0.256	0.412	Lower Honoapiʻilani Highway (Route 3080)	Honoapiʻilani Highway (Route 30)	—	—	Nāpilihau Street
Route 3100	6.171	9.931	North Kīhei Road (Route 310)	Okolani Drive (Route 3125)	—	—	South Kīhei Road
Route 3115	4.910	7.902	Keonekai Road	Uwapo Road	proposed	—	Kenolio Road, North-South Connector
Route 3120	0.700	1.127	Piʻilani Highway (Route 31)	South Kīhei Road (Route 3100)	—	—	Kilohana Drive
Route 3125	0.833	1.341	Piʻilani Highway (Route 31)	South Kīhei Road (Route 3100)	—	—	Okolani Drive
Route 3130	0.613	0.987	Piʻilani Highway (Route 31)	South Kīhei Road (Route 3100)	—	—	Keonekai Road
Route 3135	1.339	2.155	Kilohana Drive (Route 3120)	Wailea ʻIke Drive (3137)	—	—	Wailea Alanui Drive
Route 3137	0.619	0.996	Piʻilani Highway (Route 31)	Wailea Alanui Drive (Route 3135)	—	—	Wailea ʻIke Drive
Route 3138	0.511	0.822	South Kīhei Road (Route 3100)	Piʻilani Highway (Route 31)	—	—	Alanui ke Aliʻi Drive
Route 3140	0.487	0.784	Piʻilani Highway (Route 31)	South Kīhei Road (Route 3100)	—	—	Kanani Road
Route 3150	0.571	0.919	South Kīhei Road (Route 3100)	Piʻilani Highway (Route 31)	—	—	Welakahao Road
Route 3160	0.580	0.933	Piʻilani Highway (Route 31)	South Kīhei Road (Route 3100)	—	—	Līpoa Street
Route 3165	0.594	0.956	South Kīhei Road (Route 3100)	Piʻilani Highway (Route 31)	—	—	Piʻikea Avenue
Route 3170	0.567	0.912	Piʻilani Highway (Route 31)	South Kīhei Road (Route 3100)	—	—	Waipuilani Road
Route 3175	0.508	0.818	Piʻilani Highway (Route 31)	South Kīhei Road (Route 3100)	—	—	Kulanihakoi Street
Route 3180	1.090	1.754	Wells Street (Route 3830)	Kuikahi Drive (Route 3210)	—	—	Waiʻale Road
Route 3185	0.420	0.676	Honoapiʻilani Highway (Route 30)	Waiʻale Road	—	—	East Waikō Road
Route 3190	0.960	1.545	Hoalike Street	South Kīhei Road (Route 3100)	—	—	Ohukai Road
Route 3200	2.712	4.365	High Street (Route 30)	ʻĪao Valley State Park	—	—	West Main Street, ʻĪao Valley Road
Route 3210	1.100	1.770	South Alu Road	Waiʻale Road (Route 3180)	—	—	Kuikahi Drive
Route 3231	1.174	1.889	Kaʻahumanu Avenue (Route 32)	Waiʻale Road (Route 3180)	—	—	Mahalani Street, Waiʻinu Road
Route 3405	2.243	3.610	Wells Street (Route 3830)	Waiehu Beach Road (Route 3400)	—	—	South Market Street, North Market Street, Kahekili Highway
Route 3410	0.518	0.834	Kahului Beach Road (Route 3400)	Papa Avenue (Route 3910)	—	—	Wahinepio Avenue
Route 3420	0.912	1.468	Kaʻahumanu Avenue (Route 32)	Kahului Beach Road (Route 3400)	—	—	Kanaloa Avenue
Route 3600	2.000	3.219	Mokulele Highway (Route 311)	Hāna Highway (Route 36) west of Pāʻia	—	—	Hansen Road
Route 3610	1.610	2.591	Old Haleakalā Highway (Route 367)	End of ʻIolani Street	—	—	Loha Street, ʻIolani Street
Route 3620	1.407	2.264	Old Haleakalā Highway (Route 367)	ʻĀina Lani Drive	—	—	Pukalani Street, Liholani Street
Route 3630	2.034	3.273	Old Haleakalā Highway (Route 367)	Makawao Avenue (Route 365)	—	—	Makani Road
Route 3700	38.546	62.034	Kula Highway (Route 37)	Keawa Place (Route 360)	—	—	Piʻilani Highway, Hāna Highway
Route 3830	1.965	3.162	South High Street (Route 30)	Waiehu Beach Road (Route 3400)	—	—	Wells Street, Waiʻale Road, East Main Street
Route 3840	0.633	1.019	North Market Street (Route 3405)	East Main Street (Route 3830)	—	—	Mill Street
Route 3910	2.558	4.117	Kaʻahumanu Avenue (Route 32)	Puʻunēnē Avenue (Route 3500)	—	—	Papa Avenue
Route 3920	1.640	2.639	Kaʻahumanu Avenue (Route 32)	Hāna Highway (Route 36)	—	—	Wakea Avenue
Route 3930	0.800	1.287	Wakea Avenue (Route 3920)	Papa Avenue (Route 3910)	—	—	Hina Avenue
Route 3940	1.730	2.784	Hāna Highway (Route 36)	Papa Avenue (Route 3910)	—	—	Kamehameha Avenue
Route 3945	0.703	1.131	Kamehameha Avenue (Route 3940)	Dairy Road (Route 380)	—	—	Alamaha Street
Route 3950	1.300	2.092	Kaʻahumanu Avenue (Route 32)	Papa Avenue (Route 3910)	—	—	Lono Avenue
Route 3960	0.660	1.062	Wakea Avenue	Papa Avenue (Route 3910)	—	—	Oneheʻe Avenue
Route 3970	0.580	0.933	Wakea Avenue (Route 3920)	Papa Avenue (Route 3910)	—	—	Kea Street
Route 6001	0.20	0.32	Kawainui Stream bridge	Oneawa Street (Route 6016)	—	—	Kailua Road
Route 6010	0.775	1.247	Keolu Drive (Route 6013)	Kailua Road (Route 61)	—	—	Hāmākua Drive
Route 6011	1.063	1.711	Oneawa Street (Route 6016)	Kalāheo Avenue (Route 6012)	—	—	Kailua Road
Route 6012	2.114	3.402	Kailua Road (Route 6011)	Mōkapu Boulevard (Route 65)	—	—	Kalāheo Avenue
Route 6013	3.174	5.108	Kalanianaʻole Highway (Route 72)	Keolu Drive	—	—	Keolu Drive
Route 6014	0.586	0.943	Kailua Road (Route 6011)	Kalāheo Avenue (Route 6012)	—	—	Kuʻulei Road
Route 6015	0.598	0.962	North Kalāheo Avenue (Route 6012)	Kāneʻohe Marine Corps Air Station	—	—	Mōkapu Road
Route 6016	1.289	2.074	Kailua Road (Route 6011)	Mōkapu Boulevard (Route 65)	—	—	Oneawa Street
Route 6017	0.841	1.353	Kailua Road (Route 6011)	Keolu Drive (Route 6013)	—	—	Wanaʻao Road
Route 6020	0.265	0.426	Keolu Drive (Route 6013)	Kina Street (Route 6048)	—	—	Nanialiʻi Street
Route 6025	0.734	1.181	Kalanianaʻole Highway (Route 72)	keolu Drive (Route 6013)	—	—	Kanapuʻu Drive
Route 6041	1.748	2.813	Kainui Drive (Route 6042)	Kailua Road (Route 6011)	—	—	Kainalu Drive
Route 6042	0.687	1.106	Oneawa Street (Route 6016)	Kalāheo Avenue (Route 6012)	—	—	Kainui Drive
Route 6043	1.009	1.624	Oneawa Street (Route 6016)	Oneawa Street (Route 6016)	—	—	Kīhāpai Street, Punaʻa Street
Route 6044	0.374	0.602	Oneawa Street (Route 6016)	Kainalu Drive (Route 6041)	—	—	Kalama Street
Route 6045	0.604	0.972	Kailua Road (Route 6011)	Mokulua Drive	—	—	South Kalāheo Avenue, Lihiwai Road, Kawailoa Road, Alala Road
Route 6046	0.319	0.513	Wanaʻao Road (Route 6017)	Papalani Street (Route 6047)	—	—	Awakea Road, Ka Awakea Road
Route 6047	0.417	0.671	Wanaʻao Road (Route 6017)	Keolu Drive (Route 6013)	—	—	Papalani Street
Route 6048	1.638	2.636	Keolu Drive (Route 6013)	Hele Street (Route 6048)	—	—	Hele Street, Kina Street
Route 6049	1.194	1.922	Keolu Drive (Route 6013)	Keolu Drive (Route 6013)	—	—	Akamai Street, ʻAkumu Street
Route 6050	1.058	1.703	Kailua Road (Route 61)	Kalanianaʻole Highway (Route 61)	—	—	Ulumanu Drive, Ulupiʻi Street, Uluhaha Street
Route 6051	1.236	1.989	Kalanianaʻole Highway (Route 61)	Aloha ʻOe Drive	—	—	Auloa Road, Maunawili Road
Route 6510	5.515	8.876	Kāneʻohe Bay Drive (Route 65)	Kahekili Highway (Route 83)	—	—	Kamehameha Highway
Route 6511	2.587	4.163	Mōkapu Saddle Road (Route 65)	Mōkapu Boulevard (Route 65)	—	—	Kāneʻohe Bay Drive
Route 6542	1.196	1.925	Kahekili Highway (Route 83)	Kahuhipa Street (Route 6544)	—	—	Haʻikū Road
Route 6543	0.736	1.184	Kamehameha Highway (Route 6510)	Poʻokela Street	—	—	Keaʻahala Road
Route 6544	1.182	1.902	Kamehameha Highway (Route 6510)	Haʻikū Road (Route 6542)	—	—	Kahuhipa Street
Route 6545	1.320	2.124	Kamehameha Highway (Route 6510)	Kamehameha Highway (Route 6510)	—	—	Lilipuna Road, Wailele Road, William Henry Road
Route 6546	1.044	1.680	Kamehameha Highway (Route 6510)	Kāneʻohe Beach Park	—	—	Waikalua Road
Route 6547	1.041	1.675	Kapunahala Elementary School entrance	Kamehameha Highway (Route 83)	—	—	Anoi Road, Luluku Road
Route 6548	0.801	1.289	Kamehameha Highway (Route 83)	Mokulele Drive (Route 6549)	—	—	Koa Kahiko Street, Kenela Street, Namoku Street
Route 6549	1.163	1.872	Kamehameha Highway (Route 83)	Kāneʻohe Bay Drive (Route 65)	—	—	Mokulele Drive
Route 6551	0.164	0.264	Kāneʻohe Bay Drive (Route 65)	Koa Kahiko Street (Route 6548)	—	—	Aumoku Street
Route 6553	1.39	2.24	Kahekili Highway (Route 83)	Kahekili Highway (Route 83)	—	—	Hui ʻIwa Street, Hui ʻŪlili Street, ʻĀhuimanu Place
Route 6554	0.403	0.649	Kamehameha Highway (Route 83)	Ahilama Road	—	—	Waiheʻe Road
Route 7010	3.257	5.242	Kilani Avenue (Route 7011)	0.20 mi northeast of Hill Drive	—	—	California Avenue
Route 7011	1.367	2.200	California Avenue (Route 7010)	Glen Avenue (Route 7041)	—	—	Kilani Avenue
Route 7013	3.779	6.082	Kaʻapeha Street	Lanikūhana Avenue (Route 7042)	—	—	Meheʻula Parkway
Route 7041	0.806	1.297	Kilani Avenue (Route 7011)	California Avenue (Route 7010)	—	—	Glen Avenue, Royal Palm Drive, ʻUʻuku Street
Route 7042	3.880	6.244	Ahiku Street	Meheʻula Parkway (Route 7013)	—	—	Lanikūhana Avenue
Route 7043	2.187	3.520	Meheʻula Parkway (Route 7013)	Lanikūhana Avenue (Route 7042)	—	—	Kuahelani Avenue
Route 7139	0.842	1.355	Farrington Highway (Route 7101)	Waipiʻo Soccer Complex gate	—	—	Waipiʻo Point Access Road
Route 7140	1.144	1.841	Franklin D. Roosevelt Avenue (Route 8940)	Fort Weaver Road (Route 76)	—	—	Geiger Road
Route 7142	3.018	4.857	Kunia Road (Route 76)	Kamehameha Highway (Route 99)	—	—	Waipahu Street
Route 7143	0.143	0.230	Waipahu Street (Route 7142)	Farrington Highway (Route 7101)	—	—	Waipahu Depot Road
Route 7144	0.999	1.608	Fort Weaver Road (Route 76)	North Road (Route 7145)	—	—	Hanakahi Street
Route 7145	0.719	1.157	Fort Weaver Road (Route 76)	Hanakahi Street (Route 7144)	—	—	North Road
Route 7146	1.698	2.733	Fort Weaver Road (Route 76)	0.01 mi west of Kihi Street	—	—	Renton Road
Route 7147	1.257	2.023	Farrington Highway (Route 7110)	Fort Weaver Road (Route 76)	—	—	Old Fort Weaver Road
Route 7148	0.784	1.262	Fort Weaver Road (Route 76)	Pohakūpuna Road	—	—	Papipi Road
Route 7150	0.549	0.884	Fort Weaver Road (Route 76)	Kapolei Parkway (Route 8920)	—	—	Kolowaka Drive
Route 7160	1.045	1.682	H-2	Kamehameha Highway (Route 99)	—	—	Ka Uka Boulevard
Route 7165	1.421	2.287	Ka Uka Boulevard (Route 7160)	Kamehameha Highway (Route 99)	—	—	Waipiʻo Uka Street
Route 7170	1.403	2.258	Farrington Highway (Route 7101)	Lumiʻāina Street (Route 7175)	—	—	Paiwa Street
Route 7175	0.967	1.556	Paiwa Street (Route 7170)	Kamehameha Highway (Route 99)	—	—	Lumiʻāina Street
Route 7180	1.940	3.122	Kunia Road (Route 750)	Kunia Road (Route 750)	—	—	Kūpuna Loop
Route 7210	3.403	5.477	Waimano Home Road (Route 7211)	Kaimakani Street	—	—	Moanalua Road
Route 7211	2.225	3.581	Kamehameha Highway (Route 99)	Entrance to Waimano Hospital	—	—	Waimano Home Road
Route 7212	1.008	1.622	Waimano Home Road (Route 7211)	Kamehameha Highway (Route 99)	—	—	Kuala Street
Route 7225	1.222	1.967	Waimano Home Road (Route 7211)	Komo Mai Drive (Route 7243)	—	—	Hoʻomalu Street
Route 7226	0.249	0.401	Kamehameha Highway (Route 99)	Hoʻomalu Street (Route 7225)	—	—	Puʻu Poni Street
Route 7228	0.188	0.303	Kuala Street (Route 7212)	Kamehameha Highway (Route 99)	—	—	Acacia Road
Route 7243	2.919	4.698	ʻAumakua Street	Kaʻahele Street (Route 7251)	—	—	Komo Mai Drive
Route 7244	1.794	2.887	Kamehameha Highway (Route 99)	0.10 mi north of Iho Place	—	—	Kaʻōnohi Street
Route 7245	1.652	2.659	Moanalua Road (Route 7210)	ʻAiea Heights Drive (Route 7246)	—	—	Kaʻamilo Street
Route 7246	2.645	4.257	Moanalua Road (Route 7210)	Keaīwa Heiau State Recreation Area	—	—	ʻAiea Heights Drive
Route 7247	2.079	3.346	Waimano Home Road (Route 7211)	Waimano Home Road (Route 7211)	—	—	Hoʻolauleʻa Street
Route 7248	0.806	1.297	ʻAiea Heights Drive (Route 7246)	Kahuapaʻani Street (Route 7241)	—	—	Ulune Street
Route 7249	0.350	0.563	Kamehameha Highway (Route 99)	Lehua Elementary School Access Road	—	—	Lehua Street
Route 7250	1.005	1.617	Kamehameha Highway (Route 99)	Komo Mai Drive (Route 7243)	—	—	Kaʻahumanu Street
Route 7251	1.857	2.989	Moanalua Road (Route 7210)	0.2 mi past Hiliu Place	—	—	Kaʻahele Street
Route 7260	0.146	0.235	Kamehameha Highway (Route 99)	Moanalua Road (Route 7210)	—	—	Honomanu Street
Route 7261	0.414	0.666	Moanalua Road (Route 7210)	Kaʻōnohi Street (Route 7244)	—	—	Moanalua Loop
Route 7262	0.381	0.613	Hekaha Street (Route 7263)	Kamehameha Highway (Route 99)	—	—	Kanuku Street
Route 7263	0.420	0.676	Kamehameha Highway (Route 99)	Moanalua Road (Route 7210)	—	—	Hekaha Street
Route 7311	3.437	5.531	Puʻuloa Road (Route 7310)	Kamehameha Highway (Route 99)	—	—	Salt Lake Boulevard
Route 7341	0.792	1.275	Moanalua Freeway (H-201)	Nimitz Highway (Route 92)	—	—	Kikowaena Street, Āhua Street
Route 7342	0.252	0.406	Puʻuloa Road (Route 7310)	Āhua Street (Route 7341)	—	—	Pūkōloa Street
Route 7343	0.516	0.830	Salt Lake Boulevard (Route 7311)	Nimitz Highway (Route 92)	—	—	Arizona Road, Camp Catlin Road
Route 7344	1.467	2.361	Moanalua Freeway (H-201)	Ala Noe Place	—	—	Ala Aolani Street
Route 7346	2.11	3.40	Jarret White Road (Route 7345)	Middle Street (Route 7414)	—	—	Ala Mahamoe Street, Kaua Street
Route 7347	0.330	0.531	Salt Lake Boulevard (Route 7311)	Likini Street (Route 7348)	—	—	Ala Lilikoi Street
Route 7348	2.346	3.776	Salt Lake Boulevard (Route 7311)	Ala Napunani Street (Route 7349)	—	—	Pakini Street, Likini Street
Route 7349	1.320	2.124	Salt Lake Boulevard (Route 7311)	Ala Aolani Street (Route 7344)	—	—	Ala Napunani Street
Route 7402	5.195	8.361	Nuuanu Avenue	Harding Avenue (Route 7842)	—	—	South King Street
Route 7410	0.712	1.146	Middle Street (Route 7415)	Nuuanu Avenue	—	—	North King Street
Route 7411	1.115	1.794	School Street (Route 7414)	Nimitz Highway (Route 92)	—	—	Houghtailing Street, Waiakamilo Road
Route 7412	1.000	1.609	Wyllie Street (Route 7446)	H-1	—	—	Liliha Street
Route 7414	0.41	0.66	Lusitania Street (Route 7521)	Kaua Street (Route 7346)	—	—	School Street, Middle Street: only official, numbered county route on Oahu
Route 7420	0.174	0.280	King Street (Route 7402)	Vineyard Boulevard (Route 98)	—	—	Pālama Street
Route 7425	0.651	1.048	King Street (Route 7402)	Nimitz Highway (Route 92)	—	—	Iwilei Road, Pacific Street
Route 7430	0.689	1.109	Nimitz Highway (Route 92)	Sand Island Access Road (Route 64)	—	—	Kalihi Street, ʻAuiki Street
Route 7441	1.793	2.886	Likelike Highway (Route 63)	Kalaepaʻa Drive	—	—	Kalihi Street
Route 7442	0.682	1.098	School Street (Route 7414)	Likelike Highway (Route 63)	—	—	Kamehameha IV Road
Route 7443	0.128	0.206	Likelike Highway (Route 63)	Kalihi Street (Route 7441)	—	—	Nalanieha Street
Route 7444	0.587	0.945	Makanani Drive (Route 7445)	School Street (Route 7414)	—	—	Kēalia Drive, Hillcrest Street, Houghtailing Street
Route 7445	1.314	2.115	Nuʻuanu Avenue (Route 7522)	Kēalia Drive (Route 7444)	—	—	Judd Street, Iholena Street, Lolena Street, Makanani Drive
Route 7446	2.028	3.264	Liliha Street (Route 7412)	Hoʻomaikaʻi Street	—	—	Wyllie Street, ʻĀlewa Drive
Route 7447	0.388	0.624	School Street (Route 7414)	Iholena Street (Route 7445)	—	—	Lanakila Avenue, Judd Street
Route 7448	0.232	0.373	Nimitz Highway (Route 92)	Dillingham Boulevard (Route 7401)	—	—	Puʻuhale Road
Route 7450	0.568	0.914	Nimitz Highway (Route 92)	King Street (Route 7410)	—	—	Mokauea Street
Route 7501	0.288	0.463	Ala Moana Boulevard (Route 92)	Kapiʻolani Boulevard (Route 7503)	—	—	Atkinson Drive
Route 7502	3.311	5.329	University Avenue (Route 7615)	King Street (Route 7402)	—	—	Beretania Street
Route 7503	3.113	5.010	South Street (Route 7510)	Waiʻalae Avenue (Route 7801)	—	—	Kapiʻolani Boulevard
Route 7504	0.563	0.906	Nimitz Highway (Route 92)	Pali Highway (Route 7505)	—	—	Alakea Street, Queen Emma Street, Kukui Street
Route 7505	0.600	0.966	Vineyard Boulevard (Route 98)	Nimitz Highway (Route 92)	—	—	Pali Highway, Bishop Street
Route 7510	1.093	1.759	Ala Moana Boulevard (Route 92)	Vineyard Boulevard (Route 98)	—	—	South Street, Alapaʻi Street, Lusitania Street
Route 7511	1.148	1.848	Ala Moana Boulevard (Route 92)	Prospect Street (Route 7518)	—	—	Ward Avenue
Route 7512	1.367	2.200	Nehoa Street (Route 7518)	Piʻikoi Street (Route 7513)	—	—	Pensacola Street, Waimanu Street
Route 7513	1.362	2.192	Ala Moana Boulevard (Route 92)	Pensacola Street (Route 7512)	—	—	Piʻikoi Street
Route 7514	0.885	1.424	Kapiʻolani Boulevard (Route 7503)	Wilder Avenue (Route 7525)	—	—	Keʻeaumoku Street
Route 7515	1.264	2.034	Kamakeʻe Street (Route 7552)	Nimitz Highway (Route 92)	—	—	Queen Street
Route 7516	0.956	1.539	H-1	Ala Moana Boulevard (Route 92)	—	—	Punchbowl Street
Route 7517	0.936	1.506	Lusitania Street (Route 7521)	Nehoa Street (Route 7518)	—	—	ʻĀuwaiolimu Street
Route 7518	1.797	2.892	Lusitania Street (Route 7521)	Punahou Street (Route 7614)	—	—	ʻIolani Avenue, Prospect Street, Nehoa Street
Route 7519	0.881	1.418	Alapaʻi Street (Route 7510)	Keʻeaumoku Street (Route 7514)	—	—	Kīnaʻu Street
Route 7520	0.100	0.161	Nuʻuanu Avenue (Route 7522)	Pali Highway (Route 7505)	—	—	Kukui Street
Route 7521	0.815	1.312	School Street (Route 7414)	Nuʻuanu Avenue (Route 7522)	—	—	Lusitania Street, Pauoa Road
Route 7522	1.691	2.721	Wyllie Street (Route 7524)	Nimitz Highway (Route 92)	—	—	Nuʻuanu Avenue
Route 7523	0.316	0.509	Kukui Street (Route 7504)	School Street (Route 7414)	—	—	Queen Emma Street
Route 7524	0.262	0.422	Liliha Street (Route 7412)	Nuʻuanu Avenue (Route 7522)	—	—	Wyllie Street
Route 7525	1.266	2.037	Dole Street (Route 7611)	Pensacola Street (Route 7512)	—	—	Wilder Avenue
Route 7526	0.62	1.00	Ward Avenue (Route 7511)	H-1 exit 23	—	—	Lunalilo Street, unsigned
Route 7527	0.311	0.501	Nimitz Highway (Route 92)	Beretania Street (Route 7502)	—	—	Bethel Street
Route 7528	1.138	1.831	Punchbowl Street (Route 7516)	Ala Moana Boulevard (Route 92)	—	—	Pohukaina Street, Kamani Street, Auahi Street, Queen Street
Route 7530	0.266	0.428	Rycroft Street	Kapiʻolani Boulevard (Route 7503)	—	—	Sheridan Street
Route 7541	0.404	0.650	Kapiʻolani Boulevard (Route 7503)	King Street (Route 7402)	—	—	Kaheka Street
Route 7542	1.04	1.67	Hala Drive	Pali Highway (Route 61)	—	—	Keola Street, Kuakini Street
Route 7543	0.559	0.900	Richards Street (Route 7544)	King Street (Route 7402)	—	—	Hotel Street
Route 7544	0.209	0.336	Beretania Street (Route 7502)	King Street (Route 7042)	—	—	Richards Street
Route 7545	2.233	3.594	Pauoa Road (Route 7521)	End of route	—	—	Pacific Heights Road
Route 7546	1.877	3.021	Pacific Heights Road (Route 7545)	Lusitania Street (Route 7521)	—	—	Booth Road, Kekuanoni Street, Kapulei Street, Pauoa Road
Route 7547	2.060	3.315	ʻĀuwaiolimu Street (Route 7517)	Nehoa Street (Route 7518)	—	—	Hoʻokui Street, Puowaina Drive, Tantalus Drive, Makiki Heights Drive, Mott Smith Drive
Route 7548	0.656	1.056	Ala Moana Boulevard (Route 92)	King Street (Route 7402)	—	—	Cooke Street
Route 7549	1.392	2.240	Pensacola Street (Route 7512)	Isenberg Street (Route 7643)	—	—	Young Street
Route 7550	0.285	0.459	Wilder Avenue (Route 7525)	Nehoa Street (Route 7518)	—	—	Keʻeaumoku Street
Route 7552	0.342	0.550	Ala Moana Boulevard (Route 92)	Kapiʻolani Boulevard (Route 7503)	—	—	Kamakeʻe Street
Route 7553	0.377	0.607	Kekuanoni Street (Route 7546)	2000 feet past Kekuanoni Street	—	—	Booth Road
Route 7610	0.947	1.524	University Avenue (Route 7615)	Kapahulu Avenue (Route 7810)	—	—	Date Street
Route 7611	1.351	2.174	Waiʻalae Avenue (Route 7801)	Wilder Avenue (Route 7525)	—	—	St. Louis Drive, Dole Street
Route 7612	3.069	4.939	Beretania Street (Route 7502)	Pākī Avenue (Route 7713)	—	—	Kalākaua Avenue
Route 7613	1.362	2.192	Kalākaua Avenue (Route 7612)	University Avenue (Route 7646)	—	—	McCully Street, Metcalf Street
Route 7614	0.841	1.353	Kalākaua Avenue (Route 7612)	Nehoa Street (Route 7518)	—	—	Philip Street, Punahou Street
Route 7615	0.895	1.440	Kapiʻolani Boulevard (Route 7503)	Metcalf Street (Route 7613)	—	—	University Avenue
Route 7641	0.91	1.46	University Avenue (Route 7615)	Punahou Street (Route 7614)	—	—	Date Street, Citron Street, Kuikahi Street, Philip Street
Route 7642	2.042	3.286	Mānoa Road (Route 7645)	Woodlawn Drive (N junction)	—	—	East Mānoa Road, Alani Drive
Route 7643	0.506	0.814	Kapiʻolani Boulevard (Route 7503)	Beretania Street (Route 7502)	—	—	Isenberg Street
Route 7644	0.374	0.602	Mānoa Road (Route 7645)	East Mānoa Road (Route 7642)	—	—	Lowrey Avenue
Route 7645	2.481	3.993	Nehoa Street (Route 7518)	Waʻakaua Street	—	—	Mānoa Road
Route 7646	1.283	2.065	Metcalf Street (Route 7613)	Mānoa Road (Route 7645)	—	—	University Avenue, Oʻahu Avenue
Route 7647	2.121	3.413	Dole Street (Route 7611)	St. Louis Drive	—	—	St. Louis Drive, Bertram Street, Noah Street, Alencastre Street
Route 7648	0.143	0.230	Wilder Avenue (Route 7525)	H-1	—	—	Alexander Street
Route 7649	0.376	0.605	Punahou Street (Route 7614)	Metcalf Street (Route 7613)	—	—	Dole Street
Route 7710	1.568	2.523	Kapahulu Avenue (Route 7810)	Kalākaua Avenue (Route 7612)	—	—	Ala Wai Boulevard
Route 7711	1.159	1.865	Kalākaua Avenue (Route 7612)	Kapahulu Avenue (Route 7810)	—	—	Kūhiō Avenue
Route 7712	0.995	1.601	Kalākaua Avenue (Route 7612)	Trousseau Street	—	—	Monsarrat Avenue
Route 7713	0.949	1.527	Diamond Head Road (Route 7811)	Kapahulu Avenue (Route 7610)	—	—	Pākī Avenue
Route 7714	0.086	0.138	Ala Wai Boulevard (Route 7710)	Kalākaua Avenue (Route 7612)	—	—	Niu Street
Route 7715	0.109	0.175	Kalākaua Avenue (Route 7612)	Ala Wai Boulevard (Route 7710)	—	—	Paʻū Street
Route 7720	0.228	0.367	Kalia Road (Route 7743)	Kalākaua Avenue (Route 7612)	—	—	Saratoga Road
Route 7725	0.190	0.306	Kalākaua Avenue (Route 7612)	Ala Wai Boulevard (Route 7710)	—	—	Kalaimoku Street
Route 7741	0.37	0.60	Kalākaua Avenue (Route 7612)	Ala Wai Boulevard (Route 7710)	—	—	Kaʻiulani Street, Kānekapōlei Street
Route 7743	0.572	0.921	Ala Moana Boulevard (Route 92)	Lewers Street (Route 7744)	—	—	Kalia Road
Route 7744	0.416	0.669	Kalia Road (Route 7743)	Ala Wai Boulevard (Route 7710)	—	—	Lewers Street
Route 7801	2.02	3.25	Kapahulu Avenue (Route 7810)	Kīlauea Avenue (Route 7812)	—	—	Waiʻalae Avenue, unsigned
Route 7810	1.550	2.494	Kalākaua Avenue (Route 7612)	Waiʻalae Avenue (Route 7801)	—	—	Kapahulu Avenue
Route 7811	2.731	4.395	Trousseau Street	Pākī Avenue (Route 7713)	—	—	Diamond Head Road
Route 7812	2.231	3.590	Waiʻalae Avenue (Route 7801)	6th Avenue (Route 7852)	—	—	Kīlauea Avenue
Route 7813	0.207	0.333	H-1	Waiʻalae Avenue (Route 7801)	—	—	6th Avenue
Route 7814	0.818	1.316	Harding Avenue (Route 7842)	Diamond Head Road (Route 7811)	—	—	18th Avenue
Route 7841	0.620	0.998	Monsarrat Avenue (Route 7712)	Kapahulu Avenue (Route 7810)	—	—	Campbell Avenue
Route 7842	1.769	2.847	21st Avenue (Route 7856)	Kapiʻolani Boulevard (Route 7503)	—	—	Harding Avenue
Route 7843	1.453	2.338	Kīlauea Avenue (Route 7862)	Kāhala Avenue (Route 7844)	—	—	Hunakai Street
Route 7844	1.488	2.395	Diamond Head Road (Route 7811)	Kealaʻolu Avenue (Route 7863)	—	—	Kāhala Avenue
Route 7845	0.661	1.064	Kapiʻolani Boulevard (Route 7503)	6th Avenue (Route 7852)	—	—	Kaimukī Avenue
Route 7846	0.248	0.399	Waiʻalae Avenue (Route 7801)	Pāhoa Avenue (Route 7848)	—	—	Koko Head Avenue
Route 7847	0.267	0.430	Kapahulu Avenue (Route 7810)	6th Avenue (Route 7852)	—	—	Moʻoheau Avenue
Route 7848	0.992	1.596	Koko Head Avenue (Route 7846)	Kīlauea Avenue (Route 7812)	—	—	Pāhoa Road
Route 7849	1.855	2.985	19th Avenue (Route 7853)	Waiʻalae Avenue (Route 7801)	—	—	Pālolo Avenue
Route 7850	0.116	0.187	Waiʻalae Avenue (Route 7801)	Harding Avenue (Route 7842)	—	—	5th Avenue
Route 7851	0.158	0.254	Waiʻalae Avenue (Route 7801)	Pālolo Avenue (Route 7849)	—	—	6th Avenue
Route 7852	0.524	0.843	H-1	Alohea Avenue (Route 7864)	—	—	6th Avenue
Route 7853	1.850	2.977	Pālolo Avenue (Route 7848)	Waiʻalae Avenue (Route 7801)	—	—	10th Avenue
Route 7854	0.611	0.983	Kīlauea Avenue (Route 7812)	Waiʻalae Avenue (Route 7801)	—	—	10th Avenue
Route 7855	0.150	0.241	Waiʻalae Avenue (Route 7801)	H-1	—	—	11th Avenue
Route 7856	0.176	0.283	Harding Avenue (Route 7842)	Waiʻalae Avenue (Route 7801)	—	—	21st Avenue
Route 7857	2.240	3.605	Waiʻalae Avenue (Route 7801)	Maunalani Circle	—	—	Sierra Drive
Route 7858	2.777	4.469	Maunalani Circle	Kīlauea Avenue (Route 7812)	—	—	Lurline Drive, Monterey Drive, Paula Drive, Koko Drive, 16th Avenue
Route 7859	0.565	0.909	Kīlauea Avenue (Route 7812)	Kāhala Avenue (Route 7844)	—	—	ʻElepaio Street
Route 7862	0.681	1.096	ʻAkiʻaki Place	Waiʻalae Avenue (Route 7801)	—	—	Kīlauea Avenue
Route 7863	0.678	1.091	Waiʻalae Avenue (Route 7801)	Kāhala Avenue (Route 7844)	—	—	Kealaʻolu Avenue
Route 7864	0.615	0.990	6th Avenue (Route 7852)	Makapuʻu Avenue (Route 7865)	—	—	Alohea Avenue
Route 7865	0.313	0.504	Diamond Head Road (Route 7811)	Kīlauea Avenue (Route 7812)	—	—	Makapuʻu Avenue
Route 7910	1.726	2.778	Kalanianaʻole Highway (Route 72)	Hawaiʻi Kai Drive (Route 7911)	—	—	Lunalilo Home Road
Route 7911	4.54	7.31	Kalanianaʻole Highway (Route 72)	Kealahou Street (Route 7949)	—	—	Hawaiʻi Kai Drive
Route 7941	1.703	2.741	Kalanianaʻole Highway (Route 72)	ʻAlaeloa Street	—	—	ʻĀina Koa Avenue, Halekoa Drive
Route 7942	1.126	1.812	Kalanianaʻole Highway (Route 72)	Kalanianaʻole Highway (Route 72)	—	—	West Hind Drive, East Hind Drive
Route 7943	1.419	2.284	West Hind Drive (Route 7942)	East Hind Drive (Route 7942)	—	—	Nohu Street, Hao Street, Ani Street, Hind Iuka Drive
Route 7944	0.822	1.323	Kalanianaʻole Highway (W junction) (Route 72)	Kalanianaʻole Highway (E junction) (Route 72)	—	—	Halemaʻumaʻu Street
Route 7945	0.828	1.333	Kalanianaʻole Highway (Route 72)	Kalanianaʻole Highway (Route 72)	—	—	ʻElelupe Road, Kuliʻouʻou Road
Route 7947	0.859	1.382	Kalanianaʻole Highway (Route 72)	Kalanianaʻole Highway (Route 72)	—	—	Lunalilo Home Road, Nāwiliwili Street
Route 7948	1.320	2.124	Kalanianaʻole Highway (Route 72)	Kihi Street	—	—	Laukahi Street
Route 7949	1.684	2.710	Kalanianaʻole Highway (Route 72)	Ipuʻai Street	—	—	Kealahou Street
Route 7950	0.661	1.064	Kalanianaʻole Highway (Route 72)	Hawaiʻi Kai Drive (Route 7911)	—	—	Keāhole Street
Route 7951	0.352	0.566	Hawaiʻi Kai Drive (Route 7911)	Lunalilo Home Road (Route 7910)	—	—	Wailua Street
Route 7952	0.817	1.315	Hawaiʻi Kai Drive (Route 7911)	ʻĀinapō Street	—	—	Hahaʻione Street
Route 7953	0.413	0.665	Hawaiʻi Kai Drive (Route 7911)	Hahaʻione Street (Route 7952)	—	—	Pepeʻekeo Street
Route 7954	0.622	1.001	Pepeʻekeo Street (Route 7953)	Hahaʻione Street (Route 7952)	—	—	ʻĀinapō Street
Route 8541	0.669	1.077	Farrington Highway (Route 93)	Waiʻanae Valley Road (Route 8542)	—	—	Old Government Road, Plantation Road
Route 8542	2.514	4.046	Farrington Highway (Route 93)	Haleahi Road	—	—	Waiʻanae Valley Road
Route 8543	1.104	1.777	Farrington Highway (Route 93)	Halona Road	—	—	Lualualei Homestead Road
Route 8741	1.454	2.340	Farrington Highway (Route 93)	Paʻakea Road (Route 8755)	—	—	Hakimo Road
Route 8743	1.363	2.194	Farrington Highway (Route 93)	Nānākuli Avenue (Route 8744)	—	—	Haleakalā Avenue
Route 8744	1.324	2.131	Farrington Highway (Route 93)	Haleakalā Avenue (Route 8743)	—	—	Nānākuli Avenue
Route 8750	0.808	1.300	Farrington Highway (Route 93)	Pakeke Street	—	—	Kaukama Road
Route 8755	2.741	4.411	Farrington Highway (Route 93)	Hakimo Road (Route 8741)	—	—	Maʻiliʻili Road, Paʻakea Road
Route 8760	0.104	0.167	Farrington Highway (Route 93)	Lāhaina Street	—	—	Makaha Valley Road
Route 8810	3.37	5.42	Interstate H-1 (Makakilo interchange)	Interstate H-1 (Kualakai Parkway interchange)	—	—	Makakilo Drive
Route 8815	1.196	1.925	Makakilo Drive (SE junction)	Makakilo Drive (NW junction) (Route 8810)	—	—	Palailai Street, Nohohale Street
Route 8905	0.470	0.756	Aliʻinui Drive (Route 8910)	Farrington Highway (Route 93)	—	—	Kolo Drive
Route 8910	1.605	2.583	Farrington Highway (Route 93)	Kolo Drive (Route 8905)	—	—	Aliʻinui Drive
Route 8915	0.916	1.474	Farrington Highway (Route 9107)	Roosevelt Avenue (Route 8940)	—	—	Kamokila Boulevard
Route 8918	0.462	0.744	Kapolei Parkway (Route 8920)	Interstate H-1	—	—	Wakea Street
Route 8920	7.747	12.468	Aliʻinui Drive (Route 8910)	Papipi Road (Route 7148)	—	—	Kapolei Parkway
Route 8925	0.571	0.919	Farrington Highway (Route 9107)	Kamaʻaha Loop	—	—	Kealanani Avenue
Route 9107	4.07	6.55	West access to Old Fort Weaver Road	Kamokila Boulevard (Route 8915)	—	—	Unsigned; part of Farrington Highway
Route 9262	2.531	4.073	Weed Junction	Crozier Loop	—	—	Waialua Beach Road
Route 9263	1.594	2.565	Kamehameha Highway (Route 8300)	Waialua Beach Road (Route 9262)	—	—	Haleʻiwa Road
Route 9265	0.854	1.374	Waialua Beach Road (Route 9262)	Farrington Highway (Route 930)	—	—	Goodale Avenue
Route 9270	0.50	0.80	Farrington Highway (Route 930)	Kealohanui Street	—	—	Puʻuiki Street
Route 9274	0.758	1.220	Kamehameha Highway (Route 8300)	Haleʻiwa Road (Route 9263)	—	—	Paʻalaʻa Road
Route 9275	0.284	0.457	Waialua Beach Road (Route 9262)	Kukea Circle	—	—	Kuoha Street
Route 9276	0.184	0.296	Waialua Beach Road (Route 9262)	Kaui Street	—	—	Komo Street
Route 9280	2.267	3.648	Kamehameha Highway (Route 83)	Kanalani Place	—	—	Pūpūkea Road
Route 9285	0.31	0.50	Kamehameha Highway (Route 83)	End of road	—	—	Pualalea Street
Former

== Temporary Federal routes ==
During World War II, a temporary Federal route numbering system was set up on the island of Oahu. They were used to assist military personnel not accustomed to the Hawaiian street names during the time of Martial law in the Territory of Hawaiʻi from 1941 to 1945. Though marked with U.S. Route shields, they were never part of the United States Numbered Highway System.

Number	Length (mi)	Length (km)	Southern or western terminus	Northern or eastern terminus	Formed	Removed	Notes
Route 1	—	—	Route 2 / Route 13 in Honolulu	Route 2 / Route 223 near Waialua	1941	1945	South Vineyard Boulevard » Wai‘alae Avenue » Kalaniana‘ole Highway » Kailua Road » Oneawa Street » Mōkapu Boulevard » Kāne‘ohe Bay Drive » Kamehameha Highway
Route 2	—	—	Route 1 / Route 13 in Honolulu	Route 1 / Route 223 near Waialua	1941	1945	Nimitz Highway » Kamehameha Highway
Route 13	—	—	Route 1 / Route 2 in Honolulu	Route 1 in Kailua	1941	1945	Bishop Street » Pali Highway
Route 220	—	—	Route 223 in Nānākuli	Route 2 in Pearl City	1941	1945	Farrington Highway
Route 223	—	—	Route 220 in Nānākuli	Route 1 / Route 2 near Waialua	1941	1945	Farrington Highway (road permanently closed at Ka‘ena Point)
Route 230	—	—	Route 1 in Kāneʻohe	Route 1 in Kailua	1941	1945	Kailua Road » Oneawa Street » Mōkapu Boulevard » Kāne‘ohe Bay Drive
