= Hawaii Route 570 =

State highway in Hawaii, United States

Hawaii Route 570
- Ahukini Road

Route information
- Maintained by HDOT
- Length: 1.1 mi (1.8 km)

Major junctions
- West end: Route 56 in Lihue
- East end: Makes a loop near Lihue Airport

Location
- Country: United States
- State: Hawaii

Highway system
- Routes in Hawaii
← Route 560	→ Route 580

Route 570 is a one-mile (1.6 km) road that stretches from Route 56 in Lihue to Lihue Airport on the island of Kauaʻi. Before the construction of Route 51 in the 1980s, the road provided primary access to Lihue Airport with the north and eastern shores of the Kauai.

== Route description ==
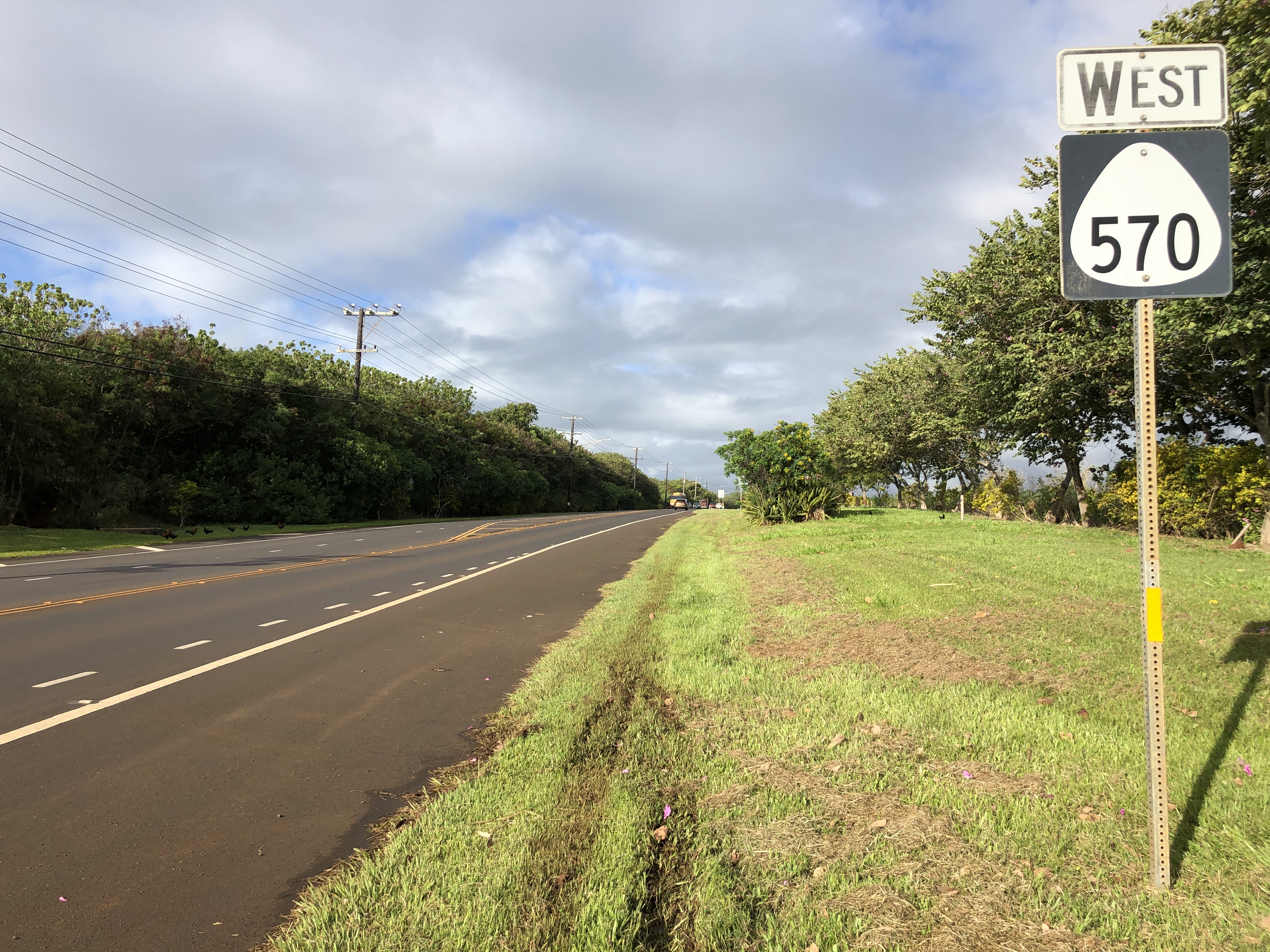
Route 570 westbound at Route 51 in Lihue

Following the intersection with Hawaii Route 56, Hawaii Route 570 the heads east and comes to a major intersection with Hawaii Route 51. Hawaii Route 570 then enters into the property of Lihue Airport and makes a complete route around the terminal entrance with access to car rental areas and private hangars also.

== Major intersections ==
The entire route is in Līhuʻe, Kauaʻi County.

mi	km	Destinations	Notes
0.0	0.0	Route 56 – Poʻipū, Waimea, Hanalei	
1.1	1.8	Route 51 – Kapaʻa, Nawiliwili	
1.1	1.8	Lihue Airport	Terminus at entrance to airport
1.000 mi = 1.609 km; 1.000 km = 0.621 mi
