= Keokea, Hawaii =

There are two places named Kēōkea in the U.S. state of Hawaii:

- Kēōkea, Hawaii County, Hawaii
- Kēōkea, Maui County, Hawaii
