= Hawaii Route 520 =

State highway on Kauaʻi, Hawaii, US

Hawaii Route 520
- Route 520 highlighted in red

Route information
- Maintained by HDOT
- Length: 6.398 mi (10.297 km)

Major junctions
- North end: Route 50 near Knudsen Gap
- South end: Koloa Landing

Location
- Country: United States
- State: Hawaii
- Counties: Kauaʻi

Highway system
- Routes in Hawaii
← Route 490	→ Route 530

Route 520 is the road which connects Kōloa and Poʻipū to Hawaii Route 50, the principal highway of the southern part of Kauaʻi island in the state of Hawaii. It is under the jurisdiction of Kauaʻi County, though it is numbered within the state numbering system.

== Route description ==
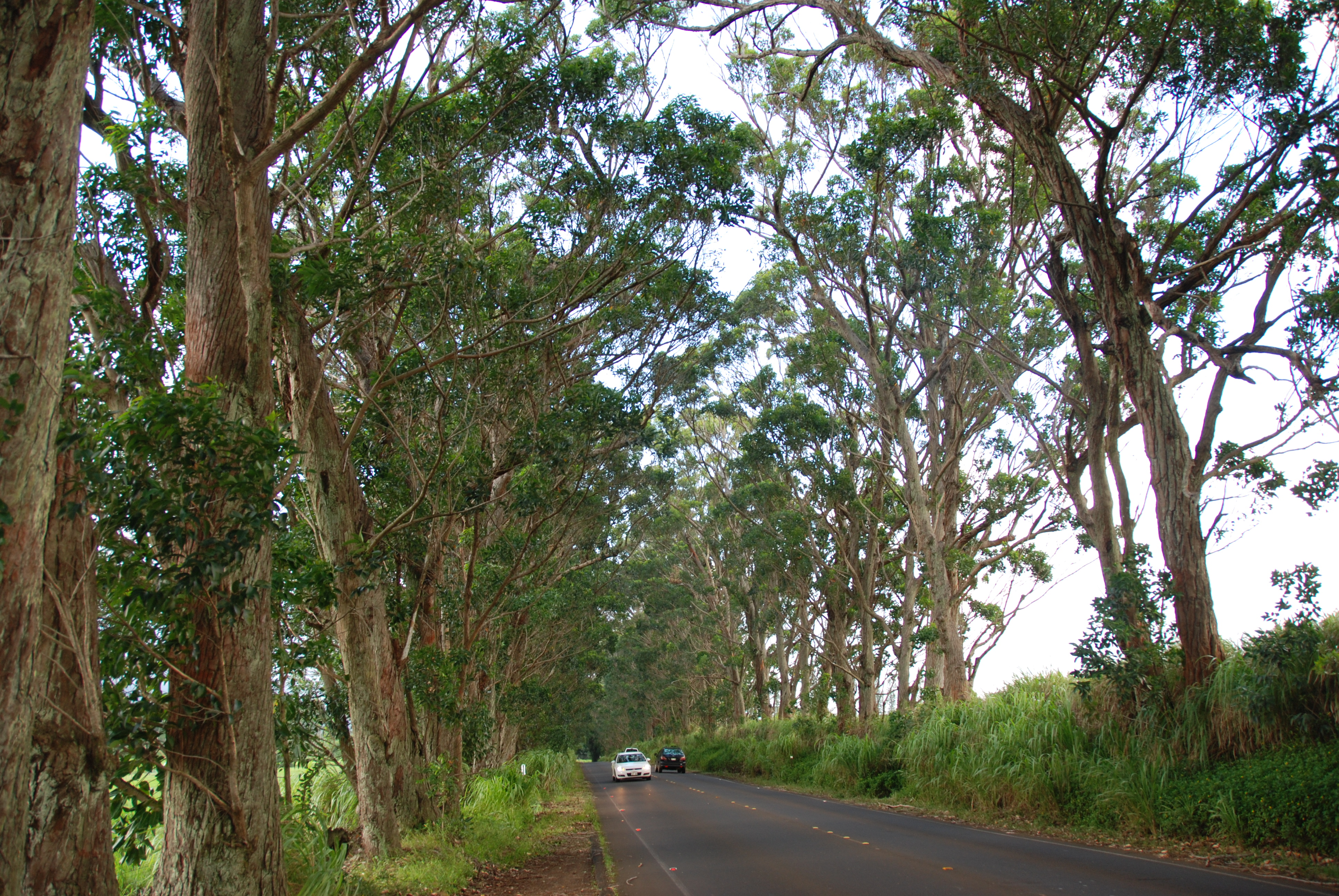
Tree Tunnel on Route 250, July 2008

Immediately south of where the road meets Route 50, the road (there known as Maluhia Road, meaning "peaceful") enters the Tunnel of Trees, a stand of Eucalyptus robusta, Swamp Mahogany. The stand, which lines either side of the road for more than a mile, providing shade and a characteristic smell. There are two versions of its planting. According to some, the trees were brought here and planted by the Knudsen family, at the time the largest landowner in the area to help stabilize the then soggy road over Knudsen Pass. Another story is that they were planted by pineapple baron Walter Duncan McBryde, who planted them as a community project in 1911, using 500 leftover trees from his landscaping of his estate at Kukuiolono. Before the construction of the Kaumualiʻi Highway (Route 50), the tree tunnel was three times longer than its current size.

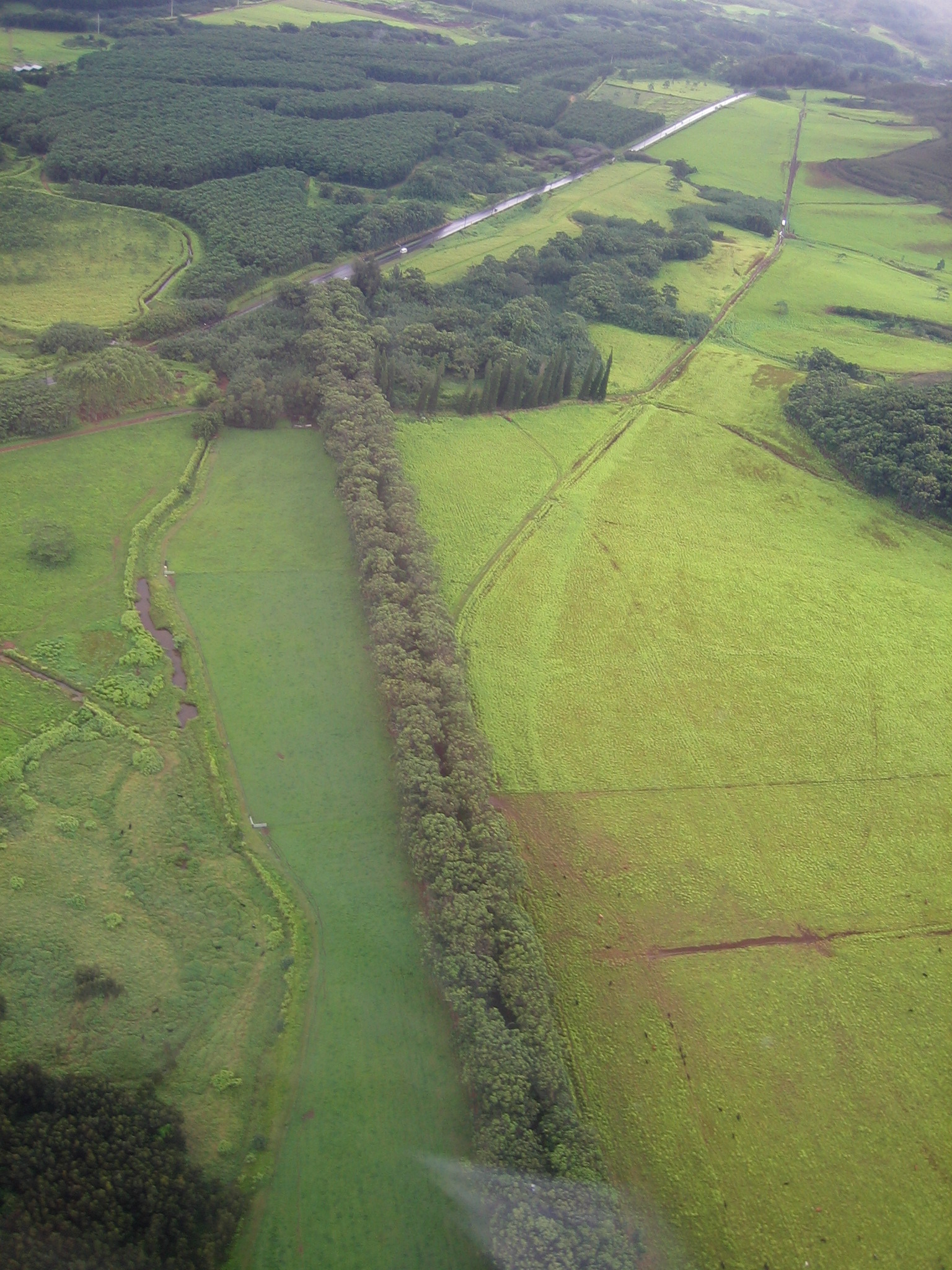
Aerial view of northern end of the Tunnel of Trees

As Road 520 enters Kōloa, on the west side is the remains of the original Kōloa sugar mill, commemorated by a plaque and sculpture, erected in 1985 to commemorate the 150th anniversary of commercial sugar production in Hawaii. The road forms a T with Kōloa Road at the center of Kōloa, and then continues to the south a few blocks further west under the name "Poʻipū Road." Kōloa Road continues west as Hawaii Route 530 continuing on south to Poʻipū. Poʻipū Road then splits off to the east to most of the town of Poʻipū. Route 520 then continues as Lāwaʻi Road briefly, before it splits to the west leads to Spouting Horn and the National Tropical Botanical Gardens. The final stretch of the highway is marked as Hoʻonani Road, and terminates at Kōloa Landing.

== History ==
The Maluhia Road section was formerly designated as Hawaii Route 52.

== Major intersections ==
The entire route is in Kauaʻi County.

Location	mi	km	Destinations	Notes
Poʻipū	0.000	0.000	Ala Kinoiki	
Kōloa	3.1	5.0	Route 530 west	
	6.398	10.297	Route 50 – Līhuʻe, Waimea	
1.000 mi = 1.609 km; 1.000 km = 0.621 mi

== See also ==
- List of highways numbered 520
