= Hawaii Route 550 =

State highway on Kauaʻi, Hawaii, US

Hawaii Route 550
- Route 550 highlighted in red

Route information
- Maintained by HDOT
- Length: 14.1 mi (22.7 km)

Major junctions
- South end: Route 50 in Waimea
- North end: Dead Ends at Koke'e State Park

Location
- Country: United States
- State: Hawaii

Highway system
- Routes in Hawaii
← Route 541	→ Route 560

Route 550 is a 14-mile-long (23 km) road stretching from Route 50 in Waimea to Kōkeʻe State Park on the island of Kauaʻi.

== Route description ==
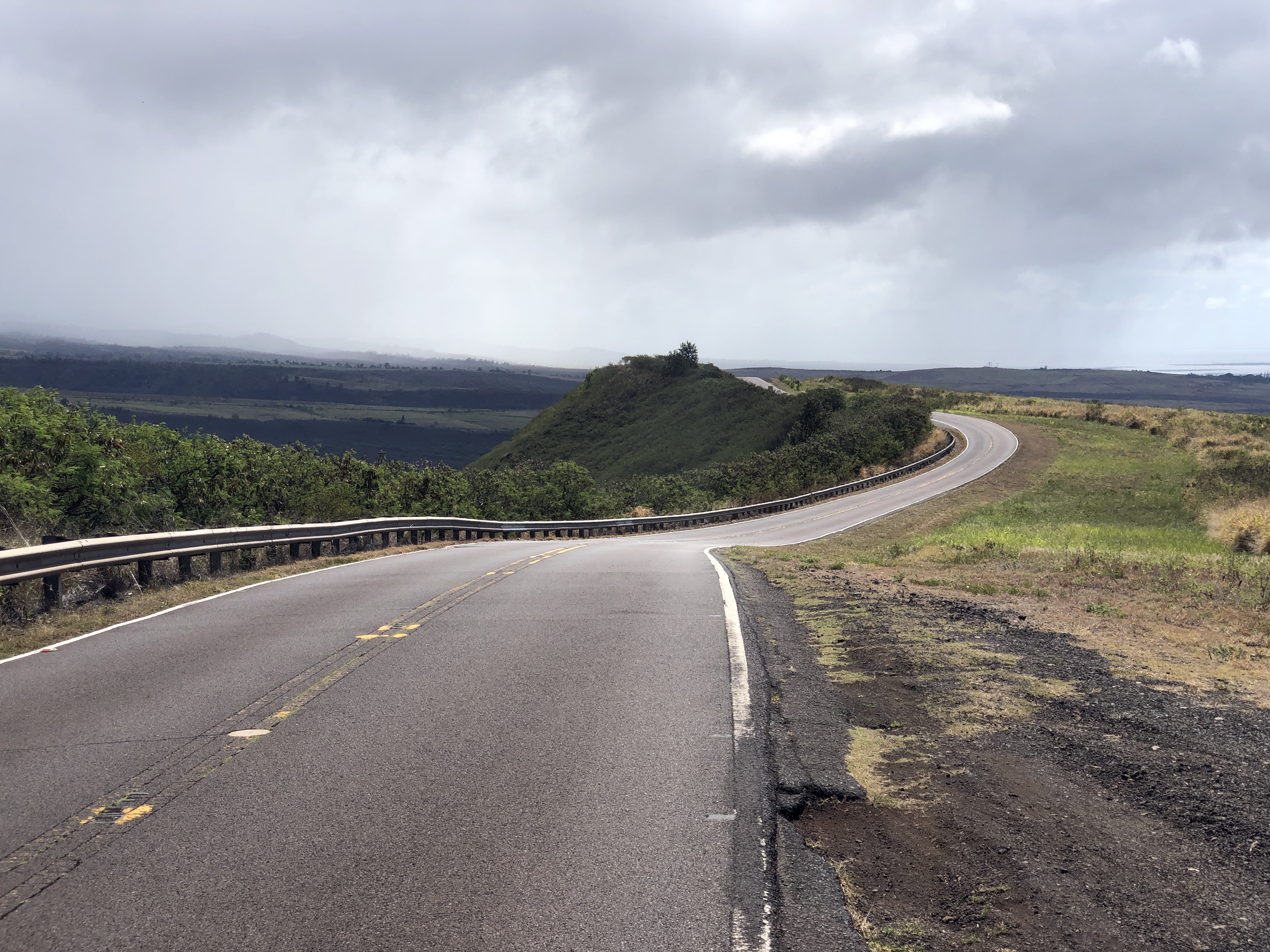
Route 550 southbound approaching Waimea

Leaving Waimea, Hawaii Route 550 increases in elevation to over two thousand feet, at times the road is winding and steep. For much of its length, Hawaii Route 550 is adjacent to Waimea Canyon.

== Major intersections ==
The entire route is in Kauaʻi County.

Location	mi	km	Destinations	Notes
Waimea	0.0	0.0	Route 50	Southern terminus of Route 550
			Kōkeʻe State Park	Northern terminus of Route 550
1.000 mi = 1.609 km; 1.000 km = 0.621 mi
