= Hawaii Route 50 =

State highway on Kauaʻi, Hawaii, US

Hawaii Route 50
- Kaumualiʻi Highway

Route information
- Maintained by HDOT
- Length: 32.9 mi (52.9 km)

Major junctions
- West end: Pacific Missile Range Facility
- East end: Route 56 in Lihue

Location
- Country: United States
- State: Hawaii
- Counties: Kauaʻi

Highway system
- Routes in Hawaii
← Route 44	→ Route 51

Route 50 is a 33-mile (53 km) road that stretches from Route 56 at the junction of Rice Street in Lihue to a point approximately 1/5 mile north of the northernmost entrance of the Pacific Missile Range Facility on the western shore of Kauai. It is the longest numbered road on the island of Kauaʻi and is named Kaumualiʻi Highway.

== Route description ==
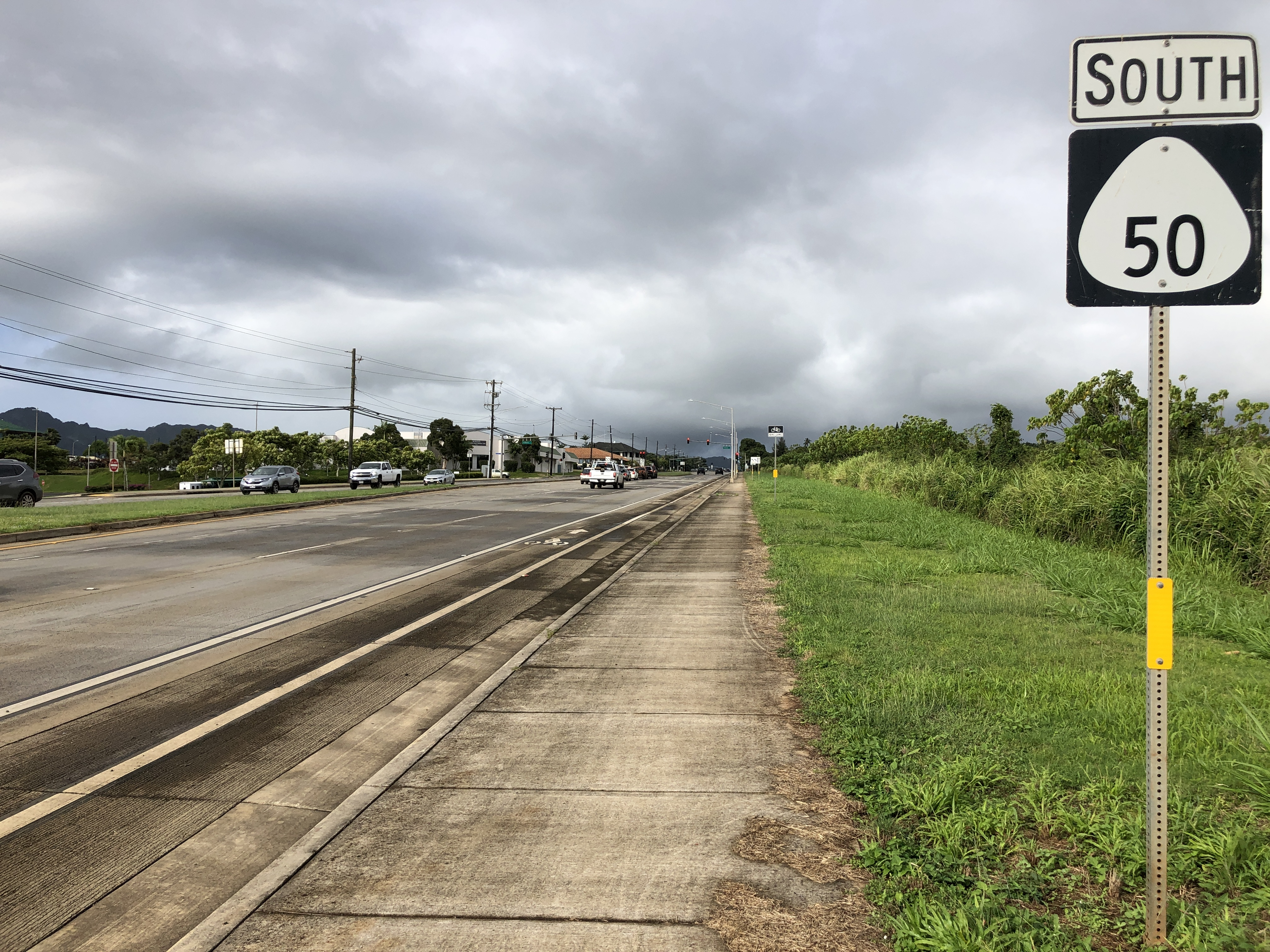
Route 50 southbound at Route 58 in Lihuʻe

Hawaii Route 50 begins in Lihuʻe and heads west. The road passes through the only major shopping center on the island at the intersection with Route 58. From there, the road passes through the countryside and several small communities. There are numerous agricultural farms and plantations set up along the route. The National Historic Landmark known as Russian Fort Elizabeth is located where the highway crosses the Waimea River.

The last major sugarcane plantation on Kauaʻi is along the route west of Waimea. West of Waimea, Route 50 serves only as an access road to 4 major sites: Pacific Missile Range Facility, Polihale Beach, Kekaha Town, and Waimea Canyon via Route 550. The only public services available west of Waimea are a collection of tourist shops and a convenience store at the base of Route 550. Route 50 is named after Kaumualiʻi, the last king of the island of Kauaʻi.

== Major intersections ==
The entire route is in Kauaʻi County.

Location	mi	km	Destinations	Notes
	0.0	0.0	Barking Sands Pacific Missile Range Facility Airport	Western terminus of Route 50
Kekaha	6.7	10.8	Route 552 north (Alae Road) – Waimea Canyon, Kōkeʻe State Park	Southern terminus of Route 552
Waimea	9.8	15.8	Route 550 north (Waimea Canyon Road)	Southern terminus of Route 550
ʻEleʻele	17.2	27.7	Route 540 east (Halewili Road) – McBryde Mill	Western terminus of Route 540
Kalāheo	20.7	33.3	Route 540 west (Halewili Road) – Numila	Eastern terminus of Route 540
Lāwaʻi	22.5	36.2	Route 530 south (Kōloa Road)	Northern terminus of Route 530
	26.3	42.3	Route 520 south (Maluhia Road) – Kōloa, Poʻipū	Northern terminus of Route 520
Līhuʻe	32.3	52.0	Route 58 east (Nawiliwili Road) – Nawiliwili, Kalapaki Beach	Western terminus of Route 58
Līhuʻe	32.9	52.9	Route 56 north (Kūhiō Highway) / Rice Street	Eastern terminus of Route 56
1.000 mi = 1.609 km; 1.000 km = 0.621 mi
