= Hawaii Route 58 =

State highway in Kauai County, Hawaii, United States

Hawaii Route 58

Route information
- Maintained by HDOT
- Length: 2.1 mi (3.4 km)

Major junctions
- North end: Route 50 in Lihue
- South end: Route 51 in Lihue

Location
- Country: United States
- State: Hawaii
- Counties: Kauaʻi

Highway system
- Routes in Hawaii
← Route 56	→ Route 61

Route 58 is a two-mile (3.2 km) road that stretches from Route 50 in Lihue to the junction of Wapaa Road with Hawaii 51 near Nawiliwili Harbor on Kauaʻi island.

== Route description ==
Route 58 begins at an intersection with Route 50 at the Kukui Grove Shopping Center, one of the few major shopping areas on Kauaʻi island. Called Nawiliwili road, it heads southeast and loses the grassy median to become a two lane road. Route 58 comes to an end at Wapaa Road while Route 51 (Rice Street) continues back north from the coast. About halfway down route 58 is the Grove Farm Museum. From the southern end of route 58, Niumalu Road provides access to Nawiliwili Beach Park and Niumalu Beach Park.

== Major intersection ==
The entire route is in Līhuʻe, Kauaʻi County.

mi	km	Destinations	Notes
0.0	0.0	Route 50	Western terminus of Route 58
2.1	3.4	Route 51 north	Eastern terminus of Route 58; southern terminus of Route 51
1.000 mi = 1.609 km; 1.000 km = 0.621 mi
