= Hawaii Route 51 =

State highway on Kauaʻi, Hawaii, US

Hawaii Route 51
- Kauai Veterans Memorial Highway - Kapule Highway

Route information
- Maintained by HDOT
- Length: 3.5 mi (5.6 km)
- Existed: 1955–present

Major junctions
- South end: Route 58 in Lihue
- North end: Route 56 in Lihue

Location
- Country: United States
- State: Hawaii
- Counties: Kauaʻi

Highway system
- Routes in Hawaii
← Route 50	→ Route 56

Route 51 is a three-mile (5 km) road that stretches from the junction Wapaa Road with Route 58 at the Nawiliwili Harbor in Lihue to Route 56 north of Lihue on The Garden Isle.

== Route description ==
After the junction with Wapaa Road, Route 51 is signed with Rice Street for less than a mile. Route 51 then splits off with Rice Street and becomes Kapule Highway where the final segment north of the airport was completed in 1988. The road intersects with Route 570 near the Lihue Airport. Heading north towards the eastern and northern towns of Kauai, Route 51 ends at the intersection with Route 56.

== Major intersections ==
The entire route is in Līhuʻe, Kauaʻi County.

mi	km	Destinations	Notes
0.0	0.0	Route 58 west	Southern terminus of Route 58; eastern terminus of Route 51
1.9	3.1	Route 570 east – Lihue Airport	Western terminus of Route 570
3.5	5.6	Route 56	Northern terminus of Route 51
1.000 mi = 1.609 km; 1.000 km = 0.621 mi
