= Hawaii Route 580 =

State highway on Kauaʻi, Hawaii, US

Hawaii Route 580
- Route 580 highlighted in red

Route information
- Maintained by HDOT
- Length: 4.83 mi (7.77 km)

Major junctions
- East end: Route 56 in Wailua
- West end: Dead ends south of Wailua Reservoir

Location
- Country: United States
- State: Hawaii

Highway system
- Routes in Hawaii
← Route 570	→ Route 583

Route 580 is a five-mile-long (8.0 km) road that stretches from Route 56 in Wailua to where the road is no longer serviced by Hawaii Department of Transportation just south of the Wailua Reservoir on the island of Kauaʻi.

== Route description ==
The starts at the intersection of Route 56 near the Kauai shorelines where the Pacific Ocean's tide comes on to the shore. Route 580 intersection with Route 56 is also at the corner of the famous Coco Palms Resort. Route 580 primarily follows the Wailua River as the road increases in elevation. It passes the outlook to 'Opaeka'a Falls. Route 580 mainly goes through residential areas and patchy forests as the road continues onshore. Route 580 abruptly comes to an end as the road crosses a creek near the reservoir. The continues on as a one lane dirt road, but is only recommended for vehicles who have four-wheel drive.

== Major intersections ==
The entire route is in Kauaʻi County.

Location	mi	km	Destinations	Notes
Wailua	0	0.0	Route 56	
Wailua Reservoir			Dead end	
1.000 mi = 1.609 km; 1.000 km = 0.621 mi
