= Hawaii Route 440 =

State highway on Lanai, Hawaii, US

Hawaii Route 440
- Kaumālapaʻu Highway; Mānele Road
- Route 440 highlighted in red

Route information
- Maintained by HDOT
- Length: 13.2 mi (21.2 km)

Major junctions
- West end: Kaumalapau Bay
- East end: Hulopue Beach Park

Location
- Country: United States
- State: Hawaii

Highway system
- Routes in Hawaii
← Route 380	→ Route 450

Hawaii Route 440 is a 13.2-mile-long (21.2 km) state highway on the island of Lanai in Hawaii.

== Route description ==
It is designated as the Kaumalapau Highway and Manele Road. Both termini are at the ocean, and not directly with other roads. The road begins at Manele Harbor and leads steeply uphill in a northerly direction to Lāna'i City. It has only regional importance, linking the tourist area on the south coast with the only town on the island and the Lanai Airport.

== Major junctions ==
The entire route is in Maui County.

Location	mi	km	Destinations	Notes
	0.0	0.0	Entrance to Lanai Oil Company facility	Kaumalapau Bay
	3.2	5.1	Lanai Airport entrance	
Lanai City	5.9	9.5	Kaumalapau Highway	
	13.2	21.2	Manele Small Boat Harbor entrance	Manele Harbor
1.000 mi = 1.609 km; 1.000 km = 0.621 mi
