= Gene Keliikuli =

Canadian football player (born 1943)

Profile
- Position: Guard

Personal information
- Born: June 24, 1943 (age 83); Lanai City, Hawaii, US
- Listed height: 6 ft 1 in (1.85 m)
- Listed weight: 260 lb (118 kg)

Career information
- College: Idaho State

Career history
- 1965: Edmonton Eskimos

Gene Keliikuli (born June 24, 1943) is a Canadian football player who played for the Edmonton Eskimos.
