= John Davenport Barrette =

United States Army general

John Barrette
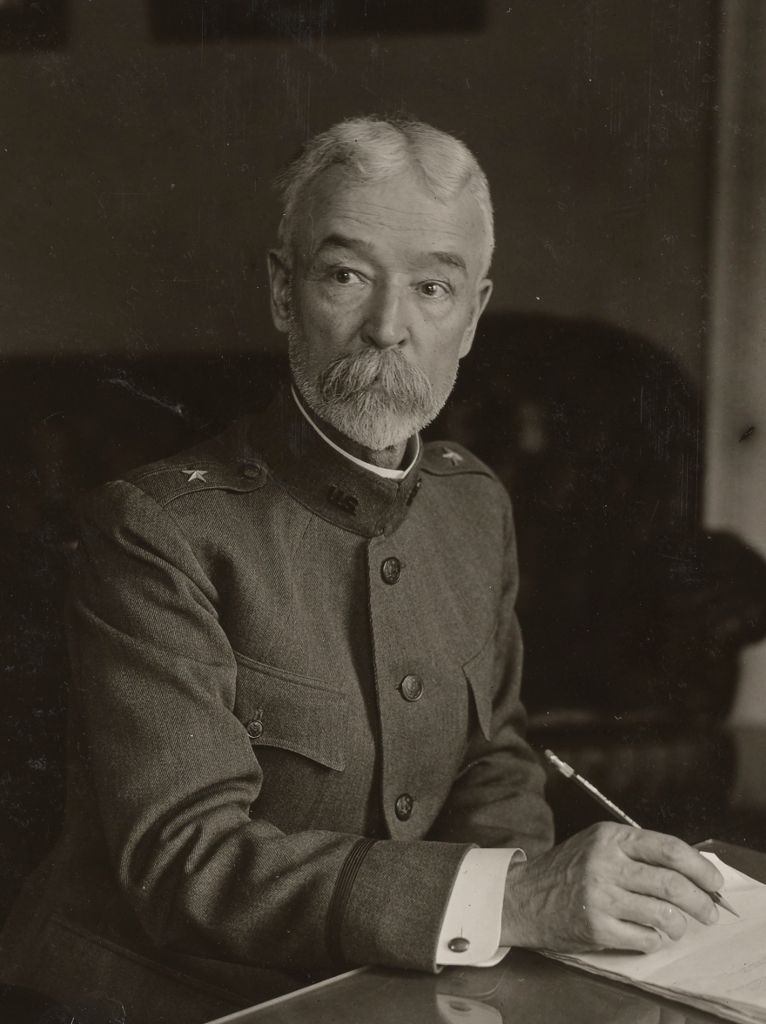
- General John Barrette in March 1918
- Born: May 14, 1862; Lafourche Parish, Louisiana, US
- Died: July 16, 1934 (aged 72); St. Louis, Missouri, US
- Burial place: Arlington National Cemetery
- Military career
- Allegiance: United States
- Branch: United States Army; Field Artillery Branch
- Service years: 1885–1926
- Rank: Brigadier general
- Conflicts: World War I

John Davenport Barette (May 14, 1862 – July 16, 1934) was an American Army officer and later a brigadier general during World War I.

== Early life ==
Barette was born in Thibideauville, La Fourche Parish, Louisiana. He attended Iowa State University for a year and then entered the United States Military Academy. He graduated from the Academy number nine of thirty-nine in the class of 1885.

== Career ==
Upon graduation, Barrette was commissioned a second lieutenant in the Third Artillery Brigade. From 1885 to 1890, he was stationed at the Washington Barracks in the District of Columbia. From 1903 to 1907, Barrette instructed at the Artillery School, and from 1907 to 1909 he was director of the department of artillery and gun defense at the Artillery School at Fort Monroe, Virginia. He commanded Fort McKinney in 1910 and in 1911 commanded the artillery district at Charleston, South Carolina.

He was also lieutenant colonel of the First Provisional Coast Artillery Regiment and Coast Defense Officer of the Eastern Department. In 1912, Barrette commanded the coast defenses of Baltimore, and from 1913 to 1914 he commanded coast defenses for Long Island Sound. He was the Adjutant General of the Western Department in 1915. In 1916, he went to the Philippine Department, where on August 5, 1917, he became a brigadier general of the National Army.

From December 1917 to May 1918, Barrette was acting Chief of Coast Artillery. He commanded the Artillery School in Saumur from June to November 1918. After World War I, Barrette commanded various Coast Artillery districts. His last assignment was as commanding general of the First Corps Area, headquartered in Boston, Massachusetts.

Barrette retired from duty in 1926.

== Death and legacy ==
Barrette died at the age of 72 on July 16, 1934. Fort Barrette and Fort Barrette Road in western Oahu are named in his honor.

== Bibliography ==
- Davis, Henry Blaine Jr. Generals in Khaki. Raleigh, NC: Pentland Press, 1998. ISBN 1571970886 OCLC 231779136
- Marquis Who's Who, Inc. Who Was Who in American History, the Military. Chicago: Marquis Who's Who, 1975. ISBN 0837932017 OCLC 657162692
