= Palaʻau State Park =

State park in Hawaii, United States

Coordinates: 21°10′28″N 157°00′29″W

Palaʻau State Park, the sole state park on the Hawaiian island of Molokai, offers a panoramic view of the Kalaupapa settlement and its historical leper colony. The park amenities include campsites, a picnic shelter, and a hiking trail leading to a distinctive phallic rock formation.
