= Fort Barrette Road =

State highway in Hawaii, United States

- State Route 901
- South end: Naval Air Station Barbers Point
- North end: H-1

Located in Kapolei, Hawaii, the island of Oahu. Ft. Barrette road was constructed as an access road for the Marine Corps air station Barbers Point, later to be converted to Naval Air Station Barbers Point. The first half of the road circles Pu'uokapolei, an ancient extinct cinder cone. The northern terminus of Ft. Barrette road intersects Farrington Highway and turns into Makakilo drive, a city and county of Honolulu roadway.

== Fort Barrette ==
Fort Barrette Road is named after Fort Barrette. The nearby fort is named in honor of John Davenport Barrette, who was a brigadier general in the coastal defenses of the United States Army during World War I. The fort was constructed during the early 1930s. On nearby Pu'u Makakilo were Fire-control stations "A'" (pre-WWII, one structure) and "Makakilo" (World War II) which were part of Fort Barrette From January 1961 to March 1970, the 298th Air Defense Artillery Group, HI ARNG, used Fort Barrette as a support base for the nearby Nike Hercules missile battery (double site, 24 missiles) at Pālehua (OA-63) on Makakilo. The 2nd Battalion manned these sites, known as batteries A and D. Target tracking was by the Integrated Fire Control (IFC) radars located above Pālehua. Oahu was the first place in the United States to receive the solid fuel Nike Hercules. Fort Barrette Road connects Fort Barrette and Makakilo.

Browse numbered routes
← Route 830	→ Route 930
