= Kēōkea, Hawaiʻi County, Hawaii =

Unincorporated community in Hawaii, U.S.

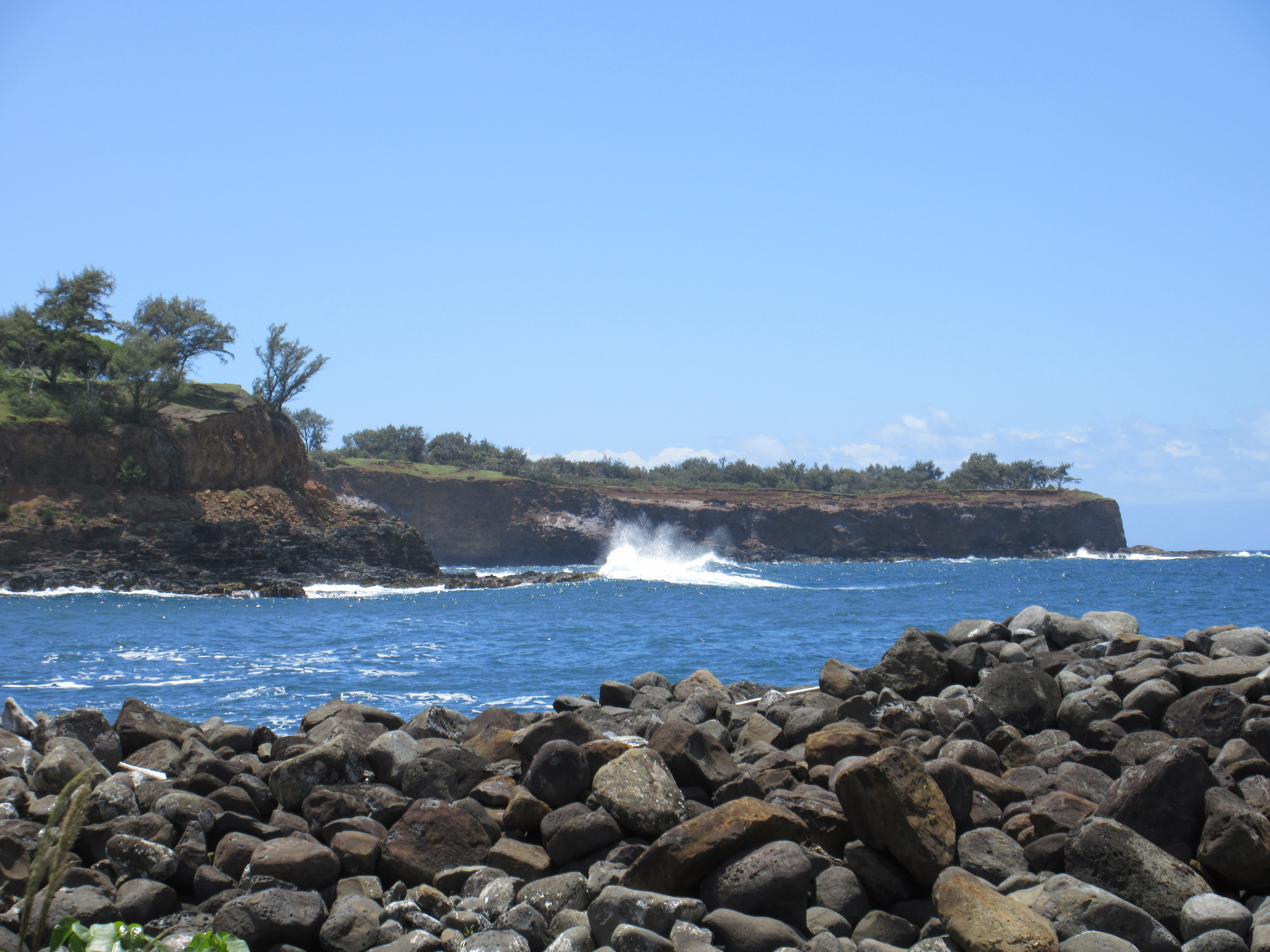
Keokea Beach Park.

Kēōkea is an unincorporated populated place in Hawaiʻi County, Hawaii, United States. It is located at 19°25′10″N 155°52′58″W, near the junction of Māmalahoa Highway (Route 11) and Keala o Keawe Road (Route 160), elevation 960 feet (290 m). Just to the north is the area of Hōnaunau. It was the name for the land division (ahupuaʻa) of ancient Hawaiʻi that stretched from the shoreline to Mauna Loa, owned by Mataio Kekūanaōʻa.

The name is used for several places throughout the Hawaiian Islands. A county park named Kēōkea is on the north coast of the Hawaiʻi Island, at 20°13′37″N 155°44′44″W. In the Hawaiian Language, kē ō kea means "the sound of whitecaps", or "the white sand".
