= Hawaii Route 56 =

State highway on Kauaʻi, Hawaii, US

Hawaii Route 56
- Kūhiō Highway
- Route 56 highlighted in red

Route information
- Maintained by HDOT
- Length: 28.2 mi (45.4 km)
- Existed: 1955–present

Major junctions
- South end: Route 50 in Lihue
- North end: Route 560 in Princeville

Location
- Country: United States
- State: Hawaii
- Counties: Kauaʻi

Highway system
- Routes in Hawaii
← Route 51	→ Route 58

Route 56, also known as Kūhiō Highway, is the main highway on the north and east shore of Kauaʻi island in Kauaʻi County, Hawaii, United States.

== Route description ==
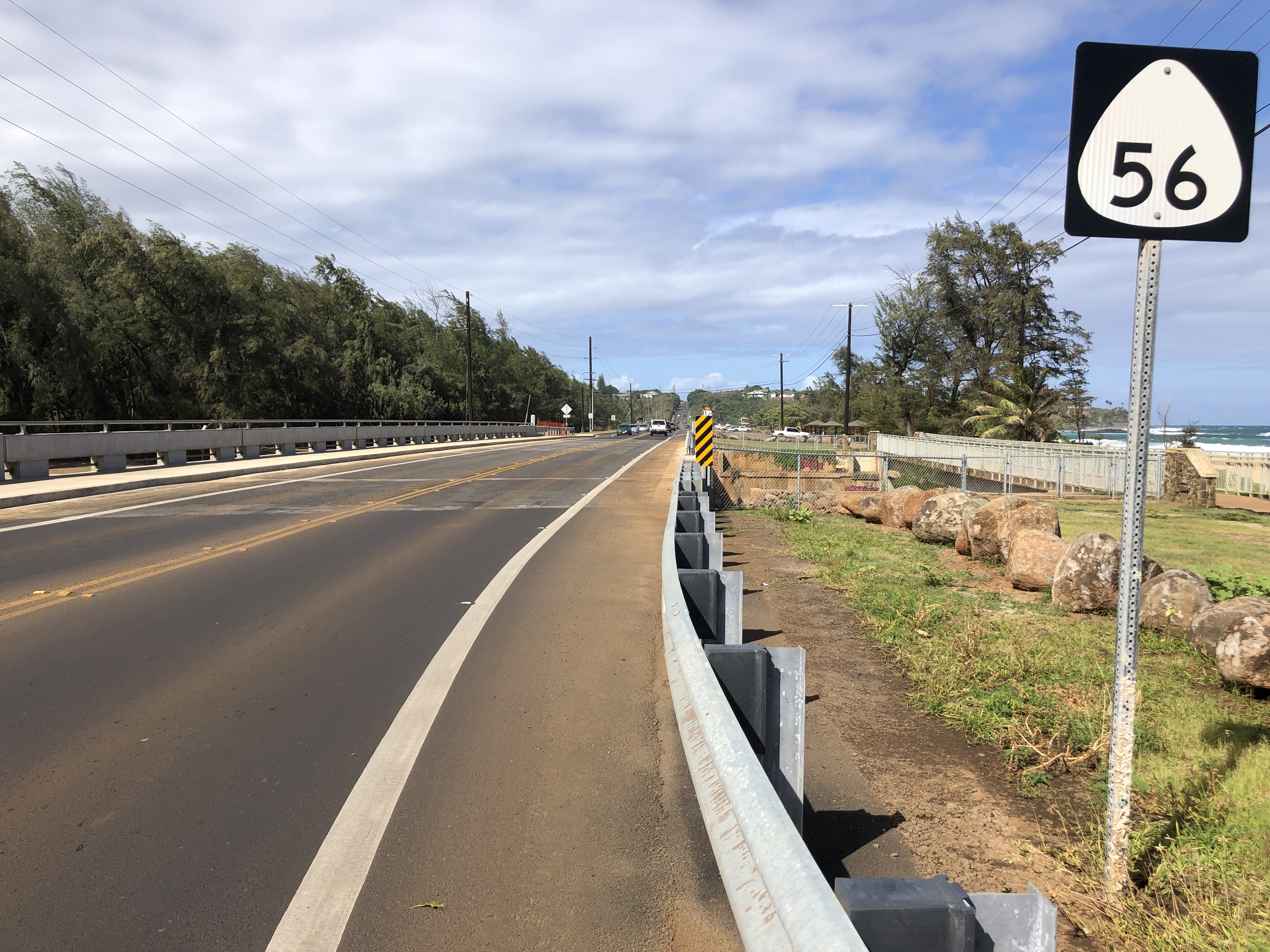
Route 56 northbound just north of Kapaʻa

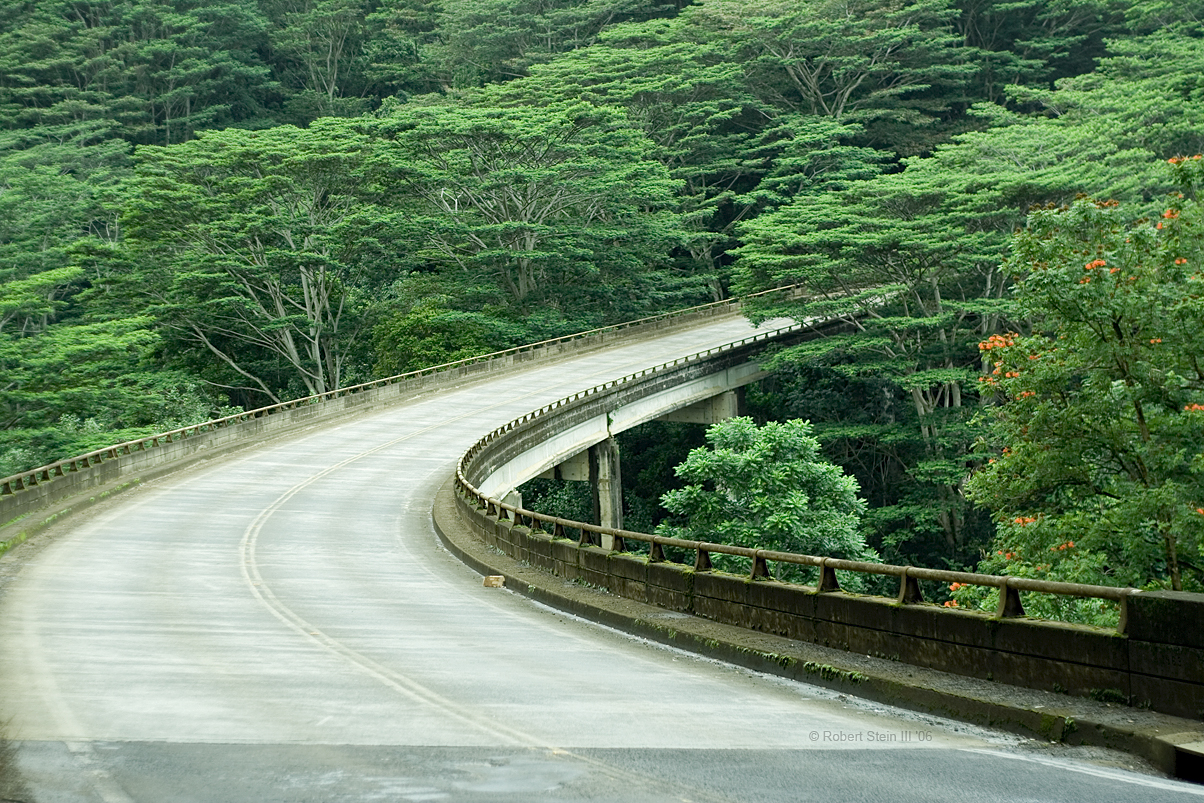
Kalihiwai bridge on Route 56, October 2006

Route 56 runs 28 miles (45 km), stretching from Hawaii Route 50 at the junction of Rice Street in Lihue to the junction of Hawaii Route 560 in Princeville on the island of Kauaʻi. The road is named for Prince Jonah Kūhiō Kalaniana'ole, a territorial delegate to Congress after the U.S. annexed Hawaii.

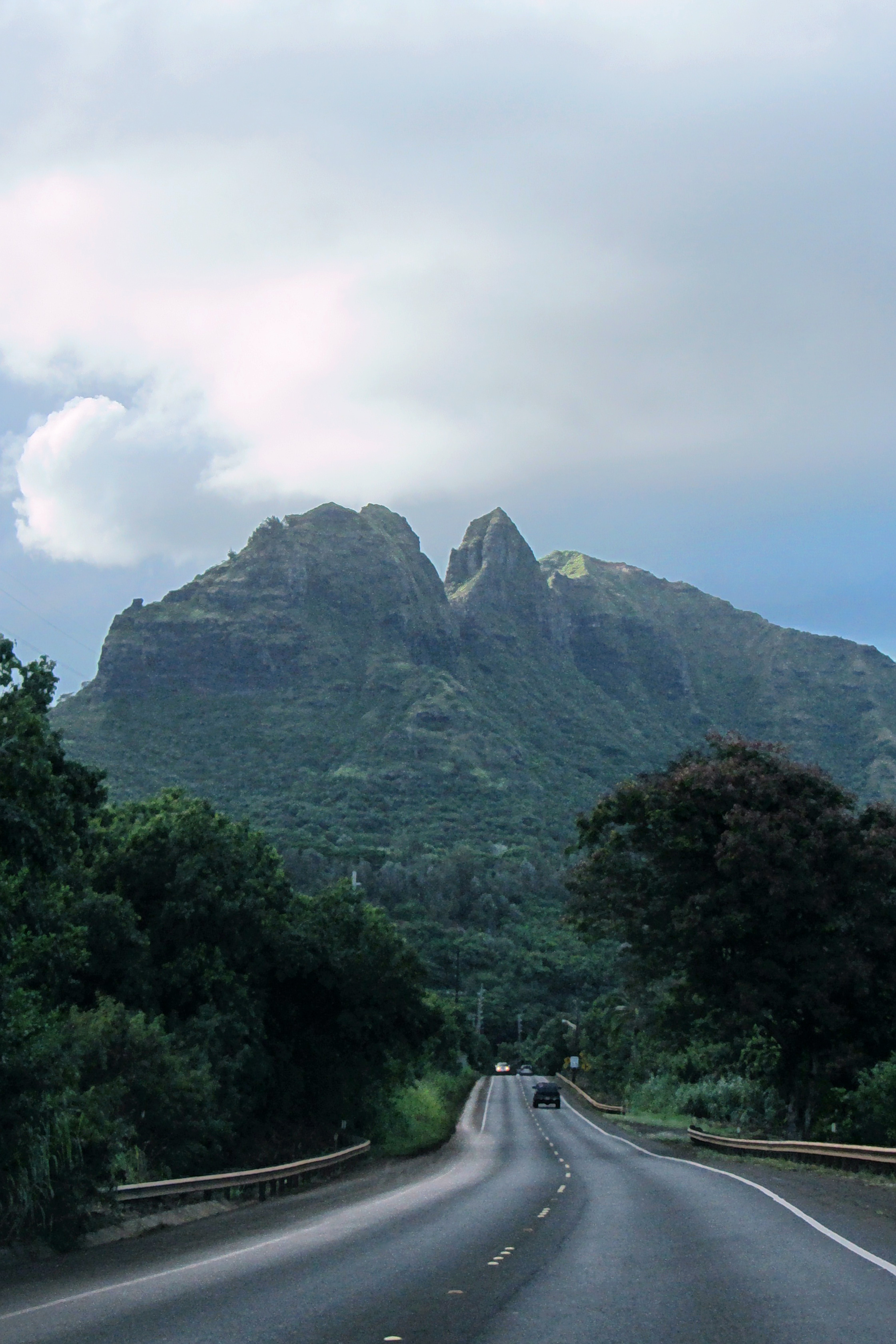
Kalalea (King Kong) Mountain from Route 56

The road is a major thoroughfare for eastern and northern Kauaʻi. Leaving Lihue, the road passes the only Walmart and the major hospital on the island. It connects with Hawaii Route 51 to Lihue Airport. Following the intersection the road briefly passes through some rural patches with the occasional resort before crossing the Wailua River. At the Wailua River, there is a two-lane southbound bridge and a two-lane northbound bridge. A bridge expansion was completed in 2011. Going through Wailua and Kapaʻa, Hawaii 56 is jammed in the morning and the afternoon. Contra flow alleviates rush-hour traffic in the morning between Kapaʻa and Lihue Airport. The southbound lane gets two lanes in the morning to alleviate traffic pressures. Contra flow traffic starts at 6 a.m. on weekdays and 8 a.m. Saturday. Traffic is switched back to normal starting from the north at 11 a.m. weekdays and 1:30 pm on Saturday. The traffic pressure dissipates going through some of the countryside with few services and buildings from Kapaa heading toward Princeville. The bridge over the Kalihiwai river west of Kilauea is particularly scenic.

== Major intersections ==
The entire route is in Kauaʻi County.

Location	mi	km	Destinations	Notes
Līhuʻe	0.0	0.0	Route 50 west	Southern terminus of Route 56; eastern terminus of Route 50
Līhuʻe			Route 51 south	Northern terminus of Route 51
Wailua			Route 580 west	Eastern terminus of Route 580
Hanalei			Route 560 west	Western terminus of Route 56; eastern terminus of Route 560
1.000 mi = 1.609 km; 1.000 km = 0.621 mi

== See also ==
- List of state highways in Hawaii
- List of highways numbered 56
