= Skyline (Honolulu) =

Rapid transit system on Oʻahu, Hawaiʻi

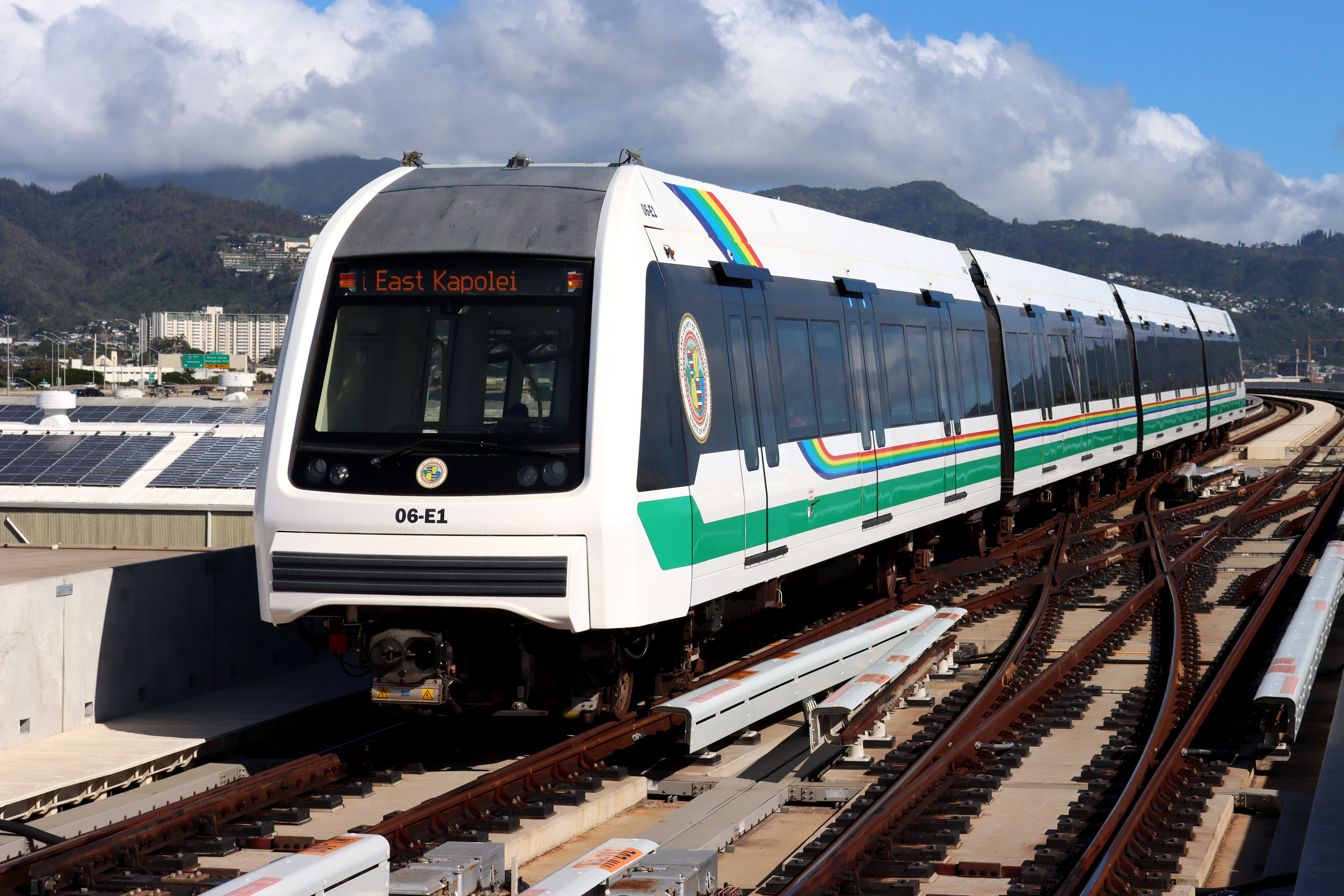
- A Skyline train arriving at Āhua (Lagoon Drive) station

Overview
- Owner: Honolulu Department of Transportation Services
- Locale: City and County of Honolulu
- Termini: West: Kualakaʻi (East Kapolei); East: Kahauiki (Middle Street–Kalihi TC)
- Stations: 13 in service (6 under construction, 2 planned)
- Website: www.honolulu.gov/dts/skyline/ honolulutransit.org

Service
- Type: Light metro
- Operator: Hitachi Rail
- Rolling stock: Hitachi Rail Italy Driverless Metro
- Daily ridership: 11,600 (weekdays, Q2 2026)
- Ridership: 1,696,800 (2025)

History
- Opened: June 30, 2023; 3 years ago

Technical
- Line length: 16.1 mi (25.9 km)
- Num of tracks: 2
- Character: Mostly elevated (except Hālaulani, which is at-grade)
- Track gauge: 4 ft 8 1/2 in (1,435 mm) standard gauge
- Electrification: Third rail, 750 V DC
- Operating speed: 55 mph (89 km/h)
Route map
Skyline highlighted in blue

Skyline is a light metro rapid transit system in the City and County of Honolulu on the island of Oʻahu, in the state of Hawaiʻi. Segment 1 of the project, which lies entirely outside of the Urban Honolulu census-designated place, opened on June 30, 2023 linking East Kapolei (on the ʻEwa Plain) and Aloha Stadium in Hālawa. Segment 2, connecting to Pearl Harbor, Daniel K. Inouye International Airport and Middle Street, opened on October 16, 2025. Segment 3, continuing the line across Urban Honolulu to Downtown, is due to open in 2031. The construction of Skyline constitutes the largest public works project in Hawaiʻi's history.

The 18.9-mile (30.4 km), automated fixed-guideway line was planned, designed, and constructed by the Honolulu Authority for Rapid Transportation (HART), a semi-autonomous government agency. Hitachi Rail, who also built the railcars used on the line, operates Skyline for the Honolulu Department of Transportation Services (which also manages the island's TheBus service). The almost entirely elevated line is the first large-scale, publicly run metro in the United States to feature platform screen doors and driverless trains. In 2025, the line had an annual ridership of 1,696,800, or about 11,600 per day as of the second quarter of 2026, compared to the 25,000 per day that was predicted in 2023.

== History ==
Plans for a mass transit line to connect Honolulu's urban center with outlying areas began in the 1960s, but funding was not approved until 2005. Debate over the development of a rail system in Honolulu has been a major point of contention in local politics, especially leading into the 2008, 2012, and 2016 mayoral elections. Controversy over the rail line was the dominant issue for local politics in the late 2000s, and culminated in a city charter amendment which left the final decision to a direct vote of the residents of Oʻahu. Construction of the rail line was approved by 53% of voters in November 2008, and ground broke on project construction on February 22, 2011.

=== Previous projects ===
For more than 50 years, some Honolulu politicians have attempted to construct a rail transit line. In 1966, then-mayor Neal S. Blaisdell suggested a rail line as a solution to alleviate traffic problems in Honolulu, stating, "Taken in the mass, the automobile is a noxious mechanism whose destiny in workaday urban use is to frustrate man and make dead certain that he approaches his daily occupation unhappy and inefficient."

Frank Fasi was elected to office in 1968, and started planning studies for a rail project, named Honolulu Area Rapid Transit (HART), in 1977. After Fasi lost the 1980 reelection to Eileen Anderson, President Ronald Reagan cut off funding for all upcoming mass transit projects, which led Anderson to cancel HART in 1981. Fasi defeated Anderson in their 1984 rematch and restarted the HART project in 1986, but this second effort was stopped in a 1992 vote by the Honolulu City Council against the necessary tax increase.

Fasi resigned in 1994 to run for governor, with Jeremy Harris winning the special election to replace him. Harris unsuccessfully pursued a bus rapid transit project as an interim solution until he left office in 2004. His successor, Mufi Hannemann, began the Honolulu High-Capacity Transit Corridor Project (HHCTCP), the island's fourth attempt to build a mass transit system operating in a dedicated right-of-way.

Hannemann thought it was "prudent to move quickly" to show the FTA that Honolulu was committed to the HHCTCP. An environmental impact study had not been completed at the time of signing the first construction contract with Kiewit. The FTA needed a complete environmental impact statement before moving Honolulu forward in the grant-awarding process. Hannemann's urge to move fast in the project ultimately allowed stakeholders to delay some important foundational work such as the environmental impact study.

=== Studies ===
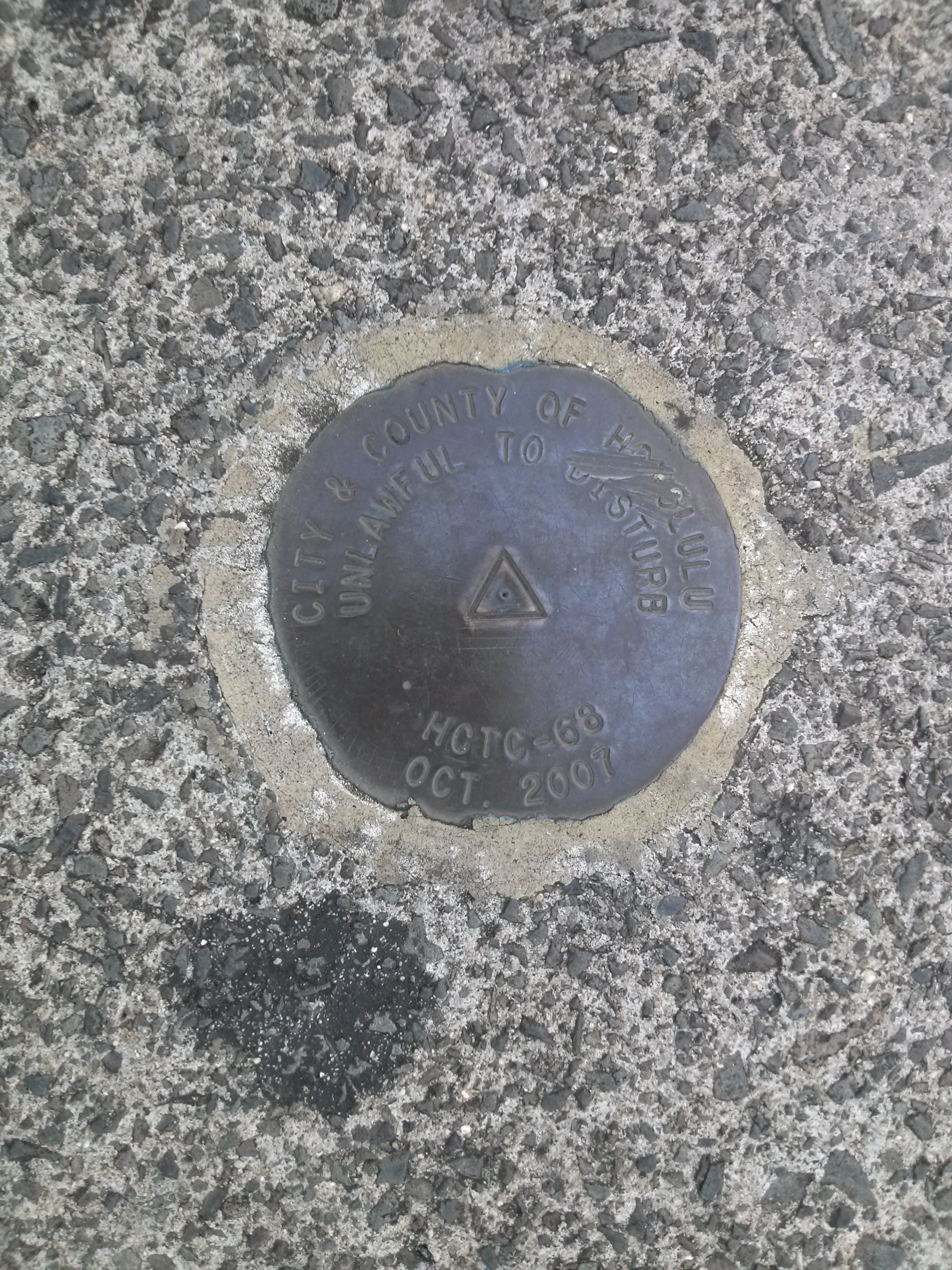
Honolulu High-Capacity Transit Corridor survey marker in the sidewalk at the corner of Kapʻiolani Boulevard and Keʻeaumoku Street in Honolulu

The City and County of Honolulu Department of Transportation Services released the first formal study related to the HHCTCP on November 1, 2006, the Alternatives Analysis Report. The report compared the cost and benefits of a "fixed guideway system", along with three alternatives. The first expanded the existing bus system to match population growth. A second option called for a further expansion to the bus system, with improvements to existing roads. The third alternative proposed a two-lane flyover above the H-1 freeway between Pearl City and Honolulu International Airport, continuing over Nimitz Highway, and into downtown Honolulu. The report recommended construction of the fixed guideway, and is considered the city's official justification for building a rail line.

A second planning document, the Draft Environmental Impact Statement (DEIS), studied possible natural and social impacts of the construction and operation of the HHCTCP. The DEIS was completed and cleared for public release by the Federal Transit Administration (FTA) on October 29, 2008. After minor changes were made to comply with state law, the document was distributed via the city's official project website four days later. The DEIS indicated that impacts of the rail project would include land acquisition from private owners on the route, displacement of residents and businesses, aesthetic concerns related to the elevated guideway, and noise from passing trains.

The city was criticized for timing the release only two days before the 2008 general election. City Councilmember Ann Kobayashi, running as a mayoral candidate against incumbent Hannemann, suggested that the city deliberately withheld key information to early voters who had already cast their ballots for the mayoral candidates, and a city charter amendment related to the project. The anti-rail advocacy group Stop Rail Now criticized the report for not further discussing bus rapid transit and toll lanes, options studied earlier by the city in its Alternatives Analysis.

The third and final official planning document, the Final Environmental Impact Statement (FEIS), was approved and cleared for public release by the FTA on June 14, 2010. The FEIS addresses and incorporates public comments received regarding the DEIS. The FTA subsequently declared the environmental review process complete in a record of decision issued on January 18, 2011.

=== Native burials ===
Like most major infrastructure work in Hawaiʻi, construction of the rail line was likely to uncover historic human remains, notably in its downtown Honolulu section. The Oʻahu Island Burial Council (part of the State Historic Preservation Division, within the State of Hawaiʻi Department of Land and Natural Resources) refused to sign a programmatic agreement on October 21, 2009, over concerns about likely burial sites located along the line's proposed route over Halekauwila Street in Kakaʻako. Three construction projects in the area since 2002 have each encountered unforeseen human remains that led to delays, and archaeologist Thomas Dye stated, "The council is absolutely right that you should expect to find burials on Halekauwila Street".

The Burial Council's core contention was the city's decision to conduct an archaeological survey of the rail line's route in phases, meaning construction on a majority of the line will be complete by the time the survey in the Kakaʻako area is performed, which in turn would increase the likelihood that any remains discovered would be moved instead of being allowed to remain in situ. In response to the Burial Council's concerns, the city agreed to begin conducting an archaeological survey of the area in 2010, two years earlier than originally planned. The state Department of Land and Natural Resources later signed the city's programmatic agreement on January 15, 2011, over the continuing concerns of the Burial Council.

The city's decision to conduct the archaeological survey in phases subsequently led to a lawsuit filed on February 1, 2011, by the Native Hawaiian Legal Corporation on behalf of cultural practitioner Paulette Kaleikini. The suit, which named both the city and the State of Hawaiʻi as defendants, contended that state law required the full length of the rail line to have an archaeological survey conducted before any construction took place, and sought to void the environmental impact statement and all construction permits issued for the project. Kaleikini's lawyers filed on February 18 a request for an injunction to stop work on the project until the case was resolved. The suit was initially dismissed in March 2011 by Circuit Court Judge Gary Chang. However, after Kaleikini's lawyers appealed, the Hawaiʻi Supreme Court ruled in August 2012 in the plaintiff's favor, finding that the State Historic Preservation Division did not comply with state law when it approved the project. The case was then remanded to Circuit Court. In December 2012, the United States District Court for the District of Hawaii granted the plaintiffs' injunction, and ordered that all construction-related activities be halted until compliance with the Hawaiʻi Supreme Court decision was met. Judge Tashima, the sitting judge on the case, ruled that the city is required to file periodic status updates on their compliance with the judgment. The injunction would then terminate 30 days after defendants filed a notice of final compliance.

In February 2013, the rail authority said that they had completed the required archaeological surveys and that construction would resume later that year. The agency reported that remains were discovered at seven sites in the downtown area, and that if it was decided to leave them in place, then they "would be able to adjust the final design to accommodate that request".

=== Impact on Honolulu mayoral elections ===
The importance of the Honolulu High-Capacity Transit Corridor Project in the 2008 mayoral election led one observer to describe the vote as a "referendum on rail transit". Two challengers emerged as rivals to incumbent Mufi Hannemann: City Councilmember Ann Kobayashi and University of Hawaiʻi professor Panos Prevedouros. Kobayashi supported a rubber-tired mass transit system as opposed to the conventional system chosen by the Hannemann administration. Prevedouros, on the other hand, as a noted highway advocate, opposed any type of mass transit project and instead favored construction of a reversible tollway over the H-1 freeway (similar to the Managed Lane option, which the Alternatives Analysis studied and rejected as unworkable, instead reworking existing road systems to ease congestion). No candidate won a majority of votes in the September 20 primary, forcing a runoff between Hannemann and Kobayashi; Hannemann successfully retained his post with 58% of the vote in the November 4 general election.

On April 22, 2008, the Stop Rail Now advocacy group announced their intent to file a petition with the city to place a question on the 2008 ballot to create an ordinance that read: "Honolulu mass transit shall not include trains or rail". Stop Rail Now attempted to submit the petition with 49,041 signatures on August 5, but was initially denied after the city clerk claimed the city charter did not allow the petition to be submitted less than 180 days before a general election, as the wording of the petition called for a special election. The group filed a lawsuit to force the city to accept the petition, and the courts ruled in Stop Rail Now's favor on August 14. Stop Rail Now's effort ultimately failed on September 4 when the city clerk deemed only 35,056 of the signatures valid, well short of the 44,525 required.

In response to the possibility that Stop Rail Now's petition would fail, the City Council had however voted on August 21 to place a proposed amendment to the city charter on the ballot, asking voters to decide the fate of the project. Mayor Hannemann signed the proposal the following day. The City Council's proposed amendment was not intended to have a direct legal effect on the city's ability to continue the project, but was meant as a means for Oahu residents to express their opinions on its construction. The charter amendment was approved with 53% of votes cast in favor of rail and 47% against. Majorities of voters in Leeward and Central Oahu, the areas that will be served by the project, voted in favor of the amendment, while the majority of those living outside the project's scope in Windward Oahu and East Honolulu voted against it. In mid-2010, Hannemann resigned as mayor to run for governor and Kirk Caldwell assumed the position of interim mayor.

In the 2016 Honolulu mayoral election, the main three candidates again took opposing views on rail. Honolulu City Council Member Charles Djou, former mayor Peter Carlisle, and incumbent Kirk Caldwell all ran with the stated goal of finishing the project. However, Republican candidate Djou ran on a platform of drastically cutting spending on rail by cutting funding on buying cars on the rail before its completion and hiring mainland consultants. Caldwell also stated that spending on rail should be cut, but instead believed that the line should be shortened to end at Middle Street. Carlisle was the only candidate in support of funding the full rail system, staying that rail has progressed too far to be stopped midway. While Caldwell won the election, he quickly adopted Carlisle's position that the project should be seen through to completion.

=== Delays and cost overruns ===
Logo of the Honolulu Authority for Rapid Transportation (HART), the semi-autonomous government agency which built the line

Construction on the rail line was originally scheduled to begin in December 2009 but did not occur due to delays in the project review process and in obtaining federal approval of the environmental impact statement.

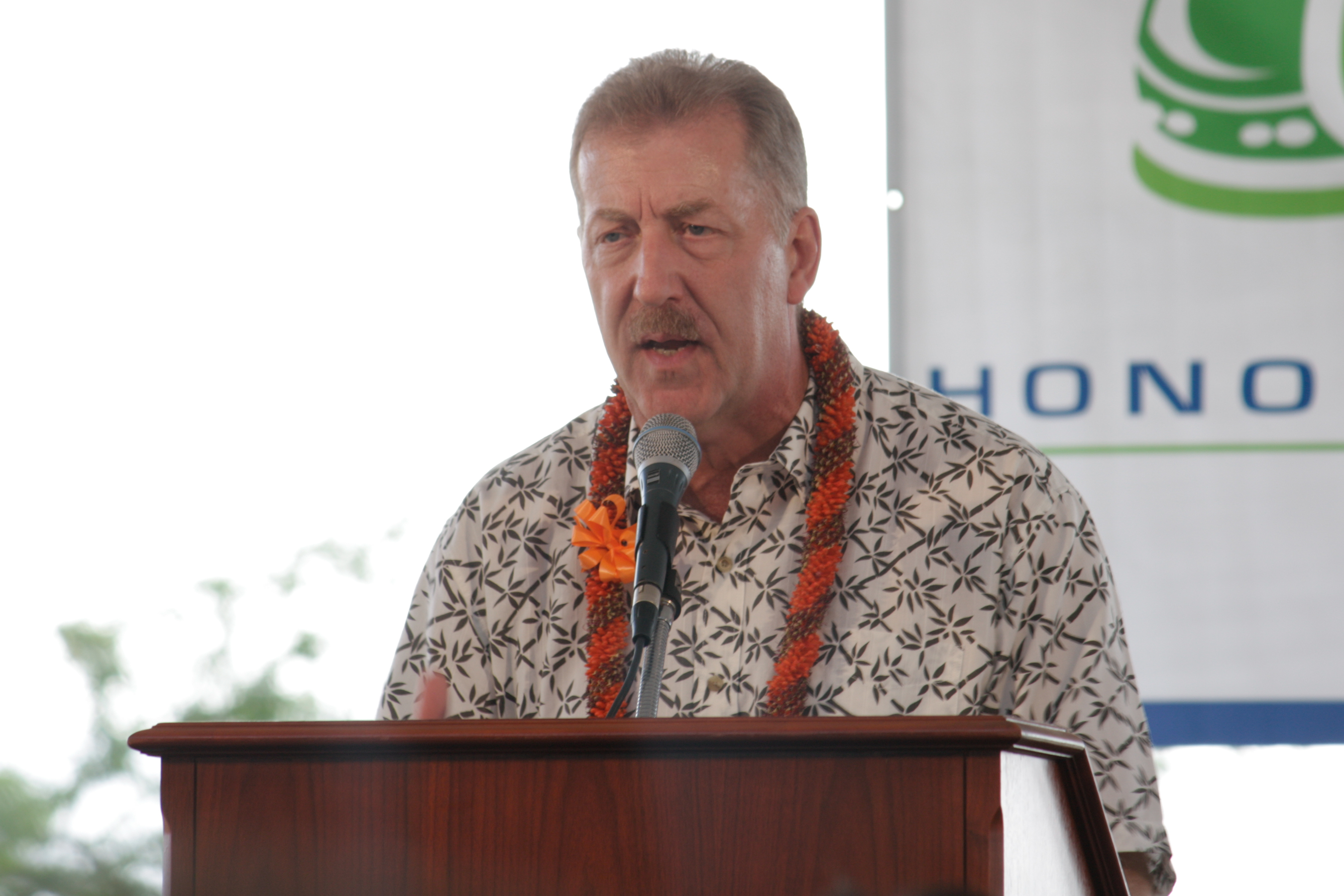
Former Honolulu mayor Peter Carlisle speaking at the project's groundbreaking ceremony

In January 2010, Republican Governor Linda Lingle publicly recommended that the city alter plans for the rail line after news reports on FTA documents revealed that the agency raised issues over declining tax revenues in connection with a global economic recession, and commissioned a study by the state to review the project's finances in March. The state financial study, publicly released on December 2, 2010, indicated that the project would likely experience a $1.7 billion overrun above the $5.3 billion projected cost, and that collections from the state's General Excise Tax would be 30% below forecasts. The study was dismissed as "damaged goods" and "a pre-determined anti-rail rant" by Democratic mayor Peter Carlisle. He also pointed out that several conclusions were "erroneous" and "inaccurate", before concluding that "spending a third of a million dollars for this shoddy, biased analysis is an appalling waste of our tax dollars." Lingle's Democratic successor, Neil Abercrombie, publicly stated that the financial analysis would not affect his decision to approve or disapprove of the project, saying that the state's responsibility is limited to the environmental review process, and that decisions regarding the project's finances belong to the city and the FTA. Governor Abercrombie subsequently approved the project's final environmental impact statement on December 16, 2010. The Honolulu City Council held a hearing on January 12, 2011 about the state's financial review, but the hearing was not attended by any state officials, who had been invited to testify.

On January 18, 2011, the FTA issued a "record of decision", indicating that the project had met the requirements of its environmental review and that the city was allowed to begin construction work on the project. The record of decision allowed the city to begin negotiating with owners of land that will be purchased for the project, to begin relocating utility lines to make way for construction of the line and stations, and to purchase rolling stock for the rail line. A ground-breaking ceremony was held on February 22, 2011, in Kapolei, at the site of the future East Kapolei station along Kualakai Parkway.

The City and County of Honolulu established the Honolulu Authority for Rapid Transportation (HART) on July 1, 2011. HART is a semi-autonomous government agency authorized to develop, operate, maintain, and expand the rail system. HART is led by its own Board of Directors, which appoints an Executive Director/CEO to provide leadership, direction and supervision of the day-to-day business activities of the agency.

In March 2012, Dan Grabauskas was hired on a three-year contract as the first Executive Director/CEO of HART. In 2014 HART CEO Dan Grabauskas blamed lawsuits, launched in 2011, for some of the cost overruns after bids to construct the first nine stations exceeded the budget by $100 million. His claims were disputed by the plaintiffs in one of the cases, who said HART could have put the stations out to tender and that HART had deliberately delayed the legal proceedings so a judgment would only be delivered after a significant proportion of the line had been completed.

In August 2016, Grabauskas resigned as HART director amid criticism of his leadership by the HART board. Michael Formby was appointed interim director.

=== Testing and more delays ===
Interim service over the first ten miles of the line, between East Kapolei and Aloha Stadium, was scheduled to commence in October 2020. However, complications due to the COVID-19 pandemic pushed the start date back by three months. By November 2020, the opening had again slipped to late 2021 due to delays in testing equipment.

In December 2020, HART discovered early wear on the track crossings, or "frogs". It was later determined that the trains' wheel flanges were approximately one-half inch (13 mm) narrower at the frogs, thus affecting the driverless trains' ability to safely navigate certain track crossings at the speeds needed to operate on schedule. During investigation, subpar welding and sandblasting-induced cracks were also discovered. In November 2021, Roger Morton, director of Honolulu's Department of Transportation Services, stated that a required three months of field testing and certification (to be carried out by Hitachi) was scheduled to begin in January 2022.

In December 2021, it was decided that temporary welding fixes would be made to allow the trains to run at operational speeds despite the narrower wheels, with plans to swap out wheels with wider ones during future maintenance work. An initial call searching for contractors to perform the manganese welding work failed to return any bids. Due to the lack of local companies able to complete the work, the state's Department of Commerce and Consumer Affairs granted HART an exemption allowing mainland contractors to be hired.

=== Social impact ===
Proponents of the system say it will alleviate worsening traffic congestion, already among the worst in the United States. They assert that the long and narrow urban agglomeration in south Oʻahu is ideally suited to rail, and that highway expansion will only lead to induced demand. In opposition, freeway advocate Panos Prevedouros has questioned its cost-effectiveness compared to "road widening or lane addition", and speculated in 2015 that it "will never provide any congestion relief for the traveling public".

== Financing ==
Construction of Skyline is financed by a surcharge on local taxes as well as a $1.55 billion grant from the Federal Transit Administration (FTA). After major cost overruns, the tax surcharges were extended in 2016 by five years to raise another $1.2 billion; however that additional funding was only sufficient for construction out to Middle Street in Kalihi. The FTA stated that its contribution is contingent to completion of the line all the way to Ala Moana Center, and will not be increased. After much wrangling, the state legislature in 2017 approved $2.4 billion in additional taxes to allow the city to complete the project according to the original plan.

The process to award the contract for building the final 4.3-mile (6.9 km) section through downtown Honolulu was suspended in 2015. The process was restarted in September 2017, and the first major contract for that section, estimated at $400 million, was awarded in May 2018.

The final cost has grown from preliminary projections of $4 billion in 2006 to as much as $12.4 billion by 2021. Critics have called for a "forensic audit" to establish the cause of the increase. The tax increase legislation passed in 2017 also requires the State auditor carry out an audit of the project's accounts and to consider alternatives for completing the system. The projected shortfall for the rail project is roughly $3 billion, with the completion date pushed back to 2031.

=== Initial General Excise Tax (GET) surcharge ===
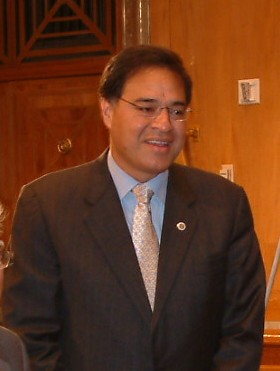
Former Honolulu mayor Mufi Hannemann

After winning the 2004 election, Hannemann announced that construction of a rail line was an administration priority. The following May and upon prompting by the city, the Hawaii State Legislature passed a bill (Act 247) to allow counties a one-half percent increase in the Hawaiʻi General Excise Tax (GET), from 4% to 4.5%, to fund transportation projects. According to the bill, increased revenue would be delivered to counties implementing the raised tax to fund general public transportation infrastructure throughout Hawaiʻi, and to pay for mass transit in the case of the City and County of Honolulu. Money collected from the initial 4% GET would remain state revenue.

Republican governor Linda Lingle initially threatened to veto the bill, believing that money destined for county governments should be collected by the individual counties. After compromising with legislative leaders and Mayor Hannemann, however, she allowed the bill to become law. On July 12, 2005, the bill was enacted as Act 247 of the Session Laws of Hawaiʻi 2005, without the Governor's signature. A month later, the Honolulu City Council authorized the one-half percent GET increase, and Hannemann signed the measure into law on August 24. Act 247 required Honolulu to use the funds only for the construction and operation of a mass transit system, and barred its use for public roads and other existing transit systems, such as TheBus. Since no other county authorized the excise tax increase before the deadline of December 31, 2005, the Hawaiʻi GET remains at 4% for the state's three other counties. The increase went into effect on January 1, 2007, and was due to expire on December 31, 2022.

The Legislature considered a bill in the 2009 legislative session that would have redirected income from the half-percent increase back to the state to offset a $1.8 billion projected shortfall in the following three fiscal years. The bill was opposed by Mayor Hannemann and other city leaders who believed that redirecting the money would jeopardize federal funding for the project, and was eventually dropped after U.S. Senator Daniel Inouye indicated to the Legislature that he shared the city's concerns.

=== GET surcharge extensions and "Hotel Tax" surcharge ===
In January 2016, the Council extended the GET for another five years to add $1.2 billion in funding to cover a budget blowout. The council also required that the money raised by the extension go into a contingency fund and to pay for disability access to the system. HART was required to provide quarterly financial reports to the council.

On September 1, 2017, the Legislature, after meeting for a week in a special session on rail financing, approved further taxes to raise $2.4 billion for the project. The taxes include a further three-year extension to the 0.5 percent General Excise Tax surcharge, which will now expire in 2030, and a thirteen-year, one percent surcharge on the existing 9.25 percent statewide Transient Accommodation Tax (TAT) which is charged to hotel guests. Efforts to pass a funding bill in May 2017 had failed and the impetus for the special session was an FTA deadline of September 15 for a funding plan to cover the shortfall. The bill also grants the state government oversight over the project including the appointment of two non-voting representatives on the HART board and calls for an audit of HART by the state auditor. It was signed into law by the governor on September 5.

=== Federal Transit Administration's request for recovery plan ===
In mid-2016, the FTA requested that HART develop a "recovery plan" by August 7, 2016. Also, in June, a separate report by Jacobs Engineering, the project management contractor, said under a worst-case scenario the final cost would be $10.79 billion.

In January 2017, a group called "Salvage the Rail" published a plan, based on Option 2A from six alternatives proposed by the FTA to HART in 2016, that would terminate the elevated section at Middle Street and run at street level to the terminus along a route one block inland from the HART plan. The system would need to be reconfigured to use new driver-operated low floor vehicles, lowering the platforms on the stations already constructed. Proponents say it would save $3 billion and four years of construction, as well as avoid disturbing burial sites under the downtown area.

After an extension was granted by the FTA, HART submitted its recovery plan in April 2017 which concluded that completion of the original 21 station route was the only viable option. An alternative "Plan B" to build only 14 stations within the already funded $6.5 billion budget, was ruled out because of lower ridership, legal risks, insufficient contingency and other reasons. The new project cost was $8.165 billion with media reports indicating that after financing charges are included it could be over $10 billion. An updated schedule for opening said the section from East Kapolei to Aloha Stadium will open at the end of 2020 and operation of the full route by December 2025.

In September 2017, HART submitted an updated recovery plan to the FTA with a new estimate price of $9.02 billion. The plan still includes $8.165 billion in construction costs, but has reduced financing costs of $858 million following state legislation granting both prolonged and new taxes to fund the project. The State Auditor has been tasked to consider alternatives for completing the system, as part of its audit of HART. As of January 2018 the FTA has not formally accepted the new recovery plan but has asked HART for more details including how it came up with its tax-revenue forecasts.

In February 2019, the FTA served HART with two subpoenas. The first asked the agency to send investigators documents relating to its real estate acquisition program. HART said some of the documents show it overspent on relocating residents and businesses along the rail route, which may have cost up to $4 million. The second sought the minutes from all board of directors meetings from 2011 through 2018, including the board-members’ private discussions in executive sessions.

In September 2019, the FTA accepted the recovery plan.

=== Revised schedule and estimates ===
An estimate released in November 2020 put the total cost of the project's construction and financing at $11 billion, and pushed back its expected completion date to 2033, with delays due to the COVID-19 pandemic and utility relocation work. By March 2021, this had grown to $12.4 billion, with its estimated completion date moved forward to March 2031. In 2025, after shortening the route to end in Kakaʻako rather than in Ala Moana Center, the expected budget was $10.079 billion, though a 2026 report suggested the budget may increase again by $111 million, leading to a final cost of $10.190 billion. Its construction constitutes Hawaiʻi's largest public works project ever.

== Route ==
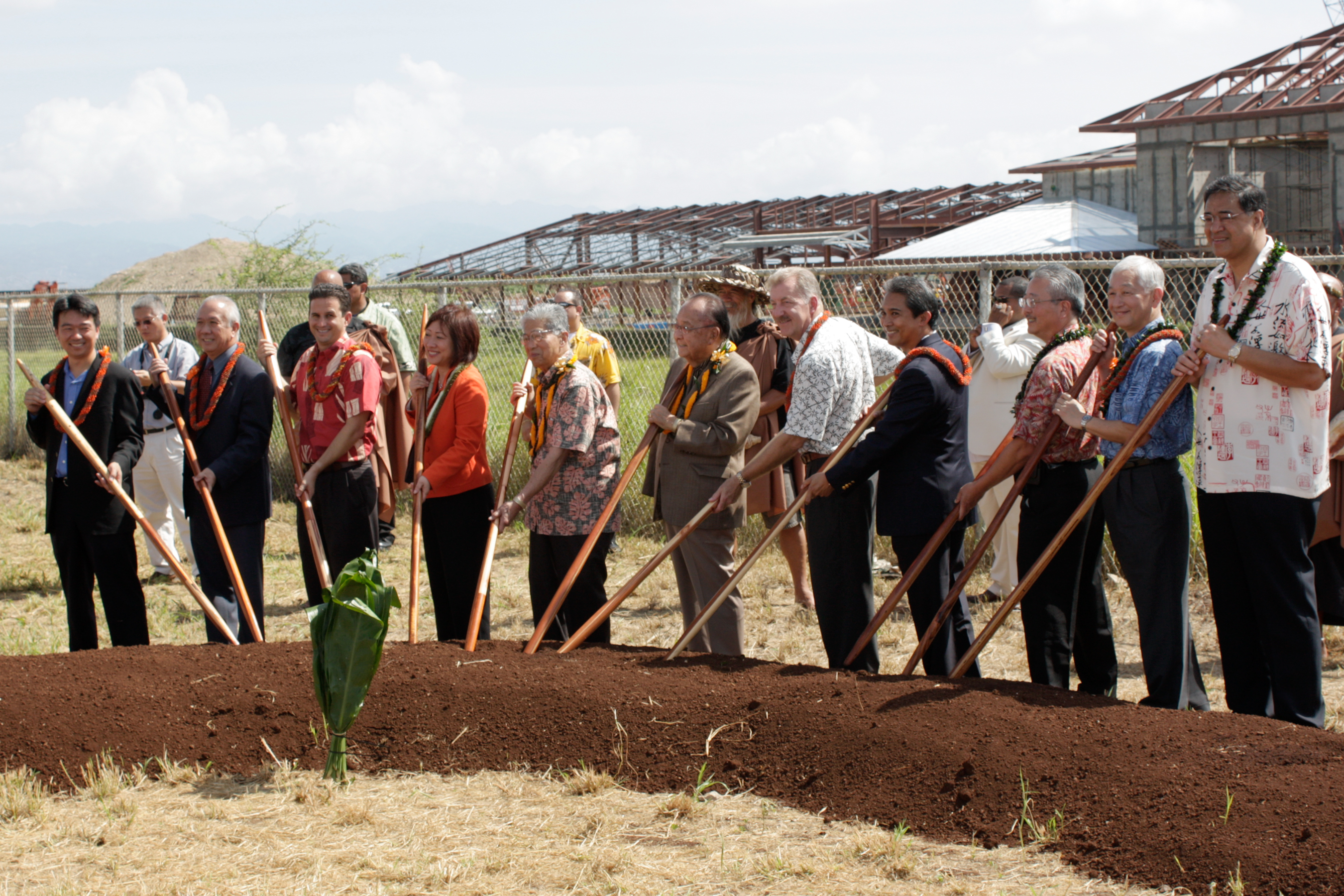
City and state politicians at the project's groundbreaking ceremony

Skyline consists of an almost entirely elevated rapid transit line from the eastern edge of Kapolei, near the University of Hawaiʻi–West Oʻahu campus, to the Hawaiʻi Capital Historic District, with a future expansion planned to the Ala Moana Center (east of Downtown Honolulu). It will have twenty-one stations and run along the southern shore of Oʻahu between Kapolei and Honolulu, passing through Waipahu, Pearl City, Waimalu, ʻAiea, and Hālawa. The only at-grade trackage is a 0.6-mile (0.97 km) section near Leeward Community College, which features no level crossings.

The full project is divided into four segments with overlapping construction periods and expected revenue service dates:

1. In 2016, the western portion of the line comprising Segment 1 (Kualakaʻi to Hālawa) was scheduled to open in late 2020, and the remaining segments (Hālawa to Kālia) in late 2025. In March 2021, this second date was pushed back to 2031. On May 9, 2023, it was announced that Segment 1 would open the following month.
2. On March 18, 2025, it was announced that Segment 2 of service from Hālawa to Kahauiki would open in October 2025. This is ahead of the previously estimated date of 2031, but behind the originally planned date of May 14, 2024.
3. Segment 3 from Kahauiki to Kaʻākaukukui is still expected to open in 2031, with constructing beginning in August 2025.
4. The final two stations between Kaʻākaukukui and Kālia have been indefinitely deferred, although HART says it remains committed to completing them in the future.

Skyline route segments and schedule
Schematic route map for Honolulu Rail Transit
| Segment | Length | Termini | | Opening | Ref. |
| 1 | 10.8 miles (17.4 km) | Kualakaʻi | Hālawa | June 30, 2023 | |
| 2 | 5.3 miles (8.5 km) | Hālawa | Kahauiki | October 16, 2025 | |
| 3 | 3.3 miles (5.3 km) | Kahauiki | Kaʻākaukukui | 2031 (scheduled) | |
| Ala Moana extension | 0.8 miles (1.3 km) | Kaʻākaukukui | Kālia | —N/a | |

== Design ==
=== Segment 1: Farrington/Kamehameha ===
On October 21, 2009, the city announced Kiewit Pacific Co. had won the $483 million contract to build Segment 1 of the line (the 7-mile (11 km) long Farrington and 4-mile (6.4 km) long Kamehameha sections), bidding $90 million under the expected price. The stations were tendered separately.

The construction of the rail line started from suburban areas in Kapolei and Ewa, and progresses east towards the urban center in Honolulu. There are 112 columns from Kualakaʻi station to the ʻEwa area. The choice to start from Kapolei was made because Segment 1 must include a baseyard for trains, which is more cheaply built away from the center, and also because the city chose to delay construction in the urban center to later segments of the project due to associated major impacts to existing infrastructure and unpopular traffic delays.

To speed construction, the elevated trackway is built using precast concrete box girder bridge segments. This method was first used for MARTA in the 1980s. The trackway was designed by FIGG Bridge Engineers (responsible for the box girder segmental bridge) and HNTB (responsible for the columns). It is supported on single piers, each 6 to 7 feet (1.8 to 2.1 m) in diameter at the base and 30 feet (9.1 m) high, flaring at the top to support the lower section of the box girder; the piers are themselves supported by drilled shafts from 7 to 8 feet (2.1 to 2.4 m) in diameter.

Casting of the box girder segments began in 2014 at a rate of 13 segments per day; in total, 5,238 segments will be required for the first 10 mi (16 km) segment. The segments are cast locally in Kalaeloa. Each segment weighs 100,000 pounds (45,000 kg) and measures (L×W×H, with length measured along the direction of the rails) 11 by 30 by 7 feet (3.4 m × 9.1 m × 2.1 m), and the deck ranges in thickness from 8 to 15 inches (200 to 380 mm). Once the piers were erected, a pier bracket ram was placed and a launching gantry was used to bridge the span between adjacent piers; a deck-mounted crane lifted the precast segments onto the gantry, which supported them while they were tensioned together. In total, 430 of the 438 spans in Segment 1 were assembled using precast box girder segments, at an average rate of 1 to 2 days per span.

For the eight long spans required to bridge the H-1/H-2 Waiawa interchange in Pearl City, a balanced cantilever construction method was used instead. This covers the segments from Pier 252 to Pier 256. Instead of precast segments, Kiewit used segments cast in-place, starting from the piers set in the freeway medians and working towards adjacent piers. The yellow-painted traveling forms at each end were used to cast each segment, then moved to the fresh end to cast the next segment. Each segment required 8,000 pounds (3,600 kg) of rebar and 48 cubic yards (37 m^{3}) of concrete, and weighed 210,000 lb (95,000 kg). 73 segments were required. The final pour for the balanced cantilever was performed in September 2016.

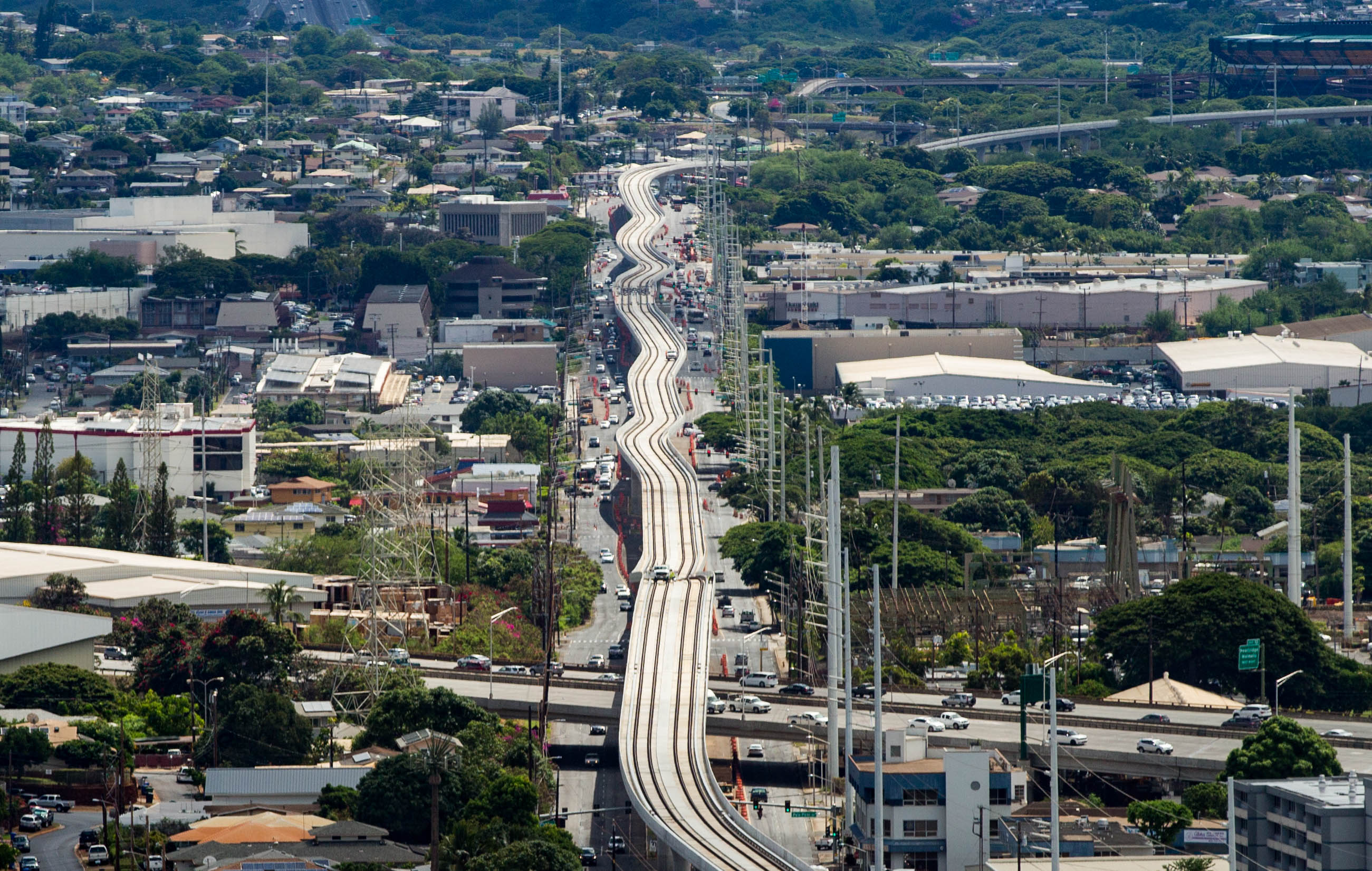
Kamehameha Highway section under construction (2017), viewed east towards Aloha Stadium

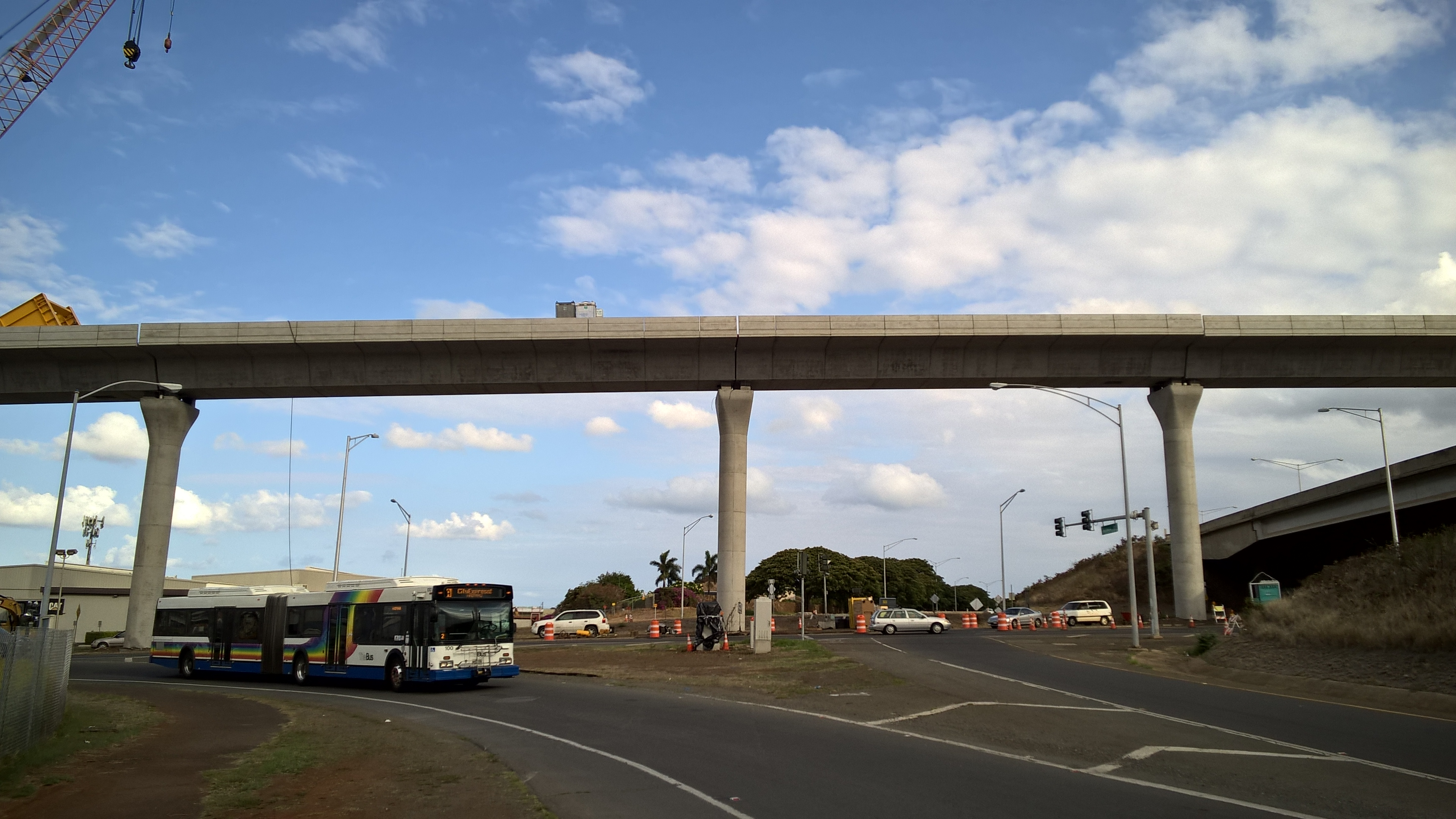
Precast bridge segments supported by cylindrical piers were used to construct most of the guideway (2015)

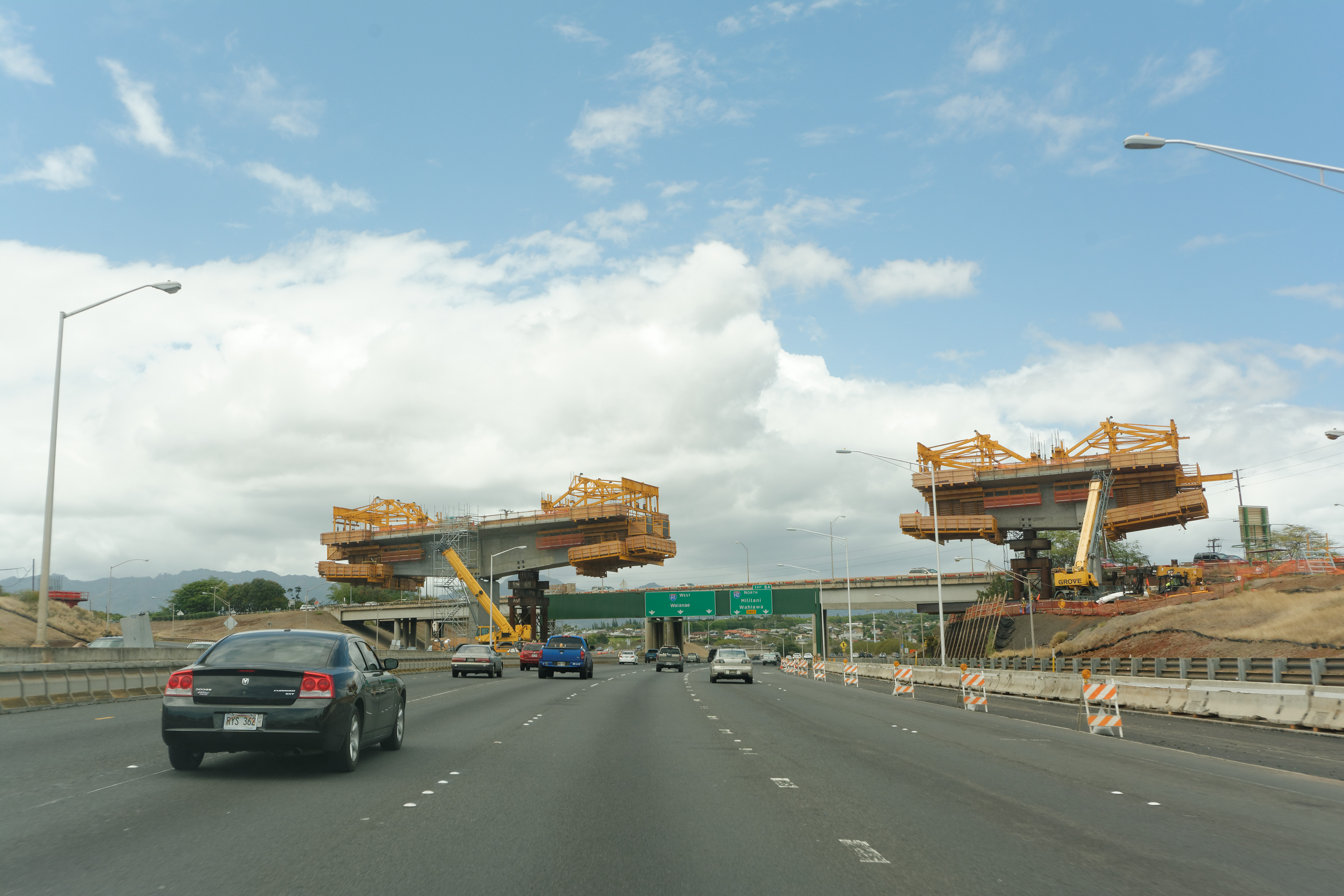
Balanced cantilever construction over Interstate H-1 in 2015

=== Segment 2: Airport ===
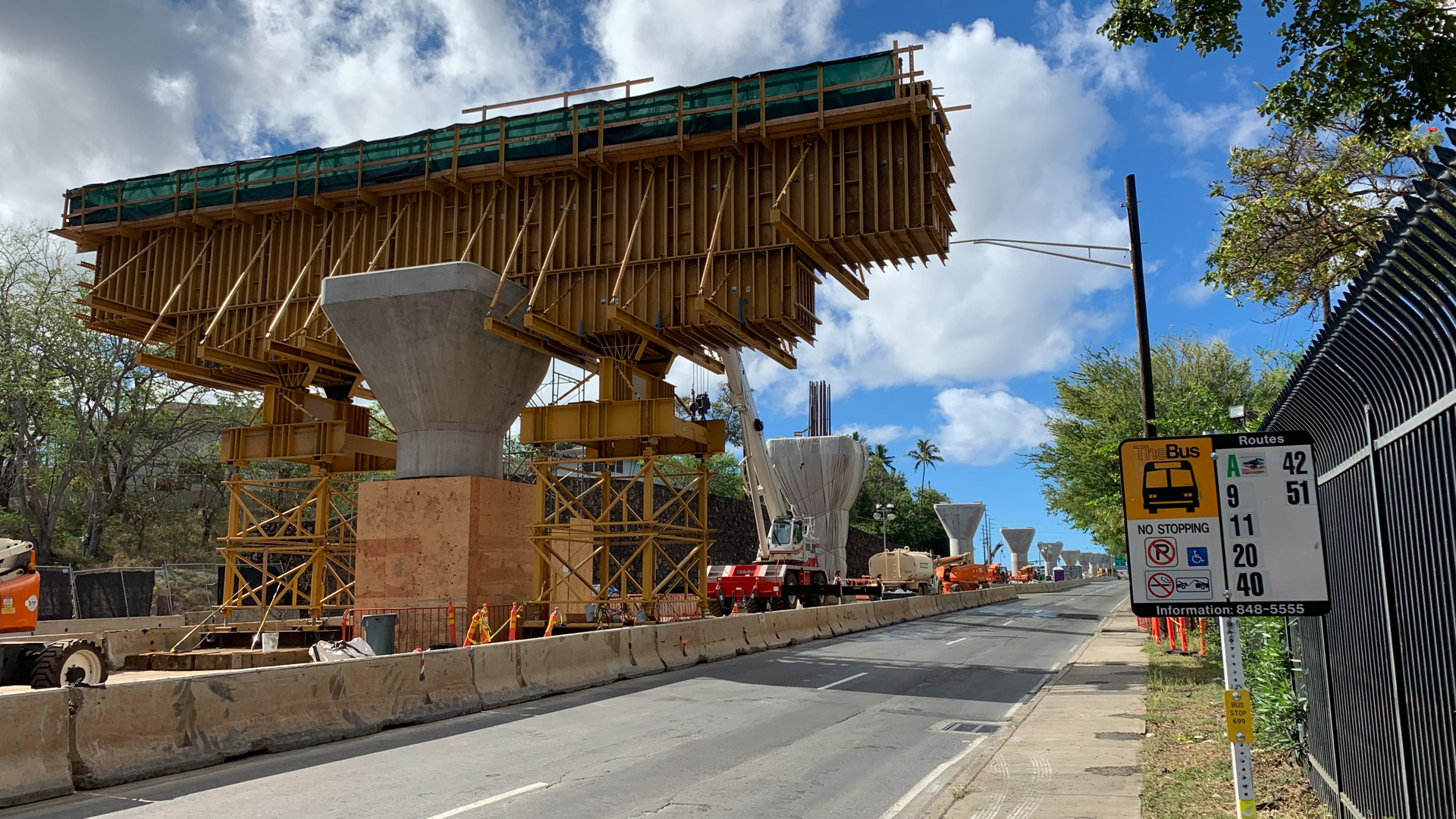
Airport section underway near Joint Base Pearl Harbor–Hickam (2019)

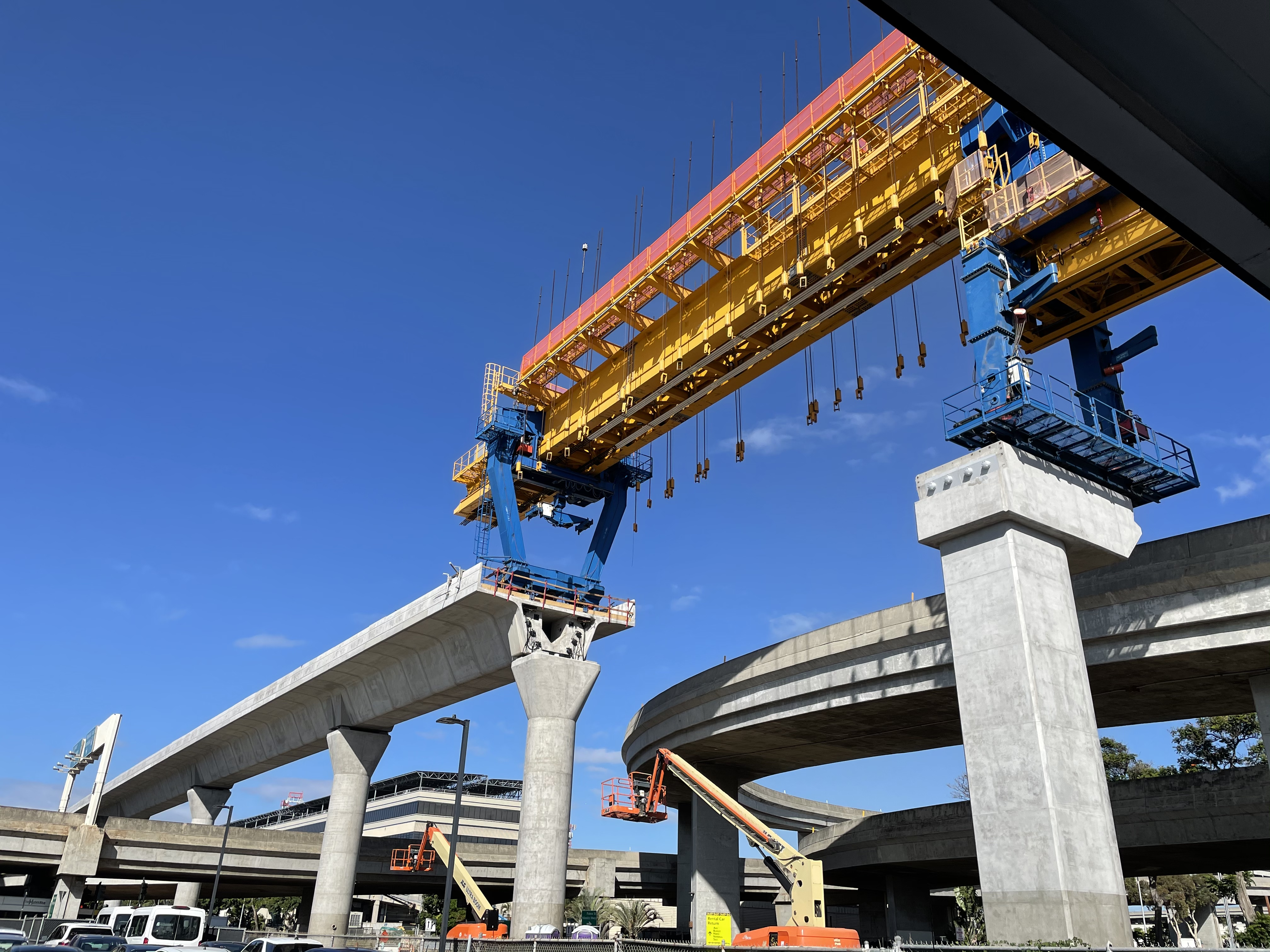
Project construction at Daniel K. Inouye International Airport (2020)

The second segment of the route to be completed was the 5.1 mi (8.2 km) Airport section east from Aloha Stadium to Middle Street (the site of Kalihi Transit Center, an existing major bus transfer point). It includes four stations, including the Honolulu International Airport station. AECOM won the contract to design the Airport section in 2012 with a $38.8 million bid. The construction contract was awarded to the Shimmick-Traylor-Granite Joint Venture (STGJV) in August 2016, who bid $874.8 million; construction started in December 2016.

The original design of the line forked it near Aloha Stadium into two routes, one passing South via Honolulu International Airport, and the other through Salt Lake, before reuniting at Middle Street in Kalihi. The city council initially decided to build the Salt Lake route before the airport route, as a result of horse-trading with City Councilmember Romy Cachola, whose constituents included Salt Lake residents and whose vote was needed to pass the decision. Soon after the city charter amendment on rail transit passed, the City Council reconsidered that decision, deciding to re-route the rail line to pass by Pearl Harbor and the airport and shelving the Salt Lake alignment as a future extension. While increasing construction costs by 4%, the airport route is expected to bring significantly higher ridership, as it will ferry workers to both the airport and the Pearl Harbor military base and shipyards.

The Airport section consists of 214 total spans. Like the earlier Farrington and Kamehameha sections, they are constructed using precast concrete box girder bridge segments, but for the Airport section, the segments are lifted and supported by an overhead gantry crane while they are tensioned. Both a conventional overhead gantry and an articulating gantry are being used during the guideway assembly. More than 2,700 precast segments are required for the Airport section, which also includes more than 230 columns for the piers and 5400 permanent sound walls. For the pier foundations, shafts were drilled up to 350 feet (110 m) deep, including one excavated to 357 feet 4 inches (108.92 m) with a diameter of 10 feet (3.0 m). This was believed to have established a new record for a drilled shaft caisson. The column, in Kalihi Stream on Kamehameha Highway between Middle Street and Puʻuhale Road, will be part of the support for Kahauiki station. Where the guideway contacts the supporting piers, custom bearings have been installed to accommodate movement ranging from 2 to 19 inches (51 to 483 mm) and rotation of 0.015–0.03 radians.

STGJV announced in December 2020 it had completed the last of the 2,708 precast concrete guideway segments for the Airport section, with this last segment scheduled to be installed over Ualena Street near Lagoon Drive in spring 2021. Each segment uses approximately 18 cu yd (14 m^{3}) of concrete. Finished segment weights vary between 80,000 to 130,000 lb (36,000 to 59,000 kg) and have dimensions of 30.5 feet (9.3 m) wide, 10.75 feet (3.28 m) long, and either 8.5 or 4.5 feet (2.6 or 1.4 m) high. The lower height is used in several places along the Airport section to accommodate overhead clearances and flight path restrictions.

=== Segment 3: City Center ===
Utility relocations on Dillingham Boulevard at the beginning of the Mauka Shift, near Kapalama Canal. The guideway will be built on the left of the equipment. (2025)

Segment 3 of the route to be completed will be the 3.3 mi (5.3 km) City Center section east from Kahauiki (Middle Street) station to Kaʻākaukukui (Civic Center) station. It includes six stations, including a downtown station. In August 2024, Parsons and Tutor Perini who bid $1.66 billion; won bids for design and construction for the city center section respectively. The City Center section officially broke ground on August 13, 2025.

Originally the 3.3 mi (5.3 km) section terminating at Kaʻākaukukui station, was supposed to be completed under a public-private partnership (PPP). It was estimated the City Center section will cost $1.6 billion to complete. Under the proposed PPP, the City Center section would be procured under a design-build-finance-operate-maintain (DBFOM) contract, which would award the successful bidder the right to operate and maintain the entire system for a period of 25 years after completing the City Center section. The City of Honolulu would retain oversight over operations and maintenance, public information, and responsibility for fare vending and enforcement. A contract for $400 million to clear utilities in the City Center section was awarded in May 2018.

HART issued a request for proposals (RFP) for the DBFOM contract for the City Center Guideway and Stations section in late 2018 and announced it had received proposals from several bidders by July 2020. However, the bids for the construction of the City Center Guideway and Stations significantly exceeded HART's cost estimates, at $2.7 billion compared to the $1.4 billion estimate, and HART officially discontinued pursuing a PPP approach to completing the City Center section in November 2020. The bids for the operation and maintenance portion of the contract (ranging from $4.2 to $5.3 billion) were closer to the estimate ($4.95 billion). On December 14, 2020, HART issued a request for information, asking for input from the construction industry for the best way to structure a RFP that would receive realistic bids. It was expected that this contract will be awarded and subsequently, construction will begin for the six stations and guideway in August 2024.

In 2021, due to rising costs regarding the complexity of the City Center utility relocations; the original $400 million contract for clearing utilities signed back in 2018 was terminated and this section of utility relocations was divided into two contracts, one for utility relocations on Dillingham Blvd between Kahauiki station and Kūwili station as well as another for the city center between Kūwili station and Kaʻākaukukui station. In addition to this, the utility relocations were significantly rescoped to save costs.

The significantly re-scoped utility relocations required modifying the original alignment in what was dubbed the "Mauka Shift". This involved various column changes, along with a rerouting of the guideway due to the amount of electricity, water, sewer, and fiber optic utilities on the southern half of Dillingham Boulevard (between Waiakamilo Road and Kaʻaahi Street); as a result, the guideway location was changed from within the median strip, instead moved mauka (inland) to the northern shoulder of the roadway. Subsequently, Niuhelewai station was redesigned to reflect this shift. Utility relocations between Kahauiki station and Kūwili station are expected to be completed in mid-2026, with guideway construction starting in mid to late 2026. To relocate power lines under the deep Kapalama Canal as part of the Mauka Shift, contractors used microtunneling to dig three tunnels underneath the waterway.

The utility relocations between Kūwili station and Kaʻākaukukui station is expected to be completed in August 2025, with guideway foundation construction beginning in September 2025 near Kūwili station.

As of August 2025, preparations for guideway construction such as geotechnical borings, load testing, roadway preparation such as creating road closures is occurring throughout the route, as well as property acquisition and archeological digs on Halekuwila Street near the Kaʻākaukukui station is underway.

A formal groundbreaking ceremony occurred on August 13, 2025 for load test foundations on the Civic Center station site.

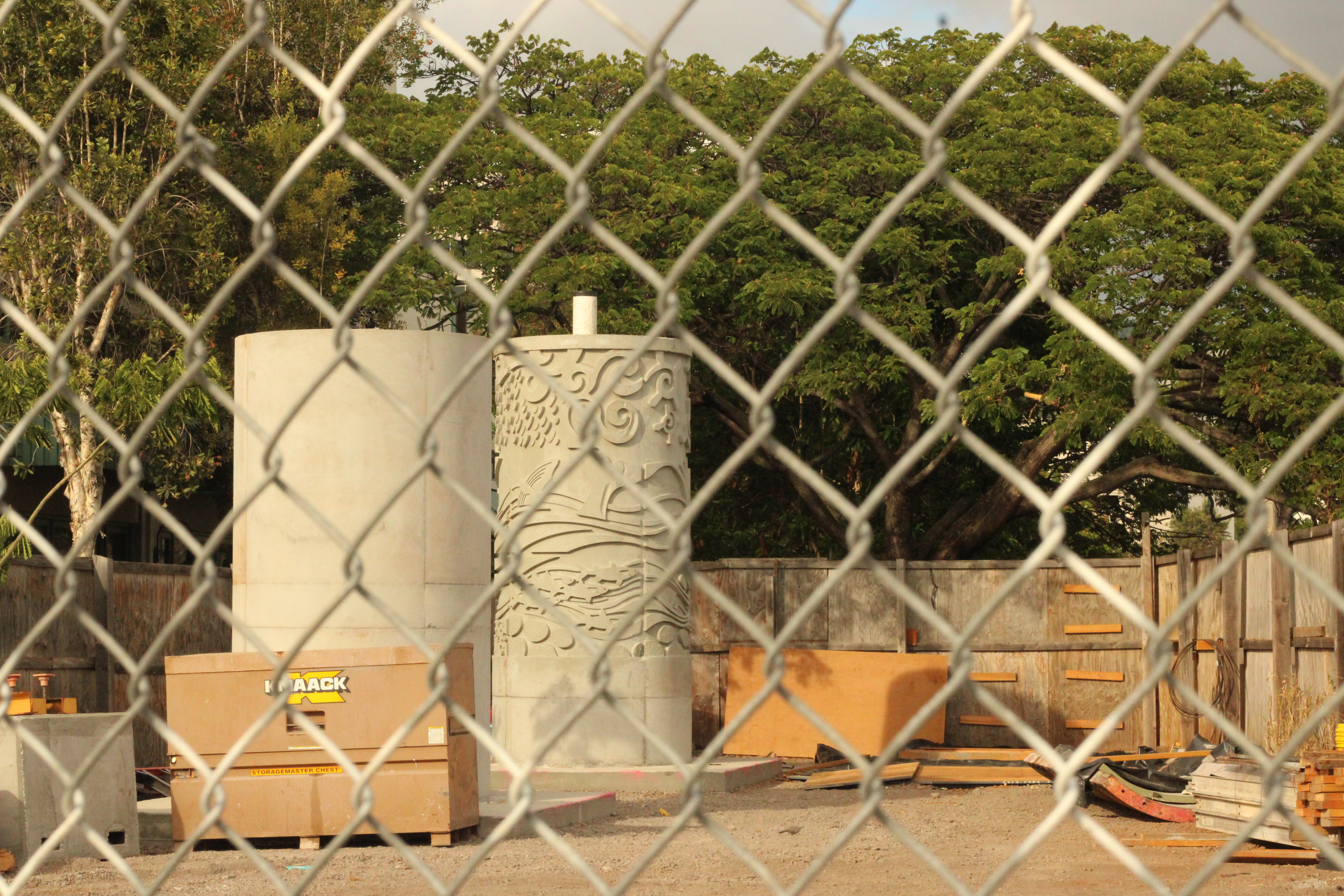
Test foundations, built early in the CCGS contract, including a sample of station engravings for Hōlau station. These functioned as load tests for the precast girder-based guideway. As these require larger capitals (caps on top of column) – compared to those for box girder sections – the capitals need to be separately installed. (2025)

In order to lower costs, construction company Tutor Perini's designs for this section differ from the earlier Farrington, Kamehameha, and Airport sections. Guideway construction will involve concrete girders rather than precast concrete box girder bridge segments, resulting in the guideway being constructed by crawler cranes rather than launching gantries. To save on maintenance costs, stations will abandon the use of fabric canopies, and instead use wood-clad steel canopies. Escalators will also be removed from all station plans, replaced by additional elevators. All stations will be constructed by their own sub-contractors.

Hōlau (Chinatown) station is planned to double as a public museum showcasing various artifacts found during utility relocations. The station will also be mixed-use, with nearby abandoned building converted into retail and a plaza for food trucks.

=== Ala Moana extension ===
Kūkuluaeʻo (Kakaʻako) and Kālia (Ala Moana Center) stations were included in the original plan for Skyline but had to be eliminated from the initial segments of construction due to a severe funding shortfall. Despite the indefinite deferral, the Honolulu Authority for Rapid Transportation says it remains committed to completing these stations in the future. In 2024, Tutor Perini offered to do this section as a $325 million "add on" project to its city center construction contract after winning the bid for the rail construction between Middle Street and Civic Center.

=== Potential future extensions ===
The long-term plan includes four additional extensions beyond Kualakaʻi (East Kapolei) and Kālia (Ala Moana Center). These include extensions East to University of Hawaiʻi at Mānoa and Waikīkī, West to Kalaeloa, and the link through Salt Lake which was dropped from initial plans. None of these extensions are currently funded, but steps are being done in preserving alignments; especially in regards to ongoing projects planned on these alignments.

==== Extensions East past Kālia (Ala Moana) ====
Past Kālia (Ala Moana), the alignment travels to a station at the Hawaiʻi Convention Center, then splits into two branches – one to the University of Hawaiʻi at Mānoa campus and the other to Waikīkī on Kuhio Avenue.

In November 2017, the rail authority took a first step towards preserving a corridor for the extension to UH Mānoa.

In 2023, The City and County of Honolulu started preserving the Waikīkī alignment by installing bus lanes on Kūhiō Avenue that could eventually be used for future columns, in addition to a future transit-only Kūhiō Avenue. Later that year, work also began for the future UH Mānoa alignment by installing bike lanes on University Avenue, which will eventually be able to be used for the future rail utility relocations and columns between Mōʻiliʻili and UH Mānoa stations.

==== Extensions past Kualakaʻi (East Kapolei) ====
In addition to this; one extension is planned west from Kualakaʻi (East Kapolei) to Kalaeloa.

In 2021, The City and County of Honolulu has started planning to move the Kapolei Transit Center closer to the future Kalaeloa alignment.

In June 2025, HART said that studies and preliminary planning for the future Kalaeloa alignment were underway, in the hopes of allowing it to be constructed at the same time as the Ala Moana extension.

==== Salt Lake extension ====
The link through Salt Lake between Hālawa (Aloha Stadium) and Kahauiki (Middle Street) which was dropped from initial plans is being planned as an extension.

On April 29, 2021, Phase 3 of the Salt Lake Boulevard Widening Project commenced. This is upgrading the final 2-lane part of Salt Lake Boulevard to 4 lanes. In addition to this, this project also makes this part of the Salt Lake corridor compatible for the future Salt Lake extension.

== Operations ==
=== Stations ===
Local construction company Nan, Inc. won contracts to build six of the nine western stations in 2015; the West Oahu Station Group contract (for Kualakaʻi, Keoneʻae, and Honouliuli) was worth $56.1 million, and the Kamehameha Highway contract (for Waiawa, Kalauao, and Hālawa) was worth $116 million. The Farrington Highway Station Group contract (for Hōʻaeʻae, Pouhala, and Hālaulani) was awarded in 2015 to Hawaiian Dredging for $79 million. STGJV was awarded the contract to build the four Airport section stations (Makalapa, Lelepaua, Āhua, and Kahauiki) as part of their $875 million contract. Tutor Perini was awarded the contract to build the six city center section stations (Mokauea, Niuhelewai, Kūwili, Hōlau, Kuloloia, and Kaʻākaukukui) as part of their $1.66 billion contract.

The Hawaiian Station Naming Working Group (HSNWG) was named by the Honolulu City Council in 2009 to develop Hawaiian names for each Skyline station. HSNWG proposed Hawaiian names for the nine rail stations on the ʻEwa end of the rail system in November 2017, and HART adopted the proposed names in February 2018. In April 2019, HSNWG recommended its names for the remaining 12 rail stations on the eastern end of the rail system, between Pearl Harbor and Ala Moana Center.

All stations have restrooms that riders must ask a station attendant to unlock before using. They are described as being "secured access", in order to deter vandalism and improve the safety and security of stations, yet are "available for the public."

==== List of stations ====
| # | Name | | Location | Segment | Opening | Notes |
| # | Hawaiian | English | Location | Segment | Opening | Notes |
|---|---|---|---|---|---|---|
| 1 | Kualakaʻi | East Kapolei | East Kapolei | Segment 1; 10.8 mi 17.4 km | June 30, 2023 | Serves Kapolei, Makakilo, Kalaeloa, ʻEwa, Ka Makana Alii Shopping Center, Kroc Center and ʻEwa Beach |
| 2 | Keoneʻae | University of Hawaiʻi–West Oʻahu | East Kapolei | Segment 1; 10.8 mi 17.4 km | June 30, 2023 | Serves the University of Hawaiʻi–West Oʻahu campus and Honouliuli; Park and ride: 304 spaces |
| 3 | Honouliuli | Hoʻopili | East Kapolei | Segment 1; 10.8 mi 17.4 km | June 30, 2023 | Serves Honouliuli; Park and ride: 344 spaces |
| 4 | Hōʻaeʻae | West Loch | Waipahu | Segment 1; 10.8 mi 17.4 km | June 30, 2023 | Serves West Loch, ʻEwa, ʻEwa Beach, Kunia, and Waipahu; Park and ride: 21 spaces (temporary lot) |
| 5 | Pouhala | Waipahu Transit Center | Waipahu | Segment 1; 10.8 mi 17.4 km | June 30, 2023 | Serves Waipahu and Waikele |
| 6 | Hālaulani | Leeward Community College | Pearl City | Segment 1; 10.8 mi 17.4 km | June 30, 2023 | Serves Leeward Community College and Pearl City |
| 7 | Waiawa | Pearl Highlands | Pearl City | Segment 1; 10.8 mi 17.4 km | June 30, 2023 | Serves Pearl Highlands, the Pearl Highlands Center, and Pearl City |
| 8 | Kalauao | Pearlridge | Waimalu | Segment 1; 10.8 mi 17.4 km | June 30, 2023 | Serves the Pearlridge Center, Pearl City, Waimalu, and ʻAiea; Park and ride: 16 spaces (temporary lot) |
| 9 | Hālawa | Aloha Stadium | Hālawa | Segment 1; 10.8 mi 17.4 km | June 30, 2023 | Serves Aloha Stadium, ʻAiea, Salt Lake, Ford Island, Pearl Harbor Memorial, Pearl Harbor, and Moanalua; Park and ride: 590 spaces |
| 10 | Makalapa | Joint Base Pearl Harbor–Hickam | Honolulu | Segment 2; 5.1 mi 8.2 km | October 16, 2025 | Serves Joint Base Pearl Harbor–Hickam, Moanalua, and Salt Lake |
| 11 | Lelepaua | Daniel K. Inouye International Airport | Honolulu | Segment 2; 5.1 mi 8.2 km | October 16, 2025 | Serves Daniel K. Inouye International Airport, Moanalua, and Salt Lake |
| 12 | Āhua | Lagoon Drive | Honolulu | Segment 2; 5.1 mi 8.2 km | October 16, 2025 | Serves Lagoon Drive, Moanalua, Keehi Lagoon Park, and Mapunapuna |
| 13 | Kahauiki | Middle Street–Kalihi Transit Center | Honolulu | Segment 2; 5.1 mi 8.2 km | October 16, 2025 | Serves Kalihi, Fort Shafter, Moanalua, Sand Island, and Honolulu Harbor |
| 14 | Mokauea | Kalihi | Honolulu | Segment 3; 3.3 mi 5.3 km | 2031 (scheduled) | Serves Kalihi, Bishop Museum, and Honolulu Harbor |
| 15 | Niuhelewai | Honolulu Community College–Kapalāma | Honolulu | Segment 3; 3.3 mi 5.3 km | 2031 (scheduled) | Serves Kalihi, Kapālama, Honolulu Harbor, and Honolulu Community College |
| 16 | Kūwili | Iwilei | Honolulu | Segment 3; 3.3 mi 5.3 km | 2031 (scheduled) | Serves Iwilei, Kalihi, Nuʻuanu Pali, Honolulu Harbor, Kuakini, Kuakini Medical Center, and Liliha |
| 17 | Hōlau | Chinatown | Honolulu | Segment 3; 3.3 mi 5.3 km | 2031 (scheduled) | Serves Chinatown, Nuʻuanu Pali, Hawaii Theatre, Foster Botanical Garden, Liliʻuokalani Botanical Garden, Izumo Taishakyo Hawaii, and Honolulu Harbor |
| 18 | Kuloloia | Downtown | Honolulu | Segment 3; 3.3 mi 5.3 km | 2031 (scheduled) | Serves Downtown Honolulu, Aloha Tower, Honolulu Harbor, Honolulu Harbor Cruise Terminals, and the Capital District |
| 19 | Kaʻākaukukui | Civic Center | Honolulu | Segment 3; 3.3 mi 5.3 km | 2031 (scheduled) | Serves Our Kakaʻako, Capital District, Kakaʻako, Alapai Transit Center, Ward Village, Queen's Hospital, JABSOM, UH Cancer Center, Kakaʻako Waterfront Park, and Punchbowl |
| 20 | Kūkuluaeʻo | Kakaʻako | Honolulu | Ala Moana extension 0.8 mi 1.3 km | TBD | Serves Ward Village, Kakaʻako, Blaisdell Center, Ala Moana Beach Park, Kakaʻako Waterfront Park, Discovery Center, Honolulu Museum of Art, Straub Medical Center, and Makiki |
| 21 | Kālia | Ala Moana Center | Honolulu | Ala Moana extension 0.8 mi 1.3 km | TBD | Serves Ala Moana, Ala Moana Center, Ala Moana Beach Park, Hawaii Convention Center, Kaheka, Waikīkī, Fort DeRussy, Kapiolani Medical Center, McCully, and Manoa |

=== Ridership ===
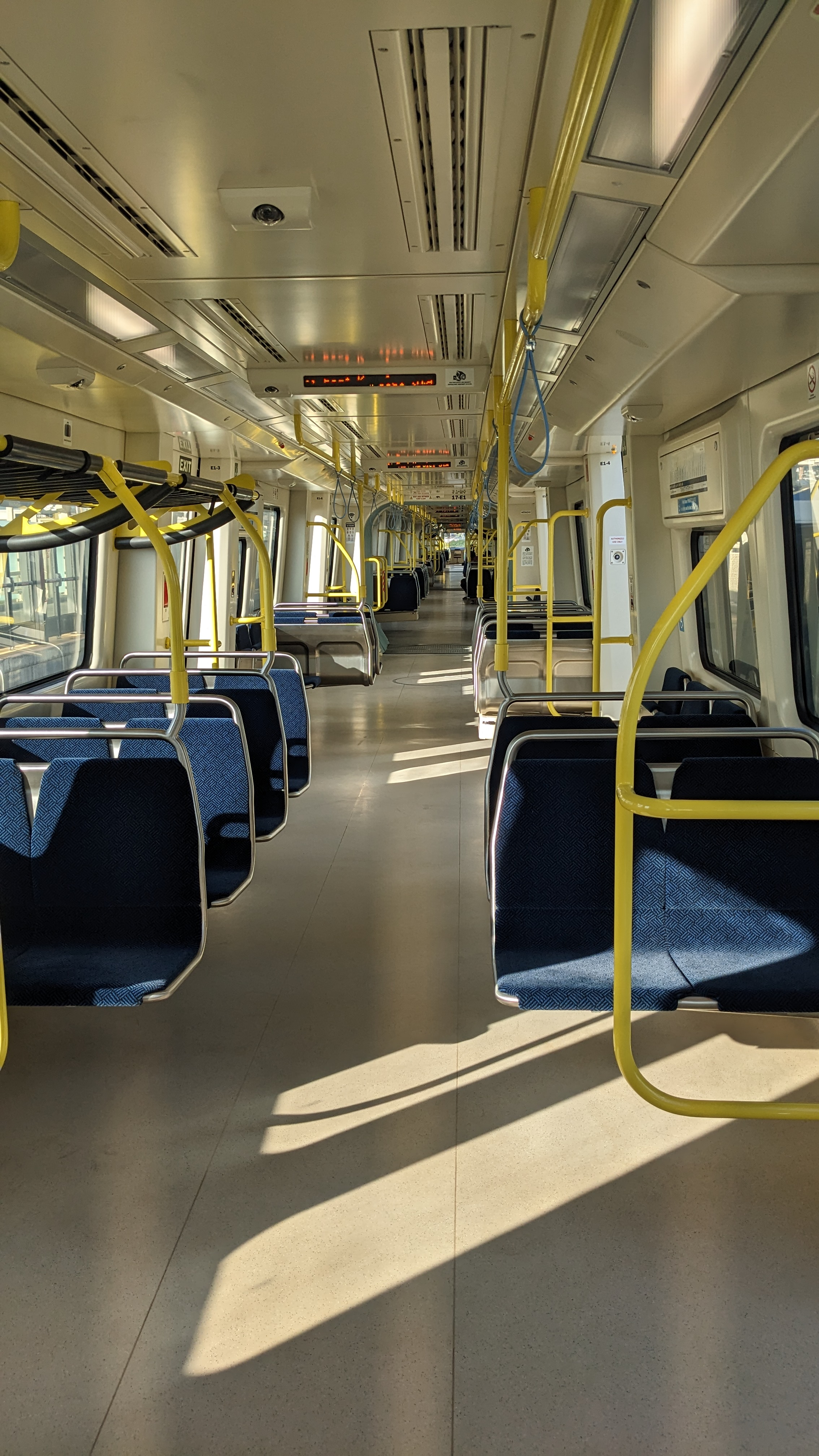
Interior of a Skyline train

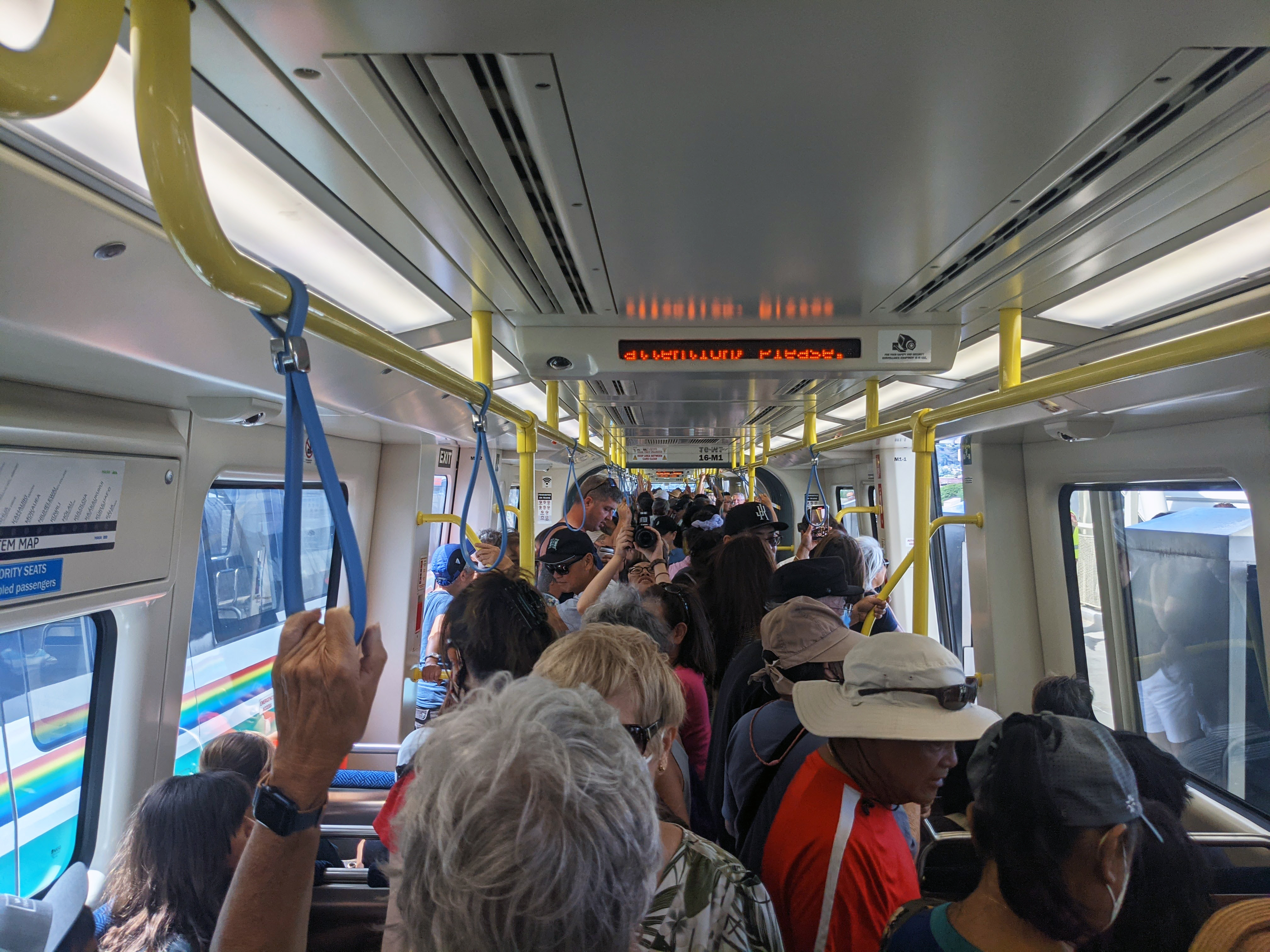
Passengers aboard Skyline on opening day (2023)

When fully complete, Skyline trains are expected to carry more than 6,000 people per hour, with each train carrying over 300 passengers. That works to 20 trains per hour, or one train every three minutes. Hours of operation were planned to be between 4 a.m. and midnight. In 2023, it was estimated that Segment 1 would see 8,000 to 10,000 daily riders after one year of opening, that the opening of Segment 2 (in 2025) would see see 25,000 daily riders, and that the opening of Segment 3 (in 2031) would see 85,000 daily riders. Upon opening a future extension to Ala Moana, Skyline is projected to serve an estimated 119,600 daily riders.

==== Segment 1 ridership ====
During its opening weekend, between 2 p.m. on Friday, June 30 and 7 p.m. on Sunday, July 2, 2023, Skyline saw 40,668 riders, equivalent to 1,564 passengers per service hour. During the first five days of service, which were fare-free, Skyline saw a total of 71,722 passengers.

Under Segment 1, from June 30, 2023 to October 15, 2025, Skyline reported a ridership of 2,727,473 riders, a weekday average of 3,780 riders, and average on-time percentage of 99.37%.

==== Segment 2 ridership ====
In October 2025, which saw the opening of Segment 2 to Middle Street, ridership for the month totaled 241,373, or 10,423 daily riders after the segment's opening, triple the ridership prior to the opening. Between July 1, 2025 and December 31, 2025, Skyline recorded 1,111,037 riders, with Segment 2 ridership accounting for 43.31% of 2025's annual total.

Quarter 1 of 2026 ridership recorded 874,963 riders, with a weekday average of 11,114. Quarter 2 of 2026 recorded 960,954 riders and a weekday average of 11,566. Quarter 3 of 2026 recorded 991,757 riders and a weekday average of 12,588, with all three quarters yielding over 2.79 million riders.

Honolulu Skyline ridership totals from October 2023 to October 2026

=== Fares ===
Stations are equipped with fare gates and ticket vending machines (TVMs). Fares may be purchased by passengers and loaded onto HOLO cards, which also facilitate transfers to TheBus, providing an unlimited number of free transfers for 2.5 hours after any boarding. The base cost of an empty HOLO card is $2. TVMs interfaces are available in English, Hawaiian, Samoan, Tagalog, Ilocano, Japanese, Chinese, and Korean.

Discounted fares are available to senior, youth, low-income, and disabled riders.

=== Rail Operations Center ===
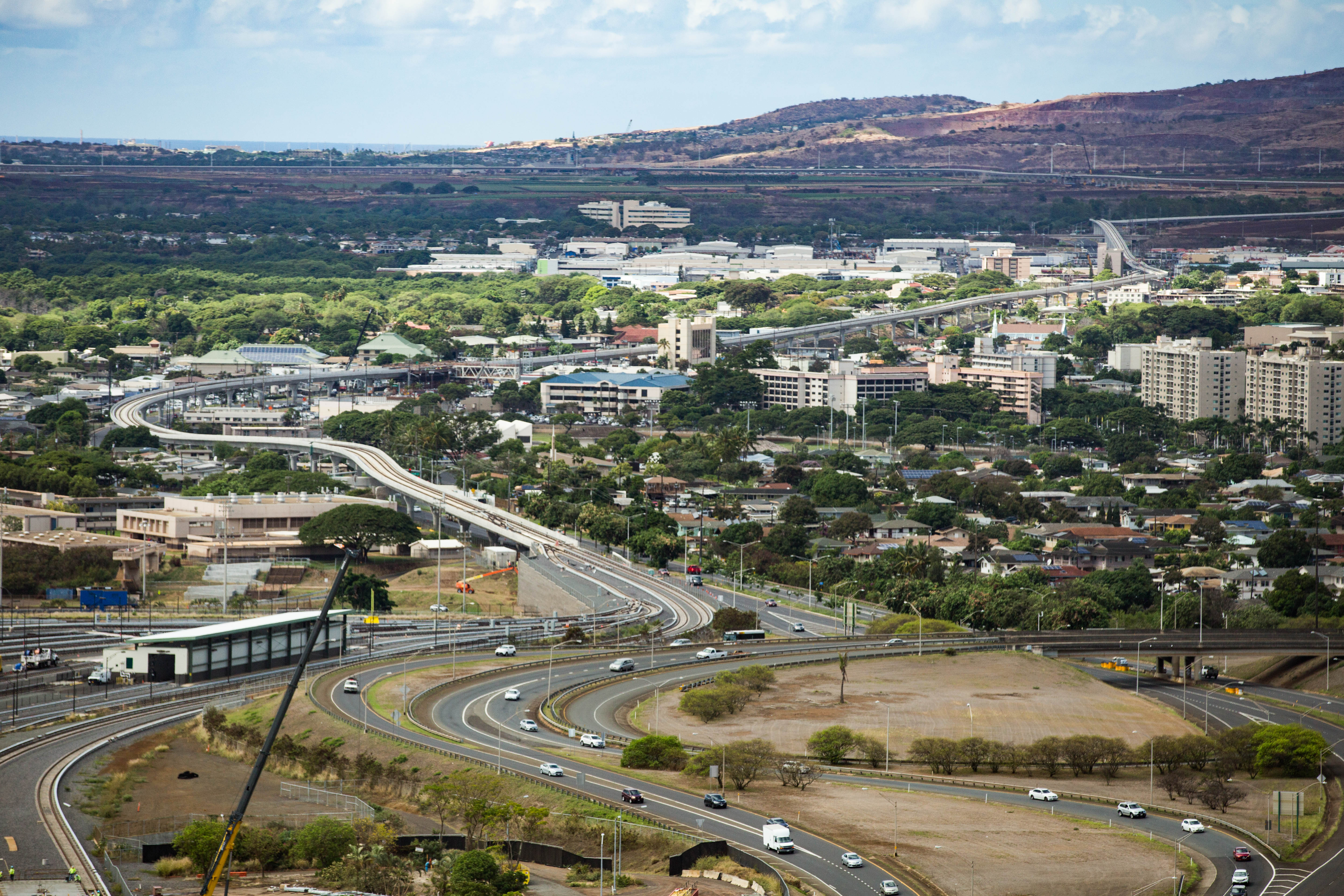
Honolulu Rail Transit guideway (2017), view directed west. The Train Wash Facility (TWF) is in the lower left.

The Rail Operations Center (ROC; also known as the Maintenance and Storage Facility) is the 43-acre (17 ha) railyard, operations, and maintenance facility, located between the campuses of Leeward Community College and Waipahu High School, just west of Hālaulani station. The design has been awarded LEED Silver certification.

The four buildings on the ROC campus are:

- Operation & Servicing Building (OSB) – Housing primary vehicle maintenance facilities and the Operations and Control Center, where operators will monitor and control vehicle movement
- Maintenance of Way Building (MOW) – Housing equipment used to inspect and repair tracks
- Train Wash Facility (TWF) – An automated facility to clean vehicle exteriors
- Wheel Truing Building (WTB) – A maintenance facility for vehicle wheels

The contract for the ROC was awarded to the Kiewit/Kobayashi Joint Venture in 2011. The contract was initially awarded at a cost of $195 million; when the ROC was completed in July 2016, the actual incurred costs were $274 million.

=== Rolling stock ===
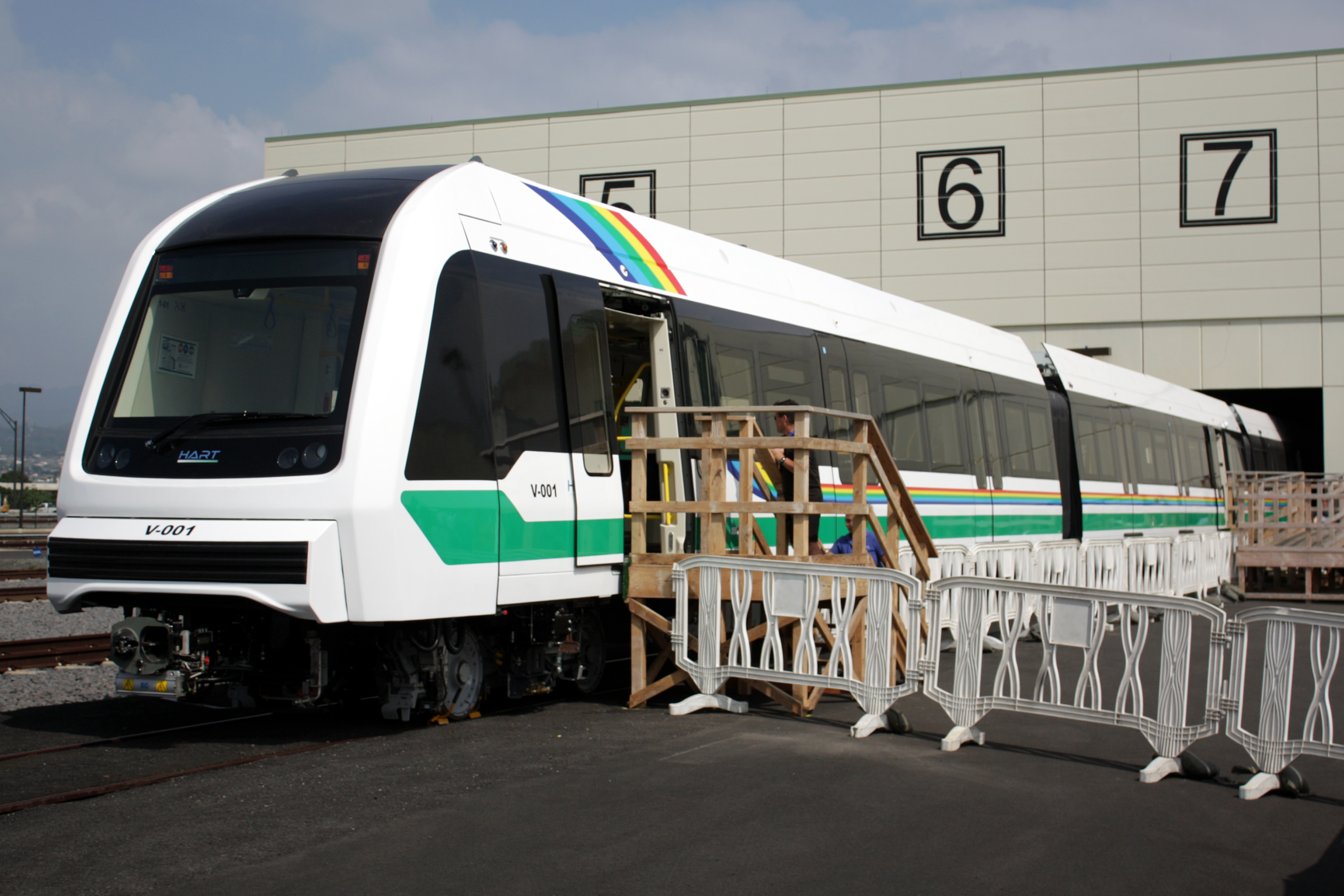
First trainset on public display in February 2017

Although several other technologies were considered, including technologies commonly used for airport people mover systems like rubber tires, maglev, cable-hauled, and monorail, then-mayor Mufi Hannemann strongly believed in "steel on steel" construction, saying "I will not put this city in a position of financial disaster […] If it's not 'steel on steel,' I'll pull the plug." The line uses 256 ft (78 m) four-car train sets, each with the capacity to carry nearly 800 passengers, similar in weight to heavy rail systems elsewhere in the United States (such as the Chicago 'L' in Chicago, Illinois). Physically, the Honolulu system resembles light rapid transit systems such as New Taipei's Circular Line which uses the same technology, Vancouver's SkyTrain, the Copenhagen Metro, and the Docklands Light Railway in London, but is legally classified as a heavy rail system. The system is the first in the U.S. (outside of airport people mover systems) to feature platform gates in conjunction with driverless operation. Rolling stock for the line includes 80 cars in 20 four-car train sets. Each car is 64 ft (20 m) long, weighs 72,000 lb (33,000 kg), and has 36 seats with a listed total capacity of 195 people, and sits on standard-gauge (1,435 mm) rails. The cars are powered by a third rail electrification system, delivering 750 V DC.

==== Contract and delivery ====
The contract for railcars (named the Core Systems Design-Build-Operate-Maintain Services contract) was signed on November 28, 2011, with a joint venture between Hitachi Rail Italy (then known as AnsaldoBreda) and Hitachi Rail STS (then known as Ansaldo STS). The companies previously collaborated on the construction and operation of vehicles for the Copenhagen Metro and the Brescia Metro. Both companies were later purchased by Hitachi in 2015 and the Ansaldo Honolulu Joint Venture was renamed to Hitachi Rail Honolulu (HRH).

Under the $1.1 billion contract, HRH is responsible for designing and fabricating railcars ($574 million), pre-revenue testing to validate train performance ($167 million), and operations and maintenance (O&M) during the first five years of revenue service ($339 million). There is an option to continue O&M services for HART for an additional five years ($318 million).

The two unsuccessful bidders for the railcar contract, Bombardier and Sumitomo, filed protests over the award. Both protests were rejected during the administrative process, but Bombardier sought judicial review of their protest. The decision against Bombardier's protest was affirmed by both the state Circuit Court and the Intermediate Court of Appeals.

The first two cars arrived in Hawaiʻi in March 2016, and the first train was unveiled to the public at the Rail Operations Center on May 2, 2016. To meet "Buy America" requirements for federally-funded transit projects, the bodyshells are fabricated at the Hitachi Rail Italy plant in Reggio Calabria, Italy, then shipped to Hitachi Rail's plant in Pittsburg, California for final assembly.

In December 2016, Hitachi Rail Italy reported defects were discovered in the welds in the extruded aluminum beams of twenty-seven car shells, four of which were already in Hawaiʻi. The manufacturer will fix the problems, but warned delivery may be delayed as production of new vehicles will be halted. In March 2017, HART said they would meet the interim opening needs after repair of the defective cars and that full opening would not be affected.

In May 2017, trains were towed on tracks in Honolulu for the first time to check clearances. Testing of trains under their own power commenced in October 2017.

== Timeline of progress ==
- February 2006 – A draft transportation plan includes $2.5 billion for a fixed-rail system between Kapolei and Mānoa.
- June 2006 – Officials estimate the infrastructure construction cost at estimated at $3 billion, $200 million more than a previous estimate, for a 24-mile system. This does not include the cost of the trains.
- January 2007 – The General Excise Tax (GET) within the City and County of Honolulu is increased by 0.5% with the extra funds earmarked for a mass transit system. The increase was set to expire on December 31, 2022.
- February 2007 – The City Council approves the Minimum Operating Segment from East Kapolei to Ala Moana Center, via Salt Lake Boulevard.
- October 2008 – The Draft Environmental Impact Statement (DEIS) is released to the public. The projected cost is $3.7 billion including $1 billion for contingencies.
- November 2008 – Fifty-three percent of voters support measures to give the Honolulu City Council authority to proceed with "establishment of a steel wheel on steel rail transit system". The estimated cost is $4 billion.
- January 2009 – The middle portion of the route between Aloha Stadium and Middle Street is amended to have stations at the Pearl Harbor Naval Base and the Honolulu Airport which had one of the original options. The previous route followed Salt Lake Boulevard.
- June 2010 – The Final Environmental Impact Statement (FEIS) is released to the public. Estimated cost is $5.5 billion. Patronage by 2030 is projected to be 116,300 riders per day.
- December 2010 – A report, commissioned by outgoing Governor Lingle, is released which warns the project could cost at least $1.7 billion more than the city's projected $5.5 billion price tag.
- March 2012 – Dan Grabauskas becomes executive director and CEO of HART on a three-year contract. He takes his position in April 2012.
- May 2012 – Construction workers started pouring concrete on the foundations that will hold the rail columns.
- December 2012 – Honolulu City Council and the Federal Transit Authority (FTA) sign agreement for the project with a budget of $5.12 billion including $1.55 billion provided by the Federal Government. Full system revenue service is projected for January 31, 2020.
- September 2014 – HART canceled the initial tender for the first nine stations after the bids were higher than budget. "The lowest bid by Nan, Inc. came in at $294.5 million, or $110 million more than the $184 million the transit authority had budgeted." The first trips on the railway are expected to be delayed, probably until 2018.
- November 2015 – FTA withholds payment of a $250 million allotment until the council could show it had sufficient funding to complete the project.
- January 2016 – Five year extension to the General Excise Tax surcharge adopted to add $1.2 billion in funding.
- May 2016 – HART chairwoman Colleen Hanabusa shared a confidential document detailing budget estimates as of March 1, 2016, showing that the rail project is expected to cost $6.9 billion.
- April 2016 – An audit of the project by the City criticized HART for using outdated financial figures and budgets, lack of documentation for "change orders", and warned the HART estimates of the cost overruns were unreliable. HART officials disputed the audit's findings.
- May 2016 – The FTA revealed that they estimate the total cost as $8.1 billion for the 20 mi (32 km) line. In addition completion of the rail system would be delayed nearly five years until December 2024, versus HART's federal funding agreement stating that full line service from East Kapolei to Ala Moana Center would start in January 2020.
- June 2016 – Report from Jacobs Engineering, the project management oversight contractor, says that under a worst-case scenario the final cost would $10.79 billion.
- August 2016 – Dan Grabauskas resigns as CEO and executive director of HART but will be the official CEO until October 2016. From August until October, the Department of Transportation Service Director Mike Formby served as interim CEO.
- October 2016 – Krishniah N. Murthy named interim CEO and executive director of HART and served in this position until December 2017.
- April 2017 – HART sent a "Recovery Plan" to the FTA which concluded that completion of the original 21 station route was the only viable plan. The new project cost given is $8.165 billion with media reports indicating that after financing costs are included it will be over $10 billion. Opening of part of the system, from East Kapolei to Aloha Stadium, is scheduled for the end of 2020 with final completion of the full route by December 2025. The project is reported to be 36 percent complete as of March 2017.
- July 2017 – Andrew Robbins named new CEO and executive director of HART at a base salary of $317,000, replacing interim CEO and Executive Director Krishniah N. Murthy in December 2017.
- September 2017 – A new law is enacted to extend and increase taxes to raise an additional $2.4 billion for the project. The GET surcharge is extended by three years to 2030 (generating about $1 billion) and a surcharge of one percent is placed on the statewide hotel room tax for 13 years (generating $1.3 billion). HART submits a new recovery plan to the FTA with an estimated final cost of $9.02 billion with savings attributed to reduced financing costs given the new taxes.
- January 2020 – Andrew Robbins, executive director and CEO of the Honolulu Authority for Rapid Transportation, said the first 10 miles of the Honolulu rail system would be completed by December 2020 as predicted, and will also be ready to run passenger service between Kapolei and Aloha Stadium three months earlier, by October 20, 2020. Robbins said he was so confident of the new date that he was willing to stick his neck out.
- May 2020 – "Completion of the first 10-mile segment of the line from East Kapolei to Aloha Stadium, originally scheduled for October, will be delayed by about eight weeks, according to Honolulu Authority for Rapid Transportation executive director Andrew Robbins... And the city, which had forecast opening the line to riders by December, has pushed that date back to next March."
- June 2020 – "More recently, the FTA has been projecting the project would be finished in September 2026, and insisted that the city incorporate that later date into its 2019 rail 'recovery plan.'"
- July 2020 – The city finally received much-anticipated proposals from private industry to finish the project's major remaining construction work and then run the system for its first 30 years. The bids won't be publicly released until the contract is awarded by unidentified officials.
- September 2020 – One of the PPP bidders for the final city center segment from Middle Street to Ala Moana Center revealed themselves during a recent quarterly earnings call. Ronald Tutor, CEO of Tutor Perini, disclosed that his company is part of the Tutor Perini / Parsons joint venture for the final segment of Honolulu rail. While HART estimated that this last stretch would cost $1.4 billion, Tutor stated that his company's bid was “over $2 billion.”
- October 2020 – “The estimated cost of rail has jumped once again, bringing the construction and interest tab to the $10 billion threshold. The mayor tells us it will probably grow more, and the shortfall to pay for it all now tops more than $1.2 billion.”
- November 2020 – In an effort to keep $250 million in federal funding from lapsing at the end of the year, Mayor Kirk Caldwell bypassed HART CEO Andrew Robbins and sent a letter to the Federal Transit Authority requesting a one-year extension through the end of 2021. A rough outline of a plan included in the letter suggested a total cost of $11.2 billion including approximately $1 billion in financing costs, and a completion date of 2033.
- December 2020 – HART received bids for the city center segment from two private-sector teams: $2.775 billion by City Center Connection Group and $2.73 billion by Imua Transit Honolulu, vs HART's budget of $1.4 billion.
- March 2021 – Under new leadership, HART announces an updated, official completion date of 2031, with revenue service on the initial segment from Kapolei to Aloha Stadium beginning by the end of 2022.
- December 2021 – “The head of the Honolulu Authority for Rapid Transportation says next summer is the earliest the rail system could begin partial operations.”
- April 2022 – HART announces tight gage and weld modifications have been completed, with final 90-day testing to begin in the summer.
- June 2022 – "The Honolulu Authority for Rapid Transportation says it’s hopeful residents will be using trains by the end of the year – even as construction in the urban corridor continues."
- August 2022 – HART begins the 90-day trial testing phase.
- September 2022 – "The Federal Transit Administration has approved the Honolulu rail's financial recovery plan which outlines a truncated version of the rail line, 1.25 miles short of Ala Moana Center."
- May 2023 – Honolulu Mayor Rick Blangiardi and the Department of Transportation Services announce that Segment 1 (the first nine stations from East Kapolei to Aloha Stadium) will open to the public at 2 p.m. on June 30, 2023. Segment 2 (four stations between Aloha Stadium and Middle Street–Kalihi Transit Center, serving the Daniel K. Inouye International Airport) is announced to open in the summer of 2025, and that Segment 3 (six stations from Middle Street–Kalihi Transit Center to Civic Center) will open in 2031.
- June 2023 – Skyline Segment 1 begins operations. The "Skyline" name is announced two weeks before opening, inspired by the Hawaiian manu-o-Kū. This establishes an official name, having been colloquially termed "rail" for much of its development.
- June 2024 – Electrification of Segment 2 begins. The service operation date is revised from summer 2025 to late 2025.
- March 2025 – Mayor Blangiardi announces that Segment 2 is scheduled to open on October 1, 2025, with construction of Segment 3 beginning the same year.
- August 2025 – Segment 2's first day of passenger service is announced as October 16, 2025. Construction begins on Segment 3 and is expected to be completed in 2030.
- October 2025 – Segment 2 is officially opened to the public.
