= Mokauea station =

Future Honolulu Skyline station

Mokauea Kalihi

General information
- Location: Dillingham Boulevard & Mokauea Street; Honolulu, Hawaiʻi
- Coordinates: 21°19′42″N 157°52′52″W
- Owner: Honolulu Department of Transportation Services
- Platforms: 2 side platforms
- Tracks: 2

Construction
- Structure type: Elevated
- Accessible: Yes

History
- Opening: 2031; 5 years' time

Future services
Preceding station	Skyline	Following station
Kahauiki toward Kualakaʻi	Skyline (Segment 3)	Niuhelewai toward Kaʻākaukukui
Location

Mokauea station (also known as Kalihi station) is a planned Skyline station in Honolulu, Hawaiʻi. It will be built as part of Segment 3 of the Skyline route, scheduled to open in 2031.

The Hawaiian Station Name Working Group proposed Hawaiian names for the twelve rail stations on the eastern end of the rail system (stations in the Airport and City Center segments) in April 2019. The name of this station, Mokauea, is derived from an ancient place name and refers to the largest island off the Kalihi ahupuaʻa. Construction began in 2025 and is ongoing.
