= Honouliuli station =

Honolulu Skyline station

Honouliuli Hoʻopili
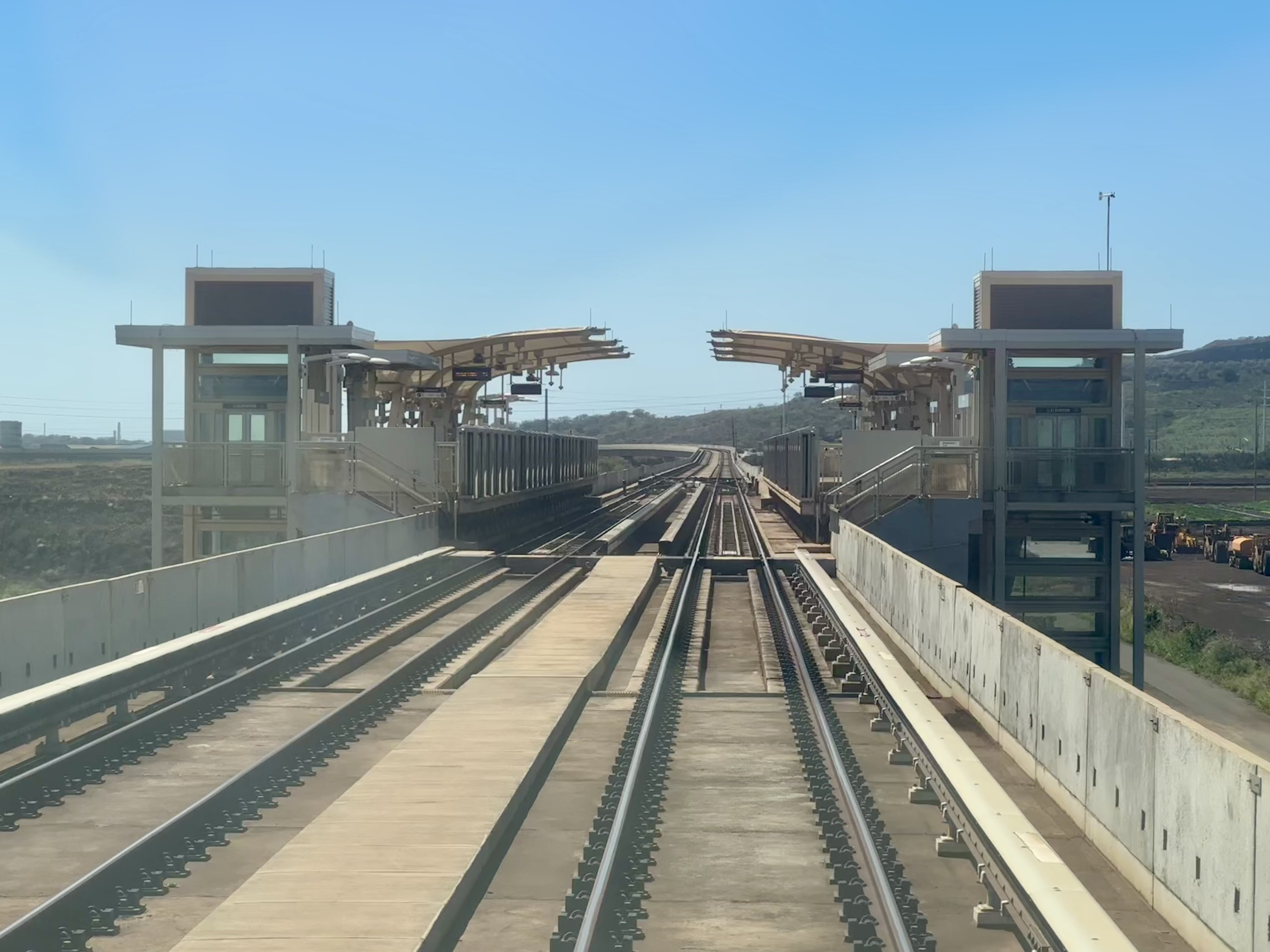
- Honouliuli station in January 2025

General information
- Location: 91-1251 Farrington Highway; East Kapolei, Hawaiʻi
- Coordinates: 21°22′03″N 158°02′39″W
- Owner: Honolulu Department of Transportation Services
- Platforms: 2 side platforms
- Tracks: 2

Construction
- Structure type: Elevated
- Parking: 344 spaces
- Accessible: Yes

History
- Opened: June 30, 2023; 3 years ago

Services
Preceding station	Skyline	Following station
Keoneʻae toward Kualakaʻi	Skyline	Hōʻaeʻae toward Kahauiki
Location

Honouliuli station (also known as Hoʻopili station) is a Skyline metro station in East Kapolei, Hawaiʻi. It opened on June 30, 2023, and includes a 344-space park and ride lot.

In Hawaiian, "honouliuli" means "dark bay" and is the name of the ahupuaʻa in which it is located. The Hawaiian Station Name Working Group proposed Hawaiian names for the nine rail stations on the ʻEwa end of the rail system (stations west of and including Aloha Stadium) in November 2017, and HART adopted the proposed names on February 22, 2018.

== Service ==
Skyline trains run every 10 minutes. Service operates from 5 a.m. to 7 p.m. on weekdays and from 8 a.m. to 7 p.m. on weekends and holidays.

== Station information ==
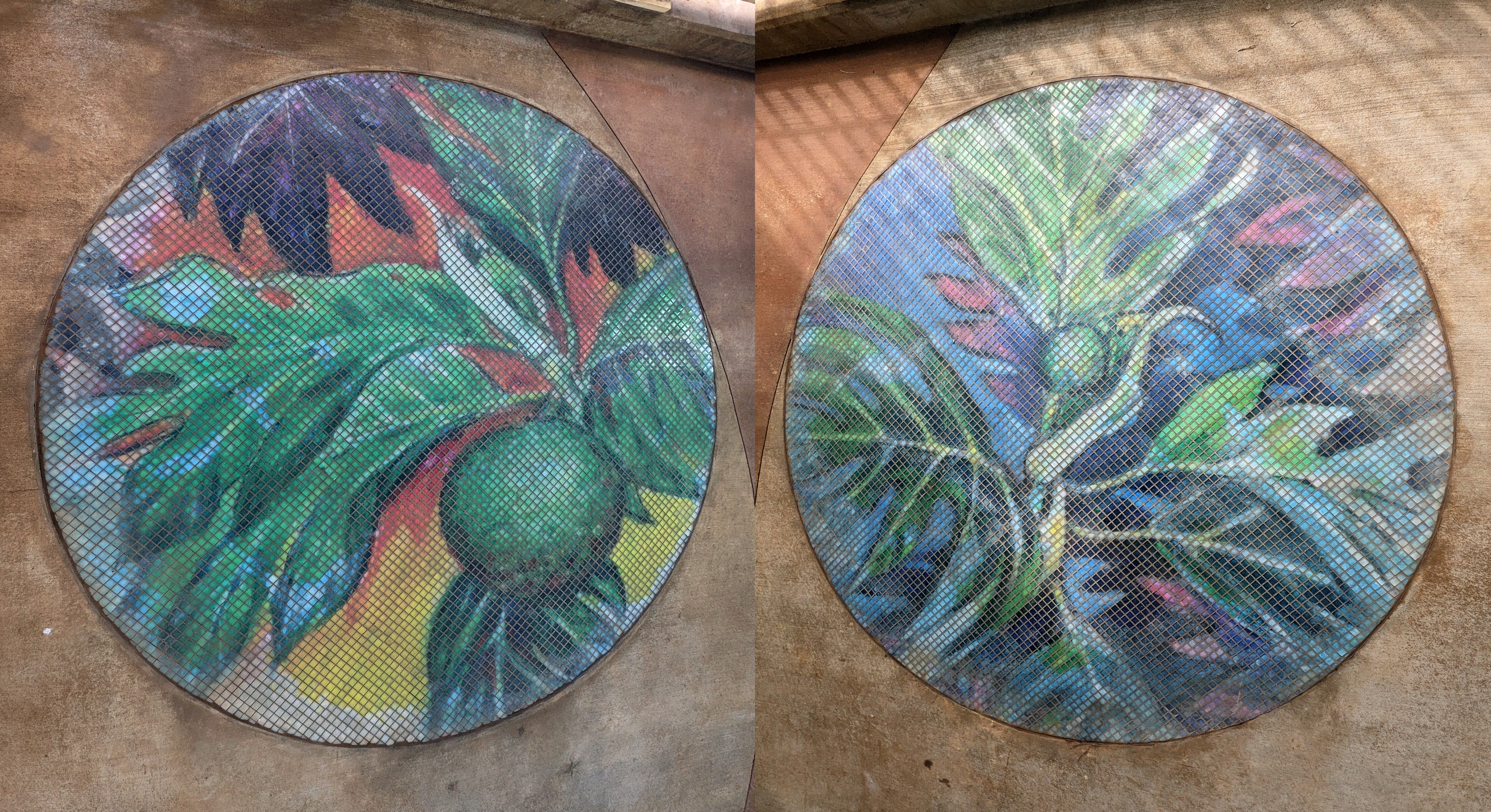
ʻUlu Day (left) and ʻUlu Night (right) by Karen Lucas

When all 19 stations are open in 2031, Honouliuli is projected to rank 14th in boardings at 3,110 per day.

The adjacent park and ride lot has the potential for 400 additional spaces to be added in the near future if warranted by ridership.

Public art is present at the station via the Station Art Program. Two glass mosaics serve as floor murals near each staircase on either side of the station, titled ʻUlu Night and ʻUlu Day by local artist Karen Lucas. The artworks represent the station's location as where a legendary ʻulu (breadfruit) tree named Kauluokāhaʻi once stood.

== Surrounding area ==
The station is located between the University of Hawaiʻi at West Oʻahu and the western edge of Waipahu. In the future, it will serve as the main station of the Ho‘opili community of 11,750 residences mixed with businesses, which is located a 10-minute walk (half mile) away. The area will also see the development of five public schools, including an elementary school located a two-block walk from the station and a 3,200-student high school two blocks further. By 2031, an estimated 3,200 homes are slated to be built in Hoʻopili.
