= Niuhelewai station =

Future Honolulu Skyline station

Niuhelewai Honolulu Community College–Kapālama

General information
- Location: Dillingham Boulevard & Kokea Street; Honolulu, Hawaiʻi
- Coordinates: 21°19′18″N 157°52′21″W
- Owner: Honolulu Department of Transportation Services
- Platforms: 2 side platforms
- Tracks: 2

Construction
- Structure type: Elevated
- Accessible: Yes

History
- Opening: 2031; 5 years' time

Future services
Preceding station	Skyline	Following station
Mokauea toward Kualakaʻi	Skyline (Segment 3)	Kūwili toward Kaʻākaukukui
Location

Niuhelewai station (also known as Honolulu Community College–Kapālama station) is a planned Skyline station in Honolulu, Hawaiʻi. It will be built as part of Segment 3 of the Skyline route, scheduled to open in 2031.

The Hawaiian Station Name Working Group proposed Hawaiian names for the twelve rail stations on the eastern end of the rail system (stations in the Airport and City Center segments) in April 2019. The name of this station, Niuhelewai, means "coconut going or carried on water" and refers to a sacred residence of the goddess Haumea, the site of a battle between Haumea and Kaulu, and also the site of a battle between warriors from Oʻahu and Maui. Construction began in 2025 and ongoing.
