= Keoneʻae station =

Honolulu Skyline station

Keoneʻae University of Hawaiʻi at West Oʻahu
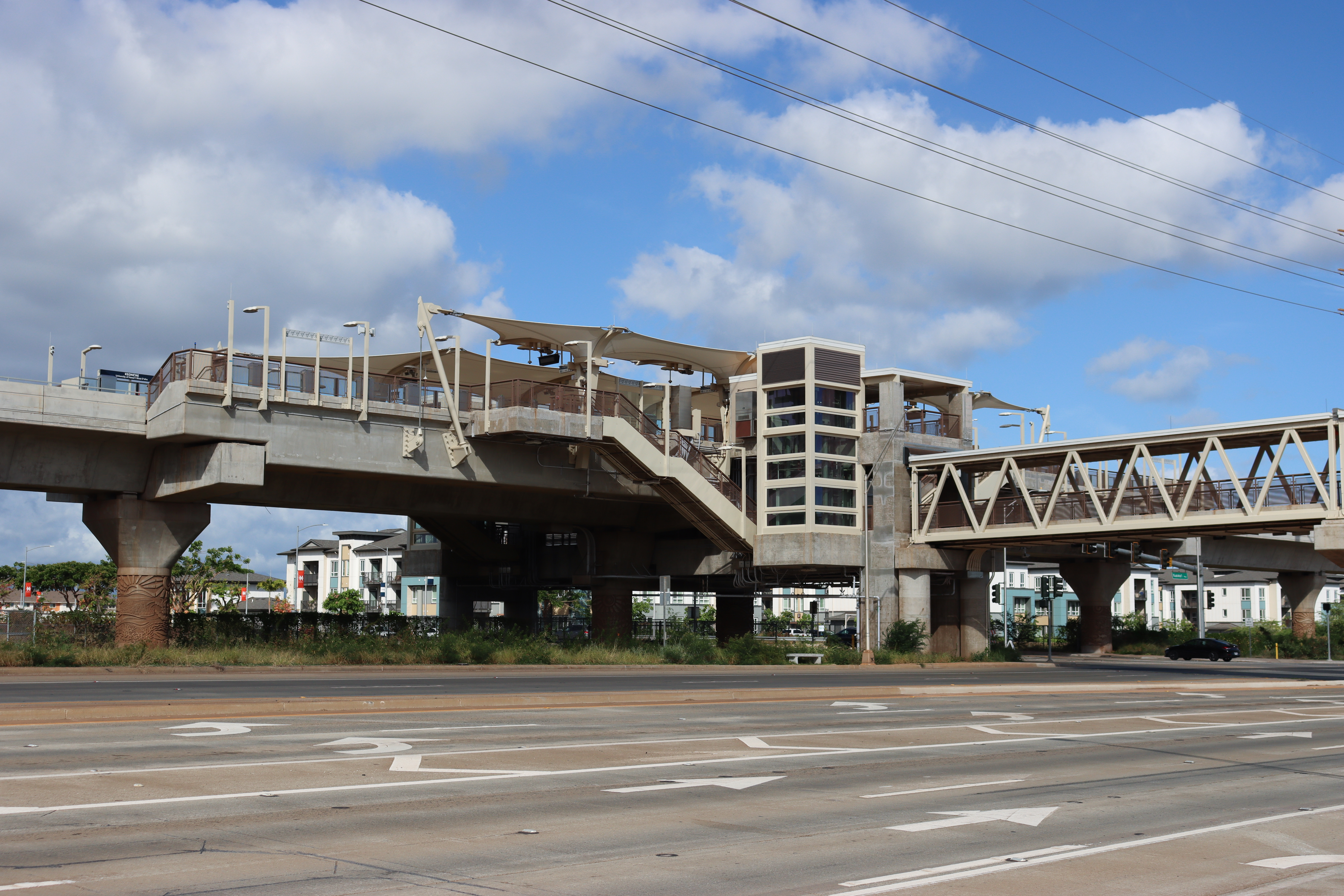
- Keoneʻae station building and pedestrian overpass as seen in July 2022

General information
- Location: 91-3590 Kualakaʻi Parkway; East Kapolei, Hawaiʻi
- Coordinates: 21°21′29″N 158°03′05″W
- Owner: Honolulu Department of Transportation Services
- Platforms: 2 side platforms
- Tracks: 2
- Connections: TheBus: C, 40, 44, 46, 47, 95, 99, 416, 461

Construction
- Structure type: Elevated
- Parking: 304 spaces
- Cycle facilities: Racks
- Accessible: Yes

History
- Opened: June 30, 2023; 3 years ago

Services
Preceding station	Skyline	Following station
Kualakaʻi Terminus	Skyline	Honouliuli toward Kahauiki
Location

Keoneʻae station (also known as University of Hawaiʻi at West Oʻahu station) is an elevated Skyline metro station in East Kapolei, Hawaiʻi, serving the nearby University of Hawaiʻi at West Oʻahu campus. The station is located alongside Kualakaʻi Parkway above its intersection with Hoomohala Avenue. The station opened on June 30, 2023 and includes a 304 space park and ride lot, with plans to offer up to 1,000 spaces at the site eventually.

In Hawaiian, "keoneʻae" means "fine, soft, powdery sand". The Hawaiian Station Name Working Group proposed Hawaiian names for the nine rail stations on the ʻEwa end of the rail system (stations west of and including Aloha Stadium) in November 2017, and HART adopted the proposed names on February 22, 2018.

== Service ==
Skyline trains run every 10 minutes. Service operates from 5 a.m. to 7 p.m. on weekdays and from 8 a.m. to 7 p.m. on weekends and holidays.

== Station information ==
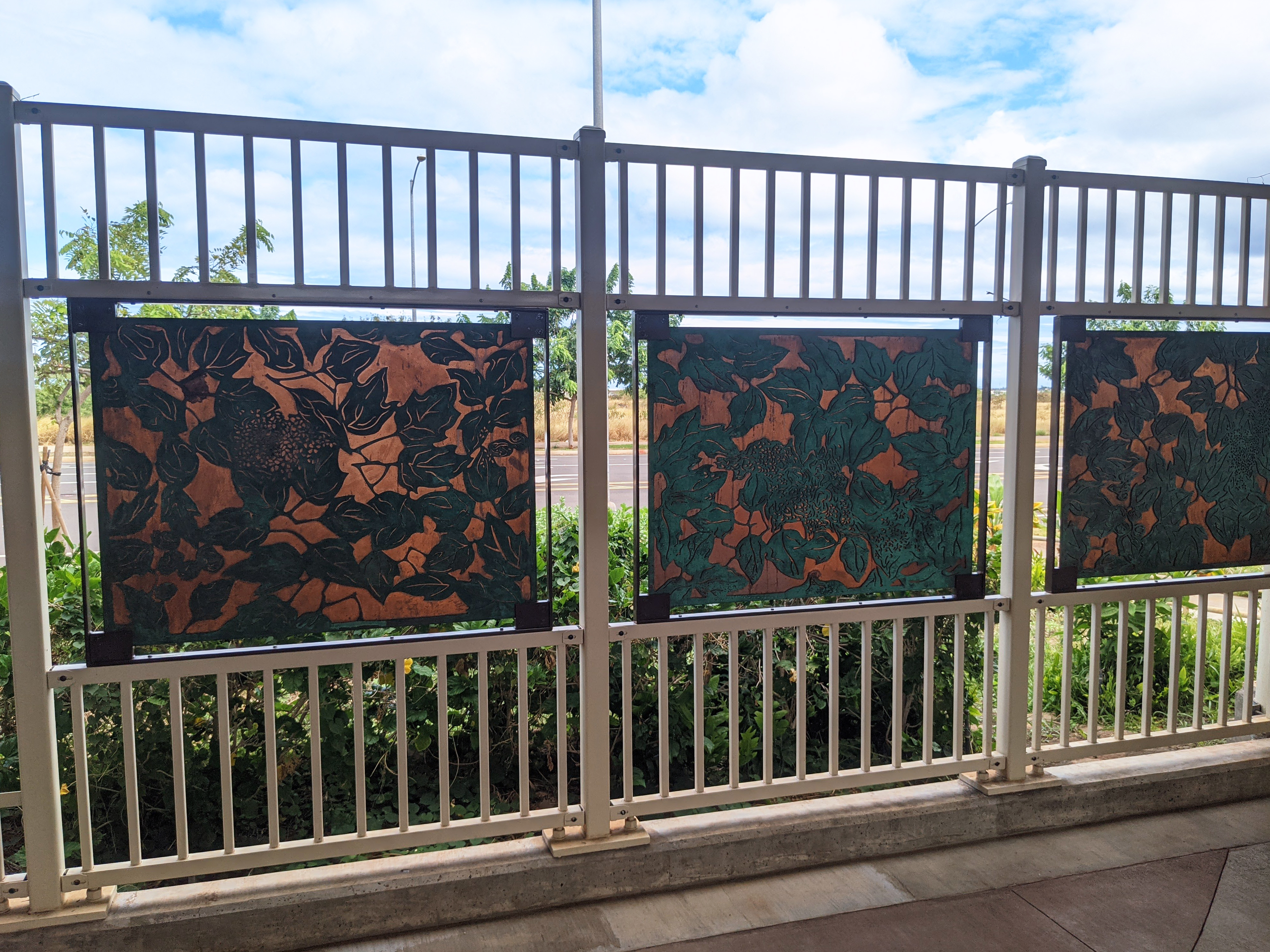
Kukui ʻĀ Mau I Ke Ao Mālamalama by Satoru Abe

When all 19 stations are open in 2031, Keoneʻae is projected to rank 18th in boardings at 2,440 per day.

After 2030, use is predicted to become considerably higher if long-term development plans for University of Hawaiʻi at West Oʻahu's "university village", the nearly Ho‘opili housing development, and 168 acres of nearby vacant state land are fully realized. The station's name refers to a historic farming village that existed historically at the intersection of Kaloʻi Gulch and Farrington Highway.

A larger 1,000-stall park and ride is slated to be developed in 2025 or eventually, along with a second entrance to the rail station.

Public art is present at the station via the Station Art Program. Etched copper metal panels are present at the station entrance, collectively titled Kukui ʻĀ Mau I Ke Ao Mālamalama (A Torch That Continues to Burn During the Day) by local artist Satoru Abe. The abstracted kukui (candlenut) motifs and scattered flora represent the University of Hawaiʻi's mission of "mālamalama," or "light of knowledge."

== Surrounding area ==
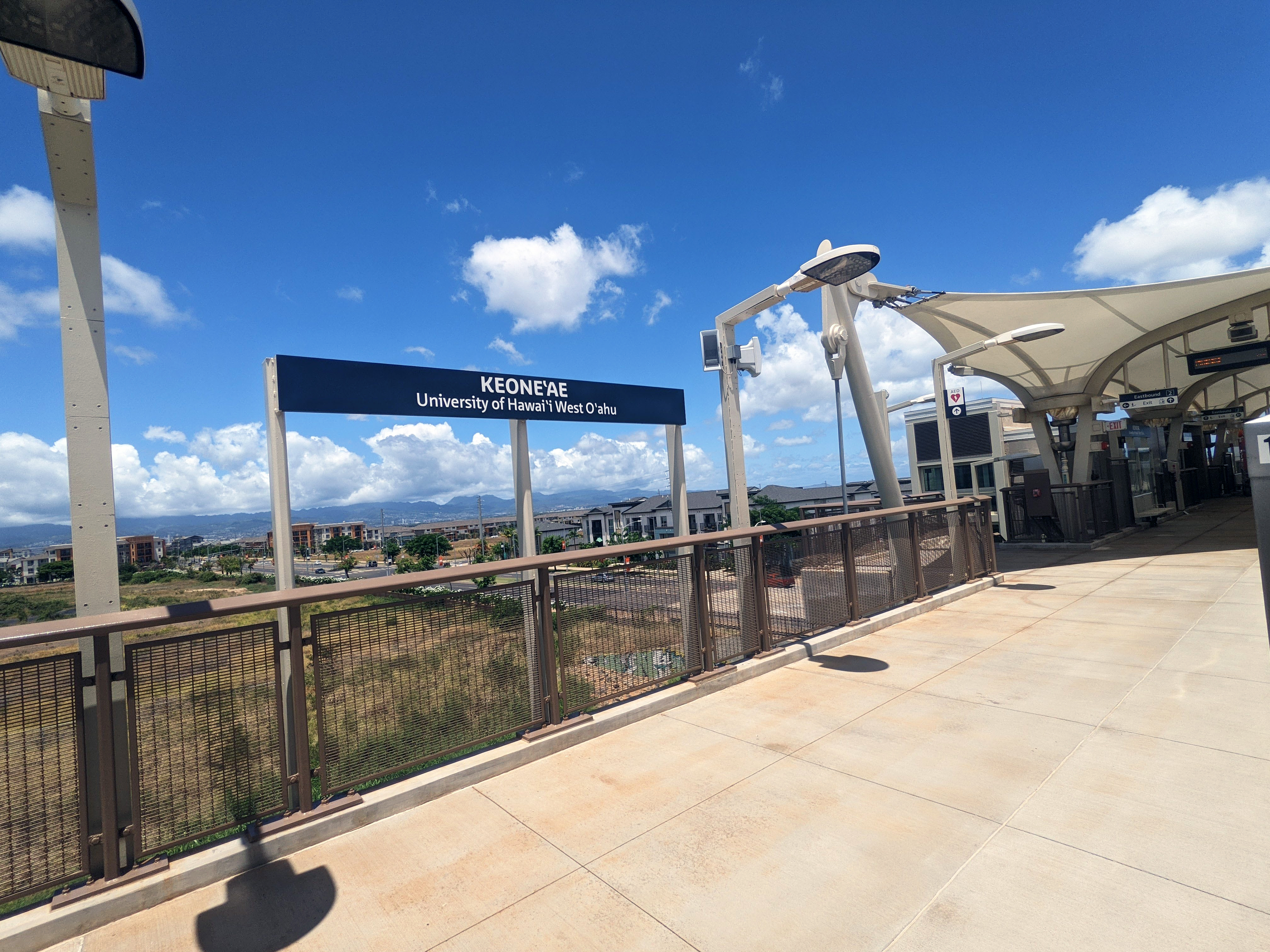
View from the station platform in June 2023

Keoneʻae station is located between Ho‘opili, a 11,750-home development, and the University of Hawaiʻi at West Oʻahu. Other existing homes near the station include a market-priced 318-unit rental apartment complex named The Element, a low-income 120-unit rental housing complex named Kulia, and for-sale mixed-use townhouses with ground-floor retail spaces.

The Hawai'i Department of Land and Natural Resources plans to build 1,000 homes, a hotel, retail space, a warehouse, and offices in the nearby vacant land by 2029, with continuing development through 2040, which is expected to create 2,390 long-term jobs via 1 million square feet of industrial buildings on 60 acres.
