= Kūwili station =

Future Honolulu Skyline station

Kūwili Iwilei

General information
- Location: Dillingham Boulevard & Ka‘a‘ahi Street; Honolulu, Hawaiʻi
- Coordinates: 21°19′03″N 157°52′00″W
- Owner: Honolulu Department of Transportation Services
- Platforms: 2 side platforms
- Tracks: 2

Construction
- Structure type: Elevated
- Accessible: Yes

History
- Opening: 2031; 5 years' time

Future services
Preceding station	Skyline	Following station
Niuhelewai toward Kualakaʻi	Skyline (Segment 3)	Hōlau toward Kaʻākaukukui
Location

Kūwili station (also known as Iwilei station) is a planned Skyline station in Honolulu, Hawaiʻi. It will be built as part of Segment 3 of the Skyline route, scheduled to open in 2031.

The Hawaiian Station Name Working Group proposed Hawaiian names for the twelve rail stations on the eastern end of the rail system (stations in the Airport and City Center segments) in April 2019. The name of this station, Kūwili, means "water swirling in place" and refers to a parcel of land in the Honolulu ahupuaʻa that contained a large fishpond watered by Leleo Stream. Construction began in 2025 and is ongoing.
