= Hōlau station =

Future Honolulu Skyline station

Hōlau Chinatown

General information
- Location: Nimitz Highway & Kekaulike Street; Honolulu, Hawaiʻi
- Coordinates: 21°18′45″N 157°51′55″W
- Owner: Honolulu Department of Transportation Services
- Platforms: 2 side platforms
- Tracks: 2

Construction
- Structure type: Elevated
- Accessible: Yes

History
- Opening: 2031; 5 years' time

Future services
Preceding station	Skyline	Following station
Kūwili toward Kualakaʻi	Skyline (Segment 3)	Kuloloia toward Kaʻākaukukui
Location

Hōlau station (also known as Chinatown station) is a planned Skyline station in Honolulu, Hawaiʻi. It will be built as part of Segment 3 of the Skyline route, scheduled to open in 2031.

The Hawaiian Station Name Working Group proposed Hawaiian names for the twelve rail stations on the eastern end of the rail system (stations in the Airport and City Center segments) in April 2019. The name of this station, Hōlau, means "many assembled" and is a modern name for a market. Construction began in 2025 and is ongoing.
