= Kūkuluaeʻo station =

Future Honolulu Skyline station

Kūkuluaeʻo Kakaʻako

General information
- Location: Halekauwila Street & Ward Avenue; Honolulu, Hawaiʻi
- Coordinates: 21°17′47″N 157°51′19″W
- Owner: Honolulu Department of Transportation Services
- Platforms: 2 side platforms
- Tracks: 2

Construction
- Structure type: Elevated
- Accessible: Yes

Future services
Preceding station	Skyline	Following station
Kaʻākaukukui toward Kualakaʻi	Skyline (Planned)	Kālia Terminus
Location

Kūkuluaeʻo station (also known as Kakaʻako station) is a planned Skyline station in Honolulu, Hawaiʻi. The station was included in the original plan for Skyline but had to be eliminated from the initial segments of construction due to a severe funding shortfall. Despite the deferral of construction of this station, the Honolulu Authority for Rapid Transportation says it remains committed to completing this station in a subsequent segment of the project. It is estimated to be completed in 2033.

The Hawaiian Station Name Working Group proposed Hawaiian names for the twelve rail stations on the eastern end of the rail system (stations in the Airport and City Center segments) in April 2019. The name of this station, Kūkuluāeʻo, means "the Hawaiian stilt" and refers to a place famed in ancient times near Kākāʻako which was known for salt making.
