= Kuloloia station =

Future Honolulu Skyline station

Kuloloia Downtown

General information
- Location: Nimitz Highway & Bishop Street; Honolulu, Hawaiʻi
- Coordinates: 21°18′24″N 157°51′49″W
- Owner: Honolulu Department of Transportation Services
- Platforms: 2 side platforms
- Tracks: 2

Construction
- Structure type: Elevated
- Accessible: Yes

History
- Opening: 2031; 5 years' time

Future services
| Preceding station | Skyline | Following station |
|---|---|---|
| Hōlau toward Kualakaʻi | Skyline (Segment 3) | Kaʻākaukukui Terminus |
Location

Kuloloia station (also known as Downtown station) is a planned Skyline station in Honolulu, Hawaiʻi. It will be built as part of Segment 3 of the Skyline route, scheduled to open in 2031.

The Hawaiian Station Name Working Group proposed Hawaiian names for the twelve rail stations on the eastern end of the rail system (stations in the Airport and City Center segments) in April 2019. The name of this station, Kuloloia, is an ancient place name and refers to a sandy beach on the shore of Kou, a favored residence of the chiefess Nāmahana. Construction is ongoing as of 2025.
