= Kālia station =

Future Honolulu Skyline station

Kālia Ala Moana Center

General information
- Location: Kona Street & Kona Iki Street; Honolulu, Hawaiʻi
- Coordinates: 21°17′33″N 157°50′37″W
- Owner: Honolulu Department of Transportation Services
- Platforms: 1 island platform
- Tracks: 2

Construction
- Structure type: Elevated
- Accessible: Yes

Future services
Preceding station	Skyline	Following station
Kūkuluaeʻo toward Kualakaʻi	Skyline (Planned)	Terminus
Location

Kālia station (also known as Ala Moana Center station) is a planned and final Skyline station in Honolulu, Hawaiʻi. It will be located near the Ala Moana Center, a major shopping mall and the location of the city's largest bus transit center. The station was included in the original plan for Skyline but had to be eliminated from the initial segments of construction due to a severe funding shortfall. Despite the deferral of construction of this station, the Honolulu Authority for Rapid Transportation says it remains committed to completing this station in a subsequent segment of the project. It is estimated to be completed in 2033.

The Hawaiian Station Name Working Group proposed Hawaiian names for the twelve rail stations on the eastern end of the rail system (stations in the Airport and City Center segments) in April 2019. The name of this station, Kālia, means "waited for" and refers to an ʻili near the Waikīkī coast used for salt production and fishponds.
