= West Loch Estate, Hawaii =

Census-designated place in Hawaii, United States

West Loch Estate
- Census-designated place
- Location within Oahu Location within Hawaii
- Coordinates: 21°21′40″N 158°1′28″W
- Country: United States
- State: Hawaii

Area
  - Total: 0.66 sq mi (1.72 km^{2})
  - Land: 0.66 sq mi (1.71 km^{2})
  - Water: 0.0039 sq mi (0.01 km^{2})
- Elevation: 10 ft (3.0 m)

Population (2020)
  - Total: 5,523
  - Density: 8,378/sq mi (3,234.8/km^{2})
- Time zone: UTC-10 (Hawaii-Aleutian)
- Area code: 808
- FIPS code: 15-80470

West Loch Estate is a census-designated place (CDP) in Honolulu County, Hawaiʻi, United States. The population was 5,523 at the 2020 census.

== Geography ==
According to the United States Census Bureau, the CDP has a total area of 1.6 square miles (4.1 km^{2}), all of it land.

It is on the western shore of the West Loch of Pearl Harbor. Fort Weaver Road (Hawaii Route 76) is the main road, running north–south through the CDP.

== Demographics ==
Historical population
Census	Pop.	Note	%±
2020	5,523		—
U.S. Decennial Census

=== 2020 census ===
As of the 2020 census, West Loch Estate had a population of 5,523. The median age was 42.5 years. 19.9% of residents were under the age of 18 and 19.4% of residents were 65 years of age or older. For every 100 females there were 98.4 males, and for every 100 females age 18 and over there were 95.1 males age 18 and over.

100.0% of residents lived in urban areas, while 0.0% lived in rural areas.

There were 1,621 households in West Loch Estate, of which 37.4% had children under the age of 18 living in them. Of all households, 62.4% were married-couple households, 12.0% were households with a male householder and no spouse or partner present, and 19.6% were households with a female householder and no spouse or partner present. About 14.4% of all households were made up of individuals and 9.0% had someone living alone who was 65 years of age or older.

There were 1,665 housing units, of which 2.6% were vacant. The homeowner vacancy rate was 0.8% and the rental vacancy rate was 3.2%.

Racial composition as of the 2020 census
Race	Number	Percent
White	559	10.1%
Black or African American	78	1.4%
American Indian and Alaska Native	13	0.2%
Asian	3,126	56.6%
Native Hawaiian and Other Pacific Islander	362	6.6%
Some other race	72	1.3%
Two or more races	1,313	23.8%
Hispanic or Latino (of any race)	529	9.6%
