= East Kapolei, Hawaii =

- Census-designated place
- Location within Oahu Location within Hawaii
- Coordinates: 21°21′43″N 158°2′43″W
- Country: United States
- State: Hawaii
- County: Honolulu

Area
  - Total: 3.64 sq mi (9.44 km^{2})
  - Land: 3.64 sq mi (9.44 km^{2})
  - Water: 0 sq mi (0.00 km^{2})
- Elevation: 130 ft (40 m)

Population (2020)
  - Total: 5,299
  - Density: 1,453.1/sq mi (561.05/km^{2})
- Time zone: UTC-10 (Hawaii–Aleutian Time Zone)
- ZIP Code: 96706 (Ewa Beach)
- Area code: 808
- FIPS code: 15-06300
- GNIS feature ID: 2806909

East Kapolei is a census-designated place (CDP) in Honolulu County, Hawaii, United States. It is on the south side of the island of Oahu and is bordered to the west by Kapolei, to the south by Ewa Villages, to the east by West Loch Estate, and to the north by Interstate H-1. By road it is 17 miles (27 km) northwest of downtown Honolulu. As of the 2020 census, East Kapolei had a population of 5,299.

East Kapolei was first listed as a CDP prior to the 2020 census.

== Demographics ==
Historical population
Census	Pop.	Note	%±
2020	5,299		—
U.S. Decennial Census

=== 2020 census ===
As of the 2020 census, East Kapolei had a population of 5,299. The median age was 28.1 years. 35.9% of residents were under the age of 18 and 4.8% of residents were 65 years of age or older. For every 100 females there were 95.2 males, and for every 100 females age 18 and over there were 89.7 males age 18 and over.

98.8% of residents lived in urban areas, while 1.2% lived in rural areas.

There were 1,517 households in East Kapolei, of which 59.8% had children under the age of 18 living in them. Of all households, 53.8% were married-couple households, 13.2% were households with a male householder and no spouse or partner present, and 20.9% were households with a female householder and no spouse or partner present. About 10.8% of all households were made up of individuals and 2.0% had someone living alone who was 65 years of age or older.

There were 1,623 housing units, of which 6.5% were vacant. The homeowner vacancy rate was 0.1% and the rental vacancy rate was 6.8%.

Racial composition as of the 2020 census
Race	Number	Percent
White	424	8.0%
Black or African American	112	2.1%
American Indian and Alaska Native	4	0.1%
Asian	1,570	29.6%
Native Hawaiian and Other Pacific Islander	922	17.4%
Some other race	56	1.1%
Two or more races	2,211	41.7%
Hispanic or Latino (of any race)	729	13.8%
