= Kaʻākaukukui station =

Future Honolulu Skyline station

Kaʻākaukukui Civic Center

General information
- Location: Halekauwila Street & South Street; Honolulu, Hawaiʻi
- Coordinates: 21°18′05″N 157°51′34″W
- Owner: Honolulu Department of Transportation Services
- Platforms: 2 side platforms
- Tracks: 2

Construction
- Structure type: Elevated
- Accessible: Yes

History
- Opening: 2031; 5 years' time

Future services
Preceding station	Skyline	Following station
Kuloloia toward Kualakaʻi	Skyline (Segment 3)	Terminus
Kuloloia toward Kualakaʻi	Skyline (Planned)	Kūkuluaeʻo toward Kālia
Location

Kaʻākaukukui station (also known as Civic Center station) is a planned Skyline station in the Our Kakaʻako district in Honolulu, Hawaiʻi. It will be built as part of Segment 3 of the Skyline route, scheduled to open in 2031.

The Hawaiian Station Name Working Group proposed Hawaiian names for the twelve rail stations on the eastern end of the rail system (stations in the Airport and City Center segments) in April 2019. The name of this station, Kaʻākaukukui, means "the north/right light" and refers to coastal lands east of Waikahalulu, bordering Kukuluʻāeʻo. Construction is ongoing as of 2025.
