= Waikīkī Aquarium =

Aquarium in Honolulu, Hawaii

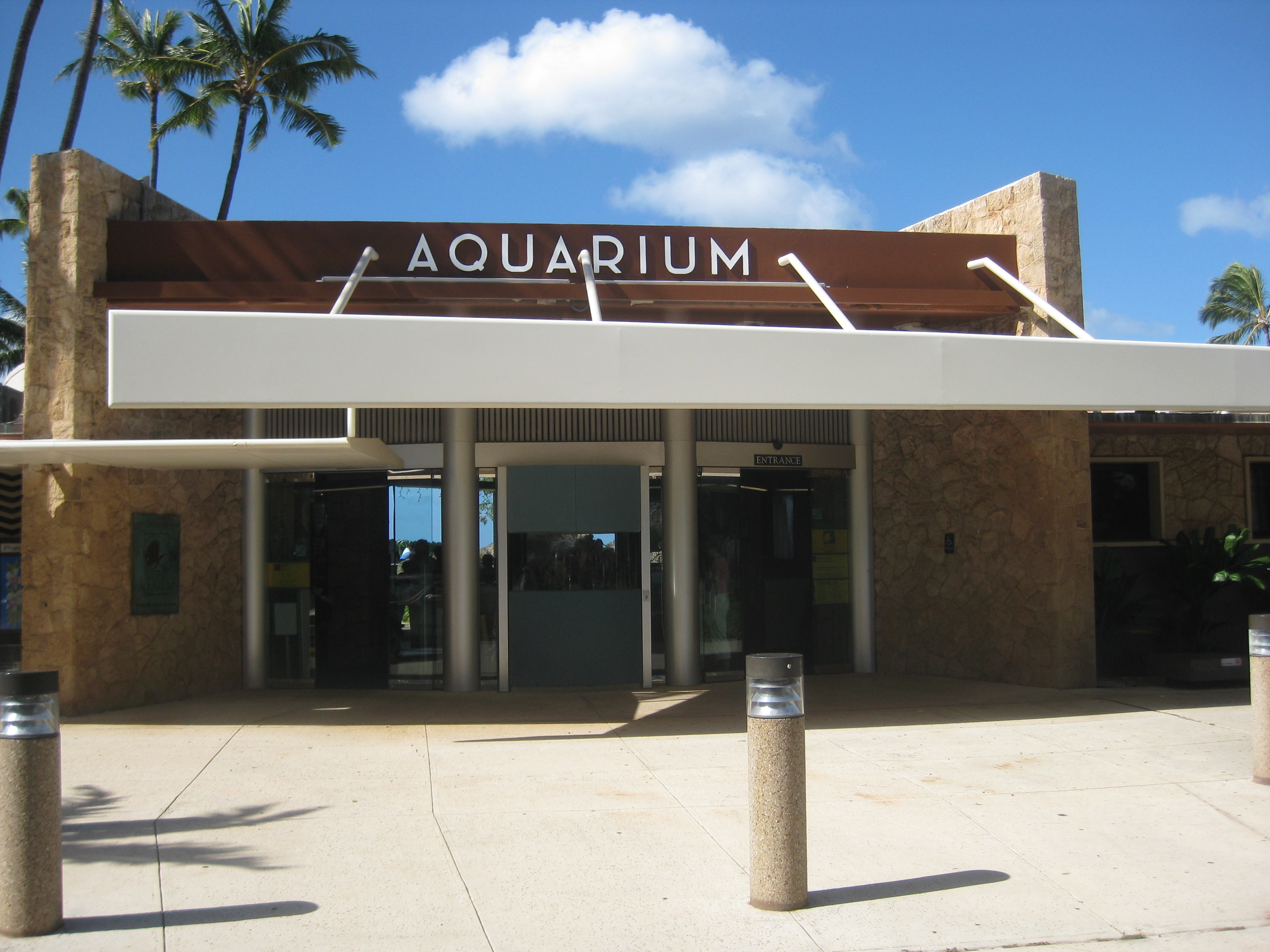
- Waikīkī Aquarium entrance
- Interactive map of Waikīkī Aquarium
- 21.2659°N 157.8220°W
- Date opened: March 19, 1904
- Location: Honolulu, Hawaii, United States
- Website: www.waikikiaquarium.org

The Waikīkī Aquarium is an aquarium in Honolulu, Hawaii, United States. It was founded in 1904 and has been an institution of the University of Hawaiʻi at Mānoa since 1919. The aquarium is the second-oldest still-operating public aquarium in the United States, after the New York Aquarium.

Built next to a living coral reef on the Waikīkī shoreline, the Waikīkī Aquarium is home to more than 3,500 organisms of 490 species of marine plants and animals. Each year, over 330,000 people visit, and over 30,000 schoolchildren participate in the aquarium's education activities and programs. The Waikīkī Aquarium was designated a Coastal Ecosystem Learning Center of the Coastal America Partnership federal program.

== Establishment ==
The Waikīkī Aquarium was established on March 19, 1904, by the Honolulu Rapid Transit and Land Company, a forerunner of the present-day TheBus. Then known as the Honolulu Aquarium, its purpose was to entice travelers to ride the trolley all the way to the end of the line at Queen Kapiʻolani Park. It was built on land donated by James Bicknell Castle with funds from Charles Montague Cooke and his wife Anna Rice Cooke. In 1955, the Aquarium moved to its present location, a 2.35-acre parcel of land two hundred yards south of the original site, and changed its name to Waikīkī Aquarium.

The aquarium opened in 1904 with 35 tanks and 400 marine organisms, and during its first year, biologist David Starr Jordan proclaimed it as having the finest collection of fishes in the world. Considered state-of-the-art at that time, the aquarium also received positive comments from such notable visitors of that era as William Jennings Bryan and Jack London.

The Aquarium has had five directors. Frederick A. Potter, a clerk for the Honolulu Rapid Transit Company, was transferred to manage the Aquarium, becoming the first director in 1904. Despite his lack of formal training in marine sciences, Potter was a vigorous supporter of Hawaiian ichthyology, and served as director until May 1940. Potter's Angelfish (Centropyge potteri), was named in his honor.

In 1940, Spencer Tinker was appointed the second director of the Aquarium, after serving on the faculty of the University of Hawaii Zoology Department. Tinker was well known for his books on Hawaiian fishes, Pacific crustaceans, and other marine life: his book Hawaiian Fishes remains a classic. Tinker's Butterflyfish, Chaetodon tinkeri, was named after him. Tinker retired in 1973. The Hawaiian butterflyfish is named Chaetodon tinkeri in honor of Spencer Tinker, who became the aquarium's second director in 1940.

During those early years (1919–1973) admissions to the Aquarium were deposited to the State General Fund and did not return to the Aquarium for upkeep. This lack of investment resulted in the Aquarium falling into disrepair and it was in urgent need of a new purpose and vision. In 1975, Leighton Taylor was appointed the third director. An ichthyologist by training, and an expert on sharks, Taylor understood the need for a new Aquarium vision committed to education, conservation and research, and he realized the need to diversify revenue sources. The logo, Education Department, Volunteer Program, library, research facility, gift shop, Friends of the Waikīkī Aquarium support organization, the first Exhibits Master Plan (1978), and accreditation by the Association of Zoos and Aquariums (AZA) all happened during his tenure. By accepting donations, memberships and grants, the Aquarium was able to fund increased services and to renovate exhibits. Taylor's goby, Trimma taylori, is named in his honor.

In 1990, Bruce Carlson was appointed the fourth director, a post he had held in an interim capacity since the departure of Taylor in 1986. Carlson had previously worked closely with Taylor and others to design new and more naturalistic exhibits that focused on the marine life of Hawaii and the western Pacific. Carlson developed a set of clearly defined goals and strategic plans, and initiated the coral propagation program. From 1992 to 1994, Carlson oversaw the aquarium's most extensive renovation since 1955. The $3.2 million investment from the Legislature enhanced the Aquarium's mission of research, education and conservation through greatly improved exhibits and visitor facilities. In 2000 the Aquarium was designated a Coastal Ecosystem Learning Center of the Coastal America partnership. Four reef animals are named after him: the damselfish Paraglyphidodon carlsoni, the anthias fish Pseudanthias carlsoni, and two nudibranchs Halgerda carlsoni and Ardeadoris carlsoni.

In April 2004, Andrew Rossiter was appointed the fifth director, joining the Aquarium at the onset of its 100th anniversary celebrations. His long-term ambition at the Aquarium is to increase public awareness of the ecology and conservation of marine life and reef habitats through aquarium exhibitory, research and education. His goal is to consolidate and build upon the existing exhibitory expertise and the solid foundation laid down by his two predecessors, and to modernize, diversify and expand the aquarium's facilities through a program of gradual renewal, renovation and replacement.

== Development and conditions ==
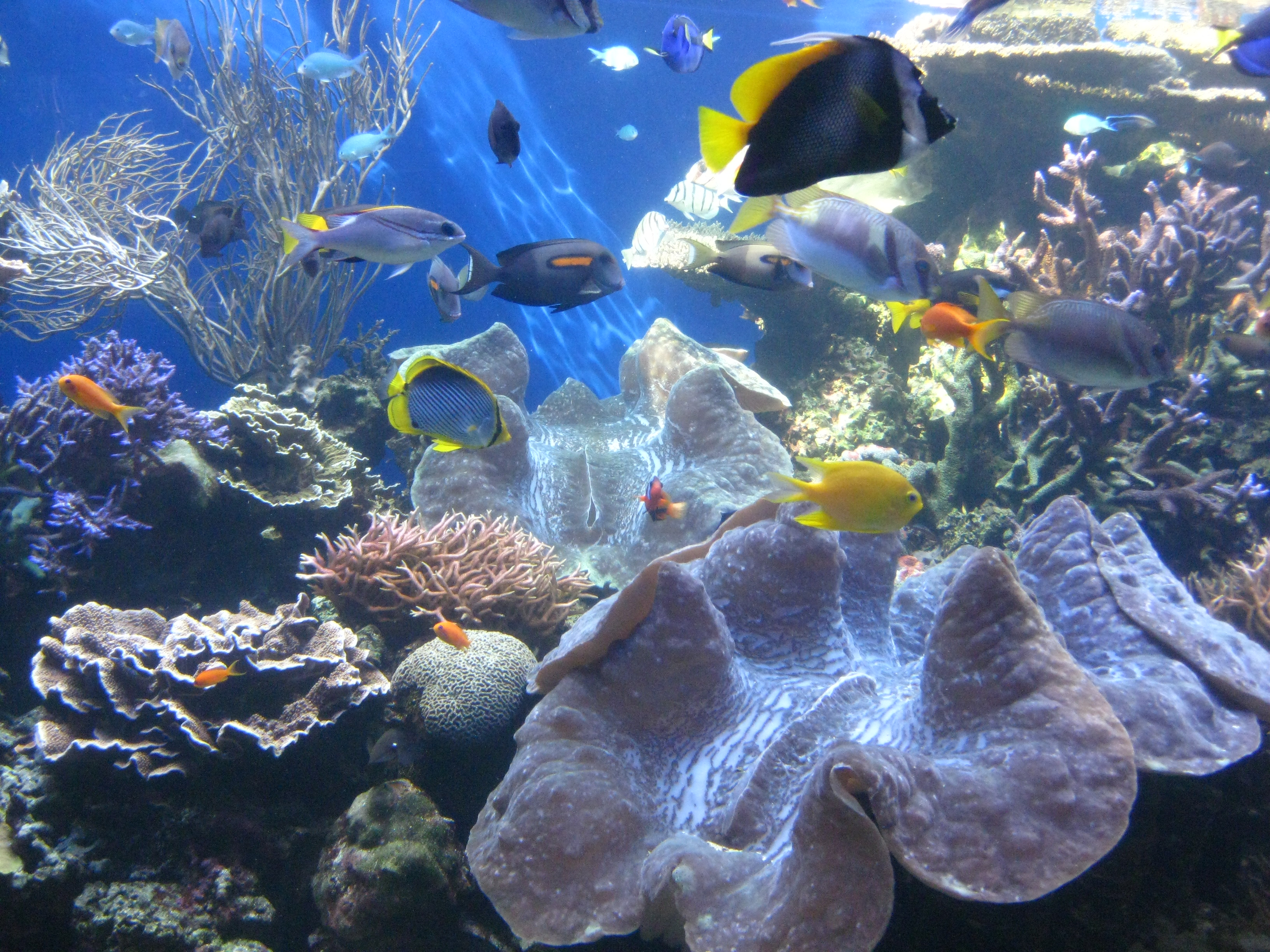
Coral reef exhibit at Waikīkī Aquarium

The Waikīkī Aquarium developed the first displays of living Pacific corals in the United States in 1978 using water from a seawater well and natural sunlight. A special surge device was developed later to allow culture of staghorn and table corals (Acropora spp.). Some of the corals at the Waikīkī Aquarium are over 30 years old.

The Waikīkī Aquarium was the second aquarium in the world, and the first in the United States, to maintain the chambered nautilus (Nouméa Aquarium was first) and the first in the world to produce viable Nautilus embryos.

Other "firsts" for the Waikīkī Aquarium were displays of the blacktip reef sharks (Carcharhinus melanopterus) ca. 1957; broadclub cuttlefish (Sepia latimanus) in 1978; a mahimahi hatchery and exhibit (Coryphaena hippurus) in 1991; and the giant clam (Tridacna gigas) in 1979. The largest giant clam at the Waikīkī Aquarium was acquired from the Micronesian Mariculture Demonstration Center in Palau in June 1982 and was estimated to be five-years old at that time. At 38 years old in 2016, it is the longest-lived giant clam in any aquarium in the world.

The Waikīkī Aquarium has won national awards for its exhibits and aquatic culture methods: Association of Zoos and Aquariums (AZA) Bean Award for Nautilus propagation (1991); AZA/Munson Conservation Award for "Corals are Alive" exhibition (1999); AZA/Munson Conservation Exhibit Award (2003); and the AZA Bean Award for the "South Pacific Habitat" exhibition (2003).

== Art ==
Art at the Waikīkī Aquarium includes:

- "Tropical Sounds" (2000), a group of abstract ceramic sculptures by Jun Kaneko
- Vita Marinae, a 1975 ceramic tile waterscape by Claude Horan

== See also ==
- Kapiolani Park
- Kuhio Beach Park
