= Libow =

Libow may refer to:

- Leslie S. Libow (1933–), US medical doctor
- Liepāja, Latvia; formerly known as Либау (Libau; Russian) and Libow (English)
