= The New Jewish Home =

Healthcare organization in New York, U.S.

- Formation: November 21, 1848; 177 years ago in New York, NY, U.S.A.
- Founder: Hannah Leo
- Founded at: New York, NY
- Type: Nonprofit
- Headquarters: New York City
- Services: Health care; Eldercare
- CEO: Jeffrey I. Farber, MD
- Staff: 2,500 (2018)
- Website: jewishhome.org
- Formerly called: List: B'nai Jeshurun Ladies' Benevolent Society for the Relief of Indigent Females (1848–1870); Home for Aged and Infirm Hebrews (1870–1963); Jewish Home and Hospital for the Aged (1963–2002); Jewish Home and Hospital Lifecare System (2002–2008); Jewish Home Lifecare (2008–2015)

The New Jewish Home (formerly Jewish Home Lifecare among other prior names) is an American nonprofit older adult health care system based in New York City. The organization serves older adults of all religions and ethnicities at its three campuses in Manhattan, The Bronx, and Mamaroneck in Westchester County. It provides rehabilitative services, skilled nursing, senior housing, and numerous home health programs, including a certified home health agency and a home care agency. The organization was founded in 1848 by Hannah Leo of the B'nai Jeshurun Ladies' Benevolent Society.

== History ==
=== 1848–1878: Foundation and the establishment of first home ===
Hannah Leo and other women of the B'nai Jeshurun congregation founded the B'nai Jeshurun Ladies' Benevolent Society for the Relief of Indigent Females on November 21, 1848. In its early years, the society struggled to accumulate funds for its philanthropic endeavors. Through various fundraising efforts, the society had accrued around $5,000 by the late 1860s. The organization was officially incorporated on March 13, 1866. On May 24, 1870, it opened a home for elderly women in a ten-room house it had rented at 215 West 17th Street in Manhattan. The home, also referred to as the Home for Aged and Infirm Hebrews, initially housed four to seven women. It was one of the first nursing homes or eldercare facilities of its kind. Founder Hannah Leo passed soon after the home opened, but her son, Simeon N. Leo, served as attending physician for many years.

In 1872, the organization was re-incorporated as the Home for Aged and Infirm Hebrews. In March 1872, the home was moved to a building on West 32nd Street and served 14 women at that time. Accommodations proved inadequate there, and, in May 1873, the home was moved to a 5-story building on the corner of Lexington Avenue and 63rd Street that was capable of housing 50 individuals. At the time, the home housed 28 women and 6 men, all of whom were elderly or ill. In 1875 or 1876, the institution acquired a mansion at Avenue A and 86th Street that had previously been used as an eldercare facility.

=== 1879–1922: Moving to main campus and subsequent growth ===
In 1879, administrators began coordinating with the B'nai B'rith service organization about the prospect of finding a plot of land to build a new facility. The two organizations agreed to a partnership to build a new home in January 1880. Later that year, 8 adjoining lots on 105th and 106th Streets in Manhattan were purchased. The cornerstone on the new building was laid in May 1882, and it was completed in 1883 at a cost of $200,000, much of which was paid via donations. Nine more adjoining lots were later purchased. The construction of an annex on that land was completed in November 1889. The apartments in the annex were reserved for the most ill residents. Another adjoining property was purchased in 1894, and construction of a new wing began in 1895. At that time, the home had 163 residents.

The new wing and a general expansion of the facility were completed in 1896, increasing the capacity to 300 residents. In 1902, the association had paid off all debts, and around 220 people were living at the facility. A 4-story extension to the campus was approved in 1907. Since its founding in 1917, the Federation of Jewish Philanthropies of New York (now, the UJA-Federation of New York), has continually supported the work of the home. A few years later in 1920, the home celebrated its 50th anniversary. At the time, Dr. Simeon N. Leo was still the attending physician and surgeon, and the facility housed 350 residents. In 1921 Dr. Frederic D. Zeman, a Mount Sinai physician, developed the first patient-centered model of care at Jewish Home, where he also served as Medical Director for 45 years. In January 1922, a 4-story addition that could house up to 75 new individuals was completed.

=== 1922–1987: Hospital accreditation and continued expansion ===
After Dr. Simeon N. Leo's death in the 1920s, the facility added full-time medical staff. In the 1940s, the organization received accreditation as a hospital from the Joint Commission and was one of the only geriatric hospitals of its kind in the United States. To address the shortage of institutional care for the aged, in 1948 Jewish Home became the country's first organization to provide home care for older adults helping them remain in their own homes for as long as possible.

In June 1950, the Kingsbridge House annex located at Kingsbridge Road and University Avenue in the Bronx was completed at a site that was once the Hebrew Infant Asylum. The six-building facility was capable of housing around 100 individuals (all of whom could receive care from their own private doctors) and cost roughly $3 million to build. That amount was largely paid by the Federation of Jewish Philanthropies of New York (now, the UJA-Federation of New York). Upon the completion of the annex, the home became the "largest nonprofit voluntary agency serving the needs of older persons in the U.S."

Around 1964, the home changed its name to the Jewish Home and Hospital for Aged. A new facility—called the Friedman Building after former trustees Sol and Amelia G. Friedman—was completed on West 106th Street in November 1967. The 8-story building featured an auditorium, physical medicine and recreational therapy departments, club rooms, a synagogue, and conference and teaching rooms, among others. In 1970, a modern senior housing facility called "Kittay House" (now, Kittay Senior Apartments) was opened on Webb Avenue in the Bronx. These apartments, which are Mitchell-Lama independent living residences, did not have 24-hour nursing care, but emergency medical help was available as needed.

In September 1972, a new addition to the Jewish Home was completed. The Greenwall Pavilion—named after philanthropist Frank Greenwall—was capable of housing 320 additional residents and cost $12 million to complete. By 1979, the Jewish Home was caring for over 1,800 elderly people. In 1983, under the direction of Leslie S. Libow (professor of geriatrics at the Mount Sinai School of Medicine and the medical director at the Jewish Home), the country's first geriatric fellowship program was established. The program with Mount Sinai Hospital allowed doctors to conduct joint research and to teach and train as geriatric specialists. In 1987, the Kingsbridge facility in the Bronx developed a program for aiding blind and vision-impaired individuals.

=== 1988–present: Modernization and relocation attempts ===
In 1991, the Sarah R. Neuman Nursing Home in Mamaroneck, New York was purchased by the Jewish Home and Hospital for Aged. In 1997, the Jewish Home's Bronx campus at Kingsbridge Road and University Avenue underwent a major expansion with support from the Dormitory Authority of the State of New York and a donation from the Harry and Jeannette Weinberg Foundation of Baltimore. In the same year, Jewish Home launched a Managed Term Care (MLTC) plan, pre-PACE program (Program of All-Inclusive Care for the Elderly) with the support of Mount Sinai Hospital and the Metropolitan Council on Jewish Poverty. The entity later became Senior Health Partners.

In the early 2000s, the organization's name was changed to the Jewish Home and Hospital Lifecare System. In 2005, the Kenneth Gladstone Building, the second low-income senior housing facility constructed by the organization after the Riverdale House, was completed on University Avenue in the Bronx. In 2006, to address the growing shortage of health care workers, Jewish Home established its Geriatrics Career Development (GCD) program. The donor supported program trains students ages 14 to 24, from “under-resourced high schools”. As early as 2007, there was a plan to demolish two buildings on the main campus in Manhattan and replace them with towers that would feature an increase in private suites, bathrooms, and kitchens. Around 2008, the name of the network was changed again to Jewish Home Lifecare.

In June 2010, another affordable senior housing residence, Weinberg Gardens, was completed on Webb Avenue in the Bronx (near Kittay Senior Apartments, Riverdale House, and the Gladstone Building), making it the third Housing and Urban Development Section 202 supportive housing building for older adults. A 72-unit assisted living residence (dubbed the "University Avenue Assisted Living Program") was opened in the Bronx in 2013. The facility provides affordable housing and care to New York state residents age 62 or older.

A new plan to relocate the Manhattan campus to a plot on West 100th Street was unveiled in 2011. The plan called for a 24-story building to be built using the "Green House" model founded on "person-directed care" with apartment-like accommodations and shared living spaces. An amended plan that called for a similar 20-story building on West 97th Street was approved by the New York Public Health and Health Planning Council's Committee on Establishment and Project Review in 2012. Legal issues delayed construction of The New Jewish Home's Manhattan campus on 97th Street. In December 2015, The New York State Court of Appeals upheld the Appellate Division of The New York State Supreme Court's decision in favor of The New Jewish Home on a challenge to the environmental impact study of the 97th street site conducted by the Department of Health. In a separate case in October 2018, however, the Appellate Division of the New York State Supreme Court revoked The New Jewish Home's building permit for the 97th street site due to zoning issues. The court's unprecedented ruling overturned key decisions by two New York City agencies – the NYC Department of Buildings and the Board of Standards and Appeals.

In the fall of 2016, Jewish Home sold its skilled nursing facility at its University Heights campus in the Bronx to SentosaCare. In June 2017, the organization signed a 20-year lease for modern office space at 1200 Waters Place in the Bronx adjacent to the Montefiore Hutchinson campus. The goal of that facility is to consolidate the Jewish Home's Adult Day Health Care programs that resided at the Sarah Neuman Nursing Home in Westchester and its Kingsbridge facility in the Bronx. In December 2017, Jeffrey I. Farber took over as President and CEO, replacing Audrey Weiner who had been CEO for over 15 years. In October 2018, the state Supreme Court's Appellate Division overruled the city's Department of Buildings and the Board of Standards and Appeals which had granted permits to The New Jewish Home to build its facility on West 97th Street.

== Operations ==
The New Jewish Home operates across three campuses: a skilled nursing facility, short-term rehab, and Adult Day Program in Manhattan; Kittay Senior Apartments and independent and assisted living programs in the Kingsbridge section of the Bronx; the Sarah Neuman Skilled Nursing Facility and Short-Stay Rehab facility in Westchester County; and an Adult Day Health Care facility off the Hutchinson River Parkway in the Bronx. The organization provides rehabilitative services, including a substance abuse rehabilitation program, the first program to offer short-stay rehab patients substance abuse recovery services. It also offers skilled nursing, independent and low-income senior housing, long-term nursing and home care, adult day health care programs, and other home care programs throughout the New York metro area. The organization serves over 10,000 older adults at its facilities and in patient homes annually.
