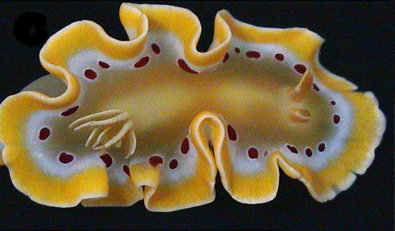
- Ardeadoris cruenta

Scientific classification
- Kingdom: Animalia
- Phylum: Mollusca
- Class: Gastropoda
- Order: Nudibranchia
- Family: Chromodorididae
- Genus: Ardeadoris
- Species: A. cruenta

Binomial name
- Ardeadoris cruenta (Rudman, 1986)

Synonyms
- Glossodoris cruenta Rudman, 1986 (basionym)

= Ardeadoris cruenta =

Species of gastropod

Ardeadoris cruenta is a species of very colourful sea slug, a dorid nudibranch, a marine gastropod mollusc in the family Chromodorididae. Its name is derived from the feminine form of the Latin word cruentus, which means "stained with blood" and is a reference to the red spots on its upper dorsum. It was transferred to the genus Ardeadoris on the basis of DNA evidence.

== Distribution ==
This species was described from Osprey Island, Great Barrier Reef, Australia, in the tropical Western Pacific Ocean. It has also been recorded from the Philippines, the Lembeh Strait in northern Sulawesi, East Timor and the Solomon Islands. This species of nudibranch is not common.

== Description ==
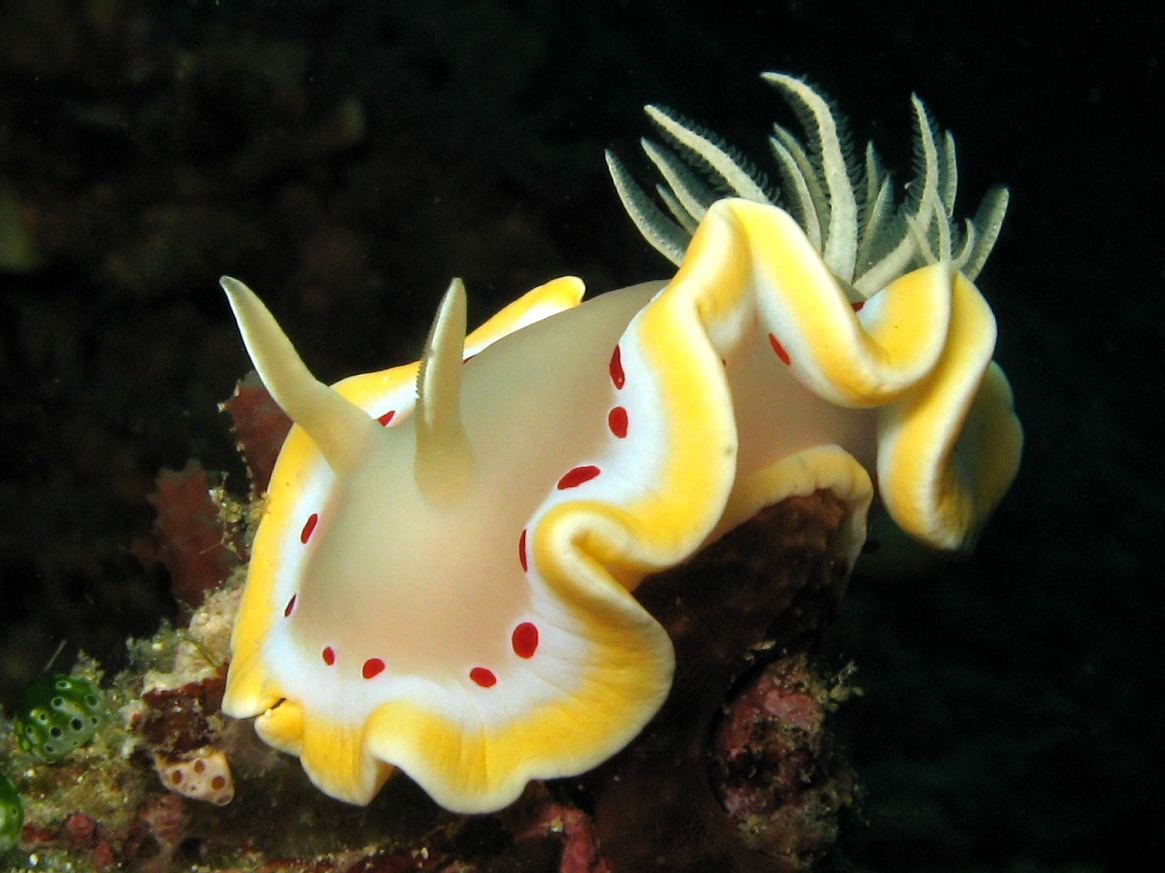
Ardeadoris cruenta, head towards the camera

Ardeadoris cruenta has a pale-lemon colored body with a bright yellow and white lined frilly mantle and foot. There are red dots in a circular pattern on its dorsum next to the mantle edge. Both its rhinophores and gills have the same pale-lemon color as its body, although there is some color variation among individuals. It reaches a length of at least 50 mm. This species has similar coloring to the seaslug Ardeadoris rubroannulata, although that species lacks the red dots present in Ardeadoris cruenta.

== Ecology ==
Like other Chromodorids, this species feeds on sponges.
