= Honolulu Rapid Transit and Land Company =

Overview
- Locale: Honolulu, Hawaiʻi
- Dates of operation: 1901–1941 (bus service until 1971)
- Successor: Mass Transit Lines (TheBus)

Technical
- Track gauge: 4 ft (1,219 mm)
- Electrification: 575 V DC
- Length: 30 mi (48 km)

The Honolulu Rapid Transit and Land Company (HRT) was a private transportation provider and land development company in Honolulu, Hawaiʻi. At its height, it operated over 30 miles (48 km) of streetcar tracks which had annual ridership of 20 million passengers.

HRT was incorporated on June 6, 1898 during the United States' annexation of the Kingdom of Hawaiʻi, when territorial lawmakers approved a franchise for an electric streetcar system. The system aimed to provide a modern alternative to Hawaiian Tramways, the existing horse-drawn tram company on Oʻahu. HRT's first streetcar ran on August 31, 1901; a single-ride fare cost five cents. Hawaiian Tramways was acquired two years later in 1903.

Lines were quickly built around central Honolulu, along with lines to the then-undeveloped neighborhoods of Kaimukī and Mānoa, which drew in businesses and residents to the areas. Branches of the system were also extended into Waikīkī, Fort Shafter, and Nuʻuanu Valley. HRT continued to develop several neighborhoods around the city, and also established the Honolulu Aquarium in 1904 as an attraction at the end of a line across from Kapiʻolani Park.

By 1910, the system transported 8.9 million passengers annually, equivalent to 110 rides per person per year for every person living on the island at the time. By 1923, HRT's streetcars had a ridership of 20 million per year.

Ridership declined through the late 1920s and 1930s due to the rising popularity of automobiles and buses. HRT had begun introducing motor buses into their fleet in 1915, along with trolleybuses (which used existing overhead electrical wiring) in 1937, both of which aimed to eliminate track and paving maintenance costs. With an increased focus on buses, the Nuʻuanu, Punahou, and Mānoa streetcar lines were demolished in 1934; some of the rail, only a few years old, was used to refurbish the King Street line. By 1935, HRT's system was nearly evenly split between the two modes of transport, with 45 trolleybuses and 50 streetcars in regular service.

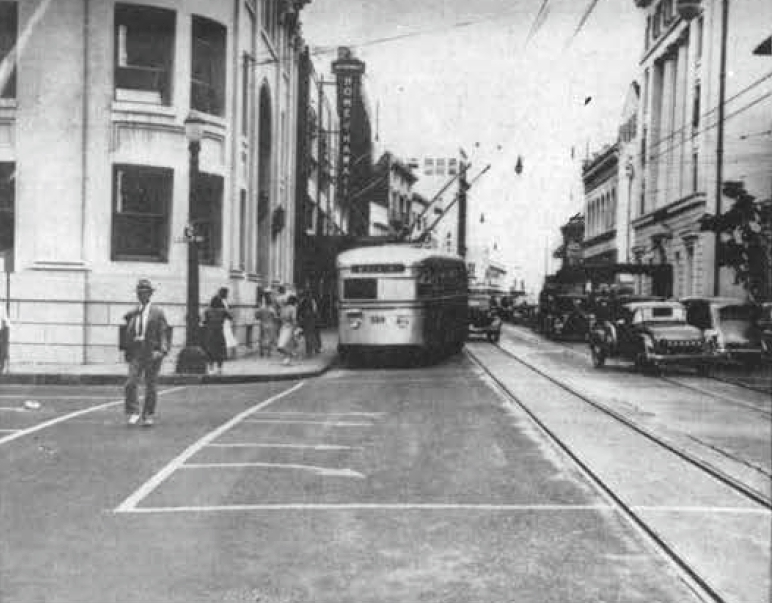
Honolulu trolleybus at the corner of King and Bishop Streets, on October 24, 1944.

The final streetcar ran shortly after midnight on July 1, 1941, with service converted to trolleybus later the same day. The company promoted the switch to "trackless trolleys" as the "greatest mass transportation improvement Honolulu has seen since the electric street cars of Rapid Transit replaced the mule drawn trams.

HRT's trolleybus service ceased on June 22, 1957, with a fleet of diesel buses fully replacing the 115 electric trolleybus coaches. By 1970, HRT saw 30 million annual passengers riding its fleet of 141 buses.

On January 1, 1971, 350 employees went on strike against HRT, which had been subject to a hostile takeover by billionaire businessman Harry Weinberg between the mid-1950s and 1960. The labor dispute was resolved on February 25, 1971 when HRT was purchased from Weinberg by the city-owned Mass Transit Lines Inc., which in turn was renamed TheBus the following month.
