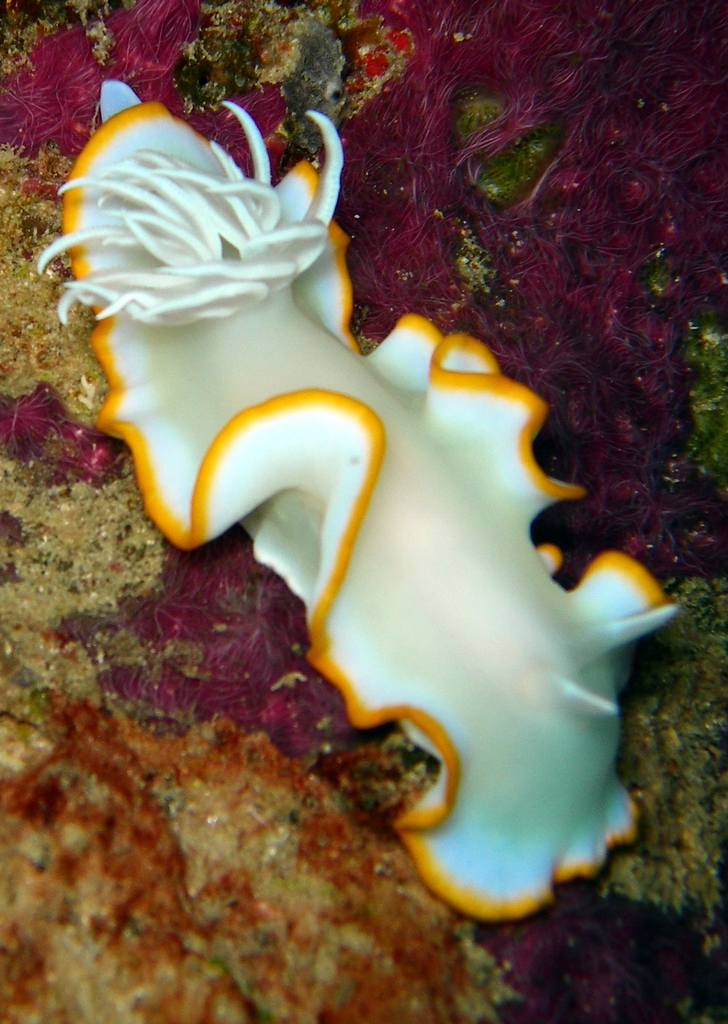
- Ardeadoris egretta

Scientific classification
- Kingdom: Animalia
- Phylum: Mollusca
- Class: Gastropoda
- Order: Nudibranchia
- Family: Chromodorididae
- Genus: Ardeadoris; Rudman, 1984

Type species
- Ardeadoris egretta Rudman, 1984

= Ardeadoris =

Genus of gastropods

Ardeadoris is a genus of sea slugs, specifically dorid nudibranchs, shell-less marine gastropod mollusks in the family Chromodorididae.

== Species ==
This genus includes the following species:

- Ardeadoris angustolutea (Rudman, 1990)
- Ardeadoris averni (Rudman, 1985)
- Ardeadoris carlsoni (Rudman, 1986)
- Ardeadoris cruenta (Rudman, 1986)
- Ardeadoris egretta Rudman, 1984 - heron ardeadoris
- Ardeadoris electra (Rudman, 1990)
- Ardeadoris poliahu (Bertsch & Gosliner, 1989)
- Ardeadoris pullata (Rudman, 1995)
- Ardeadoris rubroannulata (Rudman, 1986)
- Ardeadoris scottjohnsoni Bertsch & Gosliner, 1989
- Ardeadoris symmetrica (Rudman, 1990)
- Ardeadoris tomsmithi (Bertsch & Gosliner, 1989)
- Ardeadoris undaurum (Rudman, 1985)
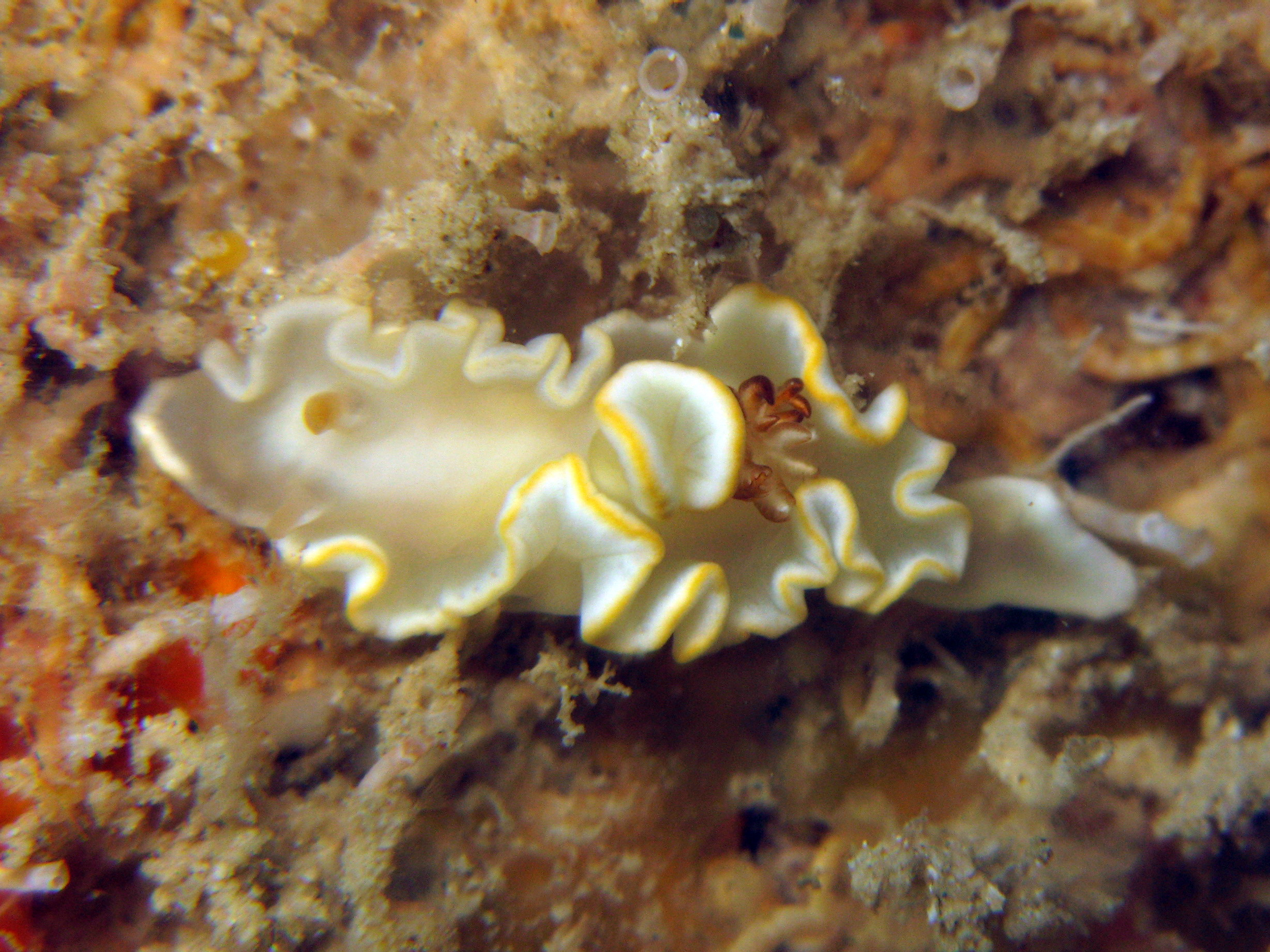
Ardeadoris angustolutea

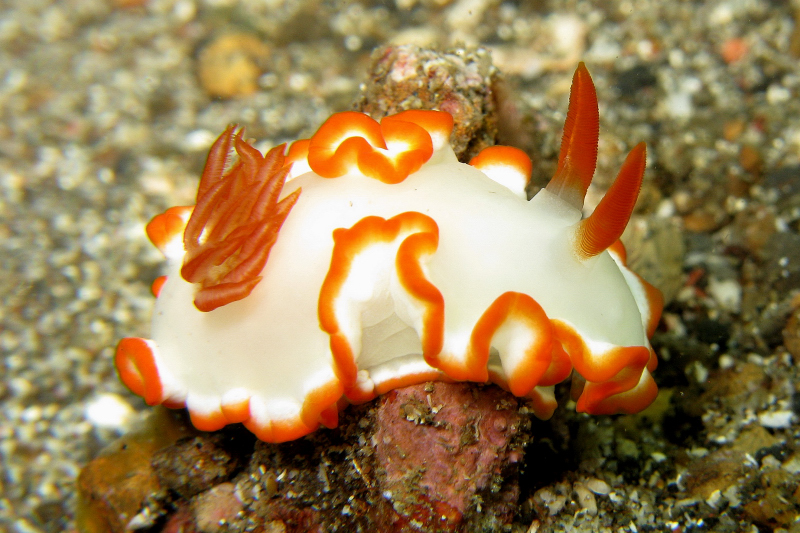
Ardeadoris averni

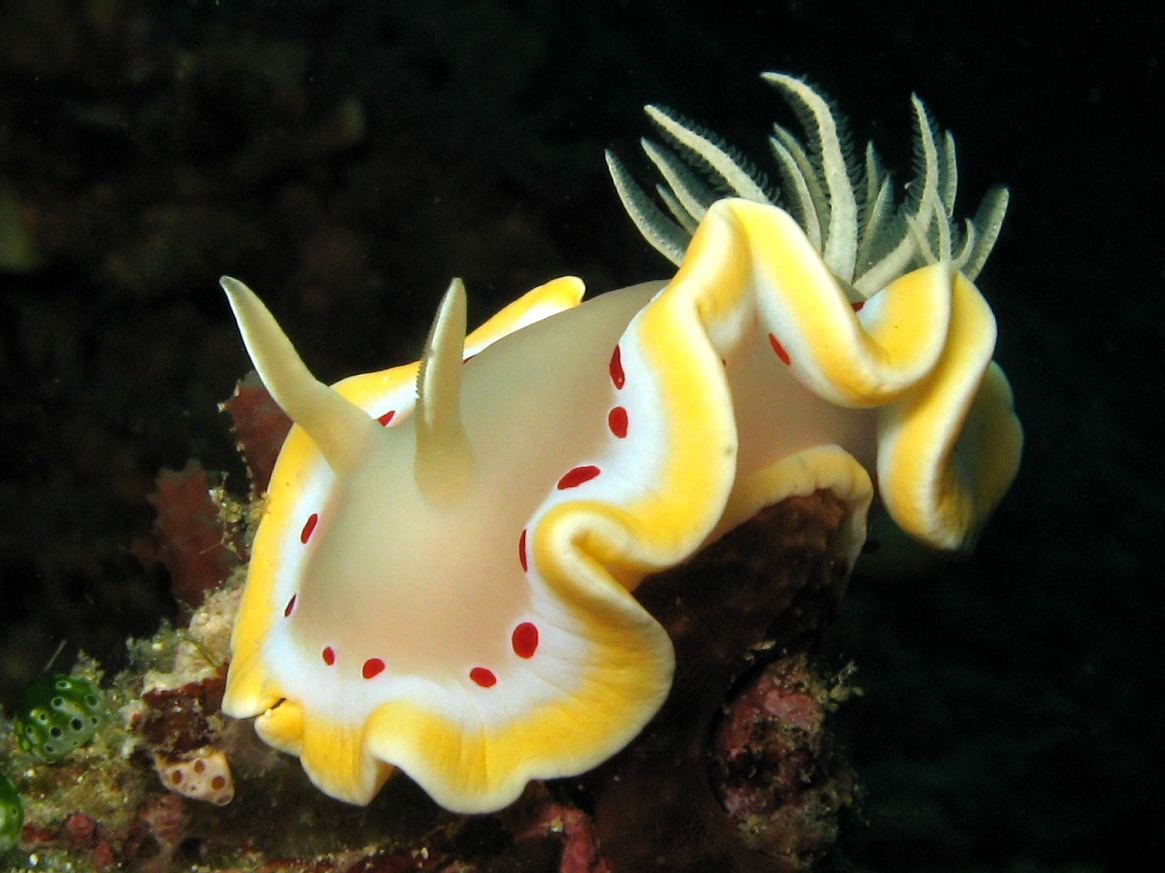
Ardeadoris cruenta

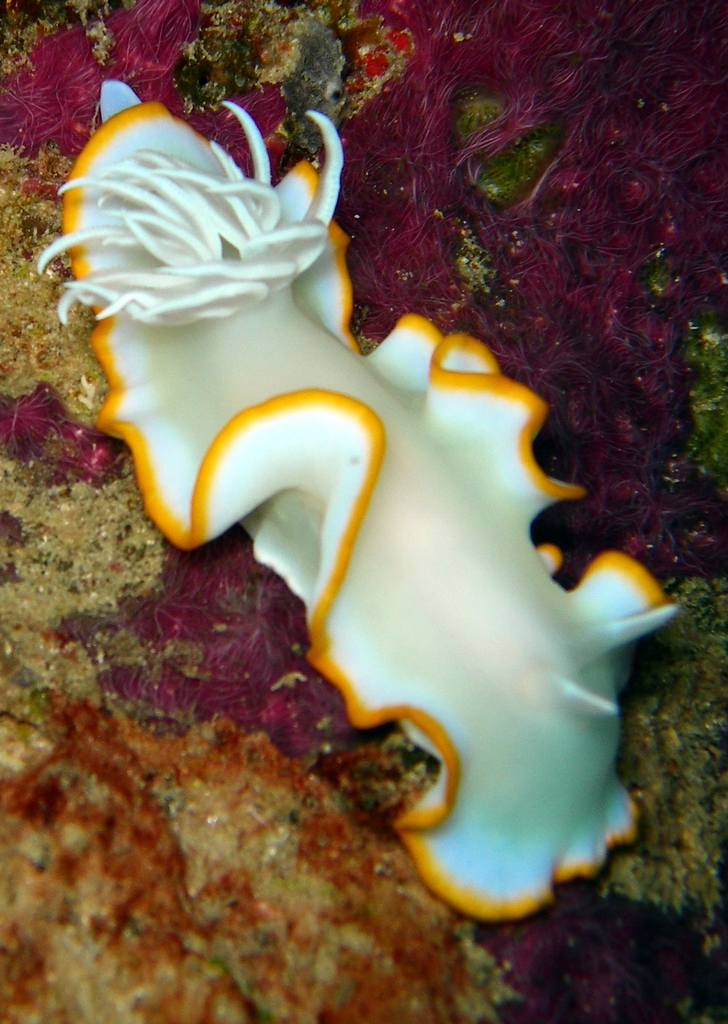
Ardeadoris egretta

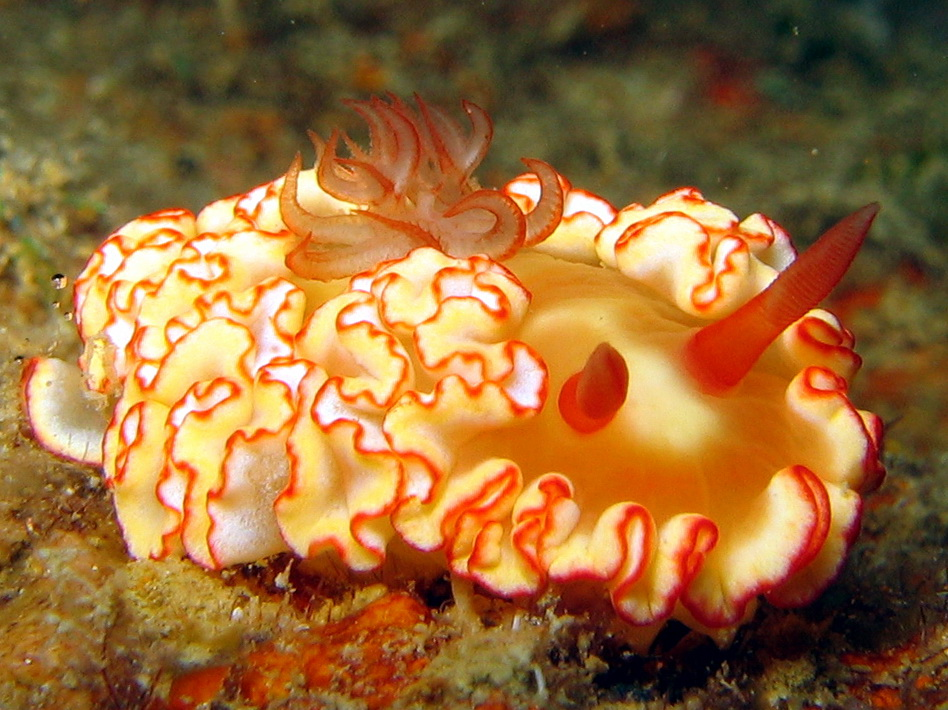
Ardeadoris symmetrica

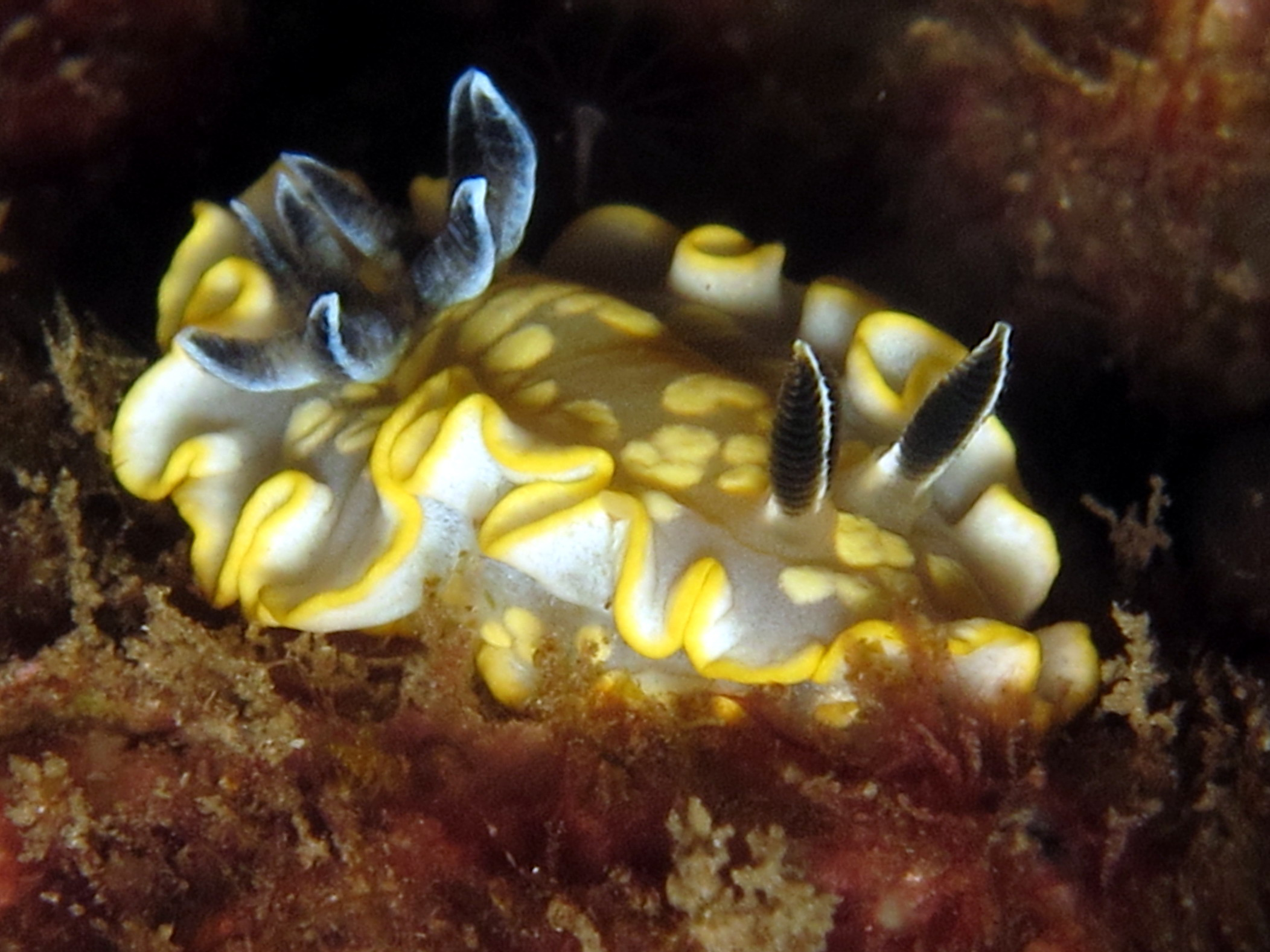
Ardeadoris tomsmithi
