= HOLO card =

Public transit smart card used on the island of Oʻahu in Hawaiʻi

- A standard Adult fare HOLO card
- Location: Island of Oʻahu, Hawaiʻi
- Launched: July 1, 2021 (Note: Date paper passes were discontinued; initial public availability in December 2018, full phase-in began April 2021.)
- Technology: Contactless smart card
- Operator: INIT
- Manager: City and County of Honolulu
- Currency: USD ($0 minimum load, $200 maximum load)
- Credit expiry: None
- Auto recharge: Yes
- Validity: TheBus; Skyline
- Variants: Adult; Youth; Senior; Medicare; Reduced Fare; Disability; Handi-Van
- Website: www.holocard.net

The HOLO card is a contactless smart card used to pay for public transit fares on the island of Oʻahu in Hawaiʻi. The card is used to hold cash value or passes for use on TheBus and the Skyline rail system. The card is used by tapping it on a reader terminal when boarding TheBus or at a Skyline faregate. Cards can be loaded online at the HOLO card's website, over the phone, or in person at various retail locations.

Holo is a Hawaiian word that means to "ride," "go," or "flow." Reduplicated, holoholo means "to go out for pleasure."

== Background ==
The HOLO card was created by the City and County of Honolulu as a way to allow seamless transfers between TheBus and Skyline. Prior to the introduction of the card, TheBus users either paid cash fares or purchased paper passes. INIT was contracted in 2016 to develop, manage, and operate the HOLO card system.

The card was initially released to the public on a pilot basis in December 2018. Paper day, monthly, and yearly passes were phased out beginning in April 2021, and were completely discontinued by July 1, 2021. All cards were issued for free prior to March 1, 2022. There is a $2 fee for new and replacement cards to promote the reuse of cards, with selected discounted fare categories exempted from the fee for new cards.

== Usage ==
The HOLO card uses a fare-capping system, similar to the Hop Fastpass card used in Portland, Oregon, where users are not charged for additional fares after paying an amount equal to the cost of a day pass over the course of a single day, or after paying an amount equal to the cost of a monthly pass over a single month. The card also includes a transfer function where users who board multiple buses or trains within a 2-hour window are not charged an additional fare regardless of whether or not they have reached a daily or monthly cap amount. Paying cash fares does not allow for transfers.

The card is used by first being loaded with cash value or a pass, then by tapping the card on a card reader when boarding a bus or passing through a rail station's fare gate. Users have the option of creating an account to allow the card to be registered to an individual and reloaded via the HOLO card's website. Registering a card also allows any cash value or passes loaded on the card to be replaced if the card is lost or stolen, and for the card to be remotely disabled at any time.

Use of the card may be extended in the future to include Biki, Honolulu's bikeshare system, paying for admission to City-operated facilities such as the Honolulu Zoo and Hanauma Bay, and municipal parking.

== Design ==
The standard HOLO design features a blue and white background with a geometric pattern, reminiscent of motifs seen on aloha shirts worn by TheBus operators. The fare type is printed on the bottom in capital letters, stylized in the Knockout typeface. The adult card features a blue stripe at the bottom while youth cards feature a navy stripe. Other fare types are printed vertically; senior and disability feature an orange-red stripe, reduced fare (low income) cards a red one, Medicare cards gray-blue, and Handi-Van cards green.

Three commemorative designs were released in June 2023 in partnership with Zippy's to celebrate the opening of Skyline. The limited-edition cards featured background patterns resembling the manu-o-Kū and were initially available at four restaurant locations along phase 1 of the rail line. Further commemorative designs have since been released, such as for Christmas and the Great Aloha Run.
