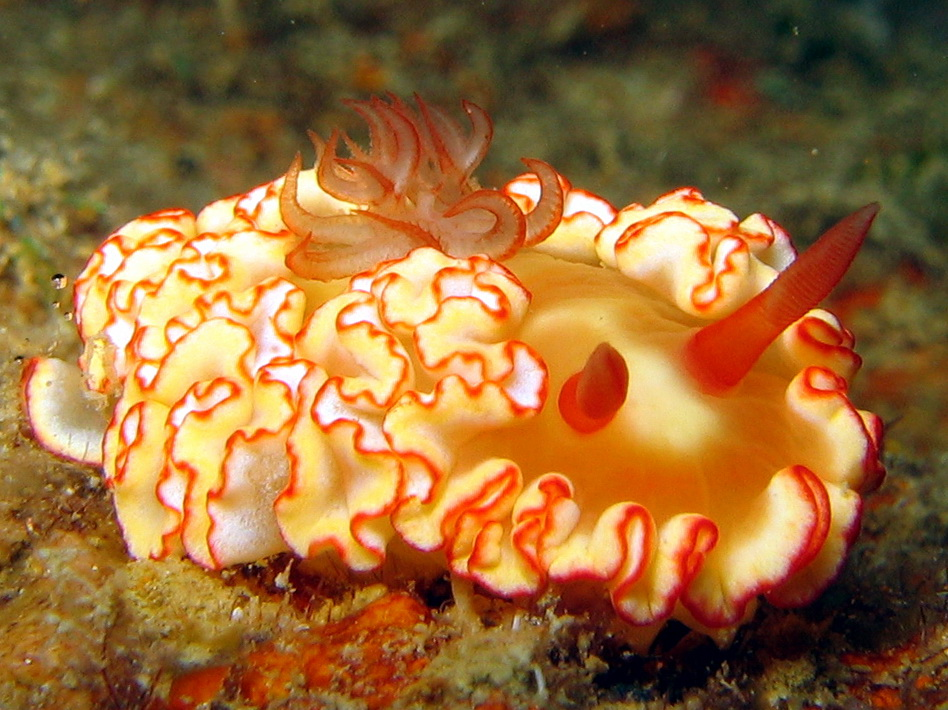

Scientific classification
- Kingdom: Animalia
- Phylum: Mollusca
- Class: Gastropoda
- Order: Nudibranchia
- Family: Chromodorididae
- Genus: Ardeadoris
- Species: A. symmetrica

Binomial name
- Ardeadoris symmetrica (Rudman, 1990)

Synonyms
- Glossodoris symmetrica Rudman, 1990 (basionym)

= Ardeadoris symmetrica =

Species of gastropod

Ardeadoris symmetrica is a species of sea slug, a dorid nudibranch, a shell-less marine gastropod mollusk in the family Chromodorididae.

== Distribution ==
This species is found in the tropical Indo-West Pacific Ocean. The type specimen was found in the Indian Ocean off Réunion.
