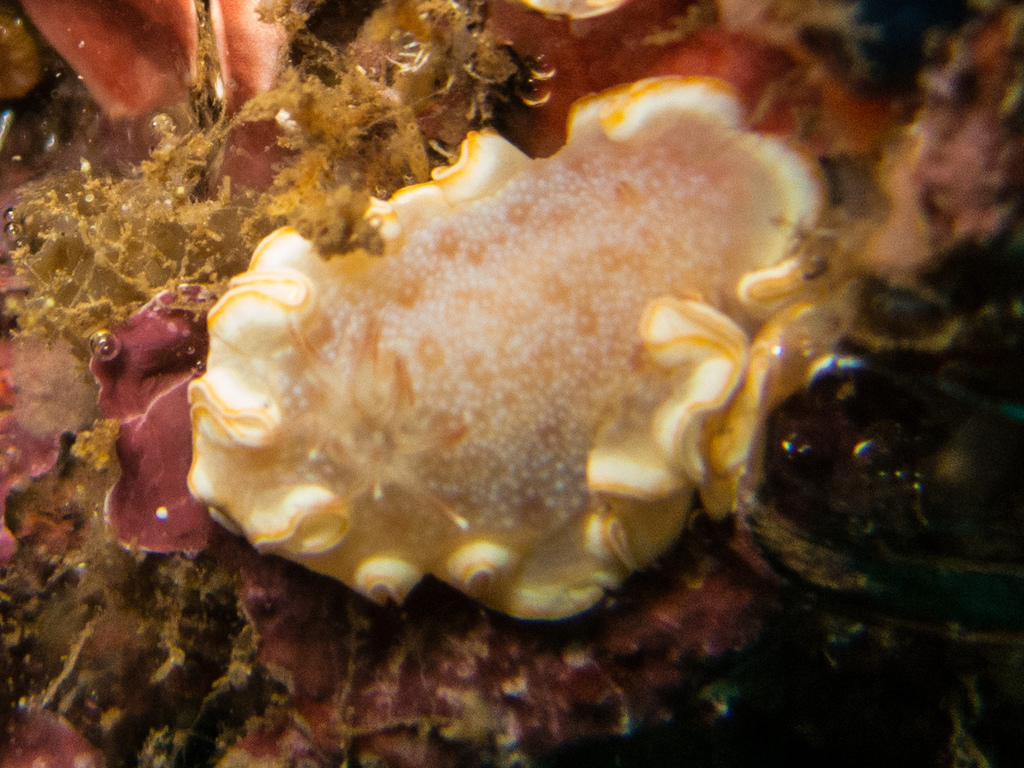

Scientific classification
- Kingdom: Animalia
- Phylum: Mollusca
- Class: Gastropoda
- Order: Nudibranchia
- Family: Chromodorididae
- Genus: Ardeadoris
- Species: A. poliahu

Binomial name
- Ardeadoris poliahu (Bertsch & Gosliner, 1989)

Synonyms
- Glossodoris poliahu Bertsch & Gosliner, 1989 (basionym)

= Ardeadoris poliahu =

Species of gastropod

Ardeadoris poliahu is a species of sea slug, a dorid nudibranch, a shell-less marine gastropod mollusk in the family Chromodorididae.

== Distribution ==
This species is known only from the Hawaiian Islands.
