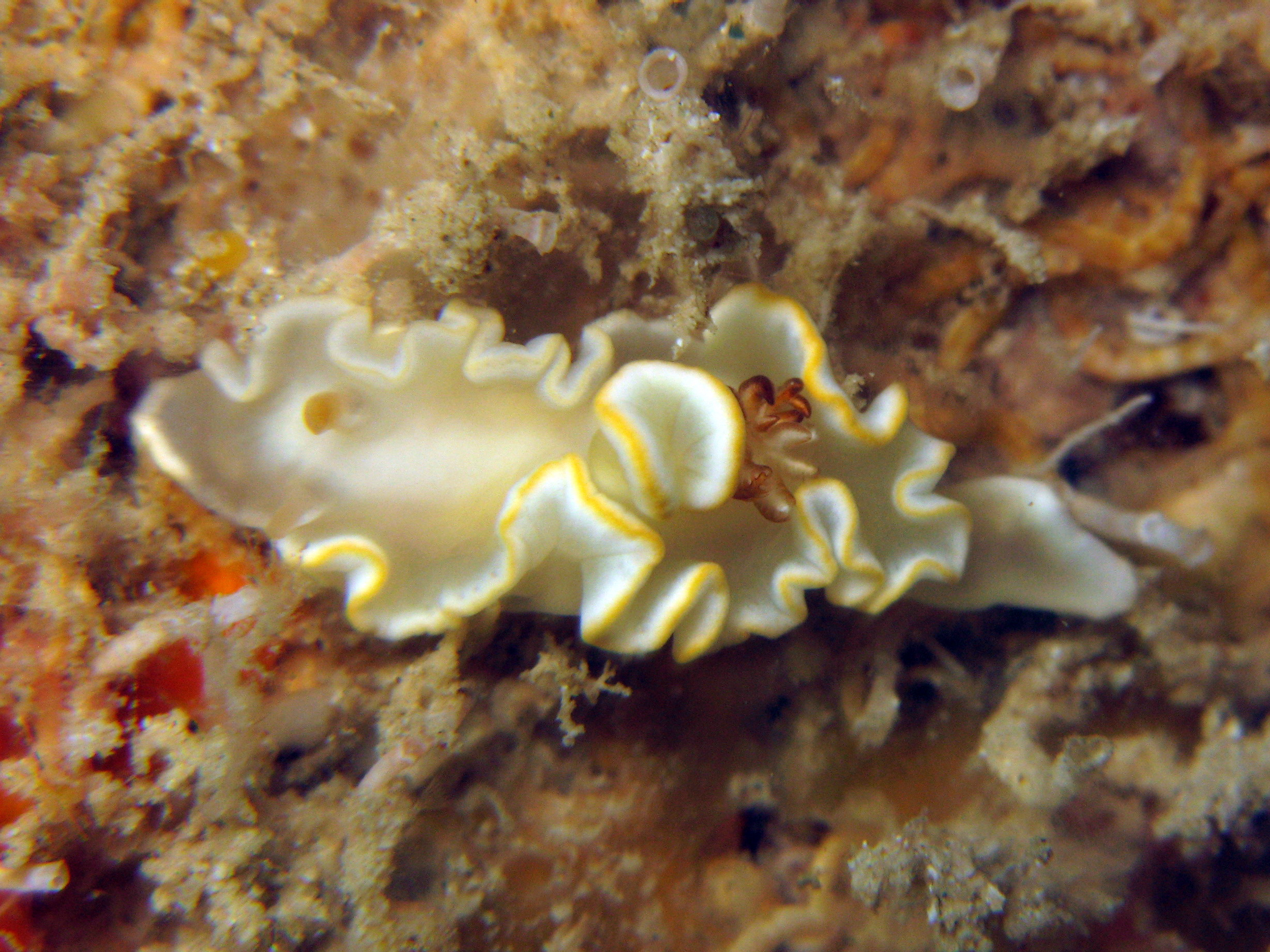
- Ardeadoris angustolutea in Guam, head end towards the left

Scientific classification
- Kingdom: Animalia
- Phylum: Mollusca
- Class: Gastropoda
- Order: Nudibranchia
- Family: Chromodorididae
- Genus: Ardeadoris
- Species: A. angustolutea

Binomial name
- Ardeadoris angustolutea (Rudman, 1990)

Synonyms
- Noumea angustolutea Rudman, 1990 (basionym)

= Ardeadoris angustolutea =

Species of gastropod

Ardeadoris angustolutea is a species of colourful sea slug, a dorid nudibranch, a shell-less marine gastropod mollusc in the family Chromodorididae. It was transferred to the genus Ardeadoris on the basis of DNA evidence.

== Distribution ==
This species was described from Ruby Reef, 15.733°S 145.783°E Great Barrier Reef, Queensland, Australia. It occurs in the tropical Indo-West Pacific regions, with confirmed sightings from the Philippines, Thailand, Guam, Hawaii and the Marshall Islands.

== Description ==
The mantle in this species is an almost translucent white in colour. The mantle border ranges in colour from opaque white to orange-yellow. The midline of the body has a more opaque line that runs from the rhinophores to the posterior branchia (gills). The rhinophores and branchia have an orange-brown tint.

== Ecology ==
The exact food source for this sea slug is not yet known but the type specimen was found on a purple sponge species which is probably its food.
