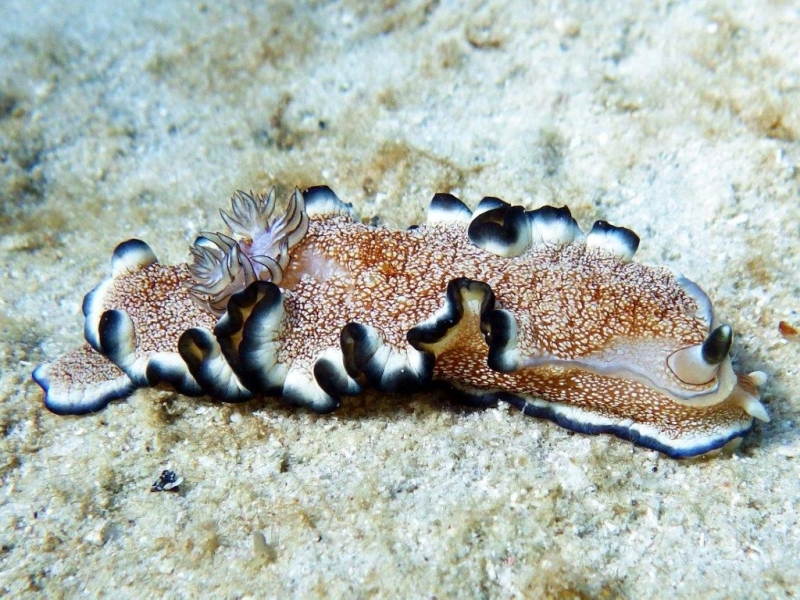

Scientific classification
- Kingdom: Animalia
- Phylum: Mollusca
- Class: Gastropoda
- Order: Nudibranchia
- Family: Chromodorididae
- Genus: Ardeadoris
- Species: A. pullata

Binomial name
- Ardeadoris pullata (Rudman, 1995)

Synonyms
- Glossodoris pullata Rudman, 1995 (basionym)

= Ardeadoris pullata =

Species of gastropod

Ardeadoris pullata is a species of sea slug, a dorid nudibranch, a shell-less marine gastropod mollusk in the family Chromodorididae.

== Distribution ==
This species is found only in New Caledonia.
