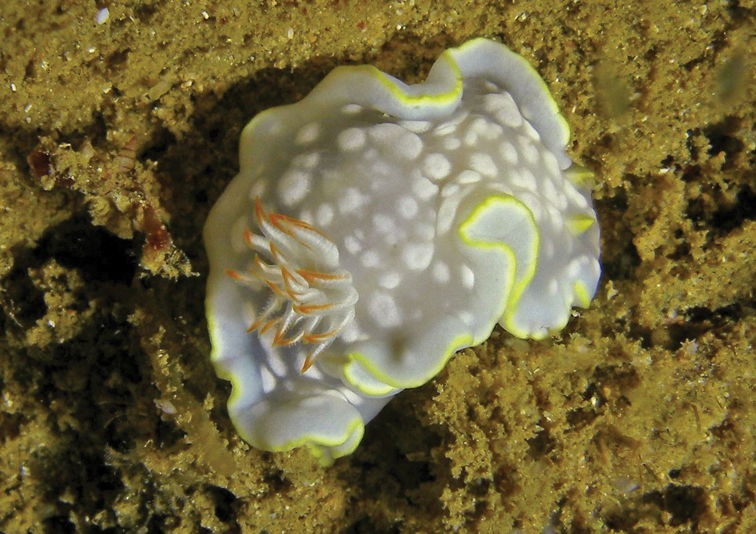

Scientific classification
- Kingdom: Animalia
- Phylum: Mollusca
- Class: Gastropoda
- Order: Nudibranchia
- Family: Chromodorididae
- Genus: Ardeadoris
- Species: A. undaurum

Binomial name
- Ardeadoris undaurum (Rudman, 1985)

Synonyms
- Glossodoris undaurum Rudman, 1985 (basionym)

= Ardeadoris undaurum =

Species of gastropod

Ardeadoris undaurum is a species of sea slug, a dorid nudibranch, a shell-less marine gastropod mollusk in the family Chromodorididae.

== Distribution ==
This species is found in the Indian Ocean from Australia to South Africa. The type specimen was found off Carnac Island, Western Australia.
