= Ardeadoris scottjohnsoni =

Scientific classification
- Kingdom: Animalia
- Phylum: Mollusca
- Class: Gastropoda
- Order: Nudibranchia
- Family: Chromodorididae
- Genus: Ardeadoris
- Species: A. scottjohnsoni

Binomial name
- Ardeadoris scottjohnsoni Bertsch & Gosliner, 1989

Species of gastropod

Ardeadoris scottjohnsoni is a species of sea slug, a dorid nudibranch, a shell-less marine gastropod mollusk in the family Chromodorididae.

== Distribution ==
This species was described from Hawaii. It seems to be endemic to the Hawaiian Islands.

== Description ==
This nudibranch has a white body with a yellow-edged mantle border. Its gills have white bases with black tips and the rhinophores have transparent bases and black clubs, with a thin electric-blue vertical line. It grows to 30 mm (1.2 in) in length.
