= Harry and Jeanette Weinberg Foundation =

American philanthropic organization

- Industry: Philanthropy
- Founded: 1959; 67 years ago
- Founders: Harry Weinberg, Jeanette Weinberg
- Headquarters: Baltimore, Maryland and Honolulu, Hawaii
- Number of locations: 2
- Key people: Paula B. Pretlow, Robert T. Kelly Jr., Gordon Berlin, Nimrod Goor, Margery Bronster
- Website: hjweinbergfoundation.org

The Harry and Jeanette Weinberg Foundation is an American philanthropic organization founded by the businessman Harry Weinberg. The foundation has offices in Baltimore, Maryland and Honolulu, Hawaii. It is the largest Jewish-oriented foundation in the United States.

== History ==
Harry Weinberg, a real estate and transit businessman in Baltimore and Honolulu, established the foundation in 1959. Weinberg was responsible for all foundation decisions regarding grants. When he died in 1990, he bequeathed almost all of his wealth, bringing the foundation's assets to approximately $900 million. Upon Weinberg's death, he named Bernard Siegel, his closest associate during the 1970s and 1980s, as the foundation's first president. His wife Jeanette died in 1989. In 1990, it was the largest foundation in Maryland and the eleventh largest in the United States. The foundation's charter stipulated that 25% of the foundation's donations go to Jewish organizations, 25% to "non-Jewish" organizations, and 50% to organizations that don't serve any particular "color, creed or race." Because Harry Weinberg wanted the foundation to strictly benefit the poor, the charter prohibited donations to universities, colleges, orchestras, and museums. According to the foundation's attorney, Shale D. Stiller, Weinberg "never forgot where he came from...his immigrant family background and the fact that he had nothing as a child...That's why the foundation is directed only at poor people."

In a 2003 Baltimore Sun profile, Siegel cited Weinberg's philanthropic influences as Andrew Carnegie and Johns Hopkins. The foundation gave to recipients all over the world, with a focus on Weinberg's native Baltimore area, where the Weinbergs have their name on at least 65 buildings.

During the 2023 Hawaii wildfires, the foundation donated $850,000 in grants to three relief organizations in Hawaii.

By 2018, the foundation was one of the 20 largest foundations in the United States, distributing more than $100 million per year from more than $2.5 billion in assets.

Between 2006 and 2023, the foundation was the largest donor to CASA de Maryland, a Latino and immigrant rights group, giving $5 million, including capital grants, over that period. During the Gaza war, CASA de Maryland issued a statement calling for a ceasefire and proclaiming their solidarity with Palestinians. Several days after the statement was issued, officials from the Weinberg Foundation met with officials from CASA to express that they were "deeply disturbed" by the statement as well as a photo posted by a CASA official that included the slogan "From the river to the sea". The Weinberg Foundation stated that the slogan was "indefensible" as a "call for the elimination of the State of Israel and the removal of its Jewish citizens". The foundation removed its name from two CASA buildings it had helped fund and cut the remaining 2024 grant of $150,000.

== See also ==
- Harry Weinberg
