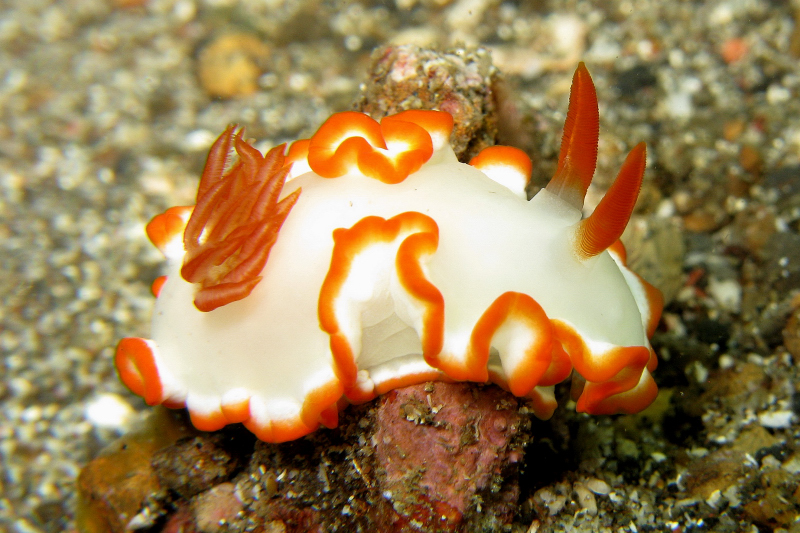

Scientific classification
- Kingdom: Animalia
- Phylum: Mollusca
- Class: Gastropoda
- Order: Nudibranchia
- Family: Chromodorididae
- Genus: Ardeadoris
- Species: A. averni

Binomial name
- Ardeadoris averni (Rudman, 1985)

Synonyms
- Glossodoris averni Rudman, 1985 (basionym)

= Ardeadoris averni =

Species of gastropod

Ardeadoris averni is a species of sea slug, a dorid nudibranch, a shell-less marine gastropod mollusc in the family Chromodorididae. It was transferred to the genus Ardeadoris on the basis of DNA evidence.

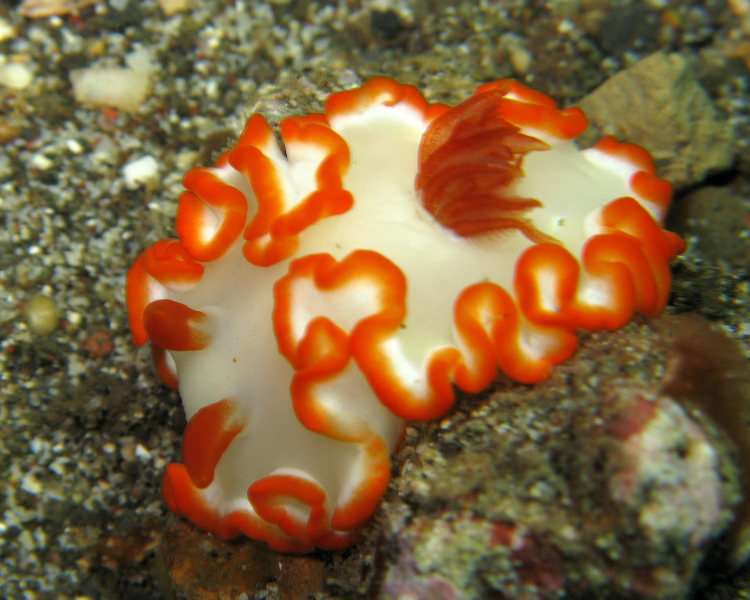
Ardeadoris averni

== Distribution ==
This species was described from the Capricorn Group, Great Barrier Reef, Queensland, Australia. It is also found in the Western Pacific Ocean from Papua New Guinea and the Philippines.

== Description ==
Ardeadoris averni is white with a bright red border to the mantle. The gills and rhinophores are white with red lines. It grows to 55 mm in length.
