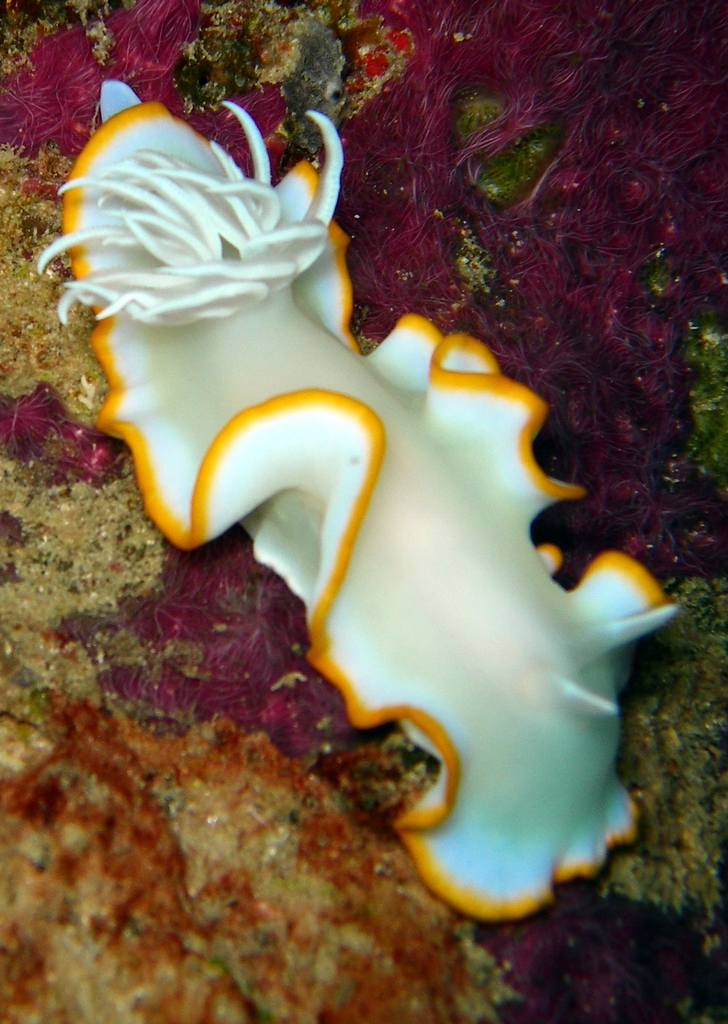

Scientific classification
- Kingdom: Animalia
- Phylum: Mollusca
- Class: Gastropoda
- Order: Nudibranchia
- Family: Chromodorididae
- Genus: Ardeadoris
- Species: A. egretta

Binomial name
- Ardeadoris egretta Rudman, 1984

= Ardeadoris egretta =

Species of gastropod

Ardeadoris egretta, the heron ardeadoris, is a species of sea slug, a dorid nudibranch, a shell-less marine gastropod mollusc in the family Chromodorididae. It is the type species of the genus Ardeadoris.

== Description ==
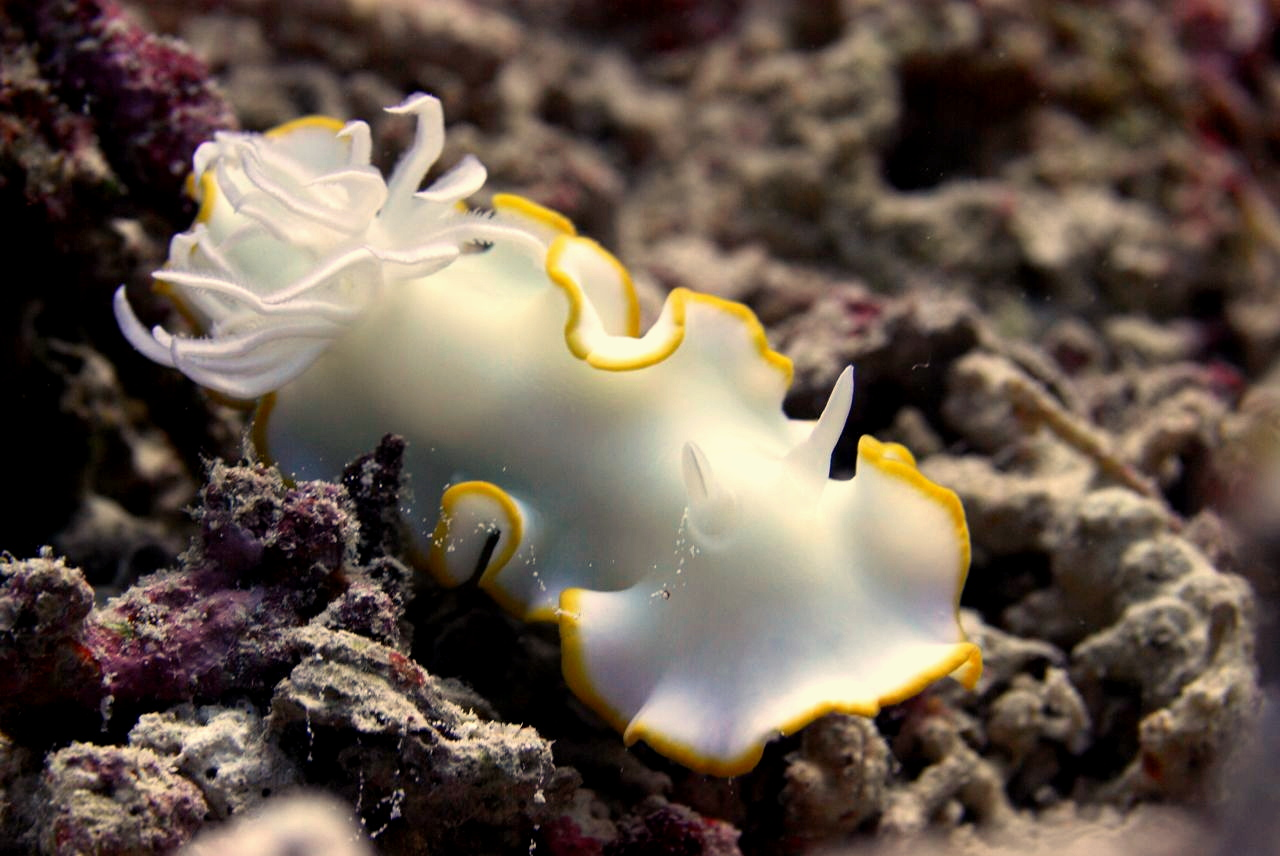
Ardeadoris egretta

This white slug with a yellow border grows to a length of about 12 cm (4.7 in).

== Distribution ==
The species is found in depths of 1–1,014 m (3 ft 3 in – 3,326 ft 9 in) in tropical habitats. It was described from Escape Reef and other sites on the Great Barrier Reef, Australia. It occurs in the Indian Ocean and the tropical Western Pacific in Malaysia, Indonesia and the Solomon Islands.
