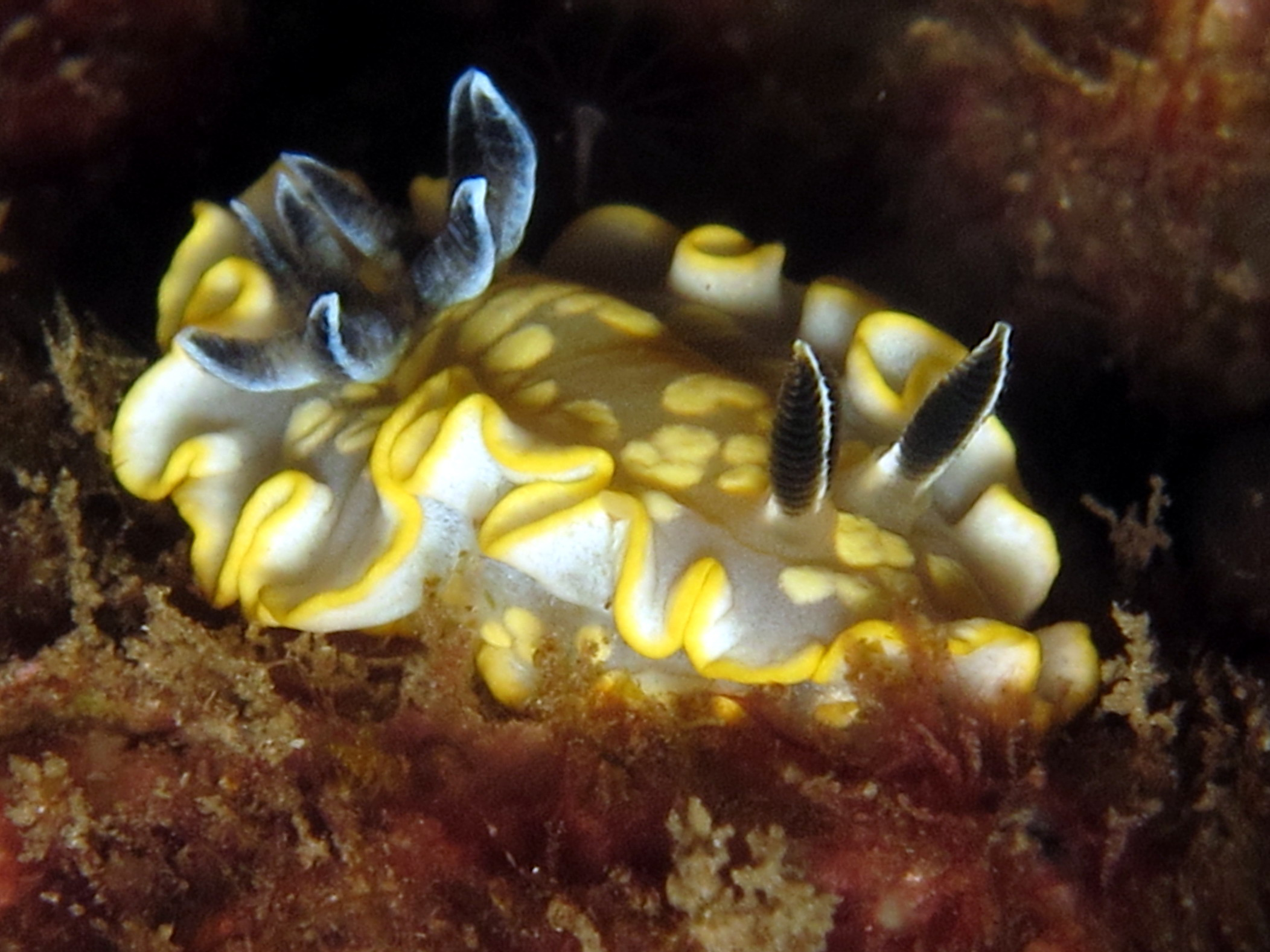
- Ardeadoris tomsmithi

Scientific classification
- Kingdom: Animalia
- Phylum: Mollusca
- Class: Gastropoda
- Order: Nudibranchia
- Family: Chromodorididae
- Genus: Ardeadoris
- Species: A. tomsmithi

Binomial name
- Ardeadoris tomsmithi (Bertsch & Gosliner, 1989)

Synonyms
- Glossodoris tomsmithi Bertsch & Gosliner, 1989 (basionym)

= Ardeadoris tomsmithi =

Species of gastropod

Ardeadoris tomsmithi is a species of sea slug, a dorid nudibranch, a shell-less marine gastropod mollusk in the family Chromodorididae.

== Distribution ==
This species is found in the tropical Pacific Ocean, from Hawaii to the Marshall Islands, Okinawa and Western Australia.
