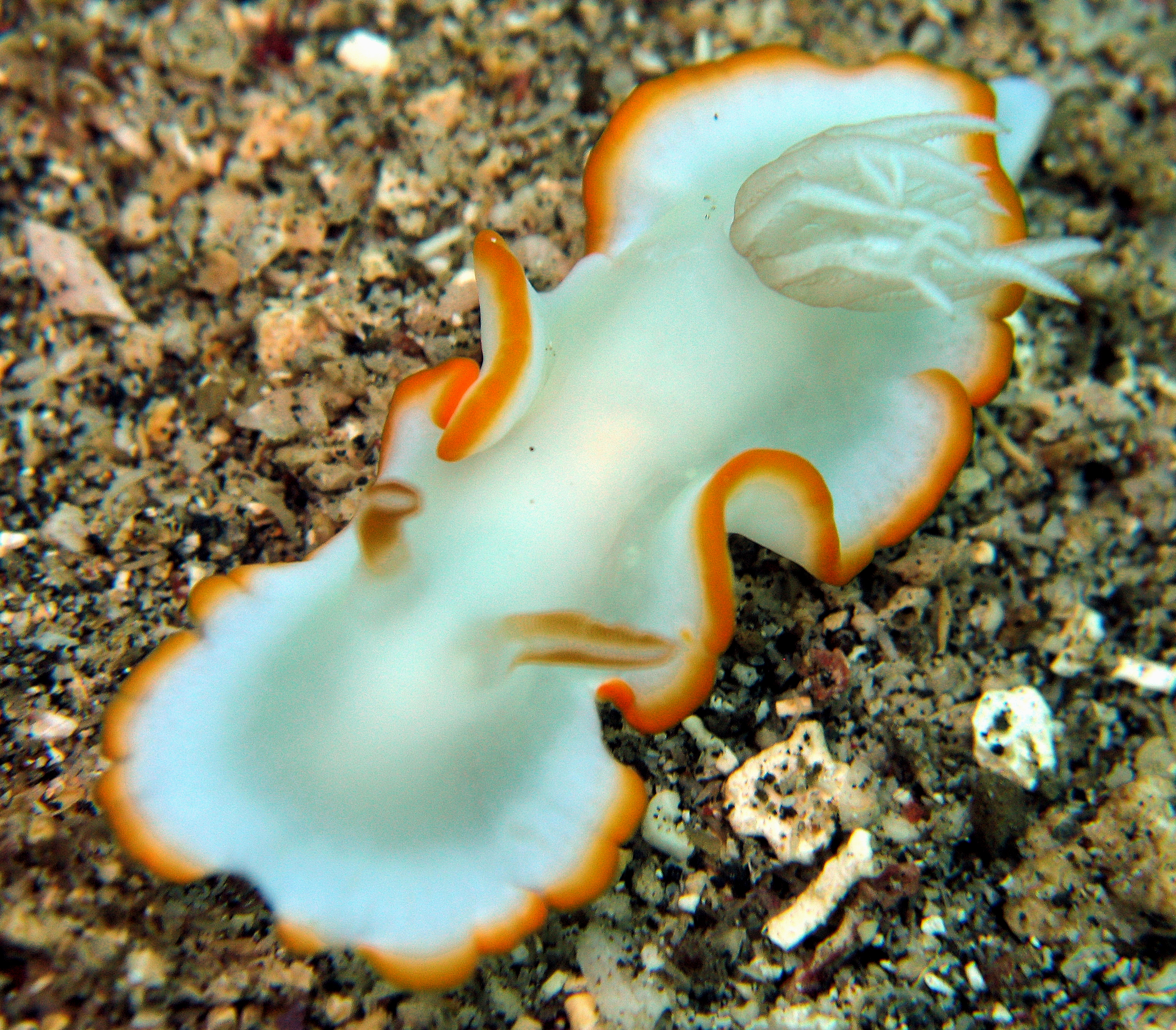

Scientific classification
- Kingdom: Animalia
- Phylum: Mollusca
- Class: Gastropoda
- Order: Nudibranchia
- Family: Chromodorididae
- Genus: Ardeadoris
- Species: A. electra

Binomial name
- Ardeadoris electra (Rudman, 1990)

Synonyms
- Glossodoris electra Rudman, 1990 (basionym)

= Ardeadoris electra =

Species of gastropod

Ardeadoris electra is a species of sea slug, a dorid nudibranch, a shell-less marine gastropod mollusc in the family Chromodorididae. It was transferred to the genus Ardeadoris on the basis of DNA evidence.

== Distribution ==
This species is found in the tropical Western Pacific Ocean around eastern Australia and New Caledonia.
