= Ardeadoris carlsoni =

Scientific classification
- Kingdom: Animalia
- Phylum: Mollusca
- Class: Gastropoda
- Order: Nudibranchia
- Family: Chromodorididae
- Genus: Ardeadoris
- Species: A. carlsoni

Binomial name
- Ardeadoris carlsoni (Rudman, 1986)

Synonyms
- Glossodoris carlsoni Rudman, 1986 (basionym)

Species of gastropod

Ardeadoris carlsoni is a species of sea slug, a dorid nudibranch, a shell-less marine gastropod mollusc in the family Chromodorididae. It was transferred to the genus Ardeadoris on the basis of DNA evidence.

== Distribution ==
This species was described from Beqa Lagoon, Yanuca Island, Fiji, in the Western Pacific Ocean.

== Description ==
Ardeadoris carlsoni has a pale, orange-yellow mantle with paler blotches. There is a white band at the edge of the mantle and a thin orange band at the very edge.
