= Harry Weinberg =

American businessman and philanthropist

- Born: 1908; Galicia, Austro-Hungarian Empire (now Poland)
- Died: Honolulu, Hawaii, U.S.
- Known for: Founding The Harry and Jeanette Weinberg Foundation
- Spouse: Jeanette Gutman (1932-1989)
- Children: Morton Weinberg

Harry Weinberg (1908–1990) was an American billionaire businessman who founded The Harry and Jeanette Weinberg Foundation, Inc., a private charitable foundation, with over $2 billion in assets in 2018 and headquartered in Owings Mills, Maryland and Honolulu, Hawaii. The foundation is named for Weinberg and his wife of 58 years, Jeanette Gutman Weinberg (1909–1989).

== Biography ==
Weinberg was born in 1908 in Galicia, then part of the Austro-Hungarian Empire, to a poor Jewish family. His father Joseph Weinberg came to Baltimore, Maryland in the US, and sent for his family in 1912. One of his earliest ventures was selling souvenirs for celebrations at the end of World War I. He dropped out of school at age 12 and worked in his father's car repair shop.

== Career ==
During the Great Depression of the 1930s, he and his brother William would buy properties at depressed prices, fix them up, and resell them for a profit. Throughout his career he was known for being a keen judge of undervalued assets, and having the patience to wait for their values to increase. In Honolulu, Hawaii, he repeated this with the Fifth Avenue Coach Company, in Scranton, Pennsylvania and Dallas, Texas. He started buying stock in the Honolulu Rapid Transit and Land Company (now known as TheBus) in 1955, eventually gained control via a hostile takeover, slashed costs, and then sold it at a profit to the City & County of Honolulu in 1971. In 1968 he moved to Hawaii where he died November 4, 1990. His investments included Amfac, Inc., Maui Land & Pineapple Company, Alexander & Baldwin, and other real estate ventures.

Critics alleged that Weinberg was a slumlord who neglected his properties on Howard Street and elsewhere in Baltimore.

== Foundation ==
The Harry and Jeanette Weinberg Foundation was originally established in 1959. Upon his death in 1990 he left $3 million to his grandchildren. His will left almost US$1 billion of property to the foundation.

Weinberg's will specified that 25 percent of annual distributions will go to Jewish charities and further specifies that the proceeds shall be used for the benefit of the poor, and bans gifts to music or arts institutions. The assets continued to grow in value, while large grants enabled entire buildings to be built, such as the Harry and Jeanette Weinberg Memorial Library at the University of Scranton.

Throughout Baltimore and the Hawaiian Islands, many major civic and private buildings and complexes were named after Harry and Jeanette Weinberg. Before his death in 1990, he had decreed that any building for which his charitable foundation gave more than $250,000 would have the couple's name on it somewhere...(Weinberg's) charter allows the foundation to contribute no more than 30 percent of a project's cost. [Baltimore Sun December 7, 2003|By Kate Shatzkin] One of the largest projects named in their honor was the Filipino Community Center in Waipahu, Hawaii, dedicated by Philippines President Gloria Macapagal Arroyo and representatives of President of the United States George W. Bush in 2002. The Filipino Community Center is one of the largest ethnic and cultural centers in the United States. Other projects include the Ko Olina Resort, which asked for $75 million in tax credits.

The Harry and Jeanette Weinberg Foundation is administered by a board of trustees that at times includes members of the Weinberg family. Members are usually professionals residing in Honolulu and Baltimore.

== Personal life ==
In 1932 he married Jeanette Gutman (1910–1989). A supporter of Israel, in 1984 he had donated funds to air condition all of Israel's nursing homes.

His wife predeceased him in 1989. On his death in 1990 from bone cancer, he was survived by one son, Morton Weinberg, and left $3 million to his grandchildren, although nothing for Morton. “What could anyone do about it anyway?”, Morton said. His will left the remainder, almost US$1 billion of property, to the Harry and Jeanette Weinberg Foundation they had founded in 1959.
