= Ardeadoris rubroannulata =

Scientific classification
- Kingdom: Animalia
- Phylum: Mollusca
- Class: Gastropoda
- Order: Nudibranchia
- Family: Chromodorididae
- Genus: Ardeadoris
- Species: A. rubroannulata

Binomial name
- Ardeadoris rubroannulata (Rudman, 1986)

Synonyms
- Glossodoris rubroannulata Rudman, 1986 (basionym)

Species of gastropod

Ardeadoris rubroannulata is a species of sea slug, a dorid nudibranch, a shell-less marine gastropod mollusk in the family Chromodorididae.

== Distribution ==
This species is found only along the Great Barrier Reef in Australia and in New Caledonia.
