= Leslie S. Libow =

American geriatrician (born 1933)

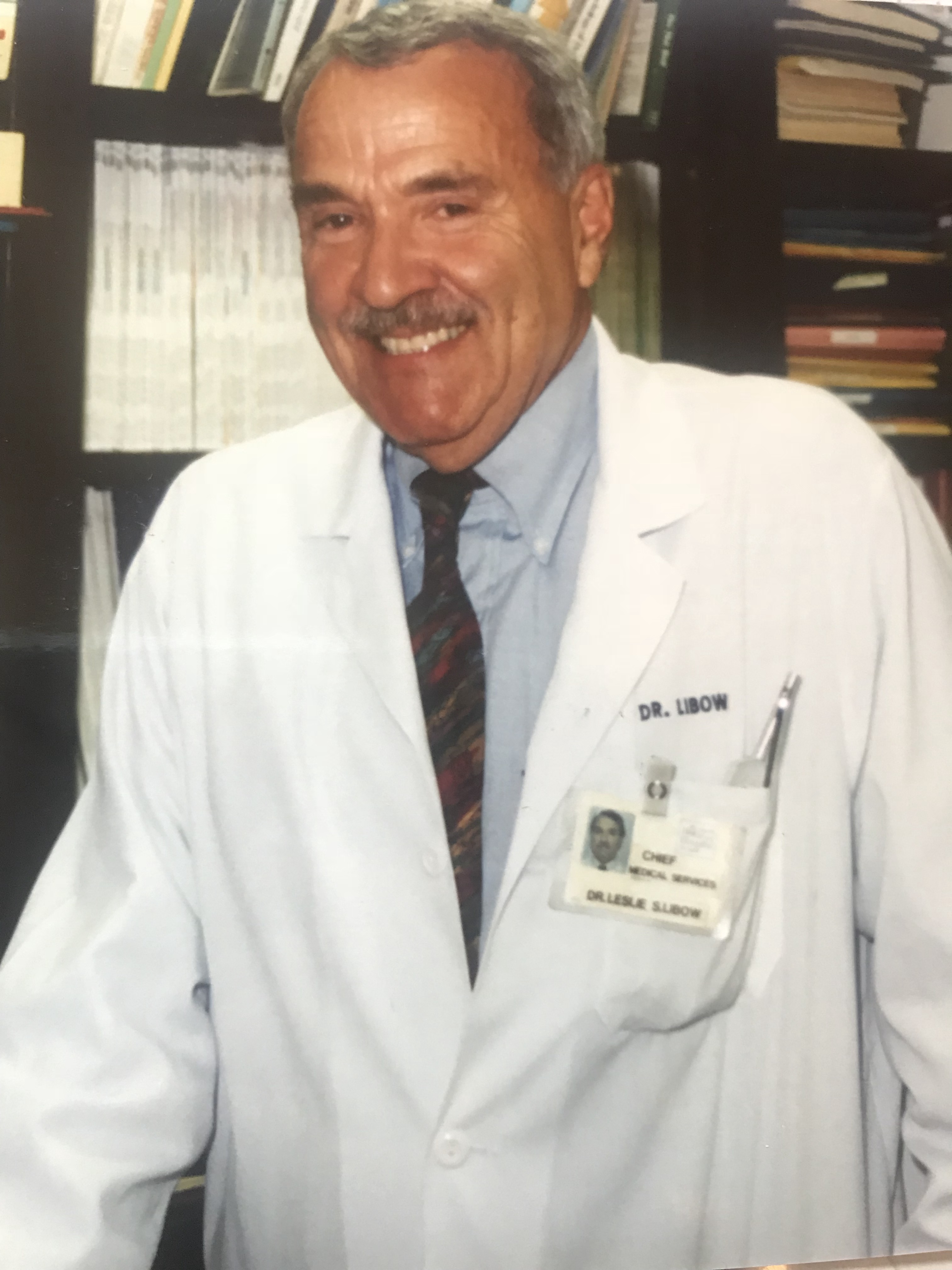
- Born: 26 December 1933 (age 92); Brooklyn, New York
- Education: CUNY Brooklyn College ('52) Chicago Medical School ('58)

Leslie S. Libow (born December 26, 1933) is Clinical Professor of Medicine and of Geriatrics at the Icahn School of Medicine at Mount Sinai. He previously was Greenwall Professor of Geriatrics and Adult Development at Icahn School of Medicine at Mount Sinai from 1982 to 2011 and Chief of Medical Services at the Jewish Home and Hospital from 1982 to 2004. Libow is an authority on internal and geriatric medicine and is also known for creating the field of geriatric medicine in America.
