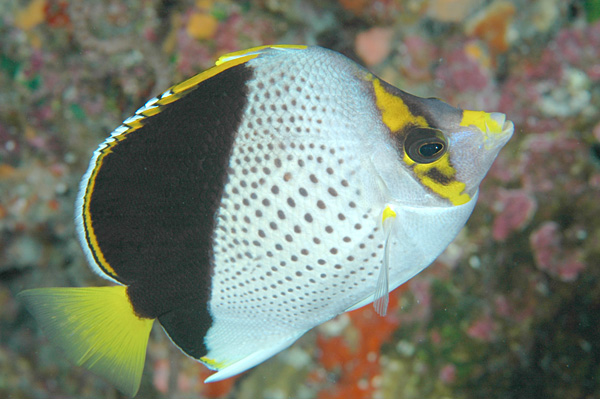

Conservation status
- Least Concern (IUCN 3.1)

Scientific classification
- Kingdom: Animalia
- Phylum: Chordata
- Class: Actinopterygii
- Order: Acanthuriformes
- Family: Chaetodontidae
- Genus: Chaetodon
- Species: C. C. tinkeri

Binomial name
- Chaetodon C. tinkeri L. P. Schultz, 1951

= Hawaiian butterflyfish =

Species of fish

The Hawaiian butterflyfish (Chaetodon tinkeri), also known as Tinker's butterflyfish, is a marine ray-finned fish, a butterflyfish belonging to the family Chaetodontidae of order Perciformes. It is found in the central Pacific Ocean.

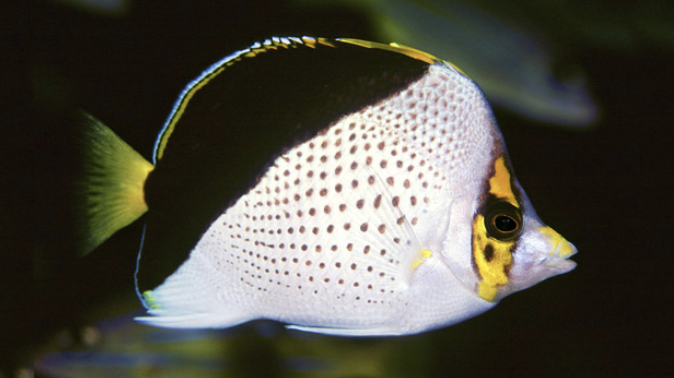
Photograph of the Hawaiian Butterflyfish showing its coloration

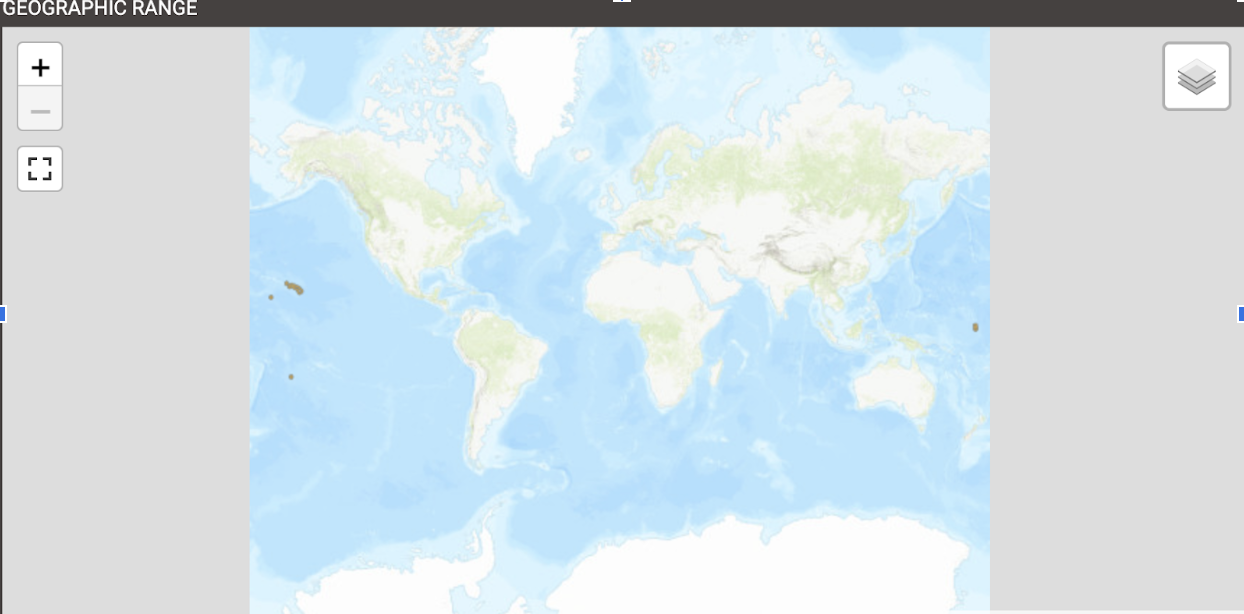
Map of the global range of the Hawaiian Butterflyfish, with known ranges marked by gray dots

== Description ==
The Hawaiian (Tinkers) butterflyfish display the morphological features that are shared by all butterflyfish species including a compressed oval body shape with small eyes located above the longitudinal axis of the fish. This species also has a single dorsal fin that is continuous and smooth which contains 13-14 dorsal spines and 18-22 dorsal rays. They have a single anal fin which contains 3 spines and 16-17 soft rays. They have a truncated caudal fin and paired pectoral fins on either side of their body. The exact coloring of the Hawaiian butterflyfish is how it may be distinguished from other similar species such as the Chaetodon flavocoronatus and Chaetodon burgessi. Specifically, naturalists will use a dichotomous key to match the exact markings with the species of butterflyfish. The Hawaiian butterflyfish has a relatively straight, sharp colour demarcation extending diagonally from near the start of the dorsal fin diagonally down to the middle of the anal fin. The section of the fish ventral to the split is white with dark or black spots and dorsally to the split is black. The Hawaiian butterflyfish also has a yellow caudal fin and a yellow stripe down its face. This yellow stripe is often used by naturalists as the distinguishing trait to recognize a Hawaiian butterflyfish. Adults may range in size from approximately 10–15 cm. The juveniles have the same coloring as adults, but start out smaller before growing to adult size.

== Distribution ==
The Hawaiian butterflyfish is found only in Marine coral reef ecosystems in a few areas of the world. They were long believed to be endemic to the Hawaiian islands but have more recently been discovered in the Johnston and Marshall islands in the South Pacific. This small range of areas where they can be found means that they are relatively rare. As well they only exist in relatively deep reefs in the vicinity of steep slopes from 27–80 meters deep. This differs from many other fish in the butterflyfish family, who occupy coral reefs at much shallower depths and is considered a key characteristic that sets the Hawaiian butterflyfish apart from other species. Living at such depths may come from their mutualistic relationship with Black coral which tends to live at depths of at least 60 meters deep. Although the exact nature of this symbiosis is unknown, the Hawaiian butterflyfish are strongly associated with black coral and seem to be found largely in territories which contain Black coral structures. The exact abundance of Hawaiian butterflyfish within their range is largely unknown. The average depth that these fish occur is deeper than is easily accessible by naturalists and recreational divers using SCUBA gear. They are considered a rare sighting for SCUBA divers, however this is not an accurate indicator of whether they are occurring rarely and more likely an indicator that they are not found at depths where they are easily spotted.

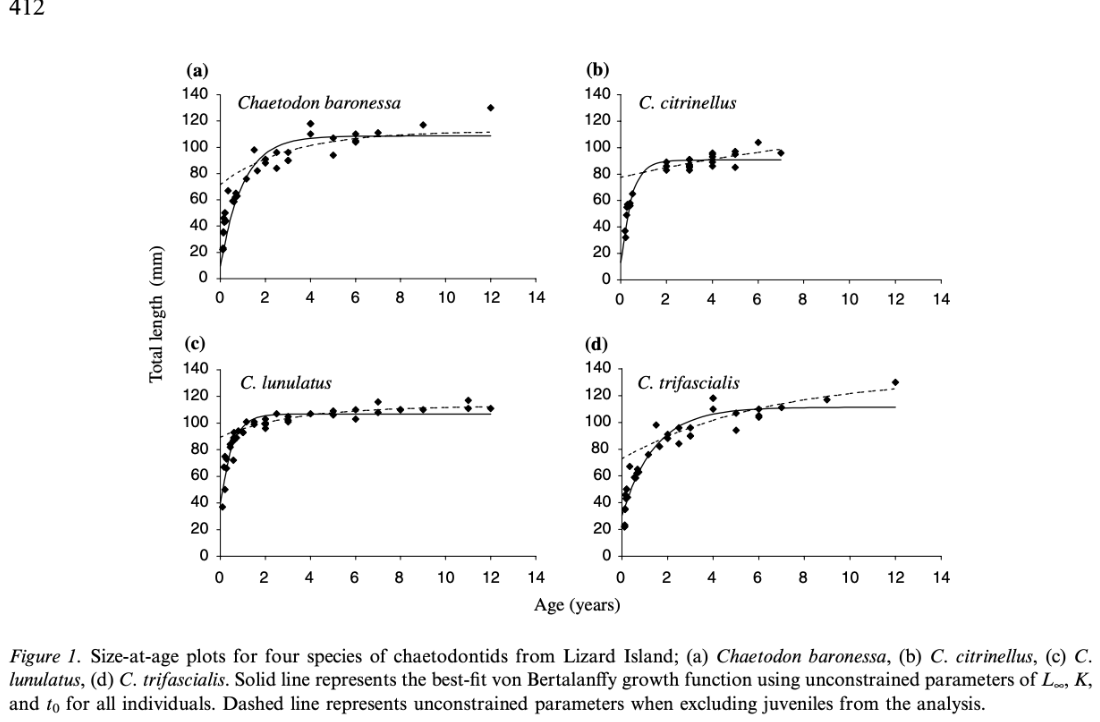
Growth chart for several butterflyfish species comparing age and total length, illustrating that the majority of growth takes place in the first 2 years of life

== Biology and Life History ==
Hawaiian butterfly fish form monogamous pairings during breeding and are found in these pairs for much of their life history and often for life. They reproduce through external fertilization of eggs between a monogamous pair and do not provide parental care. Hawaiian butterflyfish feed on a variety of benthic and planktonic organisms in their environment, this includes but is not limited to coral polyps, worms, plankton, and other invertebrates. Due to the relatively rare nature of this species it is difficult to tell if they are territorial in nature, however based upon studies on other butterflyfish species it is common for mating pairs to have a section of coral as their territory which they defend together for exclusive access to food and shelter in that area. It has been found that defending territory as a pair is more efficient than as an individual and may be the reason for forming these monogamous pairings. However, there has been little evidence of butterflyfish using aggression of any type to defend their territory, so it is possible that these home ranges should not be classified as territories. Similarly, there have been no studies on the exact age structures of the Hawaiian Butterflyfish, however other butterflyfish have been shown to grow in a relatively logarithmic fashion with rapid initial growth, reaching about 92% of their full size in their first two years of life. A butterflyfish’s age is difficult to estimate however, you can match the size of the butterflyfish in comparison to their fully grown size to get a rough estimation of the age of a juvenile.

== Conservation Status ==
The Hawaiian Butterflyfish has been listed as a “least concern” species by the IUCN redlist, however there are still several anthropogenic stressors that could lead to concern for this species. The first, and most well documented stressor on the Hawaiian butterflyfish is the collection of the fish for the aquarium industry. Although the Hawaiian butterfly fish live in much deeper parts of the ocean than many aquarium species, collectors have been known to use hand nets and SCUBA gear to gather them for retail across Hawaii and the Marshall islands. Due to their relative rarity and the difficulty of collecting them, they are a prized species for aquarists and sell on the United States mainland for an average of $699 per individual. There is no fishery for this species so their only collection by humans is done from the wild population. The second major threat to the Hawaiian butterflyfish comes as a result of their symbiotic relationship with Black coral. Black coral in Hawaii has been faced with invasion by Snowflake Coral (Carijoa riisei), an introduced species to the Hawaiian islands. The full effect of this invasive species is not yet known but it has been known to create dead zones of black coral and may threaten its wider existence on the Hawaiian islands. This may have a devastating effect on the Hawaiian butterflyfish population because there is a notable connection between the two species, though the exact nature of this symbiosis is unknown.
