= TheBus (Honolulu) =

Public bus transportation service on the island of Oʻahu, Hawaii

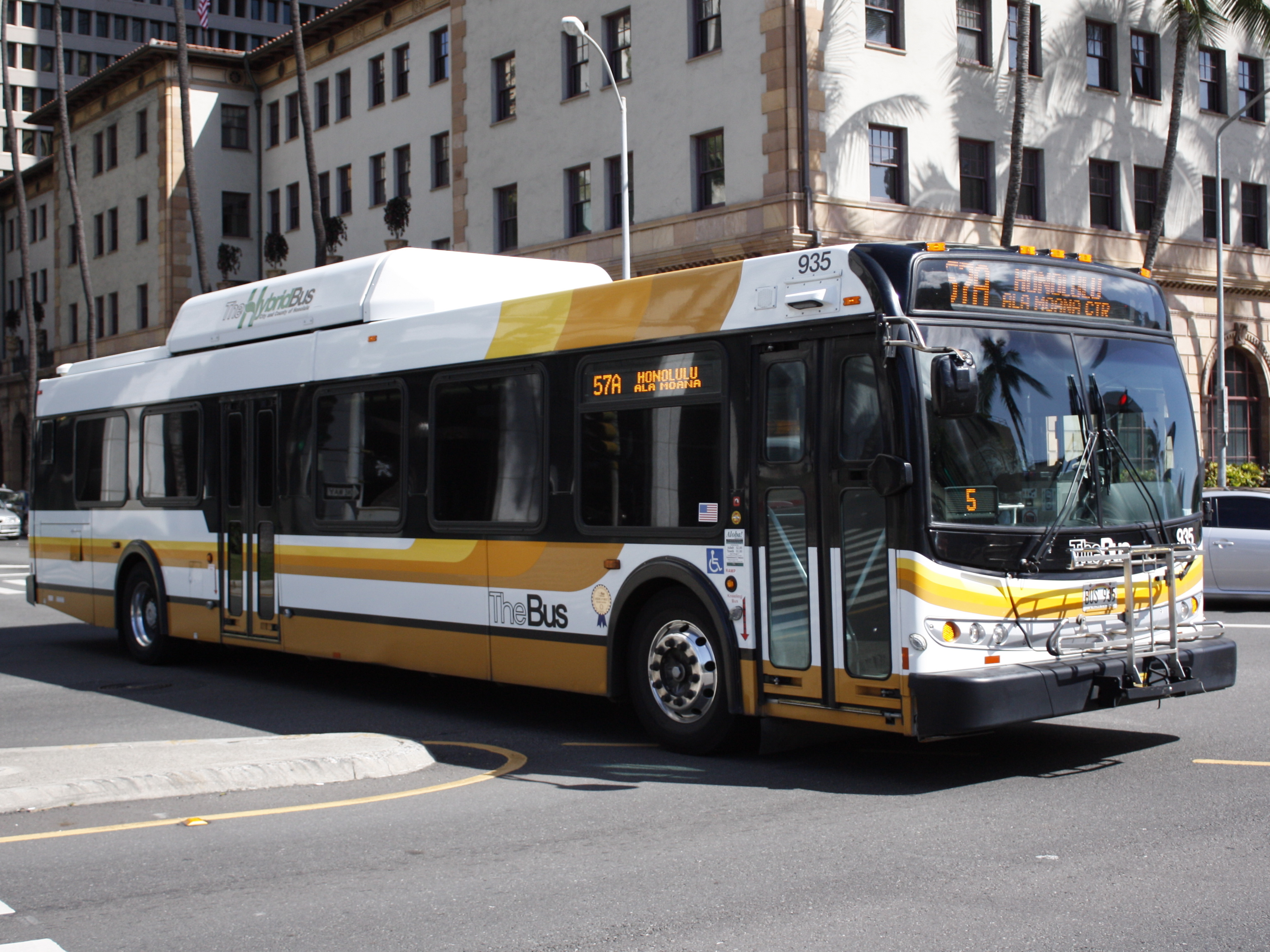
- Common TheBus livery
- Parent: City and County of Honolulu Department of Transportation Services
- Founded: 1971
- Service area: Honolulu County, Hawaiʻi
- Service type: Public transportation
- Routes: 115 (2024)
- Stops: 4,200
- Hubs: 10
- Fleet: 518 buses 207 paratransit vans (2022)
- Daily ridership: 142,200 (weekdays, Q1 2026)
- Annual ridership: 43,655,700 (2025)
- Fuel type: Diesel, Diesel-electric hybrid, Battery electric
- Operator: Oahu Transit Services, Inc.
- President and General Manager: Robert Yu
- Website: www.thebus.org

TheBus is the public bus transportation service on the island of Oʻahu, Hawai'i, in the United States. In 2025, TheBus had a ridership of 43,655,700, or about 142,200 per weekday, and its fleet comprised 518 buses and 207 paratransit vehicles. As of June 2024, these vehicles provide daily service on 115 routes, including three rapid transit routes and two limited express routes. TheBus is privately managed by the nonprofit Oahu Transit Services Inc., which operates the system under a public-private partnership with the City and County of Honolulu's Department of Transportation Services.

As of December 2017, TheBus is the nation's most heavily used public transportation system per capita among major cities.

== History ==
=== Origins: Honolulu Rapid Transit ===
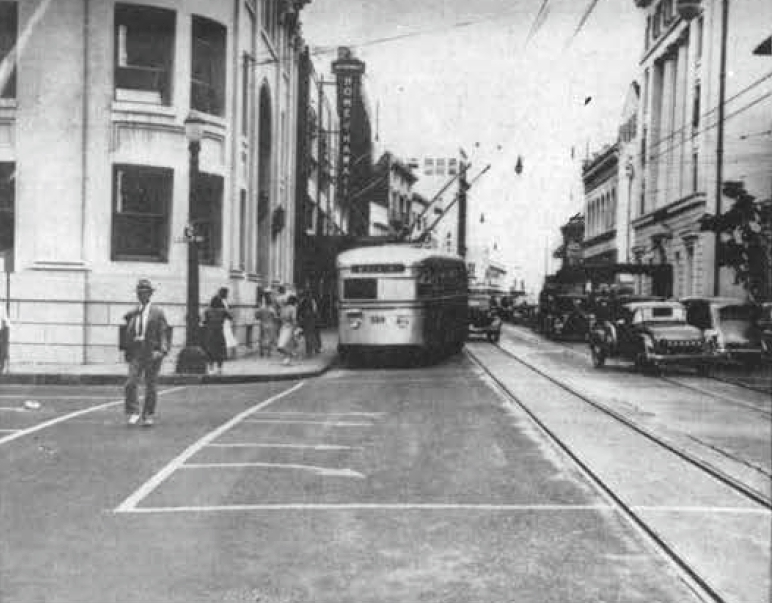
An HRT trolley bus in 1944

TheBus' origin was the Honolulu Rapid Transit and Land Company, which operated buses and trolley lines mostly in the city of Honolulu, while most outlying areas were serviced by competing bus companies. Honolulu Rapid Transit (HRT) was founded on June 6, 1898, the same day that Hawaiʻi was annexed by the United States. HRT started streetcar operations in Honolulu in 1901. HRT operated streetcars from 1901 to 1941, motor buses from 1915 onward, and trolleybuses from 1937 to 1957.

Various issues caused its failure, including a series of strikes by union workers and reports of a hostile takeover of the company by Harry Weinberg in 1955, after he began buying up other properties in Hawaiʻi. Weinberg acquired HRT from the Castle family in 1959.

=== Public acquisition ===
By the 1960s, HRT was associated with prolonged labor strikes that at times left passengers without bus service for more than 60 days, including a 67-day strike in 1967 and a 60-day strike in 1971. The City & County of Honolulu considered acquiring HRT and its competitors, keeping with the trend as more cities in the United States were taking over operations of privately owned bus companies; the United States Department of Transportation informed Honolulu in August 1970 that it would fund 2/3 of the cost to acquire three private lines: HRT, Leeward Bus, and Wahiawa Transport. On September 14, 1970, and under the guidance of then-Mayor of Honolulu Frank Fasi, the city established Mass Transit Lines (MTL) Limited to oversee operations. After careful negotiations the city agreed to purchase HRT (and its competitors serving the other portions of O'ahu) for a $2 million down payment and an additional $1 million to buy new buses.

Fasi later went to Dallas, Texas and bought 50 ex-Dallas Transit System air-conditioned GM New Look buses (model TDH5303, built in 1964), followed by adding 17 new New Looks (T6H5305A 500-509 and T6M5305A 600-606) from GM's Pontiac, Michigan plant. The 50 ex-Dallas buses were renumbered 550-599 and retained their original Dallas livery. Since the original Dallas colors were similar to the old HRT colors, the ex-Dallas buses did not look totally out of place; however, they were eventually repainted to match the new paint scheme. The ex-Dallas buses were all retired by 1987, but some were purchased by and served for private lines until 1993.

On February 25, 1971, the city council officially approved a contract for MTL to take over operations. Several days later, on March 1, HRT was renamed TheBus. In addition to changing the paint scheme, MTL made the system friendlier by also relaxing the standard uniform, introducing the current short-sleeve shirts featuring TheBus logo, buses, and slogans. Fasi introduced the "new-identity apparel" in 1974, hoping to change the bus system's stodgy, old image to a fresher, more fun one that would help lure more drivers out of their cars. These uniforms, which are updated every 2–3 years, have become collector's items.

MTL was dissolved in 1992 after the city switched bus system administration to Oahu Transit Services. The success of TheBus and its business model has been well received by residents, tourists and the transit industry. Ridership for TheBus has grown from 30 million passengers per year to approximately 71 million. TheBus is now the 20th most utilized transit system in the country, the 13th most utilized bus fleet, and the sixth highest transit ridership in the country per-capita. TheBus also has the lowest cost per passenger mile of any system and one of the lowest cost per boarding passengers in the industry.

=== Strikes and ridership ===
Despite its success, TheBus also had its share of setbacks. In August 2003, a strike by union workers left Honolulu without bus service for nearly a month. This move and its settlement the following September coincided with the City Council approving a fare increase to $2 and other increases in rates and pass fees, in part to fund the city's promise to the Teamsters not to cut service and employees. By 2006, ridership and profits rebounded thanks to the implementation of programs geared toward college students who commute to school and work, and rising gas prices.

In 2009, ridership for TheBus dipped slightly by 2% due to its July 2009 decision to increase its fares to $2.25, lower gas prices, and a rising unemployment rate. Overall, Honolulu has had relatively high bus ridership. In 2008, 5.6 percent of Hawaiʻi commuters used public transportation, while 66.8 percent drove to work alone, according to U.S. Census Bureau figures.

On September 29, 2009, Oahu Transit Services and the City & County of Honolulu announced plans to build an intermodal transit center that will be located at TheBus' facilities at Middle Street. The $8.2 million project, called The Middle Street Intermodal Center, whose location will take up a large portion of the Middle Street-Kamehameha Highway intersection, was scheduled to open in October 2010, but was delayed until November 14, 2011, when the terminal opened. The newly expanded facility incorporates TheBus, TheHandi-Van, bicycles, cars, walking, and the Skyline light metro line, including a pedestrian bridge and walkway for passengers who want to make connections to the rail line's Middle Street station from the transit center. In addition, the center will also have a 1000-car parking facility, an enclosed transit layover bay for waiting passengers, an electronic information billboard, a customer service center, two restroom buildings, a utility building, and security office.

=== Safety and service improvements ===
In May 2010, TheBus began additional changes in order to improve service system-wide. One major change included the installation of security cameras in its fleet in an effort to deter criminal activity. It also installed a GPS system known as "HEA" (short for 'Honolulu Estimated Arrival', while also evoking the Hawaiian word hea meaning "where?") in the majority of vehicles, and set up a website at hea.thebus.org enabling passengers waiting at stops to track bus locations via cell phone.

== Operations ==
=== Buses ===
As of July 2023, TheBus operates service on 117 routes, including three express routes and two limited stop routes.

=== TheHandi-Van ===
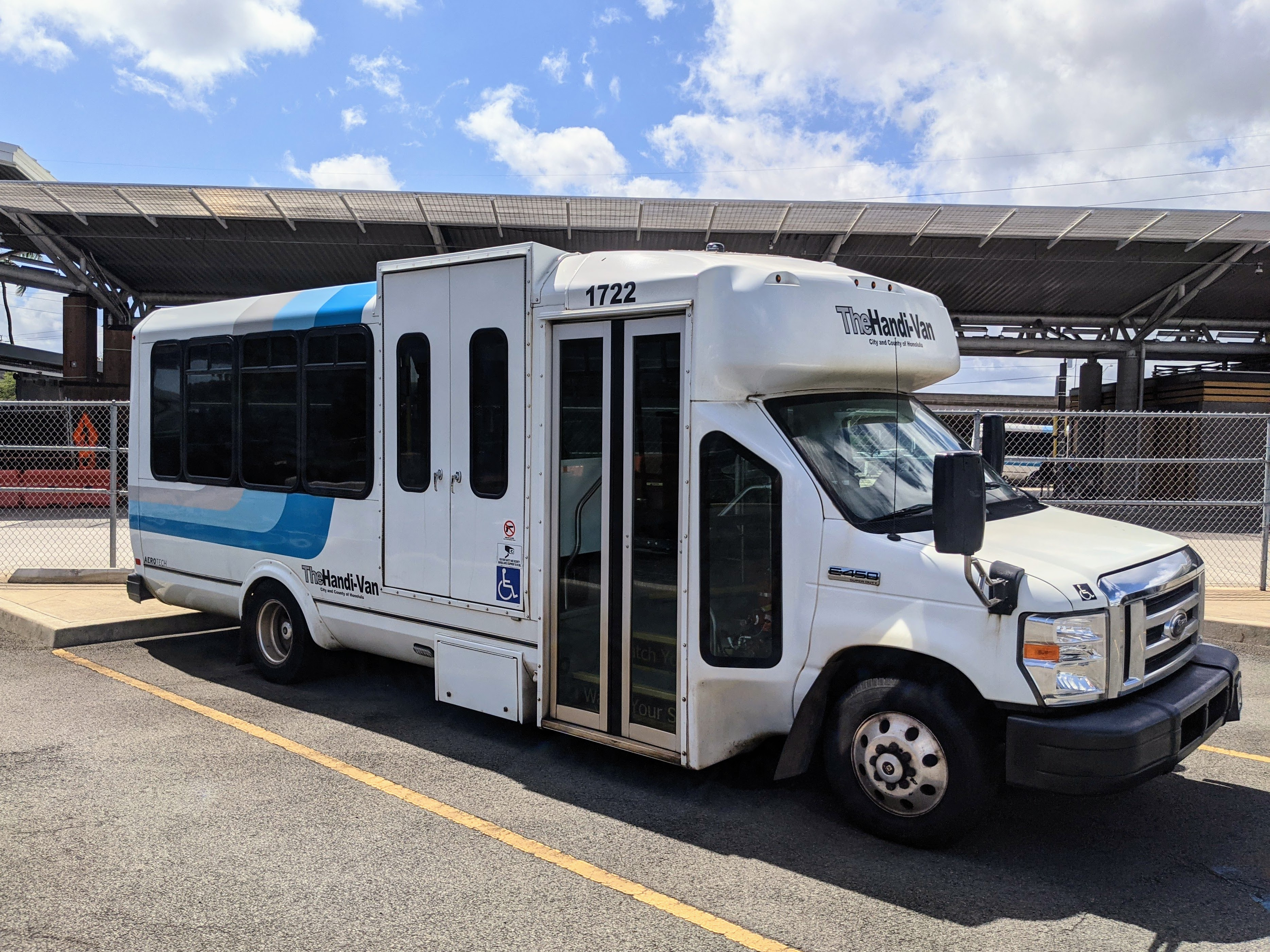
TheHandi-Van vehicle parked at Kalihi Transit Center

TheHandi-Van is the paratransit supplement to TheBus which provides shared-ride services to disabled passengers unable to use standard public transportation or fixed route service. Registration is required, and each ride must be reserved in advance. The fleet includes 207 vehicles which operate during the same days and hours as TheBus. TheHandi-Van serves over 3,000 daily riders (with approximately 13,000 eligible total), operates year-round and 24 hours per day, and is the most in-demand paratransit service per capita in the nation. Rides are able to be requested from any area located within 3/4 of a mile of any bus route, and are available to disabled visitors along with residents.

== Fares ==
Fares can be paid using a HOLO smart card or cash. As of July 2022, one-way adult trip costs $3, with a daily fare cap of $7.50. A one-way youth fare is $1.50, with one-way disability, senior, low income, and Medicare fares set at $1.25. Prior to July 1, 2021, paper passes were also accepted. Upon tapping a HOLO card to a reader, passengers receive an unlimited number of free transfers for 2.5 hours, including onto Skyline trains.

As of August 2023, TheBus is free to all public high school students.

== Advertising ==
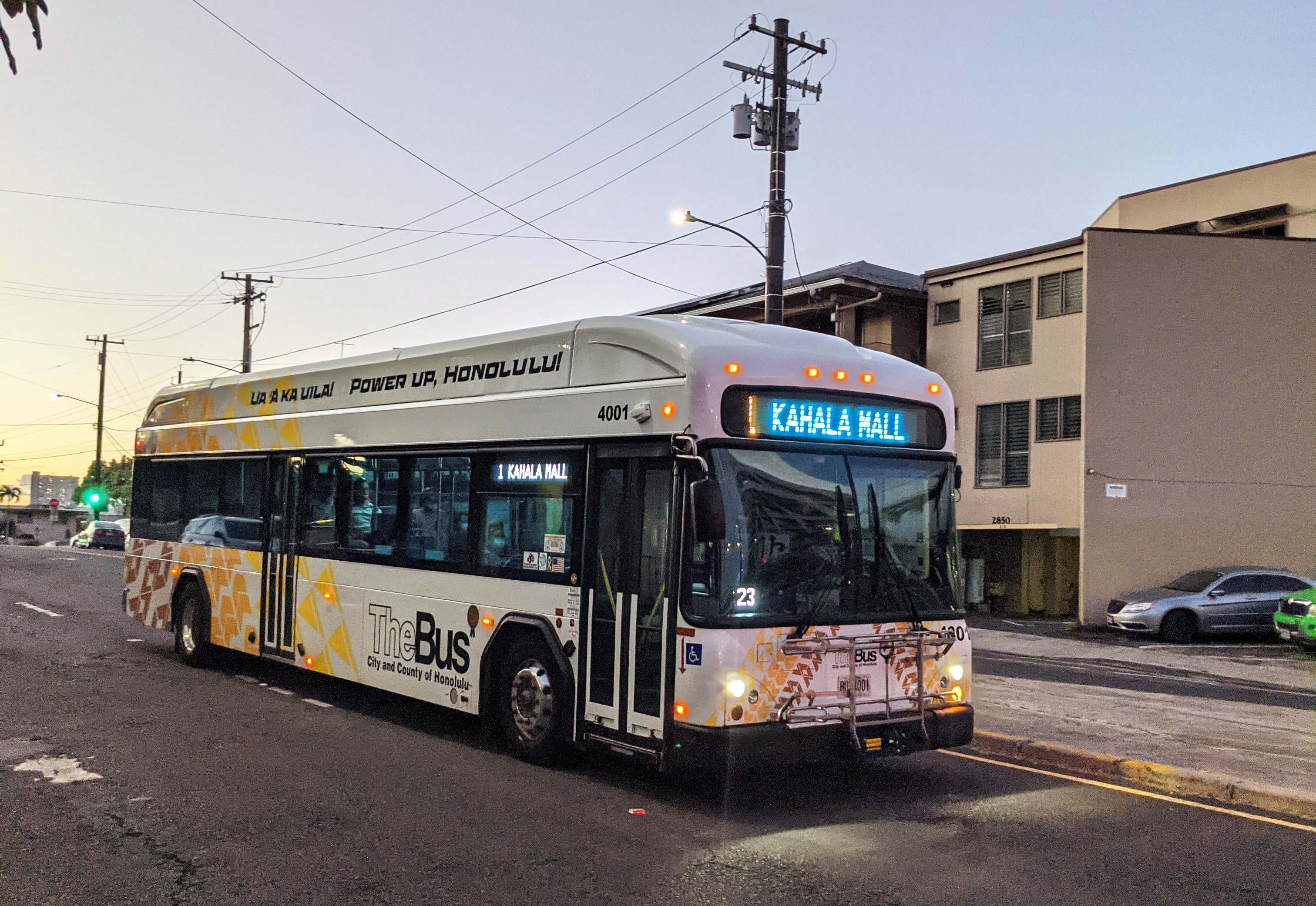
An electric TheBus on King Street in Mōʻiliʻili. The Hawaiian phrase on its side references a mele written to commemorate the electrification of Kāneʻohe.

Prior to the City & County taking over the HRT in 1971, outdoor advertising was allowed on the exterior of the buses. However, since the transfer of ownership the advertising has been restricted to the interior of the fleet, even though there was never a restriction or ban on placing ads on the exterior of the buses, a move that The Outdoor Circle (a group that is opposed to outdoor advertising in Hawaiʻi) actively supports. On December 4, 2013, Mayor Kirk Caldwell announced a plan to place ads on the outside of the buses (but not at stops or in shelters, as these would be prohibited locations per a ban on non-moving outdoor advertising in the state) in an effort to generate money to fund more revenue, restore cut routes, prevent fare increases, and improve the system's infrastructure. However, the associated bill was deferred, and alternative funding for TheBus was later passed by City Council. The bill failed to pass the required three readings within two years of introduction and was filed.

== Fleet ==
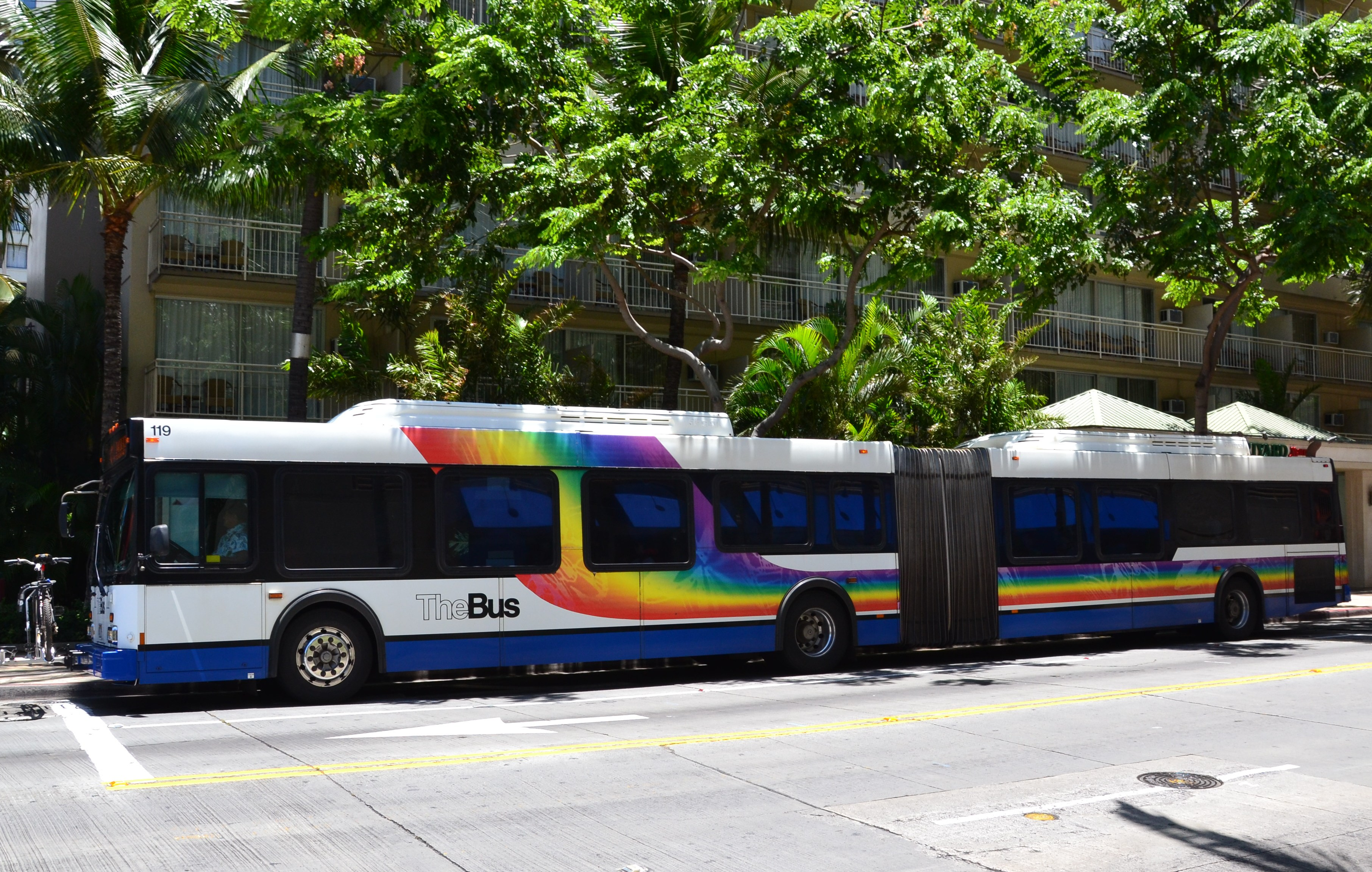
An articulated TheBus on Kūhiō Avenue in Waikīkī, with a bicycle on the front rack

As of February 2022, there are 518 buses in the fleet, 17 of which are electric vehicles. This number decreased from fiscal year 2015–16, during which the fleet comprised 542 buses, including 115 articulated buses, 389 40-foot buses, and 39 buses that were less than 40 feet in length, with an average overall fleet age of 9.5 years for all buses in service at the time. All buses are equipped with bike racks. The first battery-powered electric TheBus vehicle was unveiled in December 2020 after a six-week pilot period in 2018. As of 2013, 15.4% of the fleet were hybrid models.

All buses in TheBus fleet have Hawaiʻi State license plate numbers matching the assigned bus fleet number and beginning with the letters "BUS", and are equipped with automatic stop annunciators. The announcement system voice is provided by songwriter, translator, and Hawaiian language scholar Puakea Nogelmeier, who professionally recorded nearly 6,000 phrases for the system in 2003. During the recording process, Nogelmeier researched each Hawaiian place name to ensure the most accurate pronunciation, and his voice has helped to standardize how people pronounce these names. Due to the naturally deep tone of his voice, it is digitally pitched up a half-step.

== Reception and ridership ==
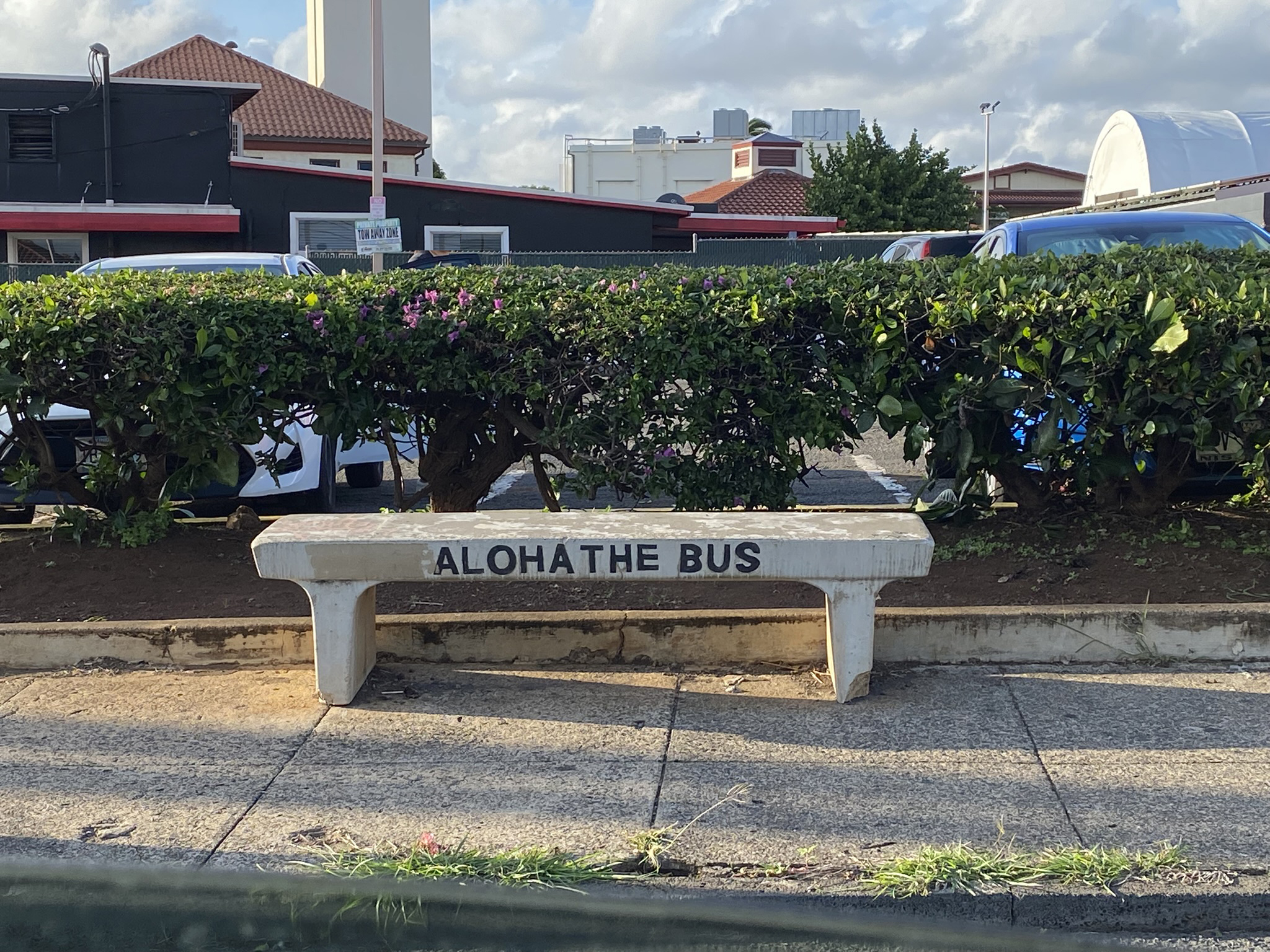
TheBus bench at Kalihi St and N. King St

Due to its low cost and wide coverage, TheBus is a very popular means of travel by high school students. The fact that free school bus routes are not provided for the majority of Honolulu's students, as they are in many other parts in the United States, also contributes to high usage of TheBus among high school students. Because of this popularity, and the fact it was developed during Fasi's tenure as mayor of Honolulu, it received the nickname "Uncle Fasi's Limousine Service," also known as "Uncle Fasi's" or "Fasi's Limo." Students at the University of Hawaiʻi at Mānoa and community colleges who have paid semesterly fees also receive an unlimited bus pass via the college "U-PASS" system.

In July 2023, the Hawaiʻi State Department of Education announced the EXPRESS program, providing free public transit to all public high school students (grades 9–12) across the state – including via TheBus and Skyline on Oʻahu – beginning in the 2023–24 school year.

TheBus has been criticized by local publications such as Honolulu Civil Beat for "heading in the wrong direction", citing both rising fares yet a steady decline in ridership since 2015 despite increasing traffic on the island. In July 2022, ridership numbers had only recovered to 60% of their pre-COVID-19 pandemic levels. In an effort to boost ridership, a fare-free week was piloted in August of the same year, which resulted in a 12% ridership increase and an additional 20,000 rides, well surpassing predictions of a 10% increase. Another fare-free period for all transit on Oʻahu was held to coincide with the launch of Skyline rail service in July 2023.

As of December 2022, over 75% of regular TheBus riders are low-income and nearly 90% earn below Oʻahu's average median income. Proponents of free public transport have citied these reasons, among others such as climate change, as reasons for TheBus to adopt a fare-free policy, which would mirror that of the Big Island of Hawaiʻi's Hele-On bus system.

=== "America's Best Transit System" ===
Since its inception, TheBus has been recognized twice by the American Public Transportation Association as America's Best Transit System for 1994–1995 and 2000–2001.

== See also ==
- Wiki Wiki Shuttle – Free shuttle bus service at Honolulu International Airport
