= Falls of Halladale =

Scottish 4-masted iron-hulled barque

Coordinates: 38.6082°S 142.8571°E

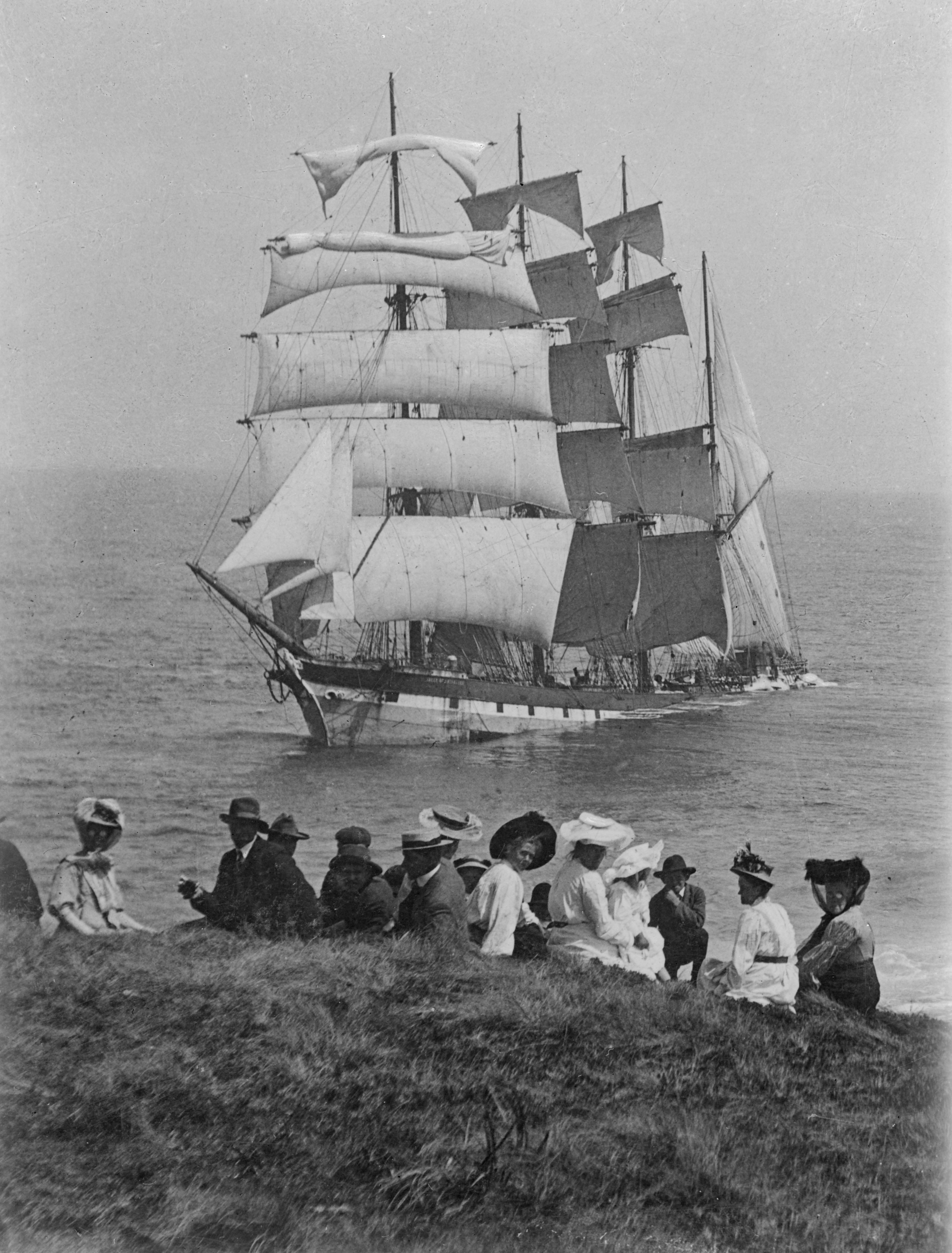
- The Falls of Halladale, aground near Peterborough, Victoria

History

United Kingdom
- Name: Falls of Halladale
- Owner: Wright, Breakenridge & Co., Glasgow
- Operator: Falls Line
- Builder: Russell and Company, Greenock
- Yard number: 130
- Launched: 21 July 1886
- Completed: 9 August 1886
- Identification: Official No.93300
- Fate: Wrecked, 14 November 1908

General characteristics
- Type: Windjammer
- Tonnage: 2,085 GRT; 2,026 NRT
- Length: 275.2 ft (83.9 m)
- Beam: 41.6 ft (12.7 m)
- Depth of hold: 23.9 ft (7.3 m)
- Sail plan: 4-masted barque
- Crew: 29

Falls of Halladale was a four-masted iron-hulled barque, built at Greenock in Scotland in 1886 for the Falls Line of Glasgow. She was operated in the long-distance trading of bulk cargos. On 14 November 1908, she was wrecked on the Australian coast near Peterborough, Victoria, due to the negligence of the captain.

== Design and Construction ==
The barque Falls of Halladale was built in 1886. She was named after waterfalls on the Halladale River in the historic Scottish county of Sutherland. Her length was 275.2 ft (83.9 m), breadth 41.6 ft (12.7 m) and depth of hold 23.9 ft (7.3 m), and she measured 2,085 GRT and 2,026 NRT. She was built for the Falls Line (Wright, Breakenridge & Co., Glasgow, Scotland), at the shipyard of Russell & Co., at Greenock on the River Clyde, at Yard No.130. The ship's design was advanced for her time, incorporating features that improved crew safety and efficiency, such as elevated bridges to allow the crew to move forward and aft in relative safety during heavy seas.

Falls of Halladale was the seventh vessel in a series of eight similar iron-hulled sailing ships, all built by Russell & Co, and all named after waterfalls in Scotland. Falls of Halladale was preceded by Falls of Clyde (1878), Falls of Bruar (1879), Falls of Dee (1882), Falls of Afton (1882), Falls of Foyers (1883) and Falls of Earn (1884), and was followed by a sister ship, Falls of Garry (1886). Falls of Clyde is preserved as a museum ship at Pier 7 in the Port of Honolulu and, as of 2023, remains there afloat, but is in a deteriorated condition and is not open to the public.

Falls of Halladale was launched on 21 July 1886, and registered at Glasgow on 9 August, with British Official Number 93300.

== Wreck ==
Falls of Halladale is best known for her spectacular demise in a shipwreck near Peterborough, Victoria on the shipwreck coast of Victoria, Australia. On the night of 14 November 1908, in dense fog, she was sailed directly onto rocks due to a navigational error. The crew of 29 abandoned ship safely and all made it ashore by boat, leaving the ship foundering with her sails still set. For weeks after the wreck, large crowds gathered to view the ship as she gradually broke up and sank in the shallow water.

Soon after the accident, the ship's master, Captain David Wood Thomson, was brought before a Court of Marine Inquiry in Melbourne. He was found guilty of a gross act of misconduct, having carelessly navigated the ship, neglected to take proper soundings, and failed to place the ship on a port tack before it became too late to avoid the shipwreck. Captain Thomson's punishment included a small fine and a six-month suspension of his Certificate of Competency as a Master.

Today, the remains of Falls of Halladale are a popular destination for recreational divers. The wreck is easily accessible by scuba divers, about 300 m offshore in 3 to 15 m of water. The hull lies on its collapsed starboard side. Some of the original cargo of 56,763 roof slates remains at the site of the wreck, along with corroded masses of what used to be coils of barbed wire. Twenty-two thousand slates were salvaged in the 1980s and used to provide roofing at the Flagstaff Hill Maritime Village in Warrnambool. One of her anchors was recovered in 1974 and is on display at the village. The wreck is a legally protected Historic Shipwreck.

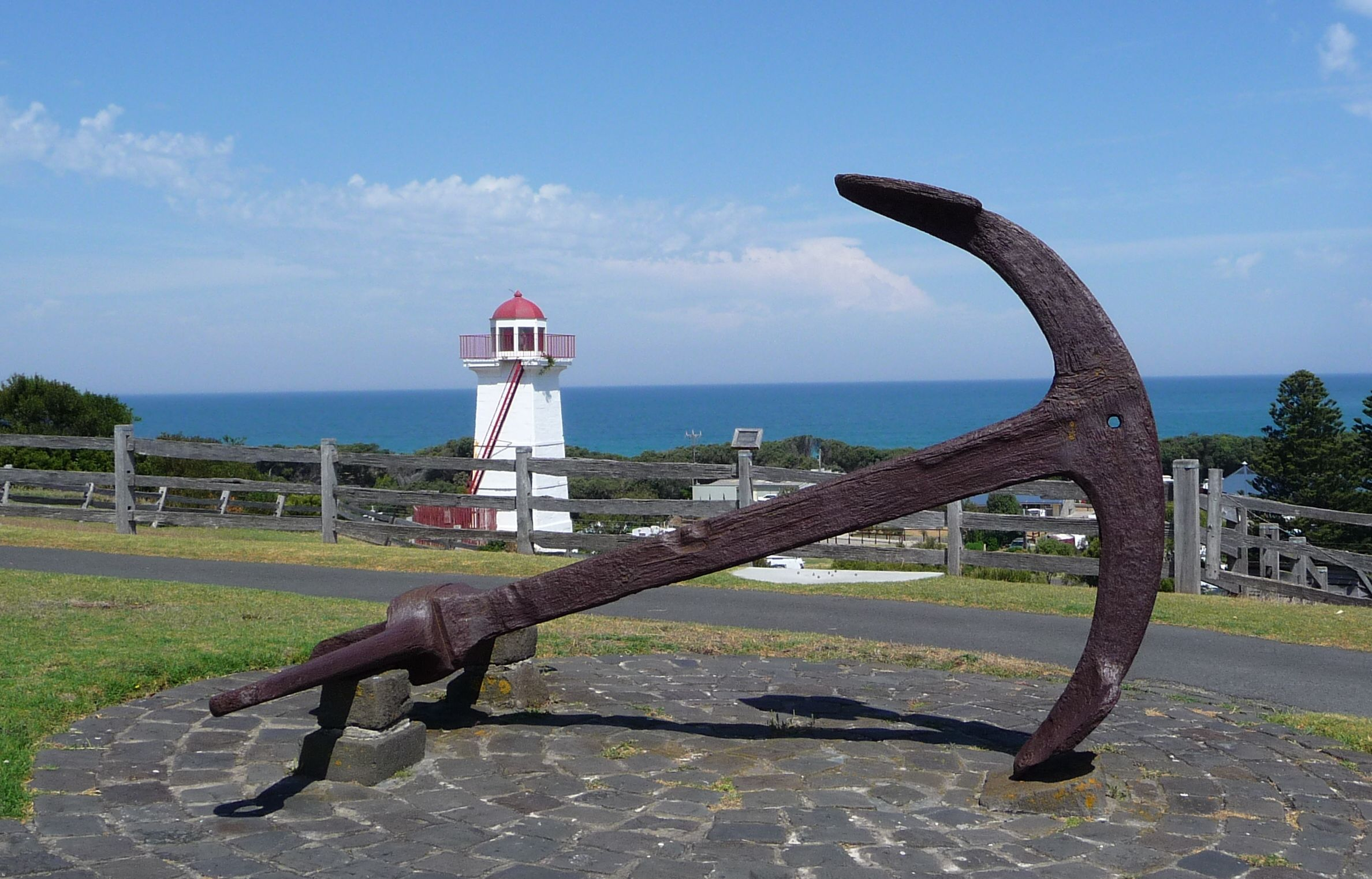
Anchor from the Falls of Halladale, Flagstaff Hill Maritime Village, Warrnambool
