= Aloha Tower Marketplace =

Mixed-use in Honolulu, Hawaii, U.S.

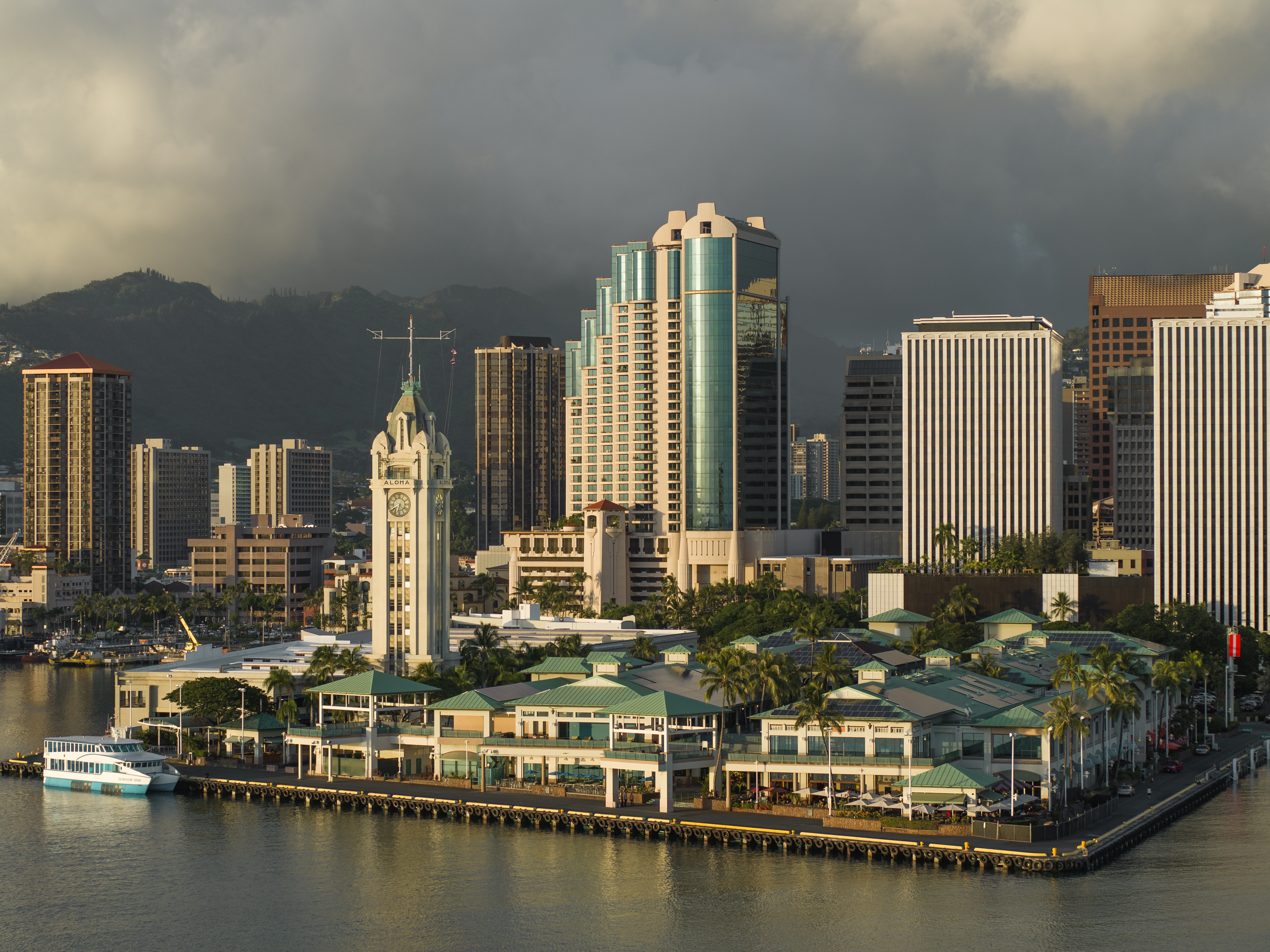
- Aerial view of the complex, also featuring the Aloha Tower itself on the middle left (May 2021)

General information
- Status: Operational (defunct as a festival marketplace)
- Type: Festival marketplace (1994–2014); Mixed-use (2015–present)
- Location: Honolulu, Hawaii, United States, 1 Aloha Tower Drive, 96813
- Coordinates: 21°18.456′N 157°51.908′W
- Opening: November 19, 1994; 31 years ago
- Renovated: 2012–2015
- Closed: March 2014; 12 years ago (as a festival marketplace)
- Owner: Hawaii Pacific University
- Operator: Hawaii Lifestyle Retail Properties, LLC

Technical details
- Floor count: 2

Design and construction
- Architects: D'Agostino, Izzo & Quirk Architects, Inc. (D'AIQ)
- Developer: Aloha Tower Associates

Renovating team
- Renovating firm: Hawaii Pacific University

Other information
- Number of stores: 7 (128 at peak)

Website
- alohatower.com

The Aloha Tower Marketplace is an open-air mixed-use complex in downtown Honolulu, Hawaii, serving as the main campus for Hawaii Pacific University (HPU). It opened in late 1994 as a festival marketplace, which has completely failed financially due to several bankruptcies and a shift in the tenant mix. Located at the Honolulu Harbor, the Aloha Tower Marketplace includes several national historic landmarks including the Aloha Tower (hence the name "Aloha Tower" Marketplace), Falls of Clyde and Hawaiʻi Maritime Center.

== History ==
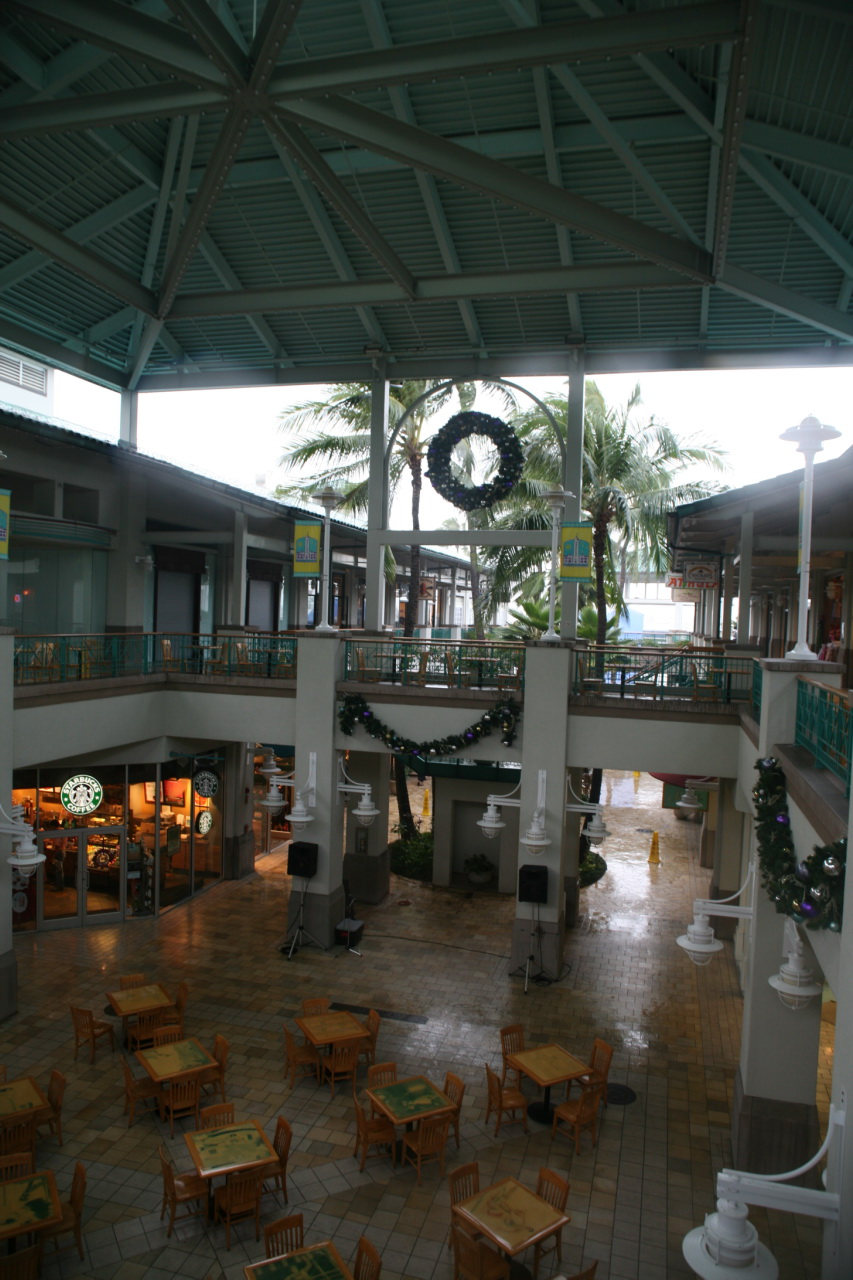
Interior view (December 2007)

=== 1983–1994: Development and opening ===
Governor George Ariyoshi first proposed a revitalization of the Honolulu waterfront to replace industrial harbor activities with a world trade center and public spaces. The Hawaii State Legislature created the Aloha Tower Development Corporation (ATDC). This state agency was tasked with overseeing the redevelopment of a 13-acre (5.3 ha) site between Piers 8 and 11 to strengthen international trade and beautify the area.

Before the 1994 project succeeded, two other developers were selected but ultimately failed to proceed. Southern Pacific Development Co. was hired as the developer in 1983, but withdrew from the project in 1984. Honolulu Waterfront Limited Partnership was selected in 1986, but involvement ended in litigation with the state. In 1989, the ATDC selected Aloha Tower Associates, a partnership that included James W. Rouse's Enterprise Development Company (EDC), the for-profit subsidiary of the non-profit Enterprise Foundation, along with local firms, for a massive $544 million project, funded by locals and licensed by the Columbia, Maryland-based Rouse Company. The original plan included two luxury condominium towers, an office tower, a 350-room hotel, a new cruise ship terminal, and 2,000 underground parking stalls.

However, by 1992, the developers faced financial difficulties and requested to build in phases. Defunct warehouses and buildings at Piers 8 and 9 were torn down to make way for the new structures. The project was redesigned as a festival marketplace, a concept pioneered by James Rouse. This style utilized green tile roofs, stucco arches, and open-air lanais to create a festive, pedestrian-friendly atmosphere, similar to Harborplace in Baltimore, and Faneuil Hall Marketplace in Boston, Massachusetts.

However, only the retail marketplace portion was completed. The intended office towers, hotel, and extensive underground parking were never built, a factor many experts believe contributed to the marketplace's future financial struggles. Aloha Tower Marketplace was completed on November 19, 1994 as part of a Honolulu Harbor commercial revitalization project, featuring a grand opening gala performance by the legendary Motown group, the Four Tops. Original businesses were Hooters (the franchise's only location in Hawaii), Gordon Biersch Brewery Restaurant (Hawaii's very first on-site brewery restaurant), and Chai's Island Bistro; Award-winning Chef Chai Chaowasaree opened this high-end Pacific Rim fusion restaurant, which doubled as a massive hub for live contemporary Hawaiian music.

=== 1998–2009: Ownership changes and decline ===
Aloha Tower Marketplace was acquired by Aloha Tower LP, a subsidiary of Trinity Investment Trust LLC, in 1998.

In 2002, Aloha Tower LP filed for bankruptcy. It had been operating at a loss because of its distance from other tourist areas, lack of parking, and mismanagement. The bankruptcy led to the reorganization of shops in the marketplace.

The museum at the Falls of Clyde focused on historic sailing and Polynesian sailing customs. Occasionally, outrigger canoes were displayed at the Hawaii Maritime Center as well. Aloha Tower Marketplace was largely a dead mall by the mid-2000s, and the museum closed May 1, 2009, due to lack of revenue.

=== 2013–2018: Redevelopment ===
Hawaii Pacific University partnered with an unnamed developer to own the marketplace in 2011, and a few years later in 2013, they bought out the developer and took complete control of the facility. They renovated the shopping center into a mixed-use development with a small number of retail and restaurants, and most vacant storefronts were converted into HPU student dormitories. The redevelopment, which began in 2012 has been complicated by disputes between development entities, permitting issues and staff-reductions.

Barnes & Noble College agreed to operate a bookstore at the Aloha Tower Marketplace in July 2013, but could not open until HPU completed renovations. The project was nearly finished in the summer of 2015; it was expected to be completed in the fall of that year, and required the eviction of 17 businesses in February 2014, excluding Gordon Biersch Brewery Restaurant, Hooters, the Star of Honolulu dinner cruise office, and The Cab dispatch; however, in August of that year, Hooters filed a lawsuit against HPU, claiming that the university's massive, intrusive dorm construction created an active "war zone" of dust, blockades, and noise that completely choked out their customer access and destroyed their restaurant revenue.

On May 21, 2018, The Old Spaghetti Factory officially opened a massive waterfront location at the marketplace; it relocated to Aloha Tower after its historical Ward Warehouse home was completely demolished.

=== 2020–present ===
Hooters and Gordon Biersch Brewery Restaurant permanently closed in February 2020 due to severe underperformance. Hawaii Pacific University celebrated its 60th anniversary at Aloha Tower Marketplace in September 2025.

== See also ==
- University Pavilion – a similar festival marketplace developed by James W. Rouse that was converted into a multi-purpose facility
- The Pointe at Harbour Island in Tampa, Florida
