= Gleddoch House Hotel & Golf Club =

Estate in Langbank, Renfrewshire, Scotland

Coordinates: 55.9185°N 4.585°W

Gleddoch - Hotel, Spa & Golf
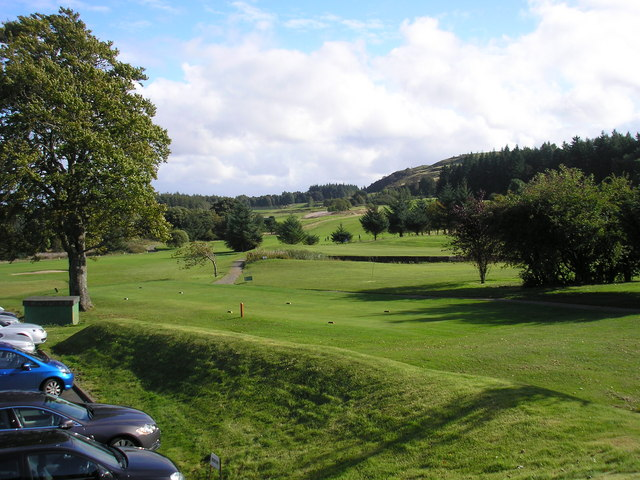
- Interactive map of Gleddoch - Hotel, Spa & Golf

Club information
- Location: Langbank
- Established: 1974
- Type: Private
- Owner: Independent
- Operator: Independent
- Tota holes: 18
- Tournaments: Ladies European Tour 1980
- Greens: Bentgrass
- Website: http://www.gleddoch.com/
- Designed by: James Hamilton Stutt
- Par: 71
- Length: 6283 yards

Gleddoch Golf & Spa Resort is situated in a 360-acre estate in Langbank, Renfrewshire.

== Hotel ==
Gleddoch House is a Victorian mansion built by Scottish industrialist Sir James Lithgow in the 1920s, and completed in 1926. It has further since opened as a 75 bedroom four star hotel, golf course, restaurant, spa, sports complex and wedding venue. The building has been category B listed since June 1971. The hotel was owned by Edinburgh based North British Trust Group Ltd until 2006, when it was sold to Kent based Swallow Hotels. Bespoke Hotels are the operators of the business. Colliers International were the selling agents that concluded the sale.

In 1975 after a year of rebuilding Gleddoch House was opened as a hotel by Lady Gwendoline Lithgow in August .The Hotel at the time was considered exceptionally luxurious and in 1977 won 'the Scottish Country House Hotel of the year award' also Guide Michelin awarded the Hotel a 3 red star country house award.

A large fire broke out at the building in January 2004. Fifty firefighters tackled the blaze. The fire destroyed the roof and some of the interior including 11 bedrooms, reception and some other public rooms.

The 2002 Champions League winners Real Madrid stayed at the hotel.

== Course ==
The course designer was James Hamilton Stutt. It was originally a 9-hole course which opened in 1974. It was then extended to 18 holes in 1975. The 9 extra holes are known as the 'top half' to course members. Brian Barnes played the first round at the official opening of the course. Severiano Ballesteros has also played at the course in 1985.

The course has hosted many county and regional events. In 1980 local woman Wilma Aitken won the Carlsberg Open on the Ladies European Tour at Gleddoch, becoming one of the few amateurs to do so. Discussions have been held with the PGA regarding Gleddoch becoming a course on the Tartan Tour.

== See also ==
- Golf in Scotland
- History of golf
- List of listed buildings in Renfrewshire
