= National Shipbuilders Security =

National Shipbuilders Security was a UK Government body established in 1930, under the Chairmanship of Sir James Lithgow, of the eponymous Clyde shipbuilding giant Lithgows. The remit of National Shipbuilders Security was to remove over-capacity from the British shipbuilding industry. Between 1930 and 1938 it bought numerous shipbuilders that were in economic difficulties. It closed and demolished most of the shipyards it bought, including William Beardmore and Company at Dalmuir on the River Clyde, Bow, McLachlan and Company in Paisley and Earle's Shipbuilding in Kingston upon Hull. It also bought and shut down the Palmers Shipbuilding and Iron Company and thereby caused much unemployment, which inspired the Jarrow March.
