= Sir William Lithgow, 2nd Baronet =

British baronet (1934–2022)

Sir William James Lithgow
- Born: 10 May 1934
- Died: 28 February 2022 (aged 87)
- Occupation: Industrialist

Sir William James Lithgow, 2nd Baronet (10 May 1934 – 28 February 2022) was a Scottish industrialist and vice-chairman of Lithgow Group. In 1952 he inherited the Scottish shipbuilding company, Lithgows, which was established by his grandfather, William Lithgow. Economic and political changes, especially the nationalisation of British shipbuilding in the 1970s, prevented Sir William from simply continuing the family business, and he therefore led it in new directions, including engineering, salmon farming and other marine and agricultural matters. He described himself as an "industrialist and farmer". Since 1999 his son James has been chairman of the Lithgow Group.

== Early life ==
Lithgow was the son of Sir James Lithgow, 1st Baronet, and Lady Lithgow, whose family homes were Gleddoch House, at Langbank on the Clyde, a few miles from their shipyards at Port Glasgow, and Ormsary, their country estate in Knapdale. He was educated at Winchester College, and was a Chartered Engineer and Fellow of the Royal Academy of Engineering. His father died when he was eighteen, and his mother acted as chairman of the family company until 1959. In 1967 he married Mary Claire Hill and they have a daughter and two sons.

== Change of direction ==
In the 1960s British shipbuilding was facing serious competition from the Far East, as well as other challenges. In the late 1960s a government enquiry into the UK shipbuilding industry led to a merger between Lithgows Ltd. and Scotts Shipbuilding & Engineering Co Ltd. of Greenock. This became Scott Lithgow Ltd. in 1970, but in 1977 the government nationalised the company under the control of the British Shipbuilders Corporation by the Aircraft and Shipbuilding Industries Act 1977.

Lithgow and others involved challenged the amount of compensation they were offered and ended up taking their case to the European Court of Human Rights. The press reported his views about the wider implications of his experience, which he related to the Thatcher government's privatisation policies, and the forthcoming expiry of the British lease on Hong Kong. When he finally lost his legal battle in 1986 he told The Times that his claim had started as a "squalid argument about money" but had come to be about "fundamental property rights which are part of the basis of the free world". On other occasions he has expressed strong views publicly on subjects ranging from the importance of wealth creation to weaknesses in ferry services to the Scottish islands.

== After nationalisation ==
Meanwhile, Lithgows was diversifying. In 1980 they moved into salmon farming through their subsidiary Landcatch. Their Campbeltown boatyard producing fishing vessels closed in 1997, but they still build fishing boats at Buckie in Moray. Engineering interests include firms producing off-road vehicles and rifles. Many of the conglomerate's interests are related to rural and coastal life, not least their land management and agricultural activities on the Ormsary estate and on the nearby Isle of Jura.

The many public bodies on which he has served include some connected with shipbuilding and agriculture, and he also has links with Strathclyde University which made him an honorary Doctor of Laws (LLD) in 1979. He was a member of the Royal Company of Archers.

In 1999, Lithgow passed on the chairmanship to his son James, around the time of his 65th birthday. At the time, the press reported his belief that many of British shipbuilding's problems in the 1960s and 1970s could be attributed to government policies stemming from the Treasury. He had apparently "seriously considered relocating to Australia".

The Lithgow Group still have offices at Langbank, close to the house the first William Lithgow moved to in 1883.

== Personal life ==
Lithgow listed his hobbies as including "rural life, invention and photography". In 2006, he held an address in Western Australia, but Ormsary remained his home, as well part of his title as 2nd Baronet of Ormsary.

Lithgow died on 28 February 2022, aged 87.

== Arms ==
Coat of arms of Sir William Lithgow, 2nd Baronet
| Crest An otter on a rock Proper. Escutcheon Parted per chevron Sable and Argent three estoiles in chief of the second and in base in a sea undy Azure and of the second a galley sails furled of the first flagged Gules. Motto Per Mare Per Terras |

Baronetage of the United Kingdom
| Preceded by James Lithgow | Baronet (of Ormsary); 1952–2022 | Succeeded by James Frank Lithgow |
