= Aloha Tower =

- U.S. National Register of Historic Places
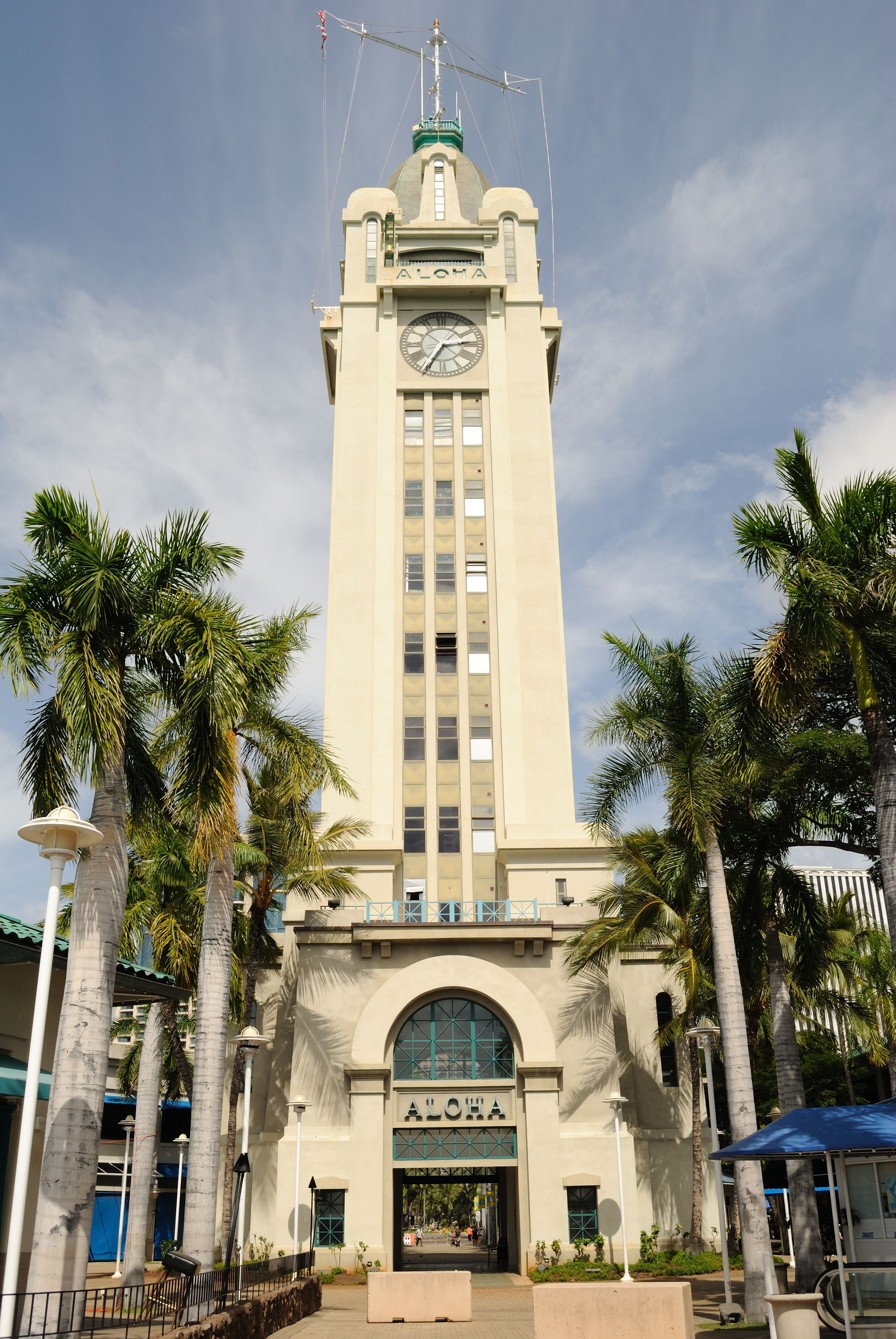
- The Aloha Tower has been greeting vessels to port at Honolulu Harbor since September 11, 1926.

- Location within Honolulu Location within Oahu Location within Hawaii
- Location: Honolulu, HI
- Coordinates: 21°18′25.5″N 157°51′57.5″W
- Built: 1926
- Architect: Arthur L. Reynolds
- Architectural style: Late Gothic Revival, Art Deco
- NRHP reference No.: 76000660
- Added to NRHP: May 13, 1976

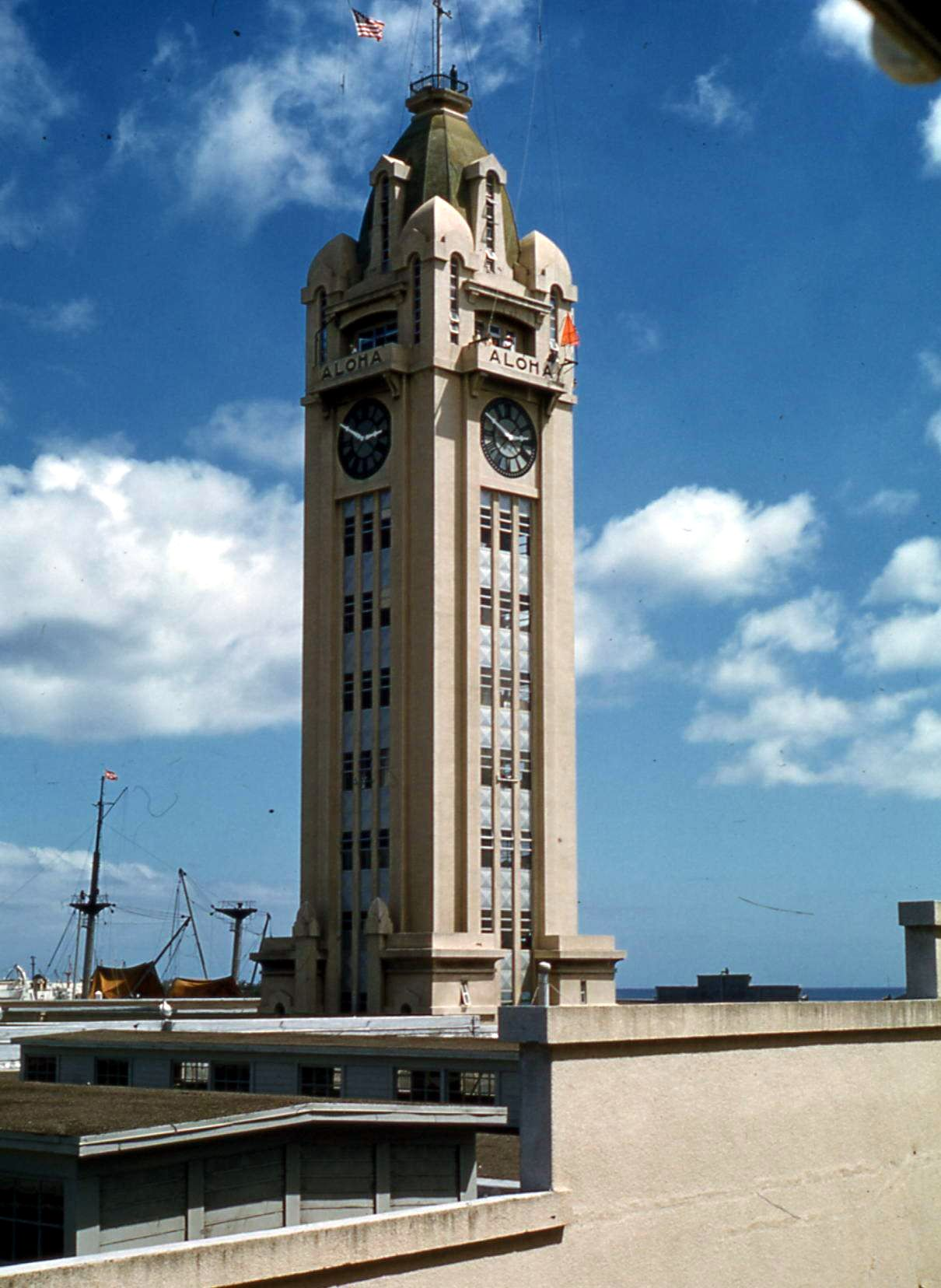
The tower in daylight (1959)

The Aloha Tower is a retired lighthouse that is considered one of the landmarks of the state of Hawaii in the United States. Opened on September 11, 1926, at a cost of $160,000 ($2,805,206 in 2024), the tower is at Pier 9 of Honolulu Harbor. It is a guiding beacon welcoming vessels to the City and County of Honolulu. Just as the Statue of Liberty greeted hundreds of thousands of immigrants each year to New York City, the Aloha Tower greeted hundreds of thousands of immigrants to Honolulu. At 10 stories and 184 feet (56 m) of height topped with 40 feet (12 m) of flag mast, Aloha Tower was Hawaii's tallest structure for four decades. It was built in the Hawaiian Gothic architectural style.

== History ==
=== Attack on Pearl Harbor ===
After the attack on Pearl Harbor on December 7, 1941, Coast Guardsmen from the USCGC Taney (WHEC-37) were ordered to take up defensive positions around Aloha Tower and protect it from occupation. The tower was painted in camouflage.

=== Redevelopment ===
In 1981, the Governor of Hawaii and the Hawaii State Department of Business, Economic Development and Tourism established the Aloha Tower Development Corporation. The public corporation was charged with developing the land around the tower to benefit the state's commercial trade industry based at Honolulu Harbor while giving Hawaii residents ample access to the downtown waterfront. The entire Aloha Tower Complex, as defined by the public corporation, was identified as Piers 5 and 6, Piers 8 through 23, and portions of Nimitz Highway and Iwilei.

=== Museum marketplace ===
In 1982, the Hawaii Maritime Center opened near the Aloha Tower in an old royal pier to present the history of Honolulu Harbor and the industries it served. In 2002, the Hawaii Maritime Center became an incorporated institution of the Bishop Museum. The center closed to the public on May 1, 2009, and was converted into a Hawaii Pacific University dormitory in 2015.

Docked at the royal pier was the Falls of Clyde, a historic shipping vessel. The Falls of Clyde was scuttled in 2025.

== Recent developments ==
=== Highway tunnel proposal ===
In 2004, a controversial proposal was made to construct an underground highway tunnel beneath the complex.

=== Future Skyline service ===
Proposals involving introducing rail transit near the Aloha Tower have been discussed for years. Initially, this included the re-establishment of streetcars, but that changed to a light metro system once the Skyline Project was announced. The Kuloloia (Downtown) Skyline station will be built near the Aloha Tower. The station is under construction and is expected to open in 2031.

=== Proposed redevelopment of adjacent areas ===
As part of the adjacent Skyline Station's transit oriented development plan, the parking lot fronting the Aloha Tower and the adjacent decommissioned Hawaiian Electric power plant would be demolished for various mixed-use developments. The surrounding commercial offices would be converted into residential mixed-use condos. The first conversion, the Modea condo, is expected to be completed in 2025.

=== Hawaii Pacific University ===
In 2015, Hawaii Pacific University took over the former Aloha Tower Marketplace and converted it into an expansion of its campus, including 78 student housing units for 278 students.

=== Security concerns following September 11, 2001 attacks ===
In consideration of heightened security measures after the September 11, 2001 terrorist attacks, public access to the observation deck was restricted, but it has since reopened.

== Concerts ==
American hard rock band Skid Row performed in concert at Aloha Tower Stage on October 10, 1992.

== Gallery ==
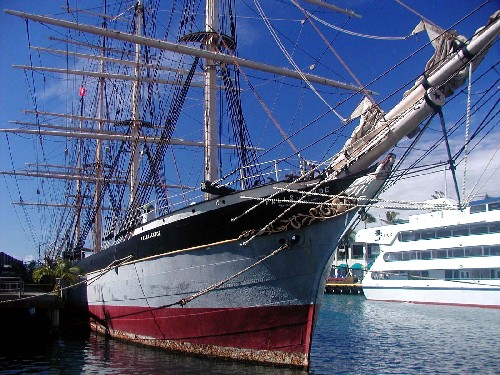
Docked at the Aloha Tower Complex is the Falls of Clyde, the only iron-hulled, four-masted ship in the world.

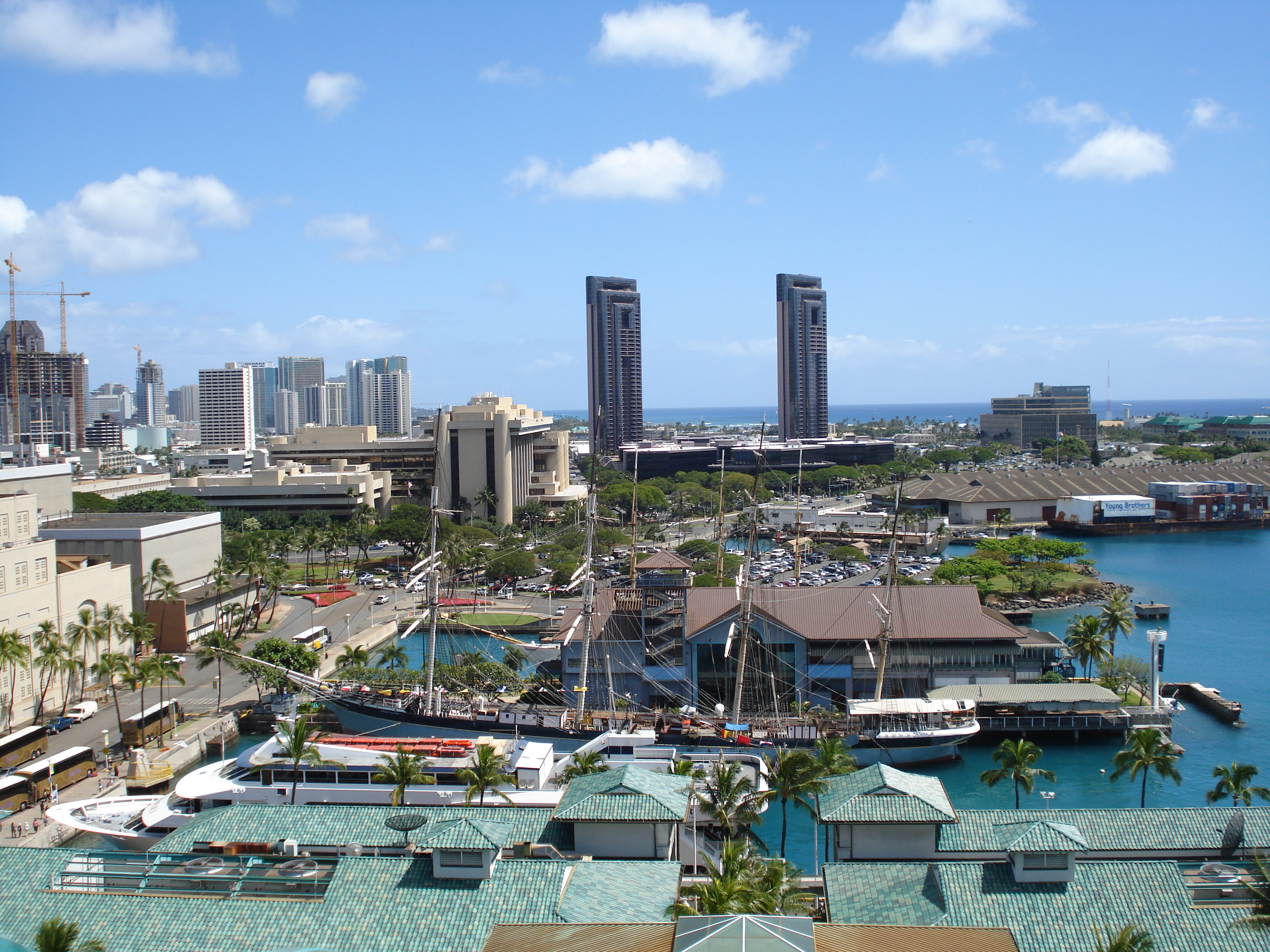
The Hawaii Maritime Center and the Falls of Clyde seen from Aloha Tower, looking east

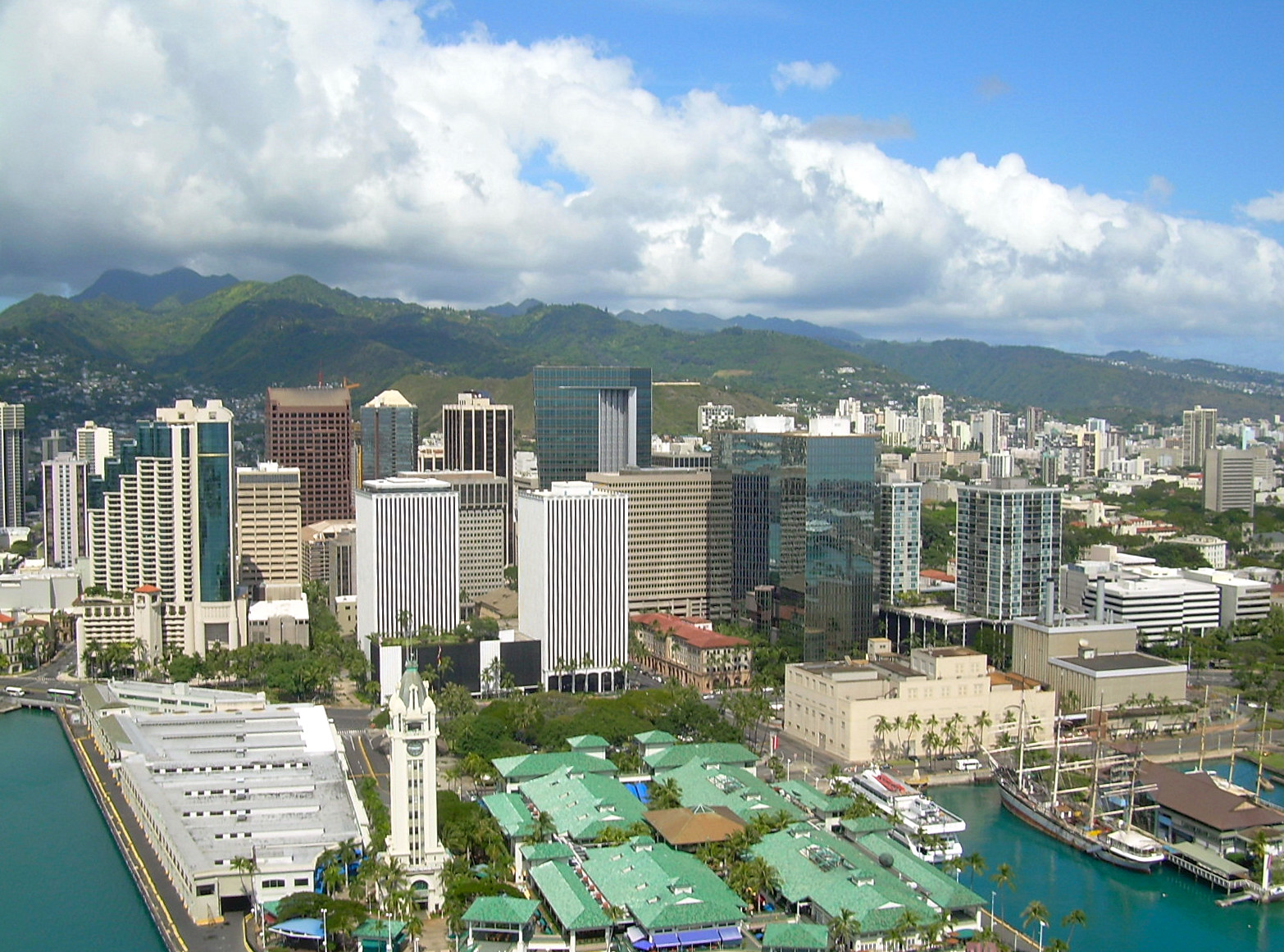
Downtown Honolulu featuring the Aloha Tower, the Falls of Clyde, and First Hawaiian Center.

== See also ==
- List of lighthouses in Hawaii
