= William Lithgow (shipbuilder) =

Scottish ship-designer

William Todd Lithgow (24 September 1854– 7 June 1908) was a Scottish ship-designer who became sole owner of an extremely successful shipbuilding company. For much of the 20th century its name was Lithgows, as it was developed further by William's sons Sir James Lithgow (1883–1952) and Henry Lithgow (1886–1948), and then by his grandson Sir William Lithgow (born 1934). By 1950 it was the largest private shipbuilding company in the world.

== Biography ==
William Lithgow started his working life as an apprentice ship's draughtsman in Port Glasgow, on the River Clyde, when the Clyde was the biggest shipbuilding area in Britain.

Lithgow's parents both died before he was seventeen. His father had sold cotton yarn and left Lithgow with £1000 to invest in shipbuilding. In 1874 he went into partnership with Joseph Russell (c. 1834 – 1917), an experienced shipbuilder who was the major investor in their firm: Russell & Co. Anderson Rodger (c. 1843 – 1909) was the third partner. The core of their business was building large iron sailing ships intended for long-haul, slow cargo transport. Lithgow was chief draughtsman-designer and his work was crucial to their strategy of standardising hull shapes and components, thus increasing efficiency and profitability.

As the company expanded into new shipyards including their future base, the Kingston Yard, Lithgow became more and more prosperous. In 1879 he married Agnes Birkmyre, from a prominent local family of rope-manufacturers and shipbuilders, and in 1883 they moved from Port Glasgow to a grander family home, Drums, a few miles further up the Clyde at Langbank. James was born that year, and Henry in 1886.

Sales were helped by Russell & Co.'s policy of taking on a proportion of the owners' investment in their ships, and they were also the first British company to build ships on spec. After building 34 ships totalling over 70,000 tons in one year, Lithgow and his partners won the 1890 Blue Ribband award for maximum output.

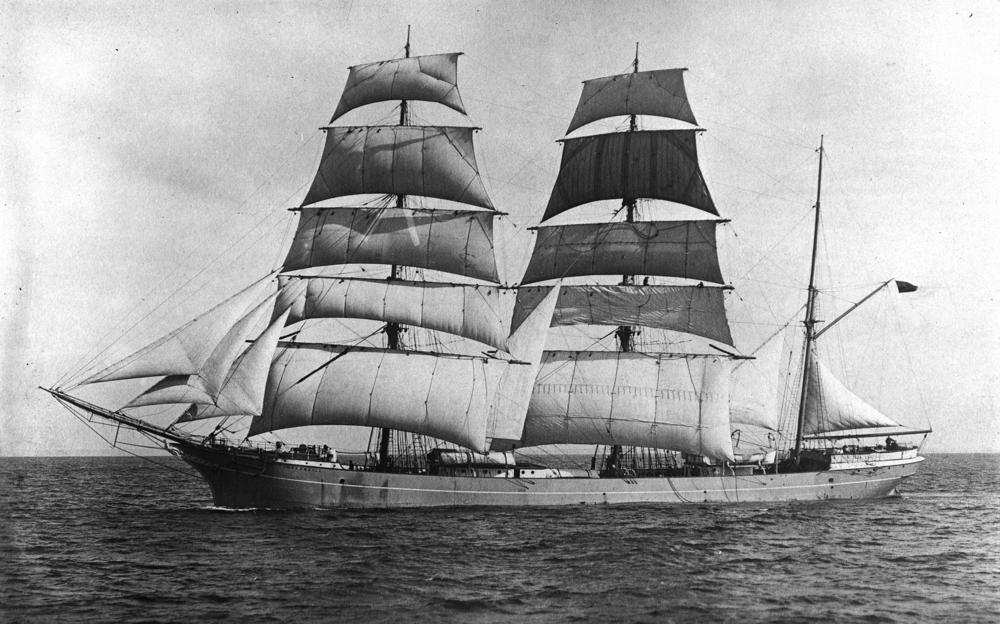
SV Inverneill, later named Garthneill launched on 28 May 1895 by Russell & Co Port Glasgow with Yard No 374.

Although the 1880s were a busy and successful decade for Russell & Co., there were tensions between Lithgow and Rodger which led to the partnership dissolving. Lithgow kept the original company name and the Kingston Yard. Russell, who had a high opinion of his younger colleague, offered support but Lithgow was now sole owner of the business.

The 1890s saw a shift away from their first generation of sailing ships towards tramp steamers, and the last rigged vessel was launched in 1894. The firm continued to grow and prosper, and Lithgow consolidated the family's position in the later years of his life by investing in stocks and transferring money to his sons. James came on board as apprentice in 1901, Lithgow bought an estate at Ormsary in Knapdale, Argyll in 1902, and Henry started his apprenticeship in 1905.

William Lithgow suffered a serious health crisis in 1907, which brought Joseph Russell out of retirement to help the next generation of Lithgows with the business which still bore Russell's name. Lithgow died in 1908, having turned his initial £1000 into more than £2 million. Publication of his will led to the title of "millionaire shipbuilder", with newspaper comment on the "huge" size of his "interest in the firm of Messrs Russell & Company".

In 1918, Russell & Co. was incorporated as Lithgows, Ltd.

== William Lithgow's ships ==
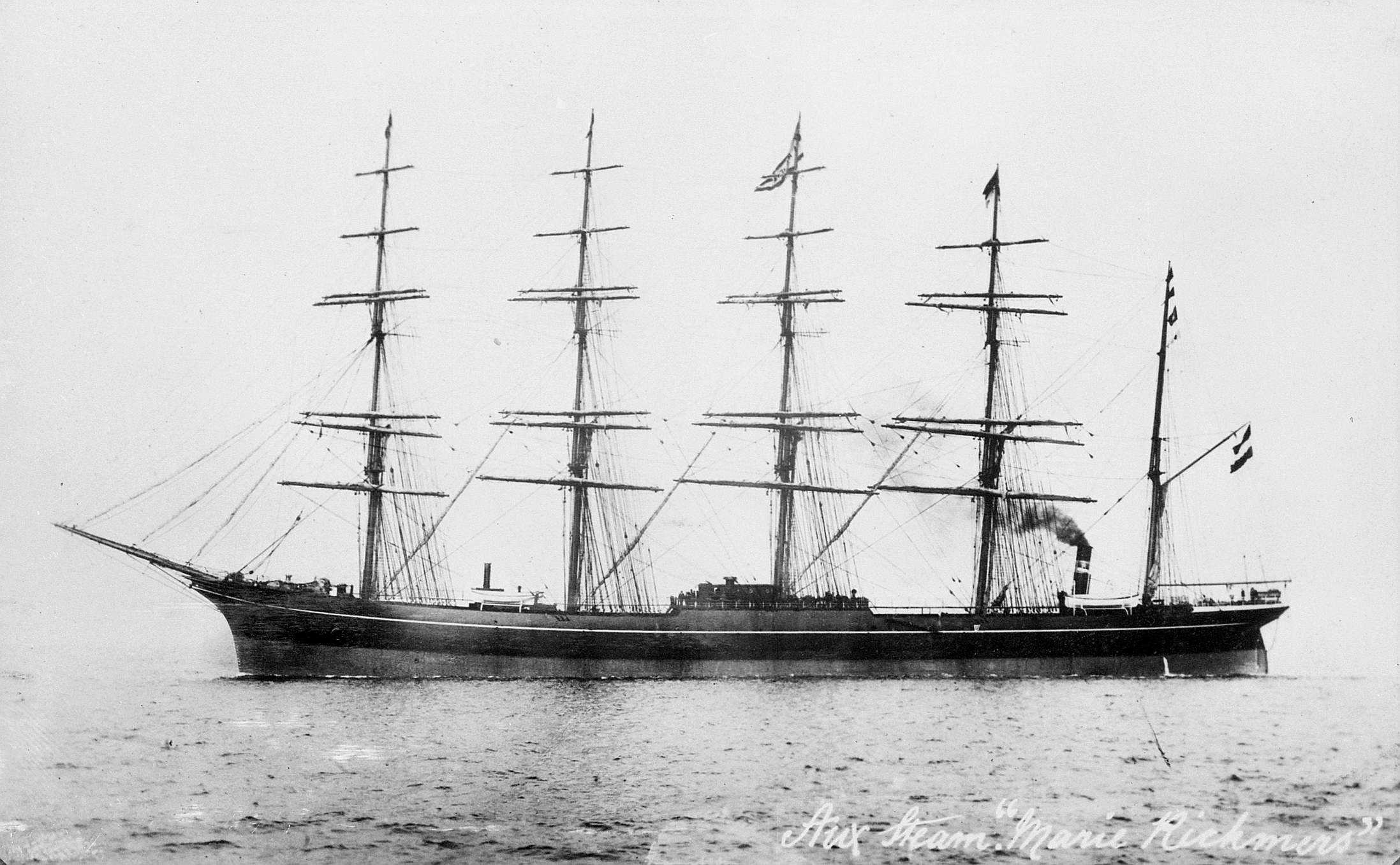
Maria Rickmers, one of the first five-masted ships

Russell & Co.'s best-known ship, Falls of Clyde, was one of their earlier vessels, built in 1878 as part of a series named after Scottish waterfalls for the Falls Line. A four-masted "British medium clipper", solidly built with "iron Z-bar frames and double riveted iron plate", it was highly rated by the insurers, Lloyd's of London. Its maiden voyage was to Karachi, and many more of its early voyages were between different parts of the British Empire. The Falls Line also had Russell & Co. build ships named after the waterfalls at Bruar, Dee, Afton, Foyers, Earn, Garry, Halladale and, lastly, the Falls of Ettrick which was launched in 1894.

In 1891 the Kingston Yard saw the launch of one of the first five-masted ships in the world, Maria Rickmers, and in 1901 Lithgow built what was the "largest four-masted vessel afloat" at the time. This was an oil carrier ordered by the Anglo-American Oil Company: Brilliant.

The city of Dundee has an online collection of photographs of four- and three-masted ships built by Russell & Co. and photographed in Dundee docks in the late 19th century. Looking through these archives and also exploring a database of Clyde-built ships gives a glimpse of the extent of Russell & Co.'s enterprise, and the number of companies who bought their ships.

== Reading ==
- Moss, Michael S. "William Todd Lithgow - Founder of a Fortune," Scottish Historical Review, April 1983, Vol. 62#1 pp 47–72
- Slaven, Anthony The Lithgow Family in the Oxford Dictionary of National Biography
- Walker, Fred M. The Song of the Clyde: A History of Clyde Shipbuilding (1984)
- Walker, Fred.M. Joseph Russell in the Newsletter of the Royal Institution of Naval Architects (Oct 2005)
