= Hawaiʻi Maritime Center =

Maritime museum in Honolulu, Hawaii

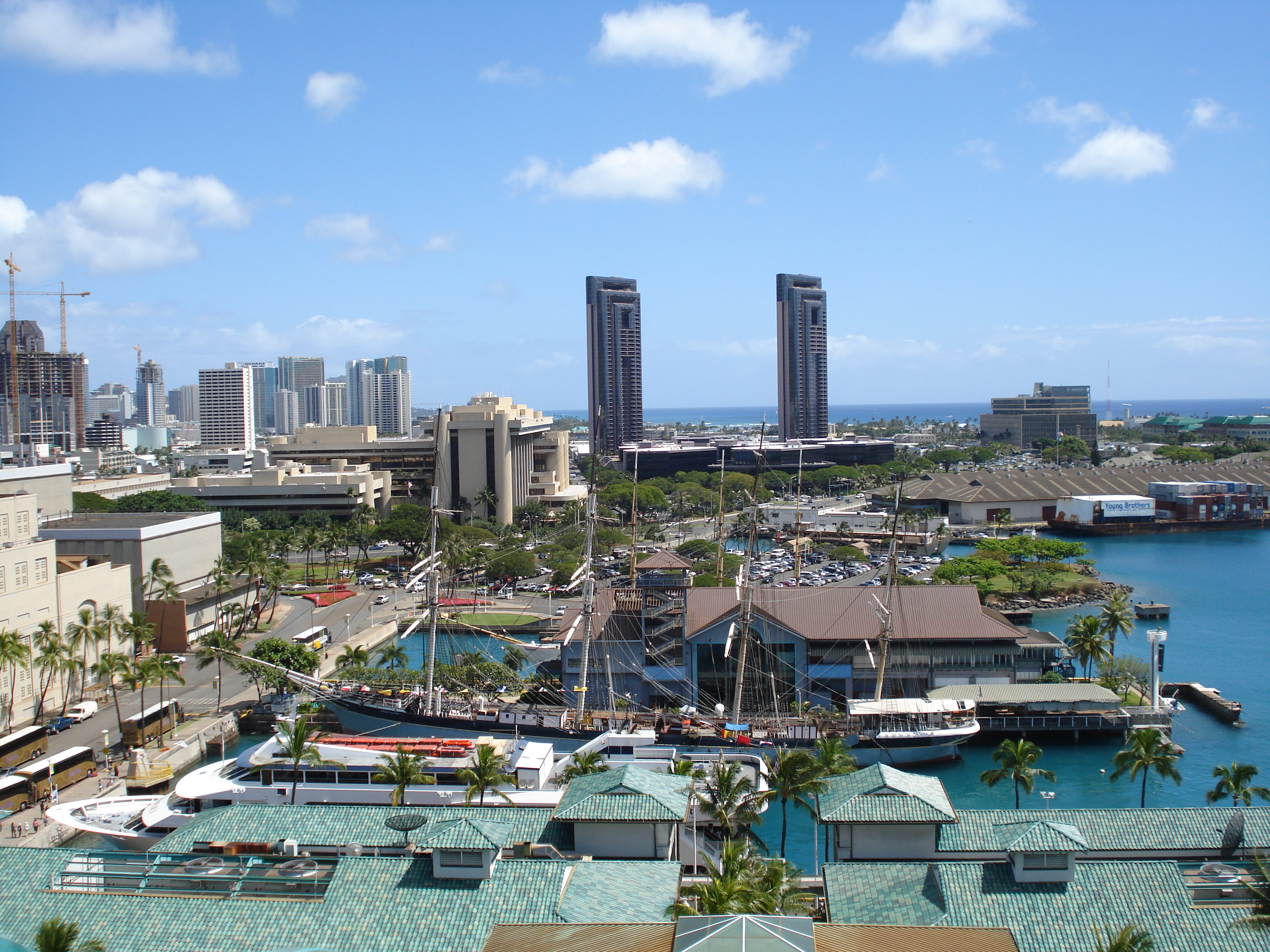
- Aerial view of the Hawaiʻi Maritime Center from Aloha Tower
- Established: 1988
- Dissolved: 2009
- Location: Pier 7, Honolulu Harbor, Honolulu, Hawaii
- Coordinates: 21°18.322′N 157°51.907′W
- Type: Maritime museum
- Owner: Bishop Museum

The Hawaiʻi Maritime Center was the principal maritime museum in the State of Hawaiʻi from 1988 until it closed in 2009. Located at Pier 7 of Honolulu Harbor east of Aloha Tower, the center was a campus of the Princess Bernice Pauahi Bishop Museum.

== History ==
The Hawaiʻi Maritime Center was built on what was once the private boathouse of King David Kalakaua.

== Vessels ==
The center was home to the only four-masted, full-rigged ship in the world called the Falls of Clyde. The Falls of Clyde was built in 1878 for the oil industry and is a National Historic Landmark. Also docked at the Hawaiʻi Maritime Center was the voyaging canoe Hokuleʻa, a scientific research vessel of great importance to native Hawaiian culture.

== Closure ==
Due to prevailing economic conditions, the Hawaiʻi Maritime Center was closed to the public effective May 1, 2009. In December 2017, the Bishop Museum transferred its lease between the Maritime Center and the State of Hawaii to a third party, and ceased operating the center. Plans for its future were unknown at that time.

== See also ==
- List of maritime museums in the United States
