= Falls Line =

Shipping line in the late 19th and early 20th century

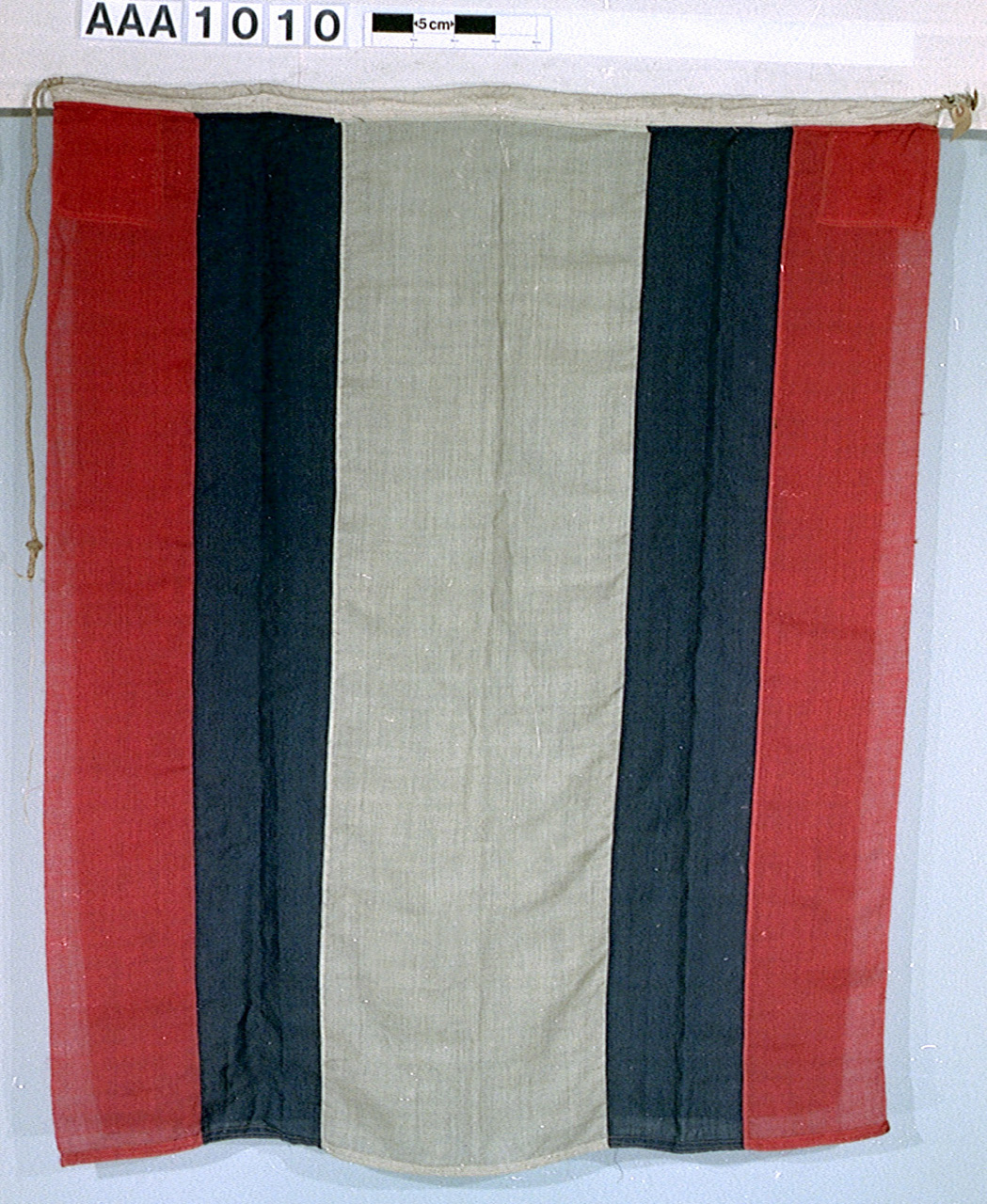
House flag of the Falls Line.

The Falls Line was a Scottish shipping line in the late 19th and early 20th centuries. The line operated ships of two companies; Wright, Breakenridge & Co. (from 1878 up to 1892) and Wright and Graham & Co. (from 1892). Both companies' ships used the same flag. The Falls Line does not appear to have operated ships after 1914, although some of the company's ships continued in operation for other owners.

The Falls Line's offices were at 111 Union Street, Glasgow, Scotland.

== Ships of the Falls Line ==
The Falls Line's ships were distinguished by all being named after Scottish river falls.

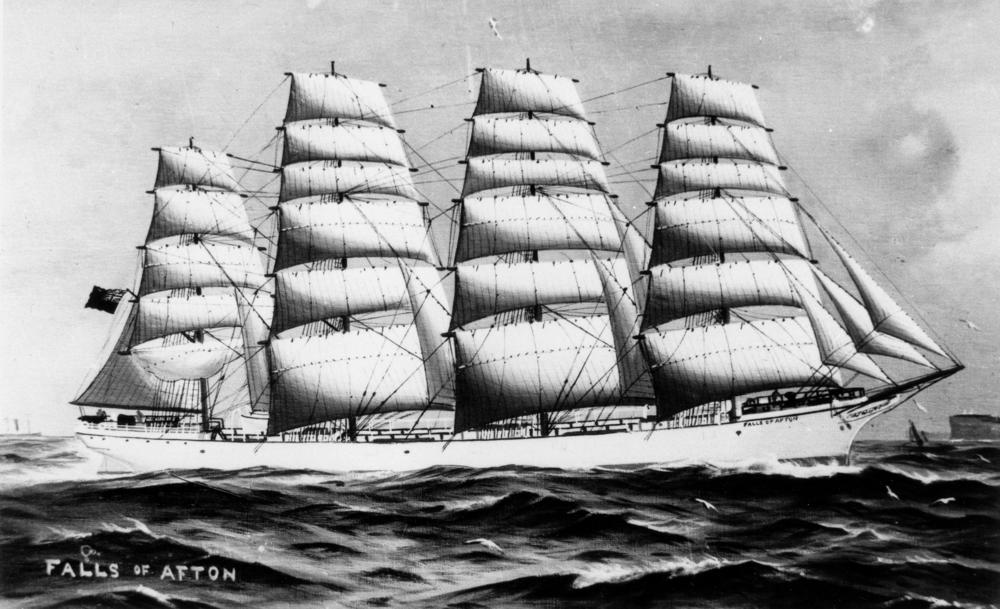
Falls of Afton, a four-mast, full-rigged ship.

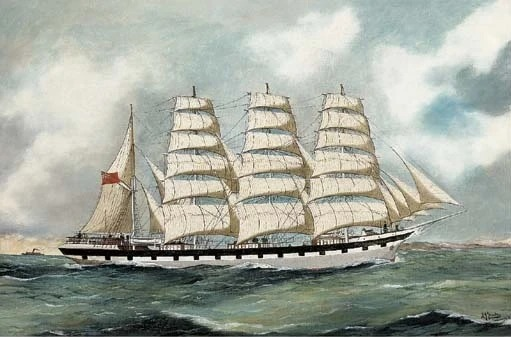
Falls of Halladale, a four-mast barque.

The Falls Line sailing vessels that were originally operated by Wright, Breakenridge & Co. were:

- Falls of Clyde, built in 1878.
- Falls of Bruar, built in 1879.
- Falls of Dee, built in 1882, sold in 1901 and renamed Teie in 1910
- Falls of Afton, built in 1882.
- Falls of Foyers, bult in 1883.
- Falls of Earn, built in 1884.
- Falls of Halladale, built in 1886.
- Falls of Garry, built in 1886, sold as a wreck in 1898 and repaired, then resold in 1904.

There was also another sailing vessel that was only ever operated by Wright, Graham & Co.

- Falls of Ettrick, built in 1894.

All were similar four-masted, iron-hulled, sailing vessels, and all were built by Russell & Co. Most were full-rigged ships, but three of the vessels were rigged as barques; Falls of Halladale, Falls of Garry, and Falls of Ettrick.

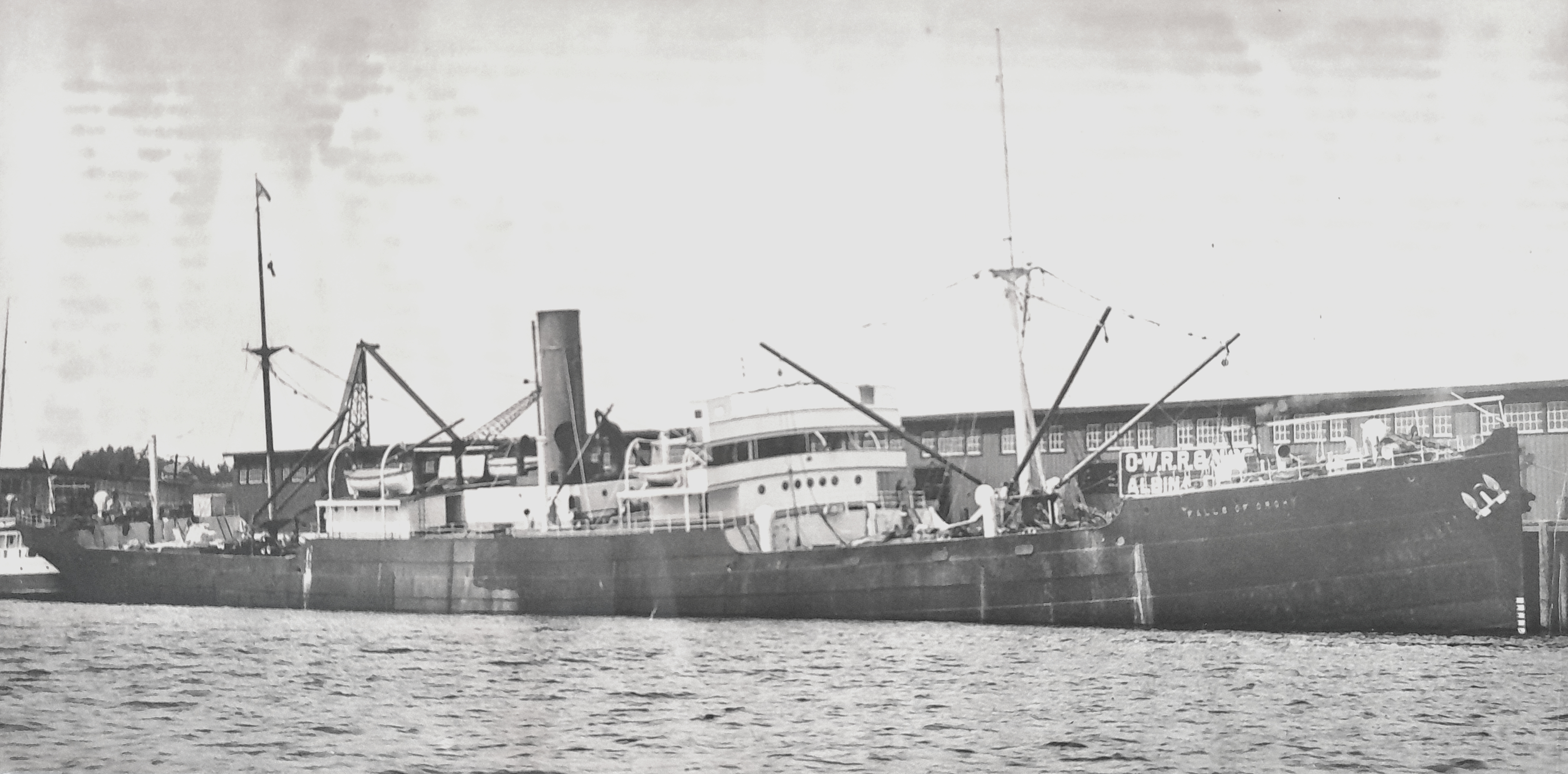
Falls of Orchy berthed at the Albina Yard, Portland, Oregon, between 1910 and 1915.

These steamships—also named for Scottish river falls—operated under the Falls Line flag managed by Wright, Graham & Co..

- s.s. Falls of Bracklinn, built in 1894; the ship went missing after leaving Baltimore in 1897.
- s.s. Falls of Keltie, built in 1898, sold in 1905 and renamed Hoyle Bank, subsequently Navarachus Condouriotis (1914), Taisan Maru (1916), and Shinsan Maru (1917).
- s.s. Falls of Moness, built in 1902 originally chartered to the Indra Line as s.s. Indradeo came off charter in 1908 and was renamed Falls of Moness, sold in 1914 and renamed s.s Teakwood.
- s.s. Falls of Orchy, built in 1907, sold in 1914 and resold in 1915, when she was renamed s.s. Canastota.
- s.s. Falls of Nith, built in 1907, later sold and renamed s.s. Benito.

== Fate of the ships ==
With only one exception, all the Falls Line ships—both sail and steam—were wrecked, lost without trace, or sank, either during or after the time that the ships were under the Falls Line's flag.

German or Austrian submarine attacks, during World War I, resulted in the sinking of five of the ships (three steamers and two sailing ships); UC-17 sank Falls of Afton; UB-57 sank Benito (ex-Falls of Nith); U-14 sank Teakwood (ex-Falls of Moness); UB-47 sank Shinsan Maru (ex-Falls of Keltie); and UC-45 sank Teie (ex-Falls of Dee).

The Falls of Clyde, the oldest of the Falls Line ships, was the sole survivor. In time, she became the last surviving iron-hulled, four-masted, fully square-rigged ship. Despite being preserved as a floating museum exhibit, in Honolulu, neglect and lack of funding left her in a non-viable condition. After 146 years afloat, she was towed out to sea and scuttled on 15 October 2025.
