= Lithgow baronets =

Baronetcy in the Baronetage of the United Kingdom

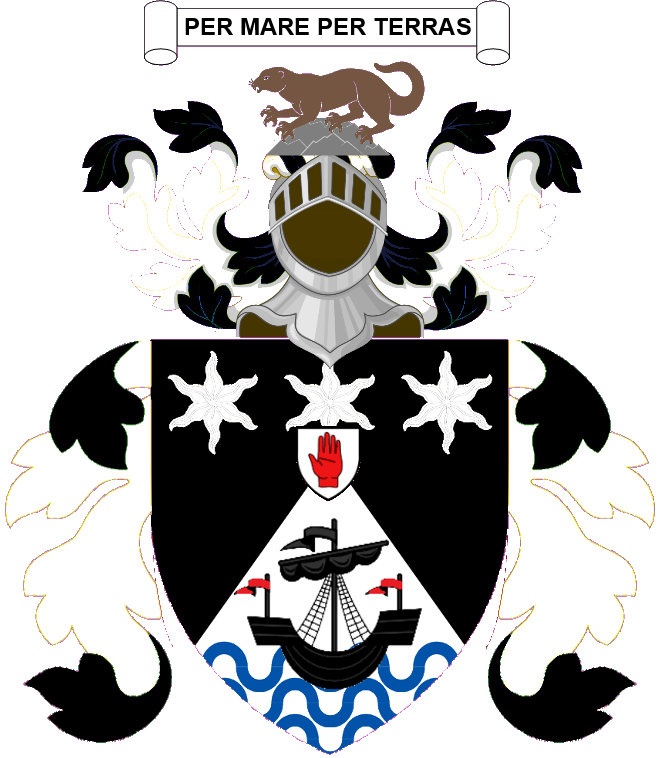
- Crest: An otter on a rock Proper.
- Shield: Parted per chevron Sable and Argent three estoiles in chief of the second and in base in a sea undy Azure and of the second a galley sails furled of the first flagged Gules.
- Motto: Per Mare Per Terras

The Lithgow Baronetcy, of Ormsary in the County of Argyll, is a title in the Baronetage of the United Kingdom. It was created on 1 July 1925 for the Scottish shipbuilder James Lithgow. As of 2022 the title is held by his grandson, the third Baronet, who succeeded in 2022.

The family seat is Ormsary, Lochgilphead, Argyll.

== Lithgow baronets, of Ormsary (1925) ==
- Sir James Lithgow, 1st Baronet (1883–1952)
- Sir William James Lithgow, 2nd Baronet (1934–2022)
- Sir James Frank Lithgow, 3rd Baronet (born 1970)

The heir apparent is Henry James Lithgow (born 1998)
