= Sir James Lithgow, 1st Baronet =

Scottish industrialist

Sir James Lithgow Bt GBE CB MC TD
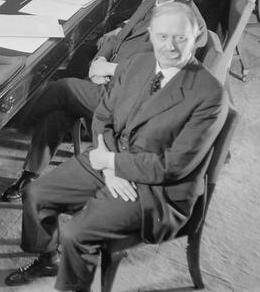

Sir James Lithgow, 1st Baronet, (27 January 1883 – 23 February 1952) was a Scottish industrialist who played a major role in restructuring the British shipbuilding and steelmaking industries in the 1930s in addition to playing an important role in formulating public policy and supervising wartime production.

== Early life ==
James was born in Port Glasgow, Scotland, the son of William Todd Lithgow; in the same year his parents moved to Langbank. His father was a partner in the shipbuilding firm of Russell & Co. and James was educated along with his brother Henry Lithgow, at first privately at home then at the Glasgow Academy before the two were apprenticed in the shipbuilding industry. William's health failed in 1907 and his two sons were made partners. William died the following year and the two brothers, who were very close, took control of the company.

== Shipbuilding ==
The brothers developed the business with James taking on a wider industry role in the Clyde Shipbuilders' Association where he met Andrew Rae Duncan. The brothers agreed that in the event of war, James would take on military service while Henry would run the shipyard so James joined the Royal Garrison Artillery, initially in the Volunteer Force, and at the creation of the Territorial Force he was a lieutenant in the Clyde Royal Garrison Artillery. During World War I, James served in a howitzer battery on the Western Front and was awarded the Military Cross, breveted lieutenant-colonel and awarded the Territorial Decoration. However, James became resentful of his military service, believing that he would contribute more to the war effort back at the shipbuilding yard. It was not until May 1917 that Sir Eric Campbell Geddes appointed him director of merchant shipbuilding with responsibility to ensure that production targets were achieved. This was James's first step into public life and policy, and introduced him to men such as Lords Pirrie and Weir. While carrying out this role he was given the acting rank of lieutenant-colonel, and attached to the Royal Engineers.

James rejoined Henry in the business in 1919 at which point they restructured the partnership of Russell & Co into a private limited company, Lithgows Ltd. They then embarked on a rapid process of acquisition and expansion, adopting vertical integration and taking the company into coal mining and steelmaking. However, James was becoming increasingly involved in public affairs, being appointed a Deputy Lieutenant of Renfrewshire in 1919, and becoming president of the Shipbuilding Employers' Federation in 1920. James renewed his contacts with Lord Weir who was then president of the National Confederation of Employers' Organisations. James became vice-president of the National Confederation in 1922 and was the United Kingdom's representative at the International Labour Organization in Geneva between 1922 and 1927, making a connection with Horace Wilson. James was created a baronet by Stanley Baldwin in the 1925 Birthday Honours for this work. The brothers purchased the engine works of Rankine and Blackmore in 1923. James had retained his Territorial commission, commanding the Clyde Coast Brigade, Royal Garrison Artillery, and was promoted to substantive lieutenant-colonel in 1924. He was appointed Honorary Colonel of its successor units, the Clyde Heavy Brigade, Royal Artillery, and 416th (Clyde) Coast Regiment, RA, from 1924.

This was the era of Red Clydeside and the brothers had strong views on shipbuilding and industry in general. James was the public spokesman of the two and was vocal in his criticism of organised labour. James believed in rigorous management control of costs and wages through the use of automation and technology, and efficient exploitation of manual labour. He further believed that there was overcapacity in the shipbuilding industry and that yard closures and job losses were inevitable. James saw organised labour as naturally opposed to his policies but claimed that a rationalised industry would provide sustainable jobs and provide a basis for growth.

Through Duncan, James approached governor of the Bank of England Montagu Norman to underwrite a rationalisation scheme for the shipbuilding industry. In 1930 National Shipbuilders Securities (NSS - actually NS Security) was created with James as chairman and architect of a scheme to reduce shipbuilding capacity. At the same time he became president of the Federation of British Industry and chairman of the Scottish National Development Council. In the decade to 1939, the NSS purchased and closed around a third of British shipbuilding capacity. William Beardmore and Company owed considerable debt to the Bank of England and its Dalmuir yard was the first to close under the scheme, the proceeds of its liquidation paying off the debt. Lithgow was the architect of the liquidation and was rewarded in 1934 by being allowed to purchase Beardmore debentures from the Bank of England on favourable terms, taking control of their iron and steel assets. It was at Beardmores that James spotted young engineering manager Ian MacGregor who broke a strike by driving a crane himself for two weeks. James accelerated his career and MacGregor went on himself to be a major industrial figure.

== Steel ==
James now focussed his rationalising zeal on the steel industry. The Lithgows owned James Dunlop & Co. and they opened talks with John Craig to merge their business with his Colville Group. The merger was finalised in 1931. In 1934 the Bank of England helped the Lithgows to buy the Steel Company of Scotland for £672,975 (£30.46 million at 2003 prices)). In 1936 the brothers sold the company to Colville for £951,750 {42.54 million at 2003 prices), the profit being donated to the Church of Scotland.

Again, contacts with Norman and Duncan in 1935 allowed the Lithgows to purchase the Fairfield Shipbuilding and Engineering Company which was entangled with the insolvency of the Anchor Line.

== Public life ==
James and his brother believed in their responsibility to invest in Scotland and James was active in attracting industry and fostering development within the region. Henry's focus on the day-to-day business enabled James to take a more public role (he retained his TA commission until retirement in 1938). In 1940, just after the outbreak of World War II, Winston Churchill called James to London, again as Controller of Merchant Shipbuilding and Repair and as a Lord Commissioner of the Admiralty. He also had a brief responsibility for tank production and worked with Harold Macmillan on the industrial capacity committee of the production council. He served as President of The Institution of Engineers and Shipbuilders in Scotland from 1929 to 1931. From 1943 to 1945 he was president of the Iron and Steel Federation, while still remaining active in Beardmores and Fairfields. In 1943 he became Vice Lieutenant of Renfrewshire. In the 1945 New Year Honours he was appointed a Knight Grand Cross of the Order of the British Empire (GBE), and in the 1947 King's Birthday Honours he was made a Companion of the Order of the Bath (CB). He was also awarded the Dutch Order of Orange-Nassau.

== Private life ==
James was very close to his brother Henry and they enjoyed shooting grouse and deer together at the family estate at Ormsary, Argyll. The two were both raised as staunch Presbyterians and James was very devout. The two brothers both lived with their mother at Drums, Langbank until James married shipowner's daughter Gwendolyn Amy Harrison in 1924 when the couple bought a house nearby at Langbank and a further house for entertaining at Ormsary. The couple had two daughters; Margaret and Ann, and a son, William who subsequently inherited the baronetcy.

The blow of Henry's death in 1948 fell hard on James. Post-war reconstruction placed heavy demands on the business in replacing lost ships in a climate of scarce raw materials. Four months after Henry's death, James suffered a thrombosis and stroke but never fully recovered. He died at Langbank and was buried at Ormsary. His wealth at death was £436,961 {£7.95 million at 2003 prices)

== Archives ==
Archive collections relating to Sir James Lithgow are held by the Archives of the University of Glasgow (GUAS) and the National Library of Scotland.

== Arms ==
Coat of arms of Sir James Lithgow, 1st Baronet
Crest An otter on a rock Proper. Escutcheon Parted per chevron Sable and Argent three estoiles in chief of the second and in base in a sea undy Azure and of the second a galley sails furled of the first flagged Gules. Motto Per Mare Per Terras

== Bibliography ==
- Reid, J. M. (1964). James Lithgow - Master of Work. London: Hutchinson.
- Slaven, A. (2006) "Lithgow family (per. c.1870–1952)", Oxford Dictionary of National Biography, Oxford University Press, online edn, Retrieved 16 February 2008 (subscription, Wikipedia Library access or UK public library membership required)

Baronetage of the United Kingdom
New title	Baronet (of Ormsary); 1925–1952	Succeeded by William Lithgow
