= Honolulu Harbor =

Harbor in Honolulu, Hawaii, United States

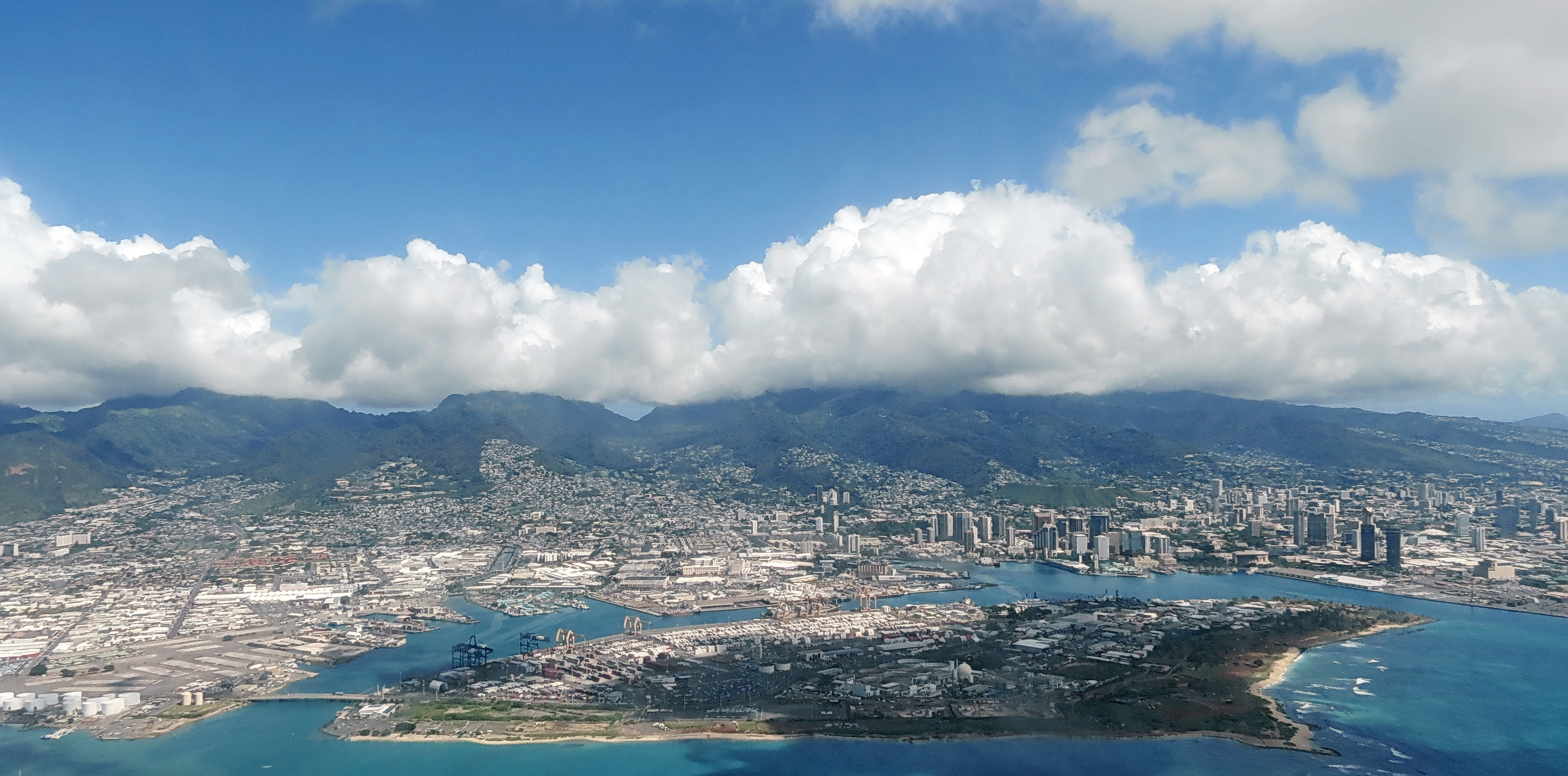
- Interactive map of Honolulu Harbor

Location
- Country: United States
- Location: Honolulu, Hawaii
- Coordinates: 21.306°N 157.869°W
- UN/LOCODE: US HNL

Details
- Operated by: Hawaii Department of Transportation

Statistics
- Website; Official website

Honolulu Harbor, also called Kuloloia and Ke Awa O Kou and the Port of Honolulu, is the principal seaport of Honolulu and the State of Hawaiʻi in the United States. From the harbor, the City & County of Honolulu was developed and urbanized, in an outward fashion, over the course of the modern history of the island of Oahu. It includes Matson, Inc. harbors on Sand Island.

== History ==
Archaeological surveys show that the area around Honolulu Harbor was bustling with human activity prior to 1100. The first European vessel to enter Honolulu Harbor was a long-boat from the British merchant ship King George. The boat rowed into the harbor on December 12, 1786, commanded by a Mr. Hayward and piloted by Towanooha, servant of a friendly Hawaiian priest. In 1794, Butterworth, a British ship commanded by Captain William Brown, entered the harbor by "warping" in. The crew dubbed it "Brown's Harbor" to their captain's dismay. Captain Brown insisted that the harbor be called "Fair Haven", which is synonymous with the Hawaiian name Honolulu.

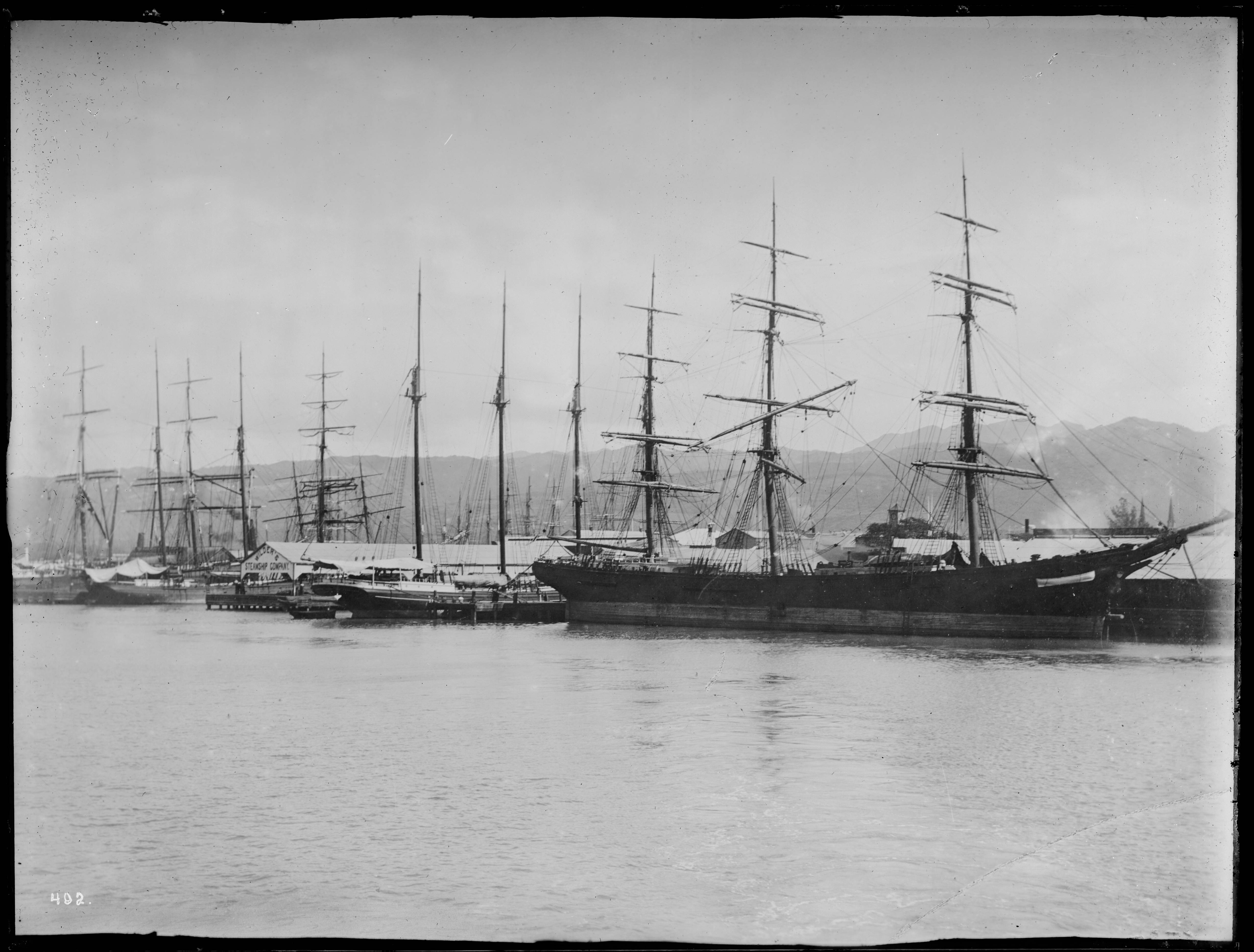
Sailing vessels at wharf in Honolulu harbor, c. 1892–1907 (CHS-402)

In 1850, Kamehameha III declared Honolulu to be the official capital of the Kingdom of Hawaiʻi. With the proclamation came a series of investments to further develop the harbor to accommodate more vessels. Honolulu Harbor quickly became the chief port of call for the trans-Pacific sandalwood, fur and whaling industries. Foreign vessels that docked at Honolulu Harbor poured vast amounts of wealth into the kingdom's coffers and provided for the well-being of native Hawaiians. The British subsequently built a fort to protect the entrance to the harbor.

In 1997, the largest and most crucial of Oahu’s and the State’s commercial harbors was Honolulu Harbor. Honolulu has become a historical Hawaiian town and transformed into the state’s capital city mainly due to its status as the world-famous port. The city title was taken from the harbor, which serves as the center of the state’s corporate and commercial operations as well as the major tourist attraction for the island’s 884,000 citizens.

The harbor was dredged to allow the easy passage of trans-Pacific deepwater sailing vessels. The sediment was dumped in tidelands and marshes, forming new land. As the downtown waterfront was developed and the many high-rises along the waterfront were constructed, early artifacts such as poi pounders, fishing lures and even human remains were unearthed along the current waterfront and along the docks near the Aloha Tower adjacent to Alakea Street and Nimitz Highway.

== Statistics ==
Honolulu Harbor is administered by the Hawaiʻi Department of Transportation Harbors Division. Honolulu Harbor handles over 11 million tons of cargo annually. The services that the harbor provides are crucial as Hawaiʻi imports over eighty percent of its required goods.

== Modernization Plans ==
Costs of completed projects

- $13 million Honolulu Piers 12 & 15
- $20 million Honolulu Pier 35 (UH SOEST)
- $1 million Honolulu Pier 39 Shed

Costs & ongoing projects

- $6 million improvements to the Honolulu Piers 24-28 utilities

Overall spending for staff

- $7 million, or 5% of total costs

Relocations of Honolulu Harbor tenants (Related to the HMP)

- Marine Spill Response Corp./Clean Islands Council from Pier 35 to Pier 12 and 15
- University of Hawaii, School of Ocean and Earth Science and Technology from Snug Harbor to Pier 35
- Pacific Shipyards International and Atlantis from Pier 41 to Pier 24

== Aloha Tower ==
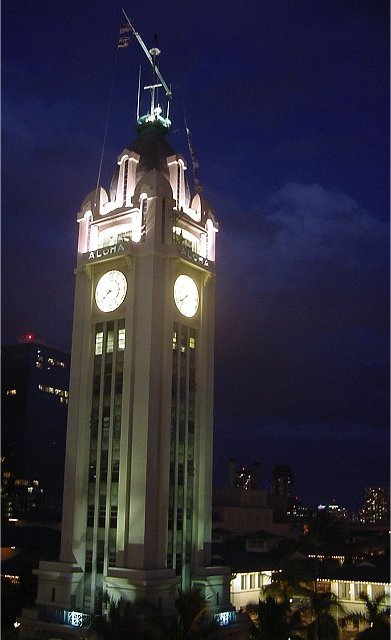
Aloha Tower has been greeting vessels to port at Honolulu Harbor since September 11, 1926.

On September 11, 1926, after five years of construction, the Aloha Tower was officially dedicated at Pier 9 of Honolulu Harbor. The tallest building in Hawaiʻi at that time, the Aloha Tower became a guiding beacon for vessels. Just as the Statue of Liberty greeted thousands of immigrants each year to New York City, the Aloha Tower greeted thousands of immigrants to Honolulu. By the time the Aloha Tower was dedicated, Honolulu was already a popular vacation destination for wealthy American and European families. They traveled on Matson steamers that docked at the Aloha Tower and were greeted by Hawaiian music, hula performers and leis.

== Recent developments ==
=== Aloha Tower ===
In 1982, the Hawaiʻi Maritime Center was opened near the Aloha Tower in an old royal pier to present the history of Honolulu Harbor and the relative industries it served. Falls of Clyde, a historic merchant ship, is docked at the royal pier. In 2002, the Hawaiʻi Maritime Center became an incorporated institution of the Bishop Museum. The Center closed in 2009. In 1994, the Aloha Tower Marketplace opened.

=== Future Skyline Rail ===
The Honolulu Harbor will be served by five Skyline stations: Mokauea (Kalihi), Niuhelewai (Kapalama), Kūwili (Iwilei), Hōlau (Chinatown), and Kuloloia (Downtown) once it opens its city center phase in 2031.
