= Scottish Ladies Open Tour =

PLGC Scottish Ladies Open Tour
- Formerly: Ladies Tartan Tour
- Sport: Golf
- Founded: 2013
- Ceased: 2016
- Organising body: Colin Farquharson; Nicola Melville
- No. of teams: Not applicable
- Country: Scotland
- Qualification: Stepping stone to the Ladies European Tour
- Sponsor: Paul Lawrie

The PLGC Scottish Ladies Open Tour (SLOT) (later the Ladies Tartan Tour) was a mini golf tour based in Scotland. It was sponsored by Paul Lawrie and set up by golf journalist Colin Farquharson and PGA Professional Nicola Melville in 2013 with the aim of acting as a 'stepping stone' to the main Ladies European Tour.

The Tour was open to all female professional golfers and to single-figure handicap female amateurs.

In 2014, the Tour was fully endorsed by the PGA in Scotland ensuring the tours continued growth and giving WPGA members more playing opportunities.

The Tour was discontinued in 2016 due to a lack of sponsorship and low participation.
