= Langbank =

Coordinates: 55.924°N 4.586°W

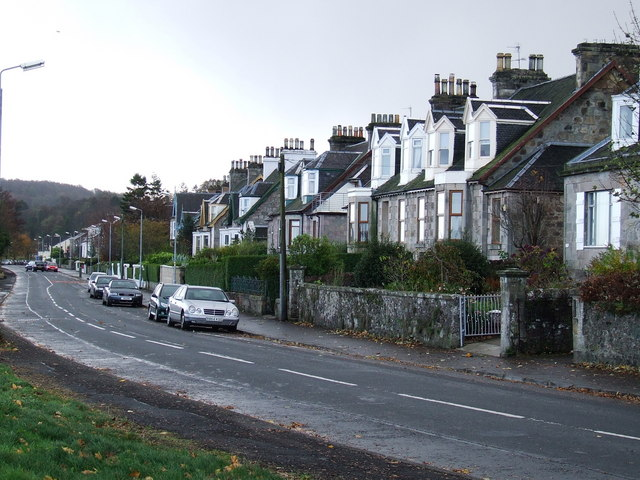
- Main Road in Langbank

- Location within Renfrewshire
- Population: 870 (2020)
- OS grid reference: NS3873
- Council area: Renfrewshire
- Lieutenancy area: Renfrewshire
- Country: Scotland
- Sovereign state: United Kingdom
- Post town: PORT GLASGOW
- Postcode district: PA14
- Dialling code: 01475
- Police: Scotland
- Fire: Scottish
- Ambulance: Scottish

Langbank is a village on the south bank of the River Clyde in Renfrewshire, Scotland. It is 9.3 miles/15 km northwest from Paisley (Renfrewshire) and 3.4 miles/5.5 km east from Port Glasgow (Inverclyde) on the A8.

== History ==
Langbank evolved as a dormitory settlement for Glasgow after the opening of the Glasgow and Greenock Railway in 1841, a function it still performs. Prior to that it was a scattered collection of farms with access to the river. An 1800 map makes reference to Longbank. It remains on the busy A8 trunk road, a few hundred yards from the start of the M8 motorway. Langbank railway station is on the Inverclyde Line.

There are two crannogs on the shoreline of the village; Langbank East crannog is at Westferry, by the start of the M8 motorway, Langbank West crannog is immediately beside the A8 dual carriageway opposite Langbank Parish Church. Both crannogs are only visible at lower states of the tide.

Visible along the shoreline west of Langbank and stretching all the way to Port Glasgow are the remains of the timber ponds where the shipyards of the lower Clyde stored timber for use in shipbuilding during the 18th Century.

== Landmarks ==
- Langbank Parish Church (1866) has a spire which was rebuilt three times.
- Formakin House (begun 1903) is a curious mansion which was never actually completed as the owner ran out of money. Features include tiny stone monkeys which clamber over the rooftops and a datestone carved with the date "1694" and the letters "DL" (standing for "Damned Lie").
- Finlaystone House (c. 1760) was built as the seat of the Cunningham Earls of Glencairn, but since the 1920s has been home to the MacMillan family and to the chief of Clan MacMillan. The estate is now a popular country park and garden centre. It is located between Langbank, Port Glasgow and Kilmacolm.
- Gleddoch House was the home of Port Glasgow Shipbuilder, Col. Sir James Lithgow Bt. It is now a hotel and leisure complex.

== St Vincent's College ==
From 1961 to 1978, St Vincent's College was situated in the village. It was a minor seminary of the Roman Catholic Church in Scotland. It was opened on 3 October 1961. The first rector was Charles McDonald Renfrew, who was a Titular Bishop of Abula and an Auxiliary Bishop of Glasgow. One of its students was the Archbishop of Glasgow, Philip Tartaglia. It closed in 1978 and the students were transferred to Blairs College near Aberdeen. The chapel was listed as a category B listed building on 9 August 1995. In 2003, after restoration work by Historic Scotland, the site was converted into accommodation, but maintained its original outwards appearance.

== Governance ==
Part of the civil parish of Erskine, Langbank also became a quoad sacra parish in the 19th century.

For modern local government purposes, Langbank is part of the Renfrewshire council area. Langbank was previously linked with its nearby and larger neighbour, Houston but is now part of a local council ward with Bishopton and Bridge of Weir (Ward 10). Langbank has its own community council. The community council is chiefly a consultative body, forming a focus for local views, and has no statutory powers of its own.

== Gallery ==
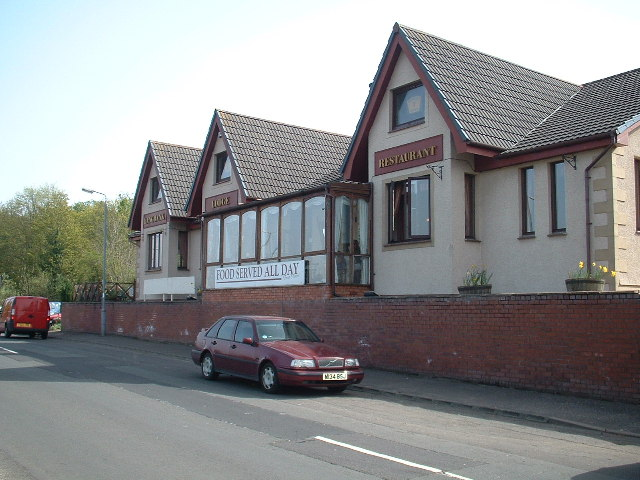
The Wheelhouse

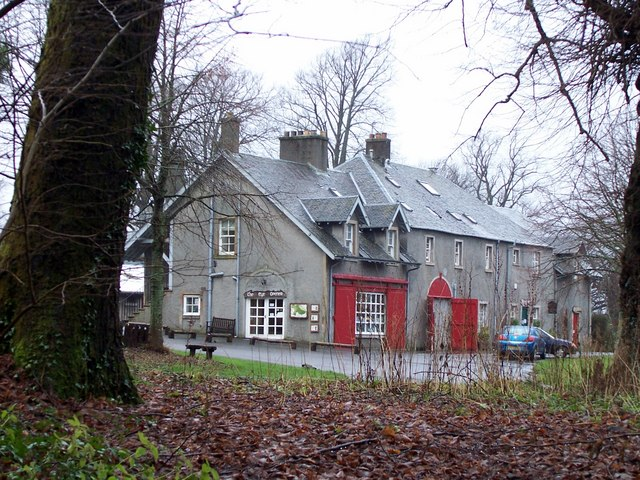
Visitor Centre at Finlaystone House

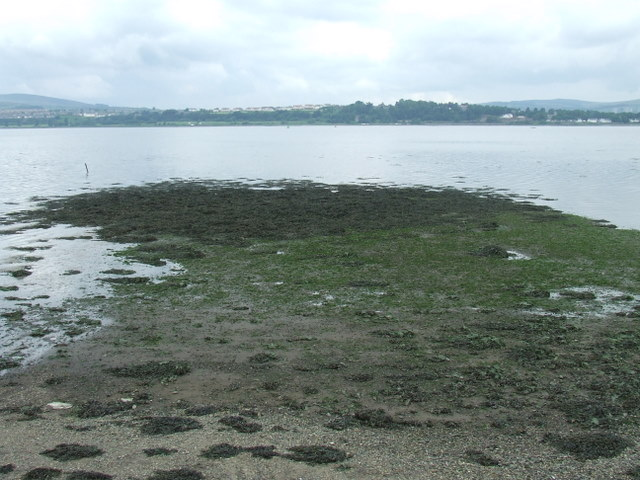
Langbank West Crannog

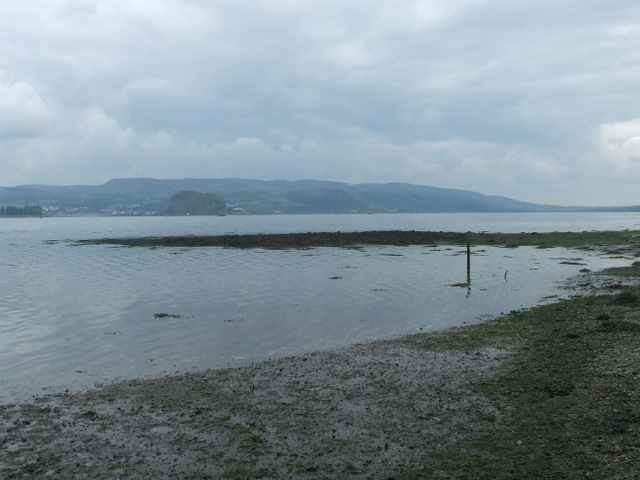
Langbank West Crannog

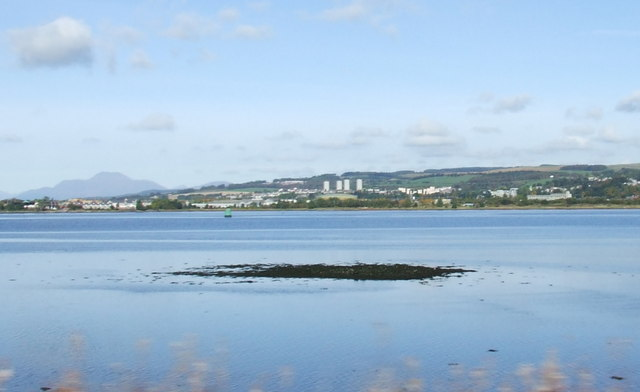
Langbank East Crannog

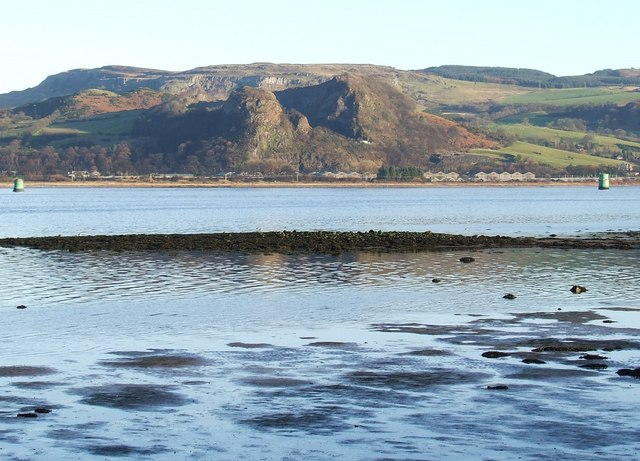
Langbank East Crannog

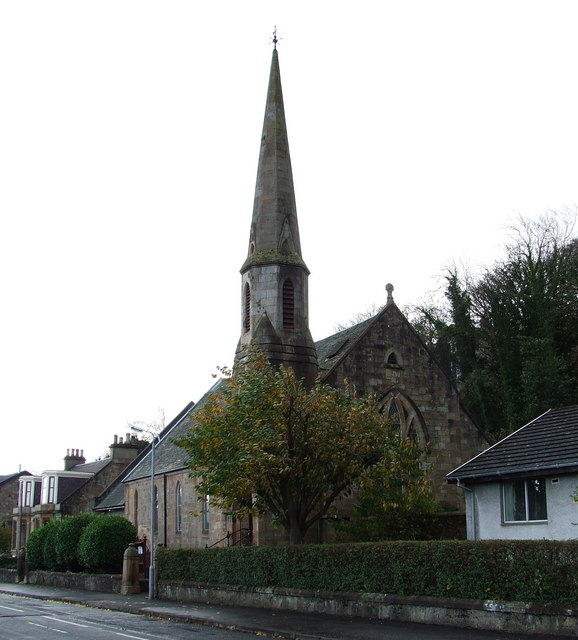
Langbank Parish Church

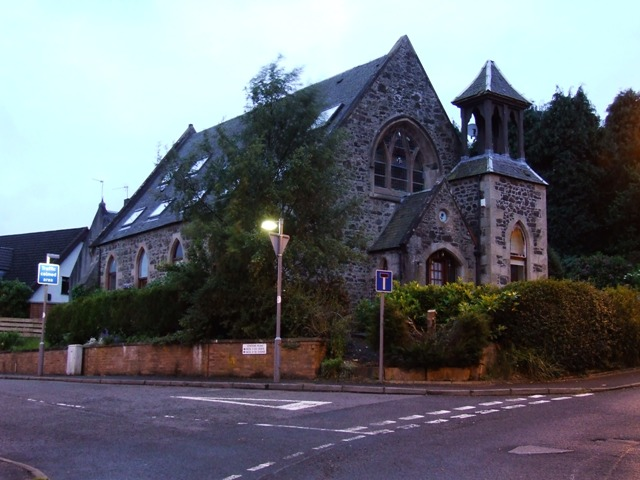
Former Langbank East Church, Station Road

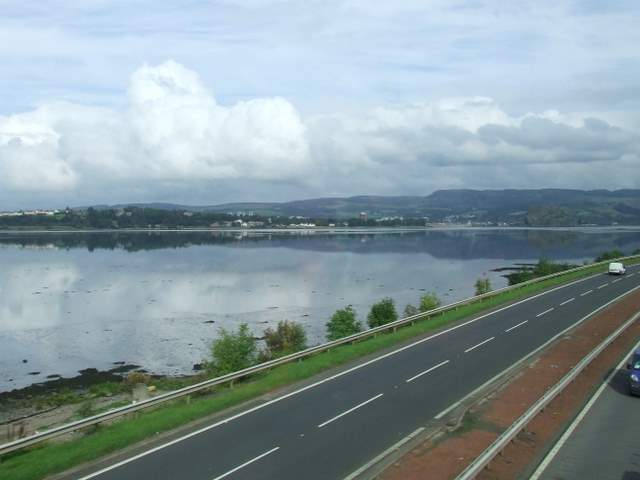
The A8 dual carriageway Langbank Bypass

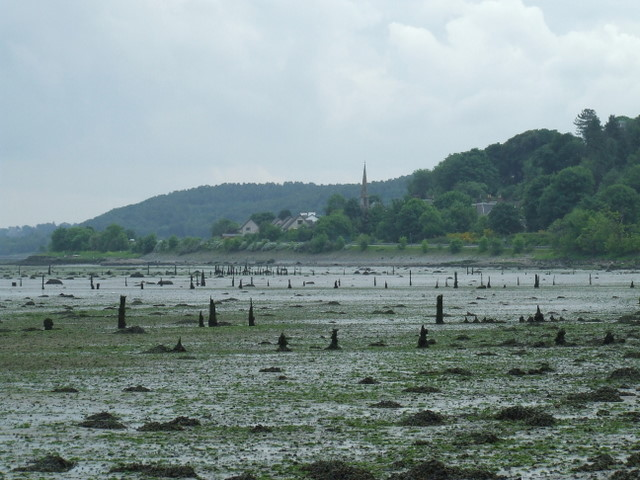
The old timber ponds near the village

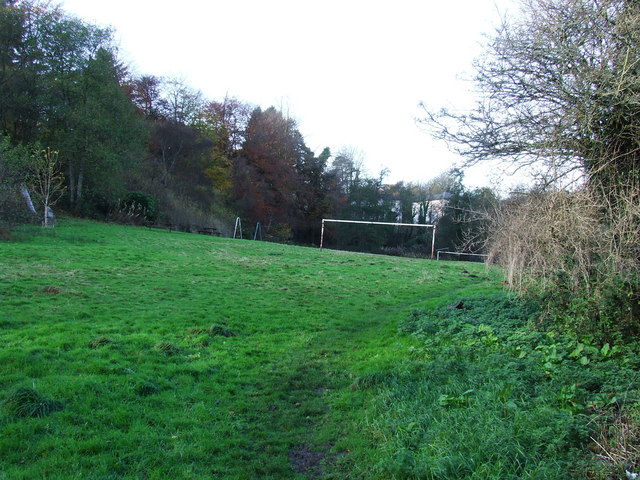
The sloping playfield by the railway station
