= Lithgows =

Shipbuilding company in Scotland

Lithgows Ltd
- Company type: Private
- Industry: Shipbuilding - yards on the Clyde nationalised in 1977; and at Buckie, closed 2013 Marine resources
- Founded: 1874
- Founder: William Lithgow
- Headquarters: Port Glasgow, UK
- Owner: Lithgow family
- Website: http://www.lithgows.co.uk

Lithgows Limited is a family-owned Scottish company that had a long involvement in shipbuilding, based in Kingston, Port Glasgow, on the River Clyde in Scotland. It has a continued involvement in marine resources.

== History ==
=== Founding ===
The Company was established by Joseph Russell and his partners Anderson Rodger and William Lithgow who leased the Bay Yard in Port Glasgow from Cunliffe & Dunlop and started trading as Russell & Co. in 1874 (Cunliffe & Dunlop became David J. Dunlop and Co in 1881 and Dunlop, Bremner and Co in 1911).

In 1879 they purchased the Cartsdyke Mid Yard from J.E. Scott and in 1881 they acquired the Kingston Shipyard from Henry Murray. The partnership was dissolved in 1891: Russell retired, Rodger took the Bay Yard and Lithgow the Kingston and Cartsdyke Yards.

In 1900 the Cartsdyke Yard was sold to Greenock Dockyard.

Then in 1908 brothers William Lithgow's sons, James and Henry, assumed control; they bought the Bay yard in 1911.

The Company then entered a period of expansion by acquisition, buying the Port Glasgow East Yard from Robert Duncan & Co in 1915 and Glasgow marine enginebuilders David Rowan & Company in 1917.

In 1918 Russell & Company was renamed Lithgows Ltd.

Further acquisitions included the Inch Yard of Dunlop, Bremner (see above) in 1919 (although it continued to trade under its own name until 1926), the Glen Yard of William Hamilton and Company also in 1919 (although it continued to trade under its own name until 1963), steel stockholders James Dunlop & Company in 1920, the closed yard of Murdoch & Murray in 1923 (giving them complete ownership of the entire Port Glasgow waterfront from Bay to Inch), the Greenock enginebuilder Rankin & Blackmore Ltd also in 1923 and the Irvine-based shipbuilder Ayrshire Dockyard Ltd in 1928.

In 1933 the Inch shipyard was sold to National Shipbuilders Security and 'sterilised' for 40 years. Then in 1935 Lithgows took control of the Fairfield Shipbuilding & Engineering Company in Govan although it continued trading as a separate entity.

Closures followed: the Bay shipyard was closed and demolished in 1935. The Robert Duncan East Shipyard which had closed in 1931 was reopened under the Lithgows name in 1937.

=== Post War ===
In 1949 Sir James Lithgow set up Scottish Ore Carriers Ltd.

In 1961 Lithgows took control of Ferguson Brothers (Port Glasgow) Ltd. at Newark (although it continued to trade as a separate entity).

In 1963 the East Yard was merged with William Hamilton and Company's Glen Yard, so acquiring an Arrol 'Goliath' gantry crane and the David Rowan engine-building subsidiary was merged with Fairfield's enginebuilding to form Fairfield Rowan Ltd.

In 1964 the Lithgow enginebuilding subsidiary of Rankin & Blackmore closed their Eagle Foundry in Greenock. Then in 1965 Fairfield Shipbuilding & Engineering was placed in receivership. It continued outwith Lithgow control as Fairfield (Glasgow) Ltd (q.v.). The enginebuilding subsidiary Fairfield Rowan was closed in 1966.

In 1966 Lithgows purchased the Inchgreen Drydock from Firth of Clyde Drydock Company. It occupied the site of Lithgows' former Gas works at Inchgreen.

In 1967 Lithgows merged with Scotts Shipbuilding and Engineering Company to form Scott Lithgow Ltd although Lithgows traded separately as Lithgows (1969) Ltd.

In 1970 Lithgows (1969) Ltd purchased the Campbeltown Shipyard Ltd and in 1972 the Glen / East Yard was absorbed into the Kingston Yard.

In 1977 Scott Lithgow Ltd (and its Scott, Lithgow and Ferguson subsidiaries) were absorbed into the state owned British Shipbuilders. After 1977 Lithgows Ltd remained in family hands and their business interests diversified into hotels, electronics and aquaculture (sold in 2010).

From 1981 the former Lithgow Kingston / Glen Yard was operated by Scott Lithgow (Offshore) Ltd. In 1983 the former Lithgow yards at Kingston / Glen were sold to Trafalgar House but were unused after 1987. The yards were partly dismantled in the years 1987 to 1995. In 1996 the Kingston / Glen yards were sold to Clydeport plc for redevelopment. Then in 1997 Clydeport leased the Inchgreen Drydock to UiE Scotland for ship refitting and the Arrol 'Goliath' Gantry Crane was demolished.

Final traces of the Kingston and Glen / East shipyards were all but removed in 2005 and 2006, with only the red main gate of the Glen Yard surviving in late 2015. The Kingston is being redeveloped for residential purposes and the Glen is now the site of a large retail development.

Lithgows Ltd returned to shipbuilding in 1996 when they purchased the Buckie Shipyard in eastern Scotland. The shipyard went into administration in August 2013. Lithgows continue to operate the Marine Resources Centre at Barcaldine, Argyll, near Oban.
