= Falls of Clyde (ship) =

1878 sail-driven oil tanker

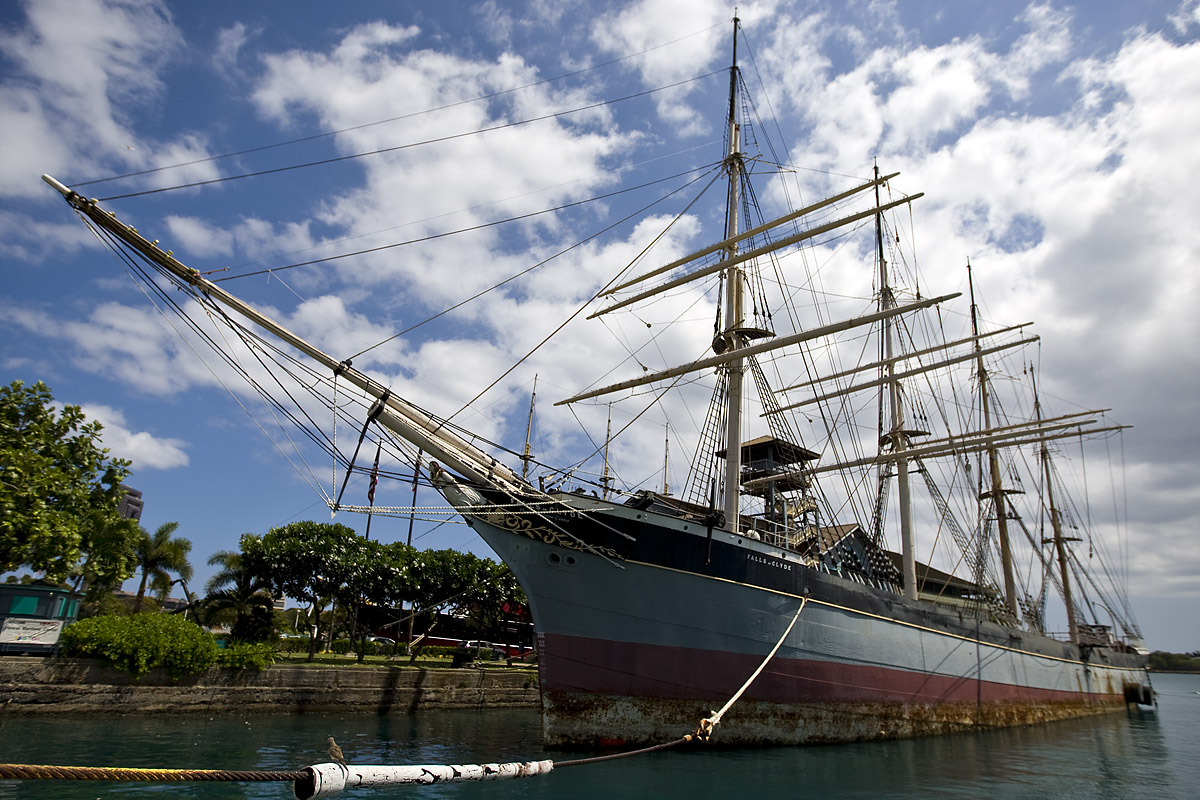
- Falls of Clyde at Honolulu in 2008

History
- Name: Falls of Clyde
- Namesake: Falls of Clyde, Lanarkshire
- Port of registry: 1879: (United Kingdom of Great Britain and Ireland) Glasgow; 1898: (Hawaii) Honolulu; 1907: (United States) San Francisco; 1968: (United States) Honolulu
- Builder: Russell & Co, Port Glasgow
- Yard number: 17
- Launched: December 12, 1878
- Completed: February 13, 1879
- Identification: IMO number: 8640313
- Fate: Scuttled on October 15, 2025

General characteristics
- Type: Iron-hulled sailing ship
- Tonnage: 1,807 GRT, 1,741 NRT
- Length: 266.1 ft (81.1 m)
- Beam: 40.0 ft (12.2 m)
- Depth: 23.5 ft (7.2 m)
- Sail plan: 4-masted full-rig
- Notes: Figurehead: a maiden
- Falls of Clyde (Four-masted oil tanker)
- Formerly listed on the U.S. National Register of Historic Places
- Former U.S. National Historic Landmark
- Built: 1878
- Architect: William Lithgow
- NRHP reference No.: 73000659

Significant dates
- Added to NRHP: July 2, 1973
- Designated NHL: April 11, 1989
- Removed from NRHP: February 2, 2024
- Delisted NHL: December 13, 2024

Falls of Clyde was the last surviving iron-hulled, four-masted full-rigged ship, and the last surviving sail-driven oil tanker. She was designated a U.S. National Historic Landmark in 1989, but deregistered in 2024 due to her condition. The ship was scuttled in 2025 off Oahu.

== History ==
Russell and Company built Falls of Clyde in Port Glasgow, Renfrewshire, Scotland. She was launched as the first of nine iron-hulled four-masted ships for Wright and Breakenridge's Falls Line. She was named after the Falls of Clyde, a group of waterfalls on the River Clyde, and built to the highest standard for general worldwide trade, Lloyd's Register A-1. Her maiden voyage took her to Karachi, then to British India, and her first six years were spent engaged in the India trade. She then became a tramp pursuing general cargo such as lumber, jute, cement, and wheat from ports in Australia, California, India, New Zealand, and the British Isles.

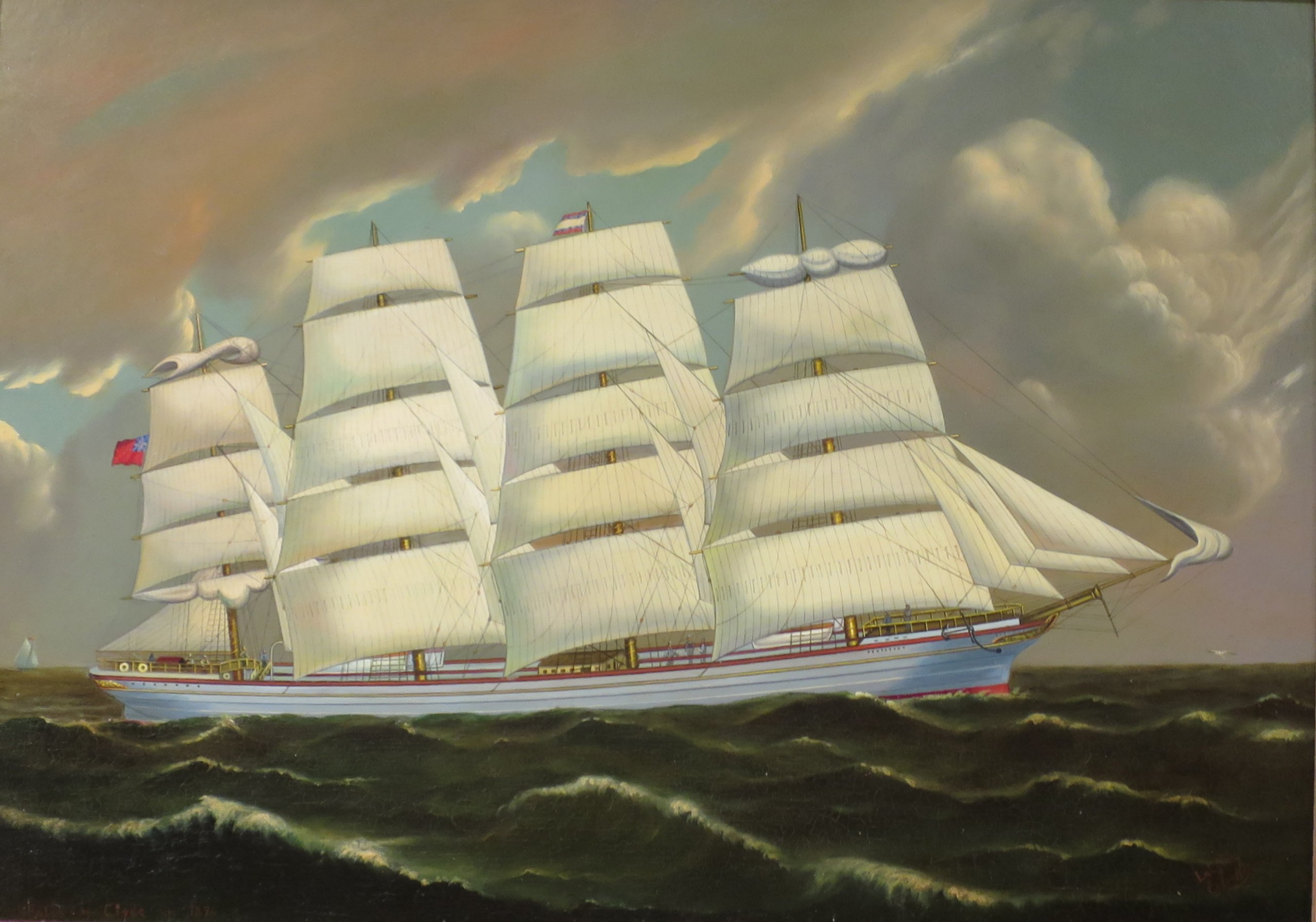
1896 painting of Falls of Clyde, when she was a British merchant ship

After twenty-one years as a British merchant ship, Falls of Clyde was bought for US$25,000 by Captain William Matson of the Matson Navigation Company, taken to Honolulu in 1899, and registered under the Hawaiian flag. When the Republic of Hawaii was annexed by the United States in 1900, it took a special act of the United States Congress to secure the foreign-built ship the right to sail as an American flag vessel.

To economize on crew, Matson rigged Falls of Clyde down as a barque, replacing the five yards on her (jigger) mast with two more easily managed fore-and-aft sails. At the same time, he added a deckhouse, charthouse, and rearranged the after quarters to accommodate paying passengers. From 1899 to 1907, she made over sixty voyages between Hilo, Hawaii, and San Francisco, California, carrying general merchandise west, sugar east, and passengers both ways. She developed a reputation as a handy, fast, and commodious vessel, averaging 17 days each way on her voyages.

In 1907, the Associated Oil Company (later Tidewater Oil) bought Falls of Clyde and converted her to a bulk oil tanker with a capacity of 19,000 barrels (3,000 m^{3}). Ten large steel tanks were built into her hull, and a pump room, boiler and generator fitted forward of an oil-tight bulkhead. In this configuration she brought kerosene to Hawaii and returned it to California with molasses for cattle feed.

In 1927, she was sold to the General Petroleum Company, her masts cut down, and converted into a floating fuel depot in Alaska. In 1959, she was bought by William Mitchell, who towed her to Seattle, Washington, intending to sell her to a preservation group. Mitchell's plan fell through and subsequent efforts by Karl Kortum, director of the San Francisco Maritime Museum, and Fred Klebingat, who had sailed in her as chief mate in 1915, to place her in Long Beach, California, or Los Angeles, California, were similarly disappointed.

In 1963, the bank holding the mortgage on Falls of Clyde decided to sell her to be sunk as part of a breakwater at Vancouver, British Columbia. Kortum and Klebingat aroused interest in the ship in Hawaii, and within days of the scheduled scuttling raised funds to buy the ship. At the end of October 1963, Falls of Clyde was taken under tow bound for Honolulu.

== As a museum ship ==
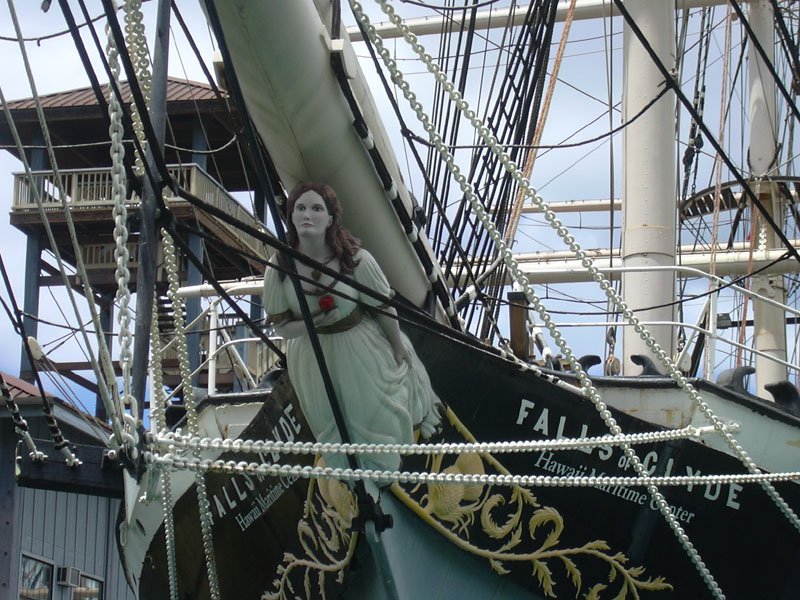
Detail of Falls of Clyde's prow

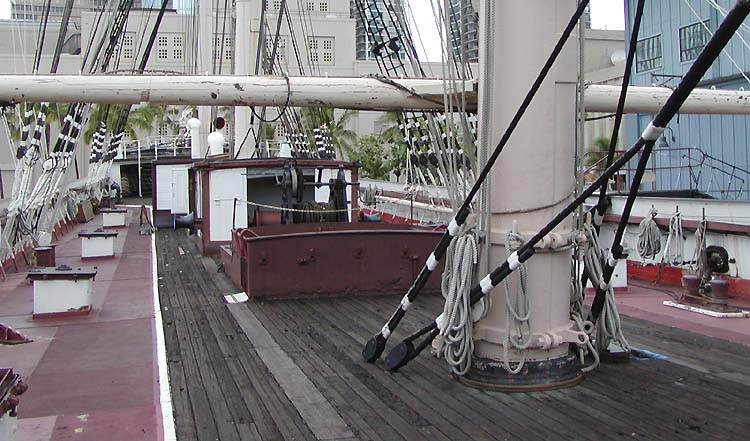
Looking forward along the deck

Falls of Clyde was given to the Bishop Museum and opened to the public in 1968. In 1970, shipbuilder and industrialist Sir William Lithgow, the grandson of original 19th-century designer William Lithgow, was engaged to assist in her restoration as a full-rigged ship. His Port Glasgow shipyard donated new steel masts, and topgallants, jib and spanker booms of Oregon pine.

In 1973, the ship was entered into the National Register of Historic Places, and declared a U.S. National Historic Landmark in 1989.

In 1982, the ship was seriously damaged in Hurricane Iwa. By 2008 she was in poor condition. Causes of the deterioration of the ship are multiple. The ship has not been dry docked for a long time and preventive maintenance has not been performed. The Bishop Museum, "has been accused of incompetence and dishonesty" for raising $600,000 to preserve the ship but then spending only about half that, and for other decisions on how the money that was spent.

In 2008, the Bishop Museum announced plans to sink her by the end of the year unless private funds were raised for an endowment for her perpetual care. In September 2008, the Bishop Museum was persuaded to transfer ownership to the non-profit group Friends of Falls of Clyde, which intended to restore her. Many artefacts and fixtures had previously been given away, taken, or otherwise disappeared on the assumption that the ship was to be scuttled. $350,000 was obtained from the Robert J. Pfeiffer Foundation, but hoped-for federal funds under the "Save America's Treasures" program or other programs did not come through. Each year, the foundation hoped to get her into drydock but did not succeed. In June 2016, Harbors Division of the Hawaii Department of Transportation (HDOT) revoked the permit for her to moor at Pier 7, citing safety and security risks to port users.

== Restoration and repatriation efforts ==
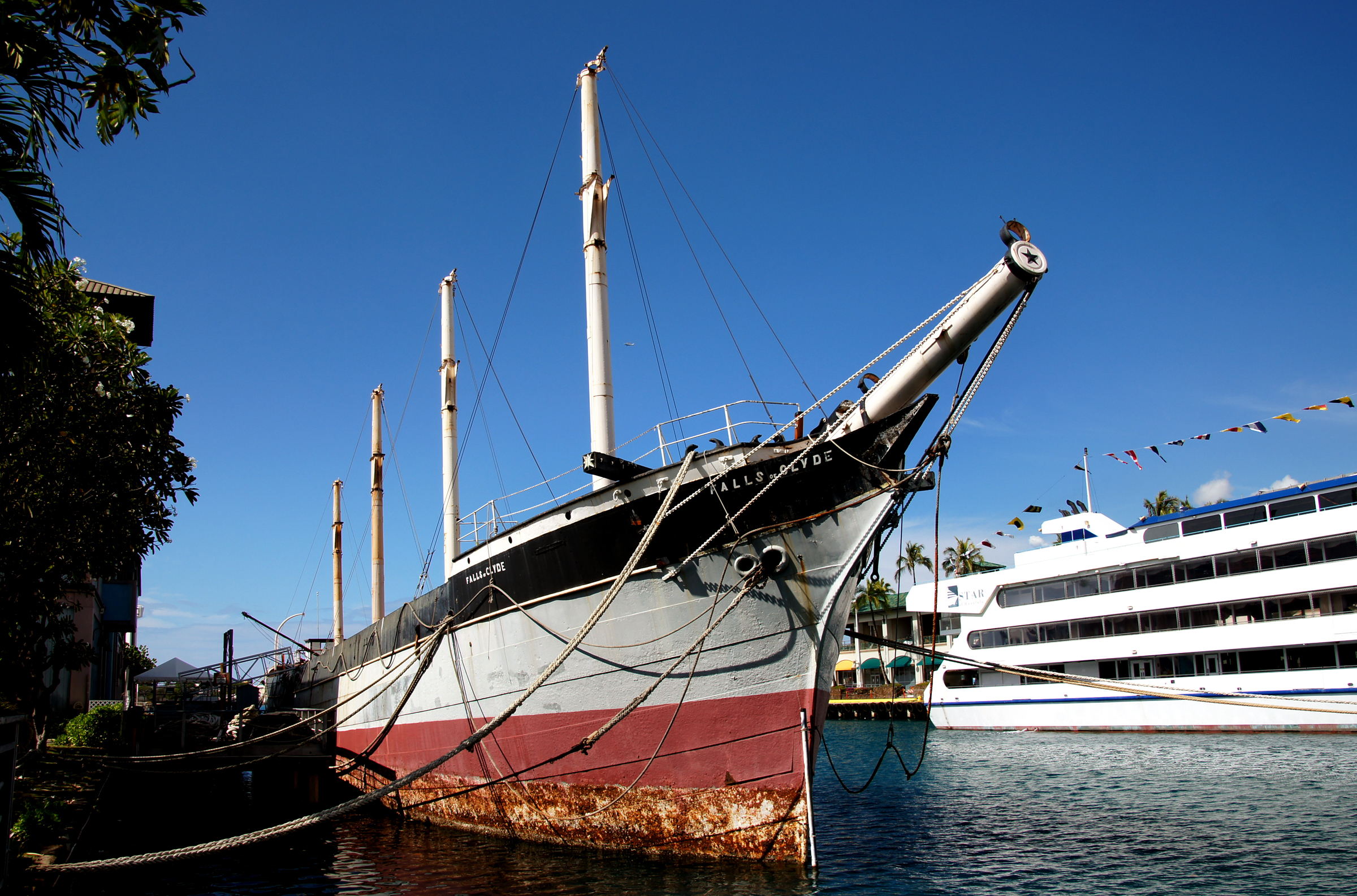
Falls of Clyde in 2013, with her masts reduced in height

In August 2016, a group based in Glasgow launched the Save Falls of Clyde – International (FOCI) Campaign, with a view to returning the vessel to Scotland. Initially, they answered a call for help from the charity known as the 'Friends of the Falls of Clyde' (FFOC) who owned and wanted to save the ship from being scuttled. A plan was put together with an attempt to work with HDOT and build and execute a plan.

In February 2019, HDOT put the ship up for auction; however, there were no qualified bids.

In July 2021, HDOT solicited bids for the removal of the ship from Honolulu Harbor and two proposals were received. The foundation challenged the Harbors Division's assessment of the ship, and said they never gave up ownership rights.

In November 2021, HDOT accepted a bid from FOCI to transport the ship to either Greenock or Glasgow where it would be restored. In March 2022, David O'Neill of FOCI said, "There's just a few legal and technical points to be ironed out, and then we will finalise the contract." HDOT canceled the bid in May 2022 after they said FOCI failed to meet conditions of the contract.

The state subsequently began the process of soliciting bids for scrapping the ship, and it was delisted from the Hawaiʻi Register of Historic Places. Delistings from the National Register of Historic Places and National Historic Landmarks programs were pending in early January 2024. The ship was delisted from the National Register on February 1, 2024, and its landmark designation was removed in December 2024.

== Scuttling ==
In the early morning of October 15, 2025, the ship was removed from Honolulu harbor by the Hawaii Department of Transportation, and towed to sea to be sunk at a deepwater site 25 miles (40 km) south of Oahu. The scuttling was completed by filling the ship using water hoses. After a short time the ship sank, stern first, in 12,500 feet (3,800 m) of water, 25 miles (40 km) south of Honolulu, at coordinates 21.151810°N 158.004100°W.

== In popular culture ==
- The ship appears as a filming location in Hawaii Five-O, season 10, episode 7, "Shake Hands with the Man on the Moon" (November 10, 1977) and season 12, episode 1, "A Lion in the Streets" (October 4, 1979).
- The ship appears as a filming location in Magnum, P.I., season 2, episodes 5 and 6, "Memories are Forever" (November 5, 1981) and season 6, episode 10, "Blood and Honor" (November 21, 1985).
