= Pouhala station =

Honolulu Skyline station

Pouhala Waipahu Transit Center
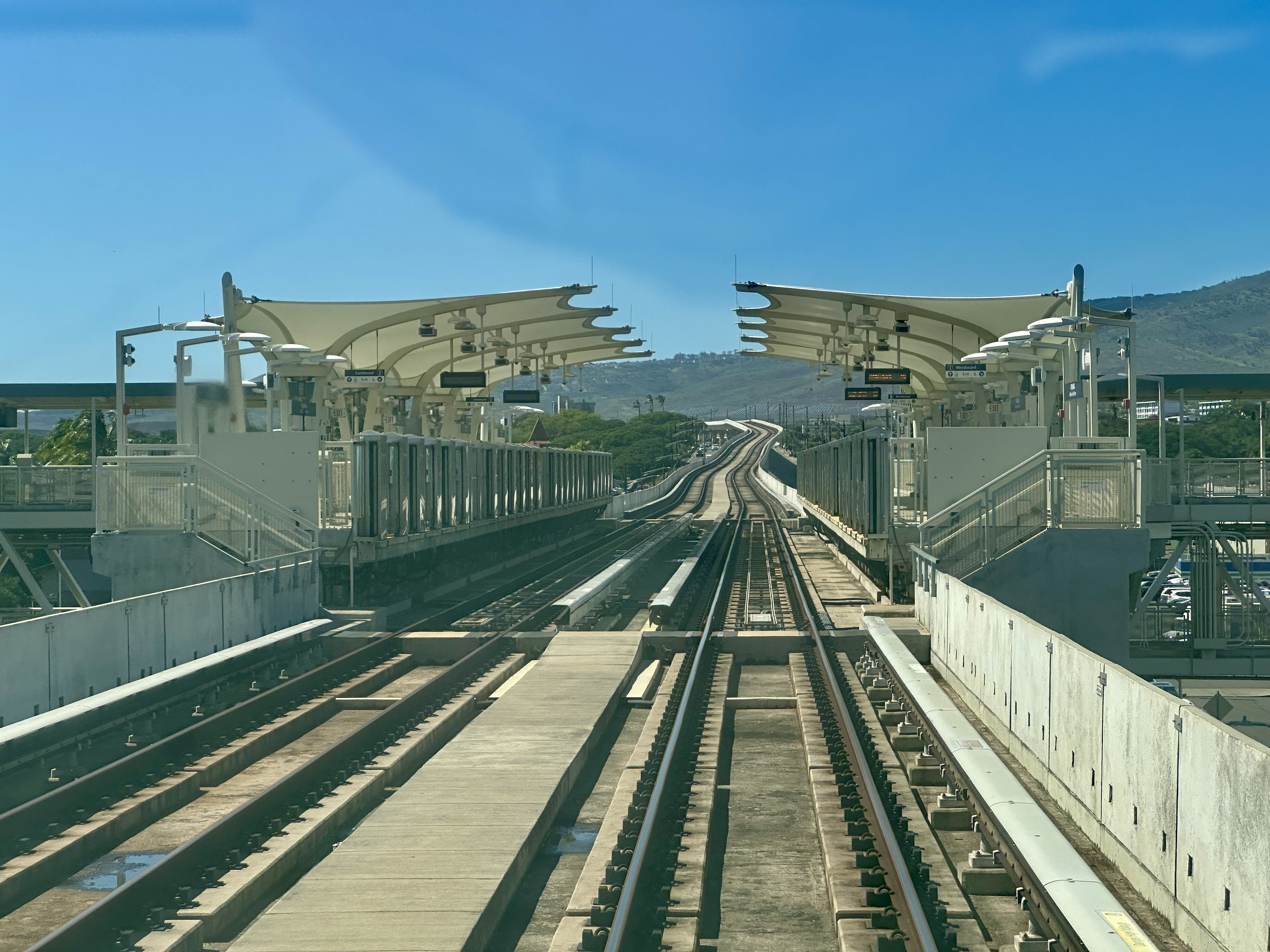
- Pouhala station in January 2025

General information
- Location: 94-818 Moloalo Street; Waipahu, Hawaiʻi
- Coordinates: 21°23′03″N 158°00′13″W
- Owner: Honolulu Department of Transportation Services
- Platforms: 2 side platforms
- Tracks: 2
- Bus stands: 9
- Connections: TheBus: E, 40, 42, 43, 99, 433, W1

Construction
- Structure type: Elevated
- Cycle facilities: Racks
- Accessible: Yes

History
- Opened: June 30, 2023; 3 years ago

Services
Preceding station	Skyline	Following station
Hōʻaeʻae toward Kualakaʻi	Skyline	Hālaulani toward Kahauiki
Location

Pouhala station (also known as the Waipahu Transit Center) is a Skyline metro station in Waipahu, Hawaiʻi. It opened on June 30, 2023.

In Hawaiian, "pouhala" means "pandanus post or pillar" and is the name of a former historically-important fishpond in the area and land division near Pearl Harbor, which today serves as a 70-acre wetland habitat for birds. The Hawaiian Station Name Working Group proposed Hawaiian names for the nine rail stations on the ʻEwa end of the rail system (stations west of and including Aloha Stadium) in November 2017, and HART adopted the proposed names on February 22, 2018.

== Service ==
Skyline trains run every 10 minutes. Service operates from 5 a.m. to 7 p.m. on weekdays and from 8 a.m. to 7 p.m. on weekends and holidays.

== Station information ==
When all 19 stations are open in 2031, Pouhala is projected to rank 10th in boardings at 3,520 per day.

The majority of riders are expected to connect to the station via TheBus and Waipahu Transit Center which was renovated in 2020. The bus transfer hub provides five bays for nearly two dozen express and regular bus routes connecting to rail line.

The Skyline Rail Operations Center is located northeast of the station.

== Surrounding area ==
The station is located near many car-focused business, including gas stations, car dealerships, and rental facilities, along with other local businesses such as the Highway Inn restaurant. The environment has been described as "not conducive to pedestrians and bicyclists".

Transit-oriented development within a half-mile radius around the station is expected to serve as a magnet for 2,370 new homes in coming years. 3.5 acres of nearby land owned by Kamehameha Schools is expected to be developed into 530 affordable-housing units and 50,000 square feet of commercial space, and a separate two-tower project named Keawalau at Waipahu is expected to begin construction in 2025.
