= Kalauao station =

Honolulu Skyline station

Kalauao Pearlridge
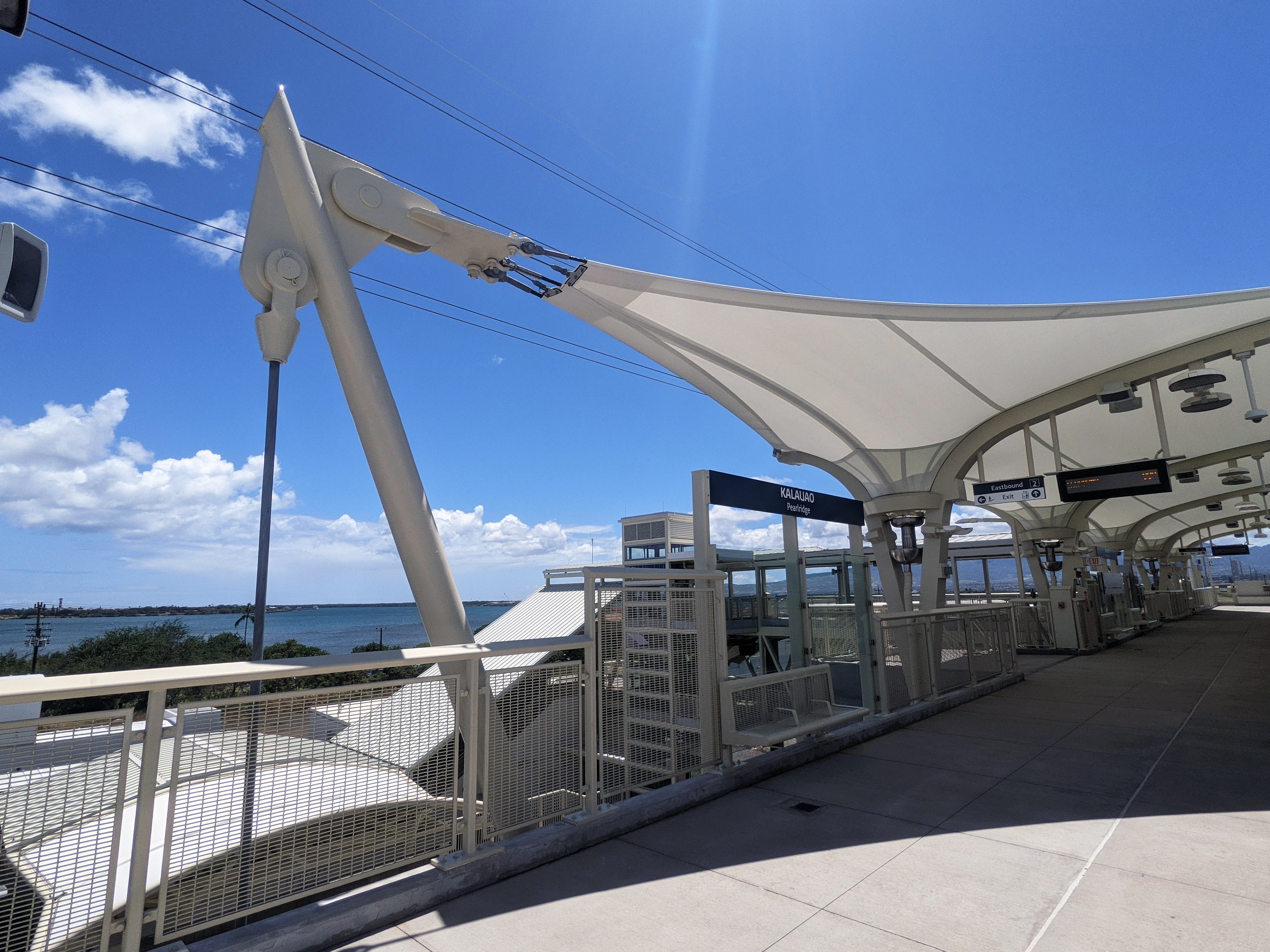
- View from the station platform in June 2023

General information
- Location: 98-80 Kamehameha Highway; Waimalu, Hawaiʻi
- Coordinates: 21°23′02″N 157°56′51″W
- Owner: Honolulu Department of Transportation Services
- Platforms: 2 side platforms
- Tracks: 2
- Connections: TheBus: 32, 40, 42, 51, 53, 541, 542, 544, 545

Construction
- Structure type: Elevated
- Parking: 16 spaces
- Cycle facilities: Racks
- Accessible: Yes

History
- Opened: June 30, 2023; 3 years ago

Services
Preceding station	Skyline	Following station
Waiawa toward Kualakaʻi	Skyline	Hālawa toward Kahauiki
Location

Kalauao station (also known as Pearlridge station) is a Skyline metro station in Waimalu, Hawaiʻi, serving the Pearlridge Center shopping mall. The station is located in the median of Kamehameha Highway above its intersection with Kaonohi Street. It opened on June 30, 2023 with a temporary 16-space park and ride lot.

In Hawaiian, kalauao means "the multitude of clouds" and is the name of the ahupuaʻa in which it is located. The Hawaiian Station Name Working Group proposed Hawaiian names for the nine rail stations on the ʻEwa end of the rail system (stations west of and including Aloha Stadium) in November 2017, and HART adopted the proposed names on February 22, 2018. The Hawaiian name initially proposed for the station, Puʻuloa, means "long hill" and refers to an ʻili that marked the entrance to the bays of Puʻuloa.

== Service ==
Skyline trains run every 10 minutes. Service operates from 5 a.m. to 7 p.m. on weekdays and from 8 a.m. to 7 p.m. on weekends and holidays.

== Station information ==
When all 19 stations are open in 2031, Kalauao is projected to rank third in boardings at 6,290 per day.

Its expected high use is due to riders of TheBus transferring to and from rail at the station, along with population growth in the nearby area and a strengthening workforce produced by dense commercial and residential property development plans within a half-mile of the station.

Public art is present at the station via the Station Art Program. Two glass mosaics titled Pukana Lā Ma Oʻahu (Oʻahu Sunrise) and Napoʻo ʻAna O Lā Ma Oʻahu (Oʻahu Sunset) by artist Robert Kushner are viewable at both entrances and depict the Waimalu aquifer providing sustenance to crops such as taro, rice, and watercress.

== Surrounding area ==
The 1.1 million square foot Pearlridge Center is located a seven minute walk from the station. Nearby development plans include the construction of between 1,500 and 3,000 homes on land partially owned by Kamehameha Schools, a hotel, and additional retail space.

A new transit center south of the station, with six bus bays and covered waiting areas, is planned as a future addition. The City and County of Honolulu estimates an additional 3,400 homes of 8,874 residents can be built within a ten minute walk of the station as part of long-term transit-oriented development projects.
