= Hālawa station =

Honolulu Skyline station

Hālawa Aloha Stadium
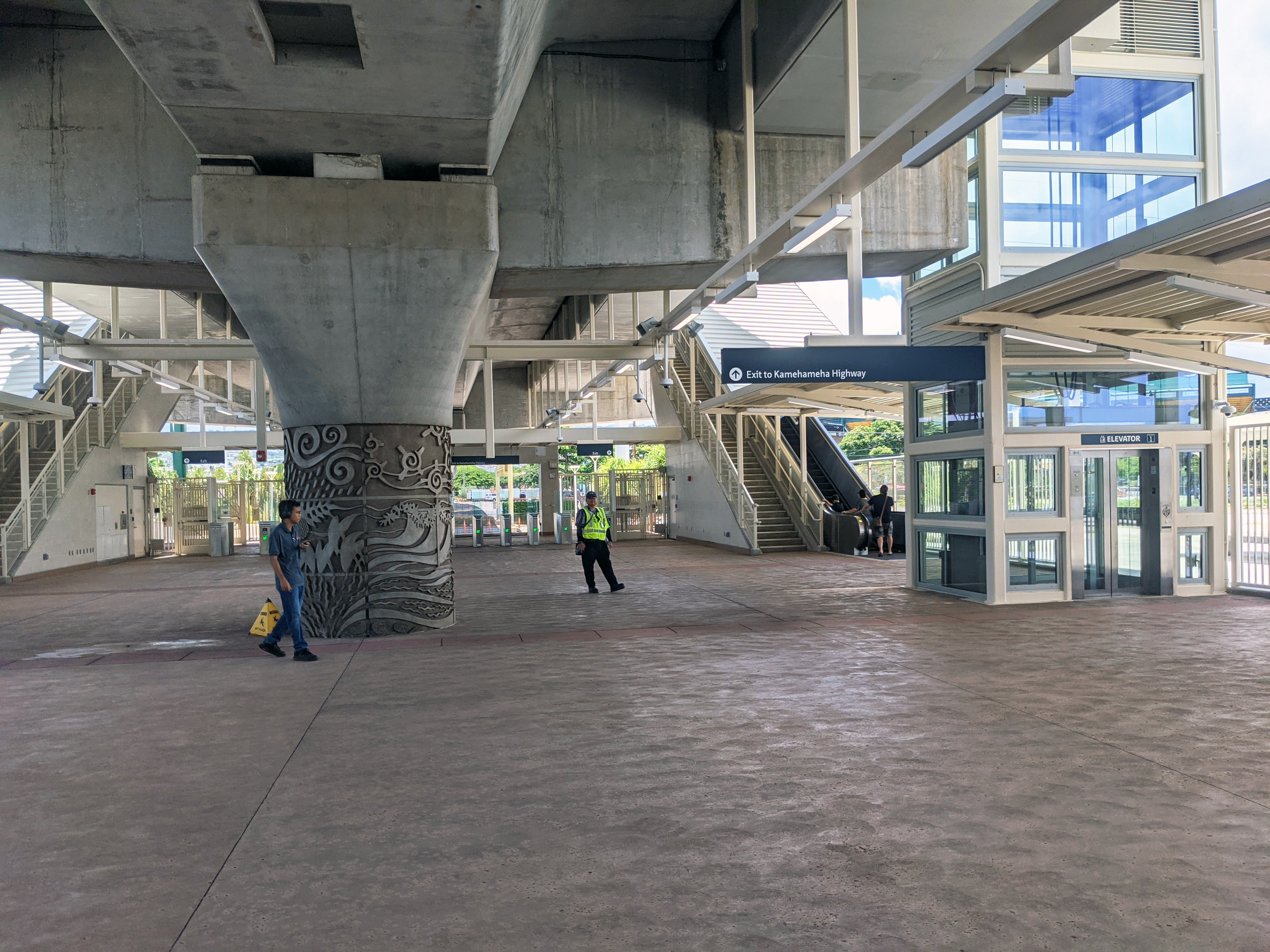
- The ground floor of Hālawa station

General information
- Location: 99-232 Kamehameha Highway; Hālawa, Hawaiʻi
- Coordinates: 21°22′15″N 157°56′03″W
- Owner: Honolulu Department of Transportation Services
- Platforms: 2 side platforms
- Tracks: 2
- Connections: TheBus: 1L, 32, 40, 42, 51, 551, 552, PH1, PH2, PH3, PH4, PH7

Construction
- Structure type: Elevated
- Parking: 590 spaces
- Cycle facilities: Racks
- Accessible: Yes

History
- Opened: June 30, 2023; 3 years ago

Services
Preceding station	Skyline	Following station
Kalauao toward Kualakaʻi	Skyline	Makalapa toward Kahauiki
Location

Hālawa station (also known as Aloha Stadium station) is a Skyline metro station in Hālawa, Hawaiʻi, serving Aloha Stadium, ʻAiea, Salt Lake, and Moanalua. The station is located alongside Kamehameha Highway above its intersection with Salt Lake Boulevard. It served as the eastern terminus of the initial rail system after it opened on June 30, 2023, until October 16, 2025, with the extension of Skyline to Kahauiki station. The station has a 590-space park and ride lot.

Buses provide services along the future right of way via the adjacent bus bay. TheBus Route A CityExpress! provides express service between Hālawa station, Downtown Honolulu, the Ala Moana Center, and the University of Hawaiʻi at Mānoa every 10 minutes, timed with the arrival of trains. Route 1L provides limited stop service between this station and East Honolulu via King Street and Waiʻalae Avenue, including stops at Middle Street–Kalihi Transit Center and Kahala Mall. Routes 20 and PH8 provide service between this station and Joint Base Pearl Harbor–Hickam, with route 20 continuing on to the Daniel K. Inouye International Airport, Downtown Honolulu, and Waikīkī.

In Hawaiian, "hālawa" means "curve" and is the name of the ahupuaʻa in which it is located, the easternmost in the ʻEwa District. The Hawaiian Station Name Working Group proposed Hawaiian names for the nine rail stations on the ʻEwa end of the rail system (stations west of and including Aloha Stadium) in November 2017, and HART adopted the proposed names on February 22, 2018.

== Service ==
Skyline trains run every 10 minutes. Service operates from 5 a.m. to 7 p.m. on weekdays and from 8 a.m. to 7 p.m. on weekends and holidays.

== Station information ==
When all 19 stations are open in 2031, Hālawa is projected to rank sixth in boardings at 4,500 per day.

The station houses a storage track, allowing for the deployment of extra trains for handling large events at nearby venues. The majority of passengers using the station and its park and ride facilities are expected to come from ʻAiea, Halawa Heights, Aliamanu, Foster Village, Salt Lake, and other nearby communities.

== Surrounding area ==
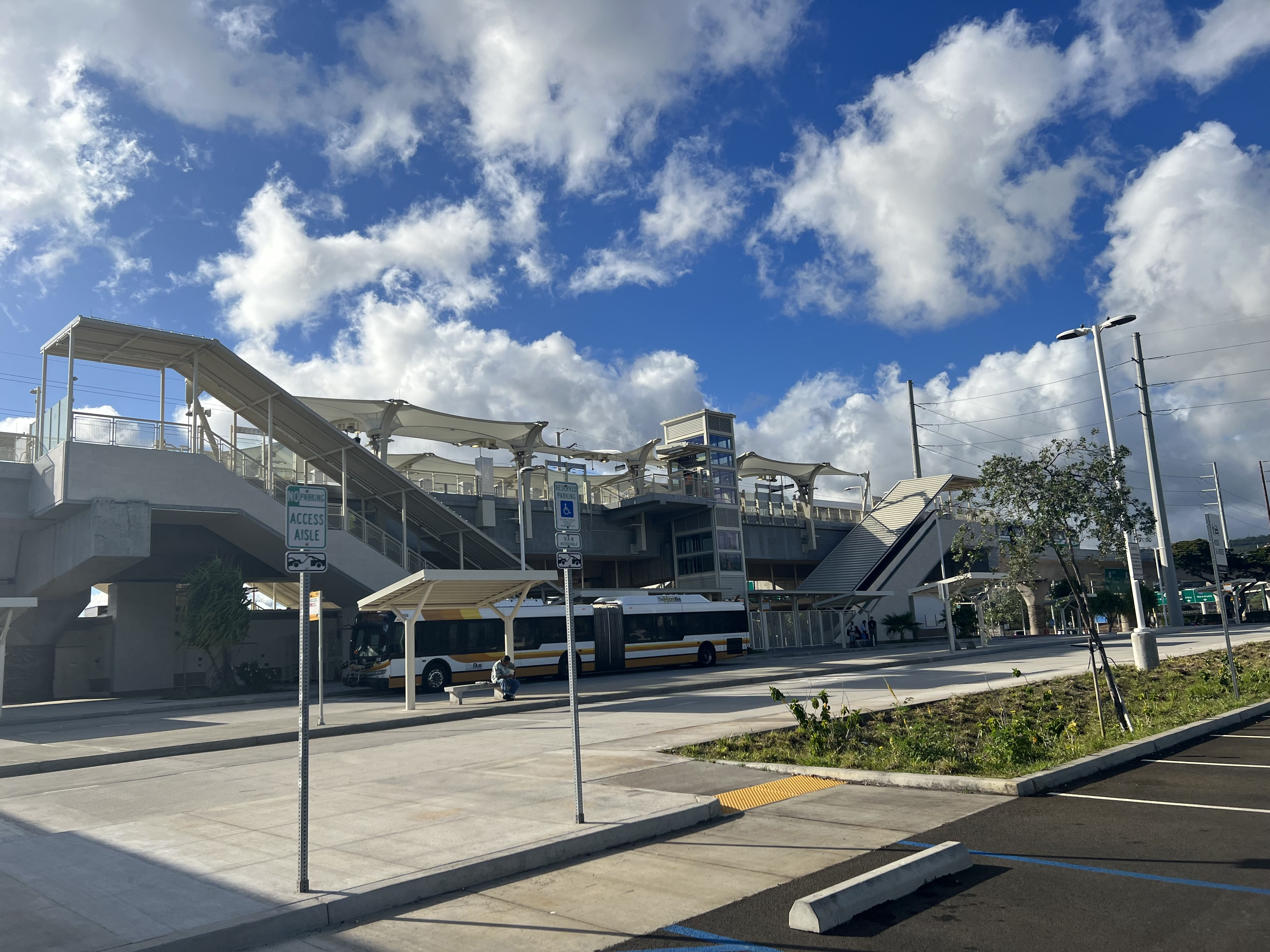
Station building and bus bay, as seen from the park and ride lot off Salt Lake Boulevard

The closed multipurpose Aloha Stadium is located adjacent to the station, the parking lots of which house numerous events including the weekly outdoor Aloha Stadium Swap Meet, featuring over 400 vendors and drawing in over one million annual visitors. The City and County of Honolulu expects future mixed-use development in the area to integrate the station with 1,810 new homes, 192,000 square feet of retail, 620 hotel rooms, and 192,000 square feet of office space, anchored by a new stadium with an estimated completion date was pushed to March 2029. Further higher-density redevelopment is being considered around ʻAiea Elementary School, Stadium Mall, Stadium Marketplace, and the Puuwai Momi public housing complex.
