= Hālaulani station =

Honolulu Skyline station

Hālaulani Leeward Community College
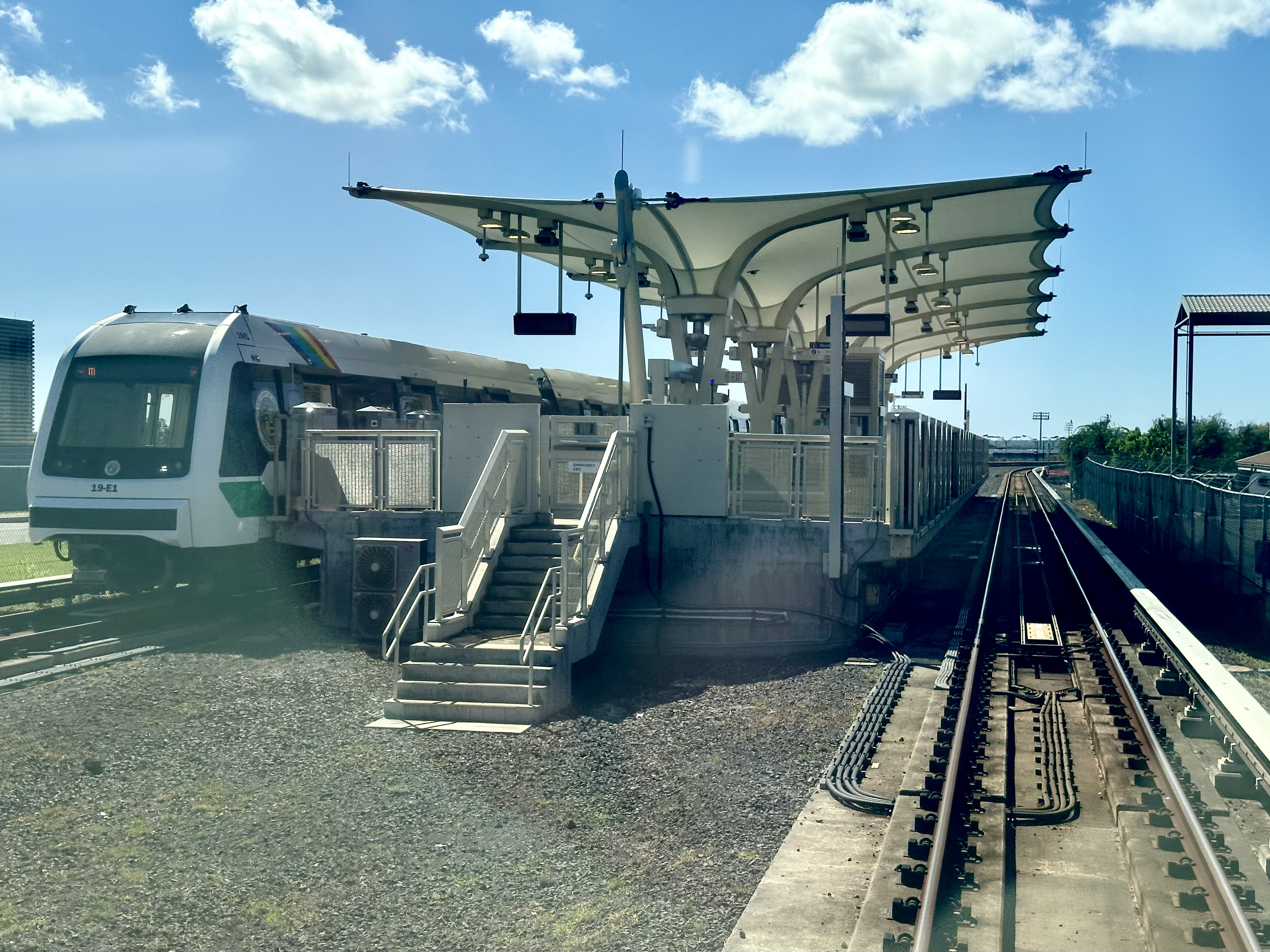
- Hālaulani station in January 2025

General information
- Location: 96-47 Ala ʻIke Street; Pearl City, Hawaiʻi
- Coordinates: 21°23′40″N 157°59′09″W
- Owner: Honolulu Department of Transportation Services
- Platforms: 1 island platform
- Tracks: 2

Construction
- Structure type: At-grade
- Cycle facilities: Racks
- Accessible: Yes

History
- Opened: June 30, 2023; 3 years ago

Services
Preceding station	Skyline	Following station
Pouhala toward Kualakaʻi	Skyline	Waiawa toward Kahauiki
Location

Hālaulani station (also known as Leeward Community College station) is a Skyline metro station in Pearl City, Hawaiʻi, serving the Leeward Community College campus. The station is located alongside Ala ʻIke Street and can be accessed from a building on the college campus, with passengers using a tunnel to travel under Ala ʻIke Street and the eastbound track. It is the only station on the system not built on elevated tracks. It opened on June 30, 2023.

In Hawaiian, "hālaulani" means "heavenly hālau, chief’s house, name of a star" and is the name of the ʻili (ahupuaʻa division) in which it is located. The Hawaiian Station Name Working Group proposed Hawaiian names for the nine rail stations on the ʻEwa end of the rail system (stations west of and including Aloha Stadium) in November 2017, and HART adopted the proposed names on February 22, 2018.

== Service ==
Skyline trains run every 10 minutes. Service operates from 5 a.m. to 7 p.m. on weekdays and from 8 a.m. to 7 p.m. on weekends and holidays.

== Station information ==
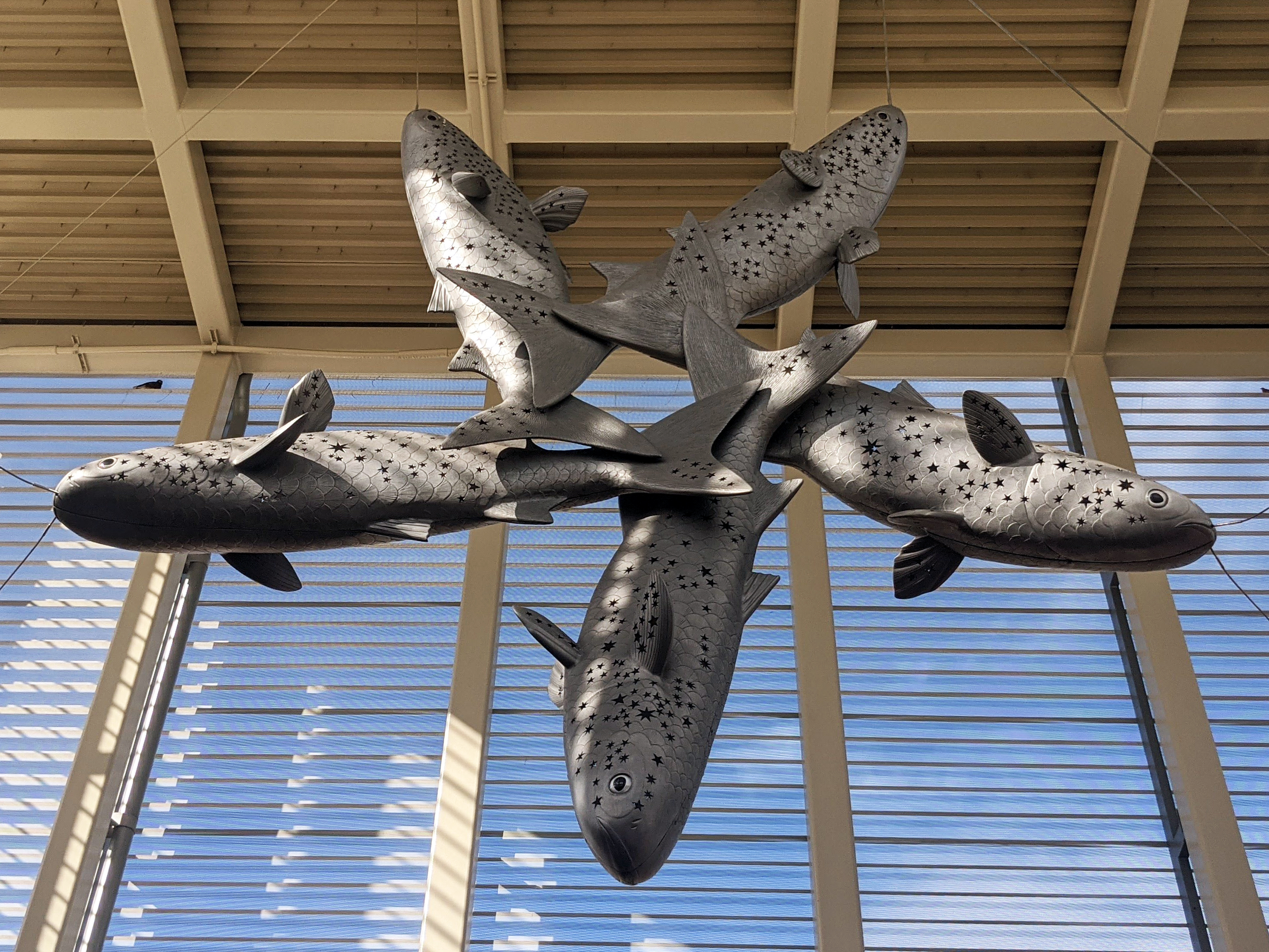
He Kauhulu ʻAnae by Donald Lipski

When all 19 stations are open in 2031, Hālaulani is projected to see 1,450 boardings per day, reflecting its relatively physically isolated location at a community college with decreasing enrollment and sparsely populated surroundings, along with the lack of a public-access park and ride or bus transit center. The 1,200-spot park and ride at Leeward Community College is for students, staff, and faculty only.

The station is the only at-grade component of the Skyline rail network and is the only station accessed via a tunnel.

Public art is present at the station via the Station Art Program. A metalized fiberglass sculpture hangs above the entrance, titled He Kauhulu ʻAnae (A Gathering of Mullets) by artist Donald Lipski. It depicts mullets from the historical loko iʻa (fishponds) in the region, inspired by the legend of Miahea, who asked the gods Kāne and Kanaloa for prosperity; in response, standing at Hāʻupu (now known as LCC), they gave a chant: "May the fish ponds down at Waiawa be as the stars in the sky above."

The Skyline Rail Operations Center is located immediately east of the station.

== Surrounding area ==
College Gardens, a 119-unit townhome complex, is adjacent to Leeward Community College (LCC) and the station. Single-family homes also exist in the area. The City and County of Honolulu has announced tentative plans to build a "college-oriented neighborhood" of an additional 820 homes in the area.

North of the station is a Hawaiian Electric substation and a busy highway interchange, the meeting point of the Interstate H-1 and H-2, described by the Star-Advertiser in June 2023 as "a twisted mess of roads."
