= Lelepaua station =

Honolulu Skyline station

Lelepaua Daniel K. Inouye International Airport
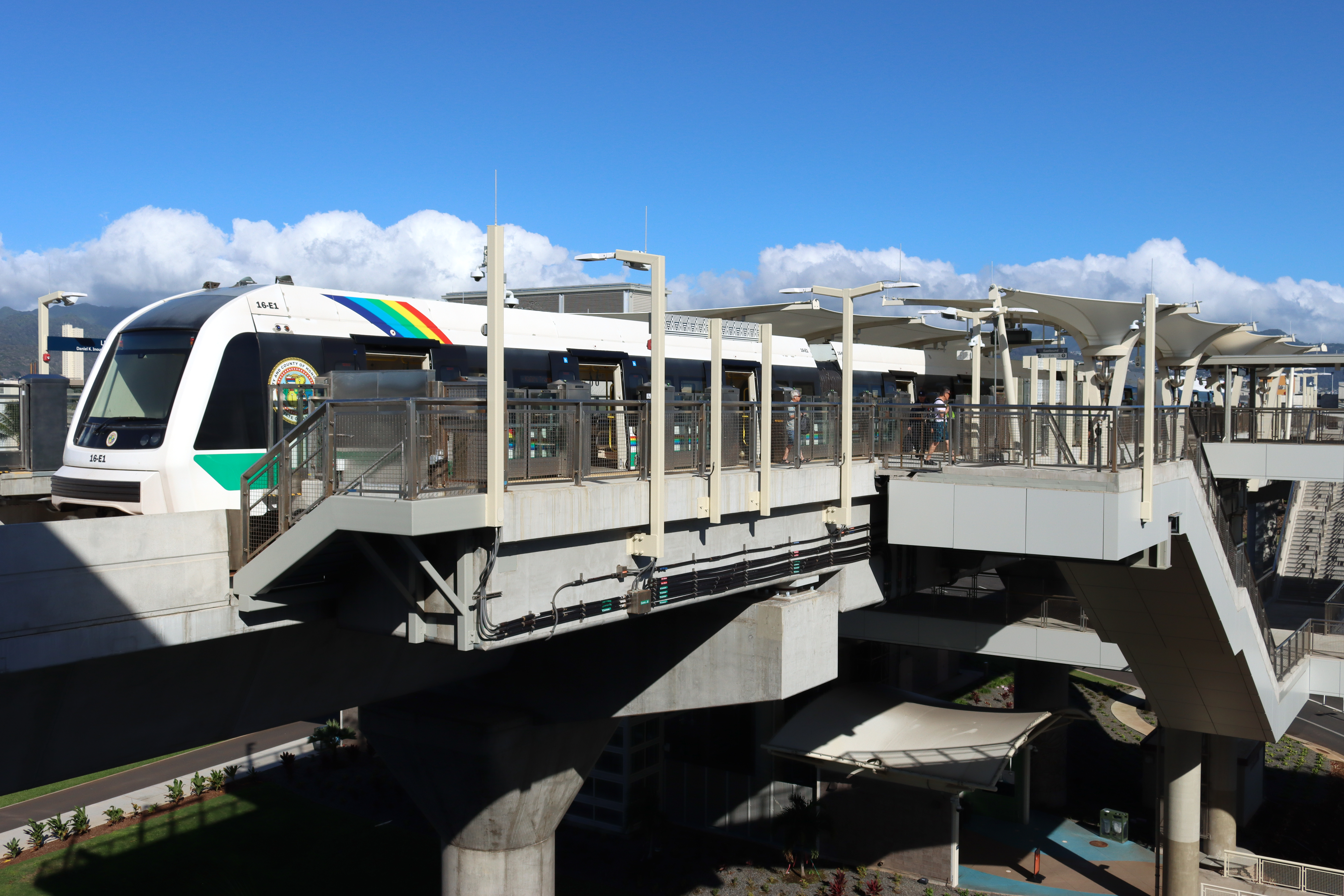
- Eastbound platform with a train unloading passengers

General information
- Location: Ala Onaona St & Ala ‘Auana St; Honolulu, Hawaiʻi
- Coordinates: 21°20′03″N 157°55′15″W
- Owner: Honolulu Department of Transportation Services
- Platforms: 2 side platforms
- Tracks: 2
- Connections: ✈ Daniel K. Inouye International Airport; TheBus: W

Construction
- Structure type: Elevated
- Accessible: Yes

History
- Opened: October 16, 2025; 10 months ago

Services
Preceding station	Skyline	Following station
Makalapa toward Kualakaʻi	Skyline	Āhua toward Kahauiki
Location

Lelepaua station (also known as Daniel K. Inouye International Airport station) is a Skyline station along Ala Auana Street serving the Daniel K. Inouye International Airport in Honolulu, Hawaiʻi. It was built as part of Segment 2 of the Skyline route which opened on October 16, 2025.

The Hawaiian Station Name Working Group proposed Hawaiian names for the twelve rail stations on the eastern end of the rail system (stations in the Airport and City Center segments) in April 2019. The name of this station, Lelepaua, means the choice mother of pearl inside the pāua bivalve and refers to a large fishpond and salt production area built by Kaʻihikapu Manuia.

== Station information ==
The station is built between the overseas and international parking structures, and it features accessible pedestrian access, bicycle parking, elevators and stairs to connect with the platforms, pedestrian bridges and walkways to connect with the airport terminals, restrooms, and bus connections.

The station is also served by the W Line, operated by TheBus, providing express service to and from Downtown Honolulu and Waikīkī. Additionally, TheBus routes 40, 42, 51 serve the station after 10:30PM when trains stop operating for the day.

=== Travel time ===
- 26 minutes to East Kapolei Station
- 5 minutes to Aloha Stadium Station
- 12 minutes to Downtown Station
- 16 Minutes to Ala Moana Center Station
