= Waiawa station =

Honolulu Skyline station

Waiawa Pearl Highlands
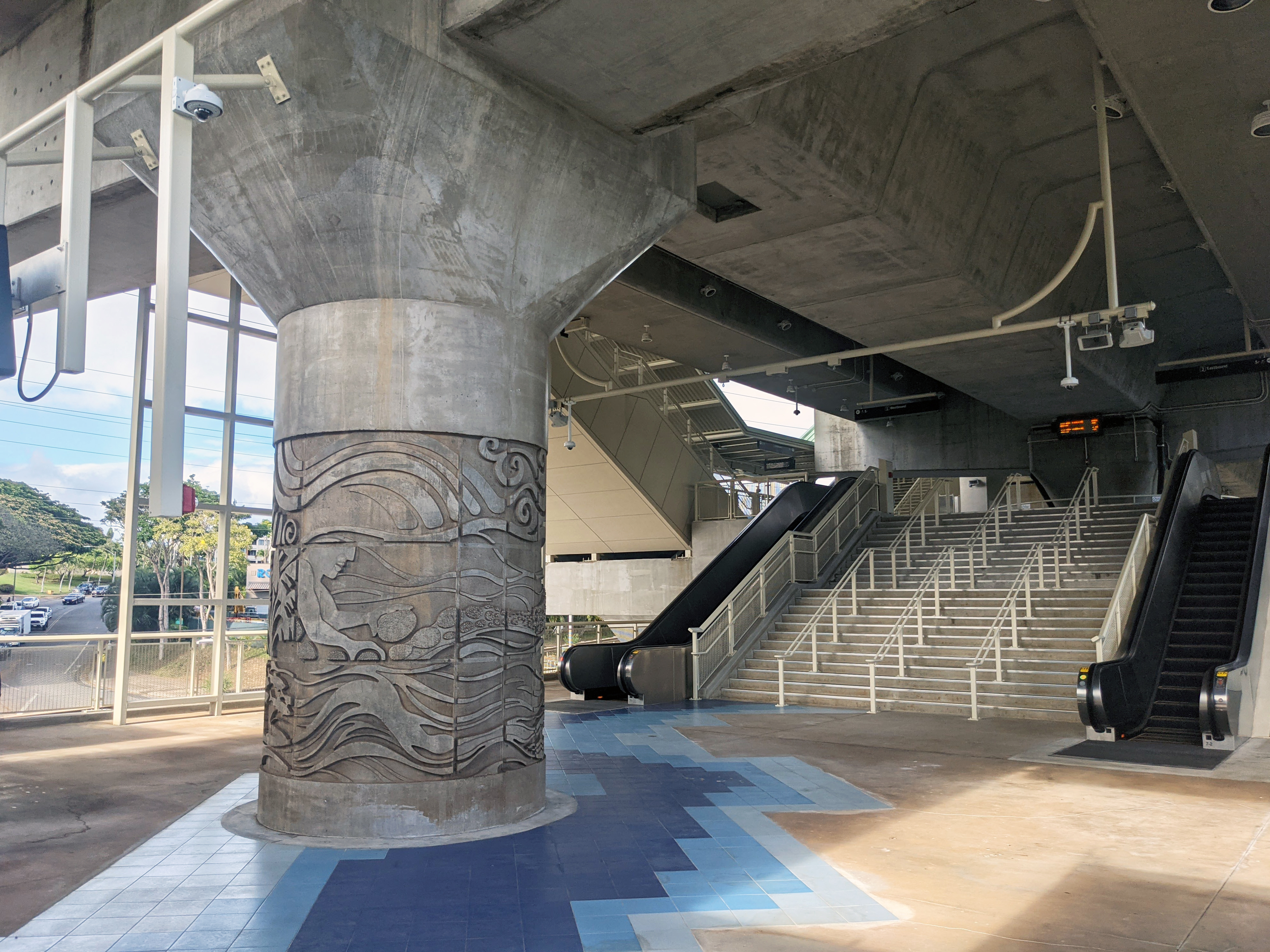
- The entrance to Waiawa station

General information
- Location: 96-249 Kamehameha Highway; Pearl City, Hawaiʻi
- Coordinates: 21°23′47″N 157°58′47″W
- Owner: Honolulu Department of Transportation Services
- Platforms: 2 side platforms
- Tracks: 2
- Connections: TheBus: 43, 51, 531, 532, 533, 535

Construction
- Structure type: Elevated
- Accessible: Yes

History
- Opened: June 30, 2023; 3 years ago

Services
Preceding station	Skyline	Following station
Hālaulani toward Kualakaʻi	Skyline	Kalauao toward Kahauiki
Location

Waiawa station (also known as Pearl Highlands station) is a Skyline metro station in Pearl City, Hawaiʻi, serving the Pearl Highlands Center shopping mall. The station is located alongside Kamehameha Highway near its intersection with Kuala Street and is the main arterial connection for Skyline riders from Central Oʻahu and the North Shore, including Waipio, Mililani, Wahiawa and Haleʻiwa. It opened on June 30, 2023.

In Hawaiian, "waiawa" means "milkfish water" and is the name of the ahupuaʻa in which it is located, referring to the fact it housed multiple fishponds and comprises the largest watershed on Oʻahu. The Hawaiian Station Name Working Group proposed Hawaiian names for the nine rail stations on the ʻEwa end of the rail system (stations west of and including Aloha Stadium) in November 2017, and HART adopted the proposed names on February 22, 2018.

== Service ==
Skyline trains run every 10 minutes. Service operates from 5 a.m. to 7 p.m. on weekdays and from 8 a.m. to 7 p.m. on weekends and holidays.

== Park and ride construction issues ==
The initial plans for the system called for a 1,600-space park and ride garage to be built at the station with direct access ramps to Interstate H-2 to provide convenient access for rail passengers from Central Oʻahu and the North Shore, the largest park and ride along the entire rail line. However, because of the station's location over a stream, the garage and its connecting highway on- and off-ramps would have cost $330 million to build ($206,000 per stall), which was deemed excessive by the Honolulu Authority for Rapid Transportation (HART) and indefinitely deferred. However, due to its location and connections with various TheBus routes, HART predicts the station will still see high usage, and city officials predicted the lack of a garage "won’t significantly affect rail ridership". The lack of completion of the garage is predicted to affect systemwide daily boardings by 1.7%, or a 1,500 passenger per day decrease.

== Station information ==
When all 19 stations are open in 2031, Waiawa is projected to rank second in boardings at 9,685 per day, assuming the completed construction of the park and ride garage.

It is estimated that 60% of riders will get to or from station via TheBus.

== Surrounding area ==
The station is within walking distance of a Sam’s Club store, Regal Cinemas, The Home Depot, Walmart, housed in the adjacent 411,000-square-foot Pearl Highlands Center. Century Park Plaza, a 47-story condominium tower, is located west of the Pearl Highlands Center, and homes in the Manana housing complex are also nearby.

The station currently lacks pedestrian-friendly access, requiring riders to walk along the divided Kamehameha Highway and use a crosswalk to reach nearby stores. The City and County of Honolulu and Hawaii Public Housing Authority nonetheless anticipate future transit-oriented development in the area, including the development of 1,500 homes and 1.1 million square feet of retail, office, and industrial business spaces within a half-mile of the station. Kamehameha Schools additionally intends to develop 2,000 acres between Pearl City and Waipio into a community with 11,109 homes, five public schools, and more than 500,000 square feet of commercial space over 50 years, beginning as early as 2033.
