= Hōʻaeʻae station =

Honolulu Skyline station

Hōʻaeʻae West Loch
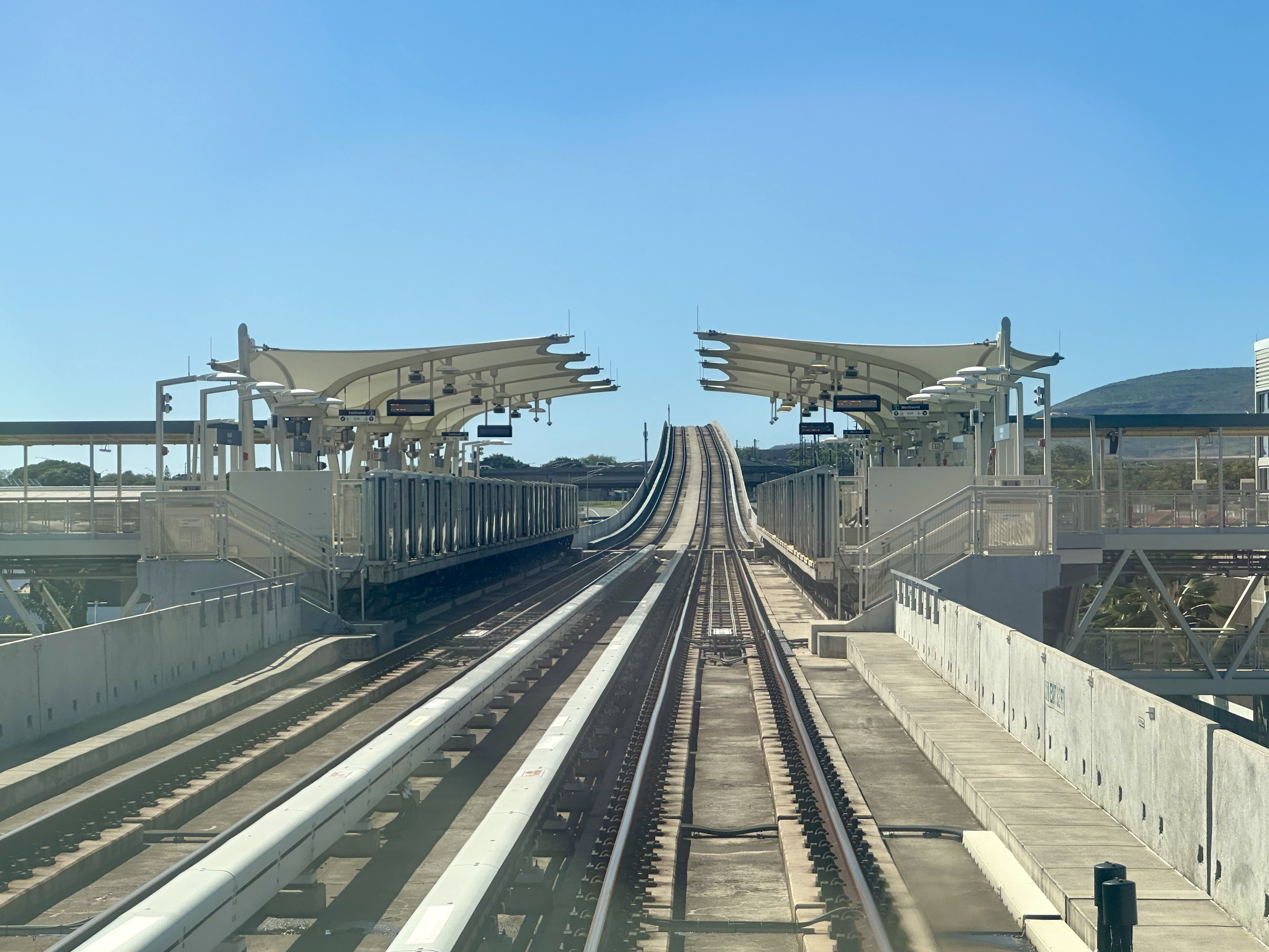
- Hōʻaeʻae station in January 2025

General information
- Location: 94-135 Farrington Highway; Waipahu, Hawaiʻi
- Coordinates: 21°22′41″N 158°01′22″W
- Owner: Honolulu Department of Transportation Services
- Platforms: 2 side platforms
- Tracks: 2
- Connections: TheBus: E, 40, 42, 43, 44, 81, 99, 444, W1

Construction
- Structure type: Elevated
- Parking: 21 spaces
- Accessible: Yes

History
- Opened: June 30, 2023; 3 years ago

Services
Preceding station	Skyline	Following station
Honouliuli toward Kualakaʻi	Skyline	Pouhala toward Kahauiki
Location

Hōʻaeʻae station (also known as West Loch station) is a Skyline metro station in Waipahu, Hawaiʻi. It opened on June 30, 2023 along with its temporary 21-space park and ride lot.

In Hawaiian, "hōʻaeʻae" means "to make soft or fine" and is the name of the ahupuaʻa in which it is located. The Hawaiian Station Name Working Group proposed Hawaiian names for the nine rail stations on the ʻEwa end of the rail system (stations west of and including Aloha Stadium) in November 2017, and HART adopted the proposed names on February 22, 2018.

== Service ==
Skyline trains run every 10 minutes. Service operates from 5 a.m. to 7 p.m. on weekdays and from 8 a.m. to 7 p.m. on weekends and holidays.

== Station information ==
When all 19 stations are open in 2031, Hōʻaeʻae is projected to rank 4th in boardings at 4,690 per day.

== Surrounding area ==
The station primarily serves the greater ʻEwa Beach community, largely via TheBus and drop-off connections. It is located on Farrington Highway less than half a mile from Fort Weaver Road, a 6-mile-long major east-west thoroughfare for residents of West Loch Estates, ʻEwa Villages, ʻEwa Gentry, Ocean Pointe, Hoakalei Resort, ʻEwa Beach, and Iroquois Point. The station is also predicted to be used by residents of Royal Kunia and the Village Park area.

The north-facing station exit provides access to the store parking lot of multiple retail complexes, including the 20-tenant Shops at West Loch Station. In the future, the area surrounding the station is planned to be converted into medium and high-density mixed-use communities, with a pedestrian-oriented "main street" running from the station to the edge of Pearl Harbor.
