= Makalapa station =

Honolulu Skyline station

Makalapa Joint Base Pearl Harbor–Hickam
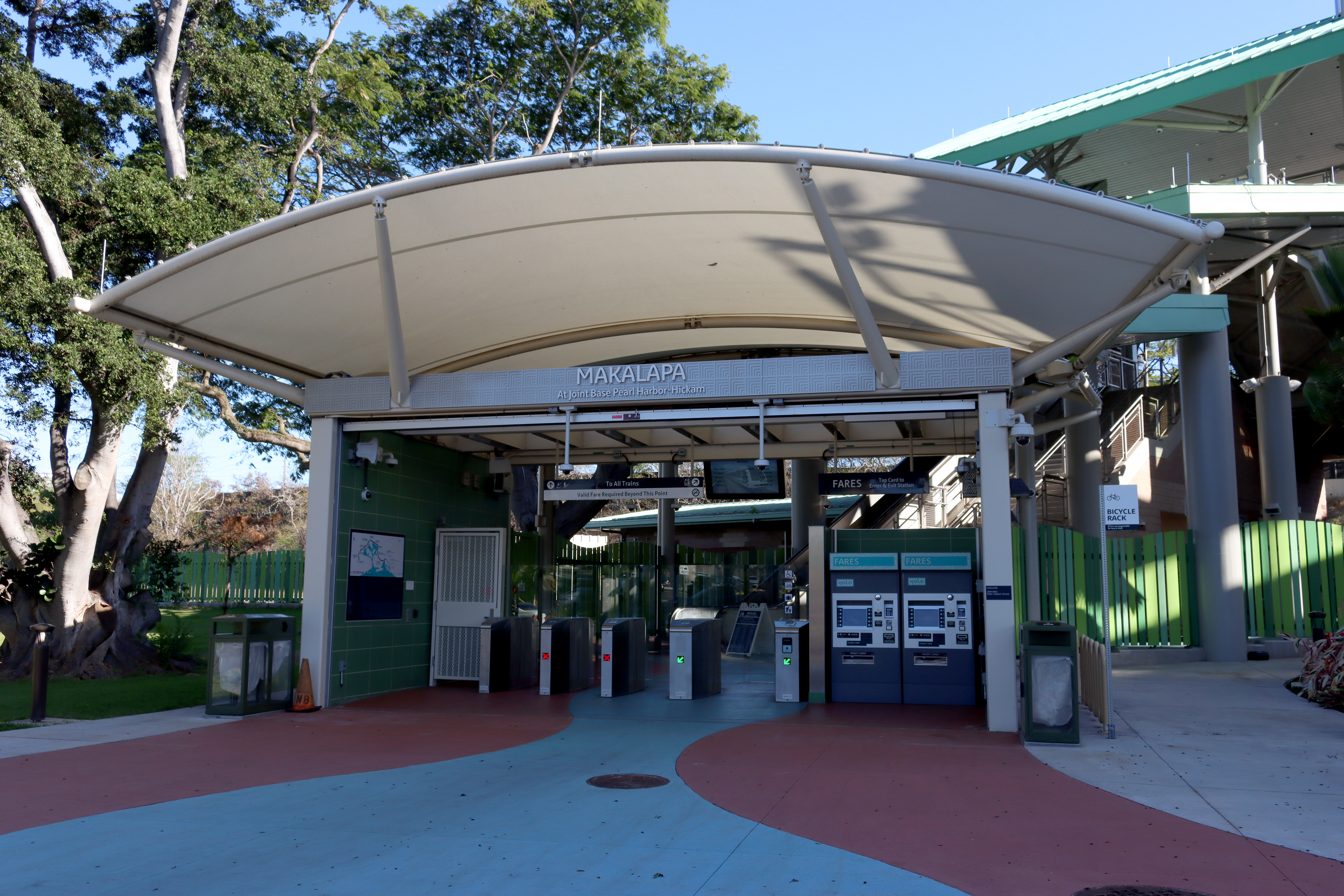
- Station entrance

General information
- Location: Kamehameha Highway & Radford Drive; Honolulu, Hawaiʻi
- Coordinates: 21°21′13″N 157°56′09″W
- Owner: Honolulu Department of Transportation Services
- Platforms: 2 side platforms
- Tracks: 2
- Connections: TheBus: 40, 42, 51, 331, PH8

Construction
- Structure type: Elevated
- Accessible: Yes

History
- Opened: October 16, 2025; 10 months ago

Services
Preceding station	Skyline	Following station
Hālawa toward Kualakaʻi	Skyline	Lelepaua toward Kahauiki
Location

Makalapa station (also known as Joint Base Pearl Harbor–Hickam station) is a Skyline station in Honolulu, Hawaiʻi, serving Joint Base Pearl Harbor–Hickam. It is part of Segment 2 of the Skyline route which opened on October 16, 2025.

The Hawaiian Station Name Working Group proposed Hawaiian names for the twelve rail stations on the eastern end of the rail system (stations in the Airport and City Center segments) in April 2019. The name of this station, Makalapa, means "ridge face" or "ridge front" and refers to the Makalapa crater above the Hālawa flats.
