= Āhua station =

Honolulu Skyline station

Āhua Lagoon Drive
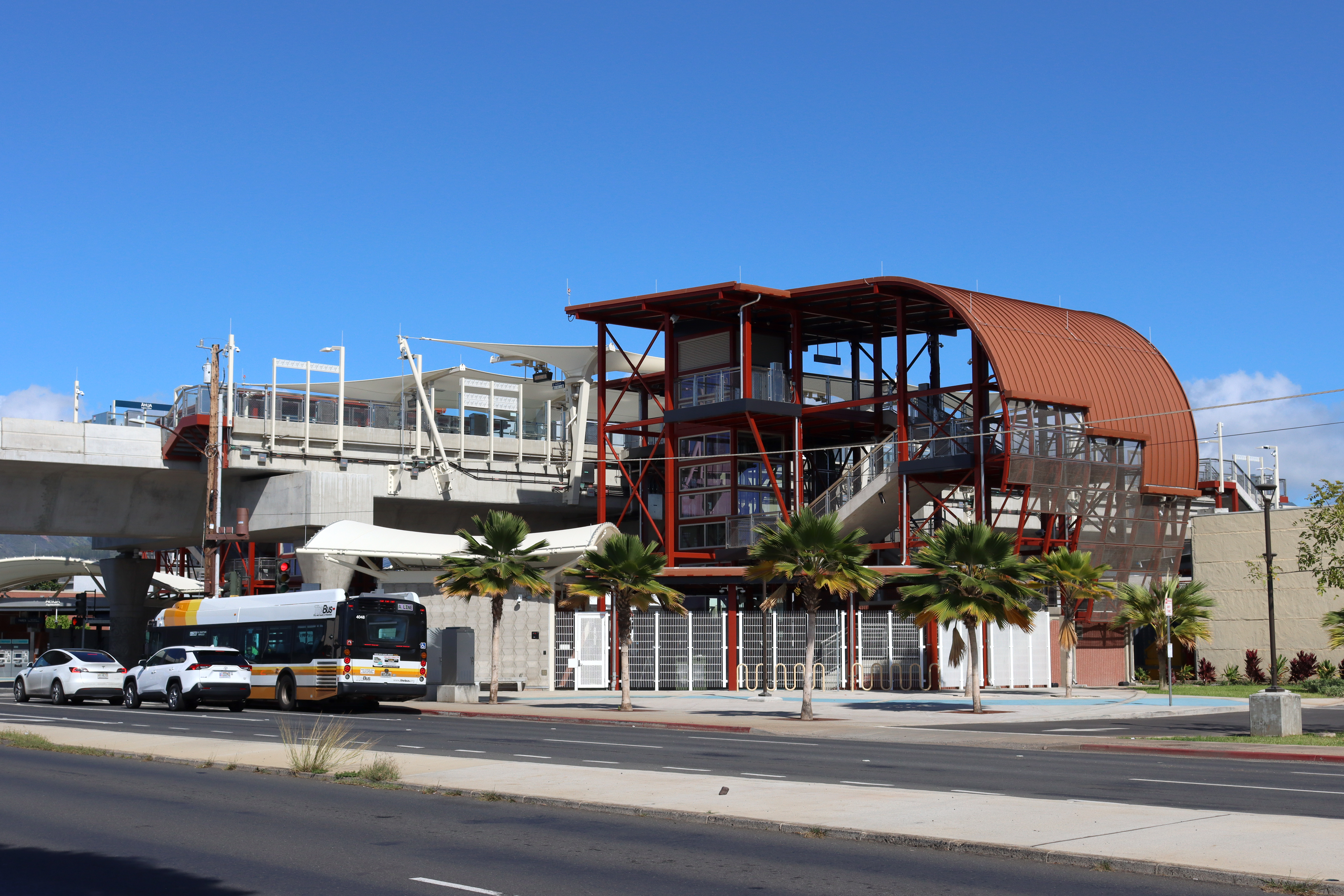
- Makai side of station building

General information
- Location: Lagoon Drive & Waiwai Loop; Honolulu, Hawaiʻi
- Coordinates: 21°19′59″N 157°54′09″W
- Owner: Honolulu Department of Transportation Services
- Platforms: 2 side platforms
- Tracks: 2
- Connections: TheBus: A, U, W, 40, 42, 51, 317

Construction
- Structure type: Elevated
- Accessible: Yes

History
- Opened: October 16, 2025; 10 months ago

Services
| Preceding station | Skyline | Following station |
|---|---|---|
| Lelepaua toward Kualakaʻi | Skyline | Kahauiki Terminus |
Location

Āhua station (also known as Lagoon Drive station) is a Skyline station in Honolulu, Hawaiʻi. It was built as part of Segment 2 of the Skyline route, which opened on October 16, 2025. The station is the primary transfer point between the Skyline and bus routes to Downtown Honolulu (A Line), UH Manoa (A and U lines), and Waikīkī (W Line).

The Hawaiian Station Name Working Group proposed Hawaiian names for the twelve rail stations on the eastern end of the rail system (stations in the Airport and City Center segments) in April 2019. The name of this station, Āhua, means "hillock" or "mound" and refers to an ancient reef that was dredged to create Keʻehi Lagoon.

== Gallery ==
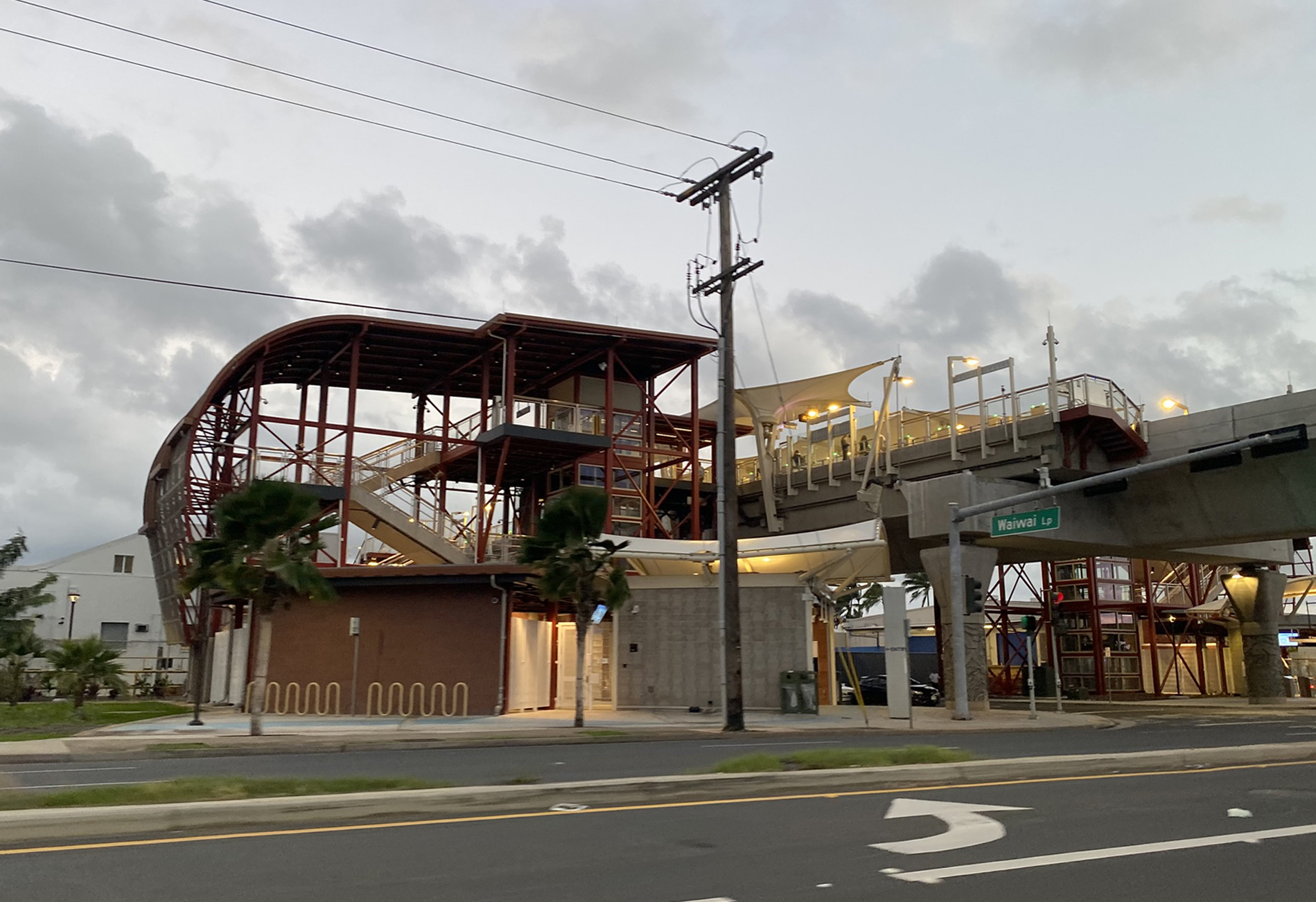
Skyline Ahua Station

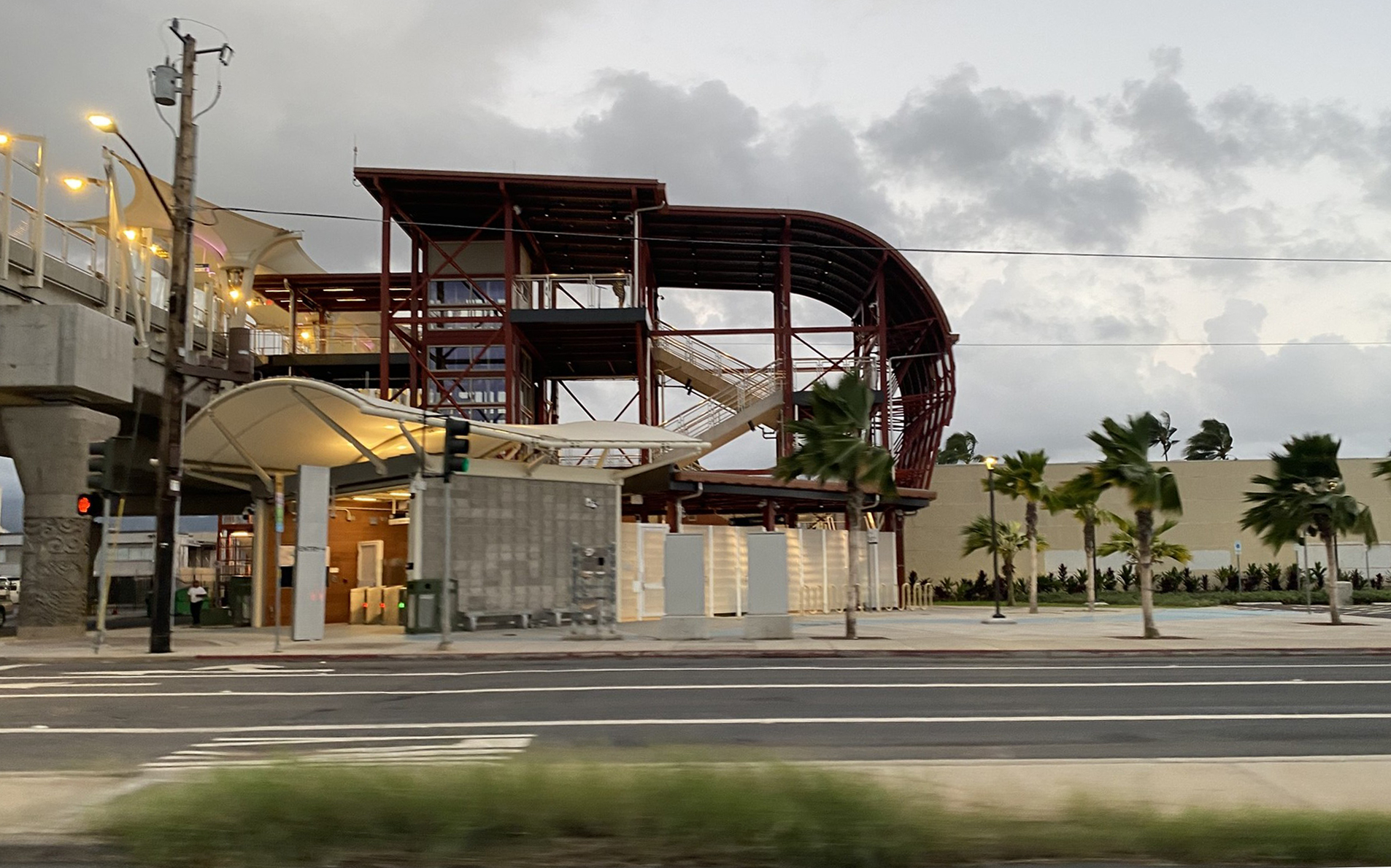
Skyline Ahua Station
