= Pearlridge Center =

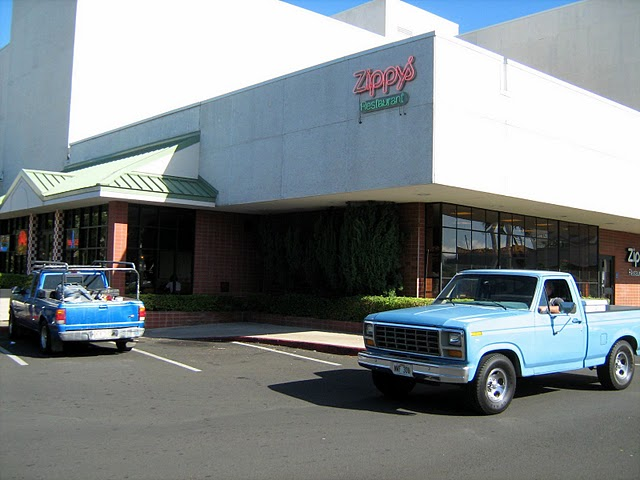
- Location: Aiea, Hawaii, United States
- Coordinates: 21.384588°N 157.941564°W
- Address: 98-1005 Moanalua Rd #231
- Opened: 1972
- Developer: Philip Lyon, Gordon & Company (E. Philip Lyon & Sheldon Gordon)
- Owner: Washington Prime Group
- Num. of stores: 170
- Num. of anchor tenants: 5
- Floor area: 1,288,600 square feet (119,710 m^{2})
- Floors: 2 (3 in Macy's and Sears)
- Website: pearlridgeonline.com

Pearlridge Center is the second largest shopping center in Hawaiʻi, after Ala Moana, and is Hawaiʻi's largest enclosed shopping center, located in ʻAiea. Opened in 1972 and expanded in 1976, the enclosed mall is split into three "phases" (Uptown, Downtown, and Phase Three) and overlooks historic Pearl Harbor and the USS Arizona Memorial. The property includes the only monorail in Hawaiʻi, the only emergency clinic located on mall property (Pali Momi Medical Center), and an eight-story office complex (Pearlridge Office Center). The mall is owned by Washington Prime Group, and is on land owned by Kamehameha Schools.

It is served by Kalauao (Pearlridge) station on the Honolulu Skyline.

== History ==
Pearlridge opened in 1972 with the Pearlridge Uptown. Pearlridge Uptown was anchored by JCPenney, Shirokiya, and Liberty House. In addition to this, Sears opened as a stand-alone store before Pearlridge Downtown opened. In 1976, Pearlridge Downtown opened and its Skycab as well. When Pearlridge Downtown opened, it was also anchored by Hawaii's first Daiei store and Fun Factory location.

In 1980 after Daiei purchased the Holiday Mart stores, they closed its Pearlridge store and relocated to the Holiday Mart Pearl City location. The movie theater would move from being near the Office Center and into the former Daiei space.

In 2004, after JCPenney shut down in Hawaii, the space formerly occupied by the anchor was converted into part of the mall. This would be initially anchored by Borders and Price Busters.

In 2018, Pearlridge Downtown was renovated which included the closure of Fun Factory, and the addition of shops like Uncles Grill. These would be completed in 2019.

In 2019, the shopping center announced the name change of its Uptown and Downtown sections. In an effort to include more Hawaiian culture in the center, the sections were renamed Wai Makai and Mauka. Additionally, the East and West sides of the mall were renamed Ko Makai and Awa Makai, respectively.

In 2021, Sears would be closed and as of 2024, it remains vacant to this day.

== Complex ==
Pearlridge consists of two major shopping areas: Pearlridge Mauka, formerly known as Uptown, and Pearlridge Wai Makai, formerly known as Downtown. There are also two minor strip malls, Pearlridge Ko Makai, formerly known as Pearlridge East and Pearlridge Awa Makai, formerly known as Pearlridge West. The two major shopping areas are connected by the only monorail system in Hawaiʻi. Pearlridge primary anchor tenants include: Macy's (formerly Liberty House) and, until 2021, Sears. There are over 170 stores and restaurants with two food courts, and a movie theater complex operated by Consolidated Theaters with sixteen screens.

=== Stand-alone stores ===
Not attached to any of the main Pearlridge buildings on either side (ʻEwa or Diamond Head sides) of Pali Momi Medical Center are several stand-alone stores: Anna Miller's, and Inspiration Pop Up. Ross Dress for Less moved into the space vacated by Borders Books & Music, which closed in 2011. The building formerly occupied by Inspiration Furniture is now occupied by Pali Momi Medical Center. Two thirds of GAP, also closed, and is now owned by Victoria's Secret. The other one third is currently unoccupied. As of 2024, this stub is now occupied by a Express store.

Originally, Pearlridge Awa Makai was anchored by a Star Markets supermarket, but was closed in 1994 to become a Circuit City. Circuit City operated in Pearlridge Awa Makai until it closed in 2009 due to bankruptcy. It was replaced by Bed Bath & Beyond in fall 2010. In 2023, the Bed Bath & Beyond closed following its bankruptcy. As of 2024, the former Bed Bath & Beyond remains vacant.

=== Stand-alone restaurants ===
Pearlridge hosts several stand-alone restaurants in the mall property. Pearlridge West hosts Anna Miller's and Bravo Restaurant. Near Uptown is Fuji Sushi and Teppanyaki, while Downtown hosts Chili's, California Pizza Kitchen, Pieology, Five Guys, and Big City Diner. The space once occupied by Sizzler was demolished to become a Bank of Hawaii location.

=== Pearlridge Office Center ===
The Pearlridge Office Center is an eight-story office complex mainly housing financial and professional suites located towards Pearlridge East.

=== Sumida Farm ===
A unique landmark of Pearlridge is Sumida Farm, Hawaiʻi's largest watercress farm, leased on land owned by Kamehameha Schools.

== Transportation ==
=== Skycab ===
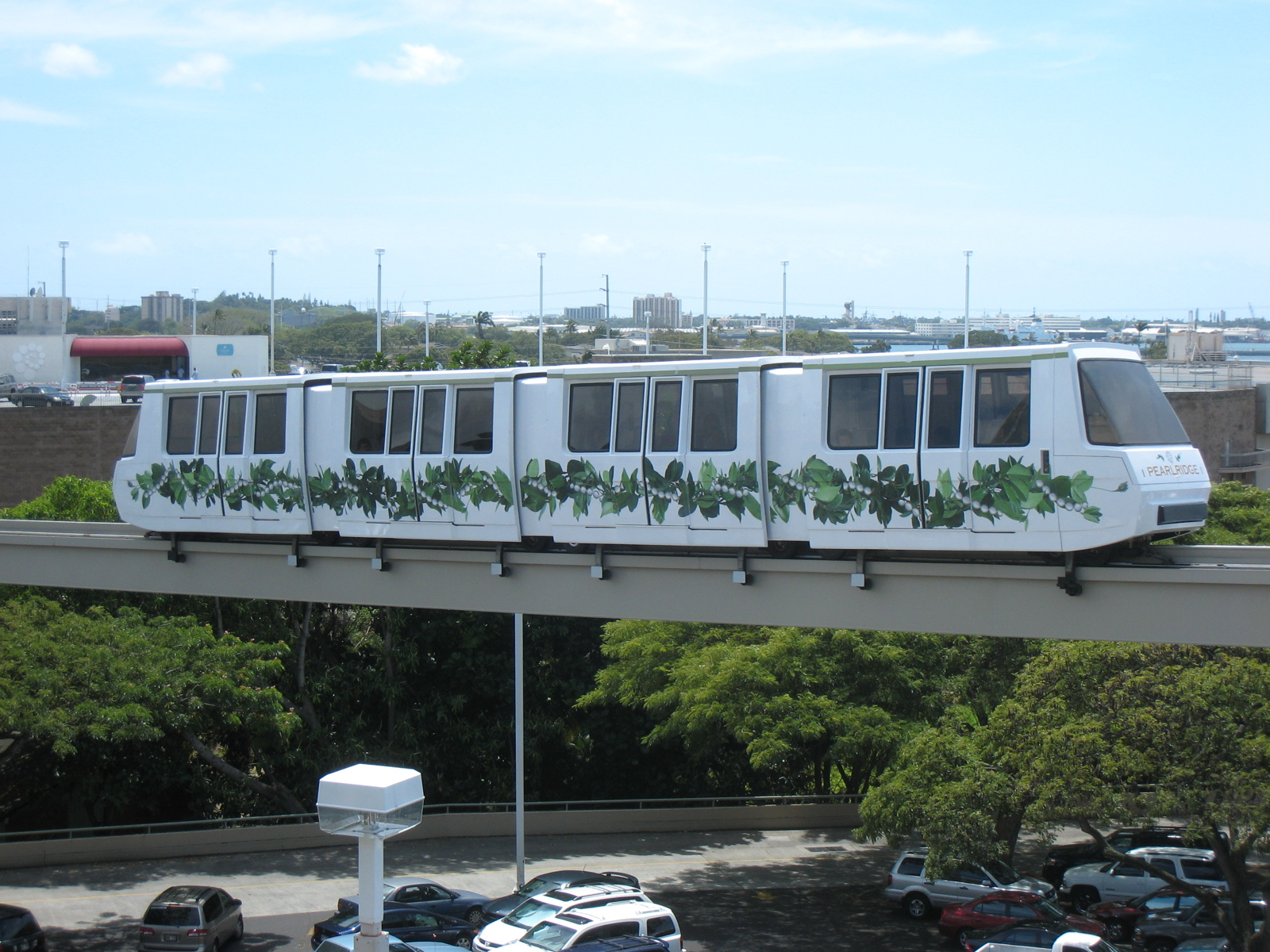
The Pearlridge Monorail in 2008

One of Pearlridge's most distinctive landmarks is the Skycab, Hawaiʻi's only monorail system. Connecting both Uptown and Downtown, it provides a unique transport and a notable focal point of the center. Rides cost $1.00 one way. The monorail first ran on November 7, 1977, and was built by Rohr Industries.

=== Skyline ===
Pearlridge is also served by Kalauao (Pearlridge) station on the Honolulu Skyline. After much delays, the Skyline opened to the public on June 30, 2023.
