= Anna Miller's =

Restaurant chain

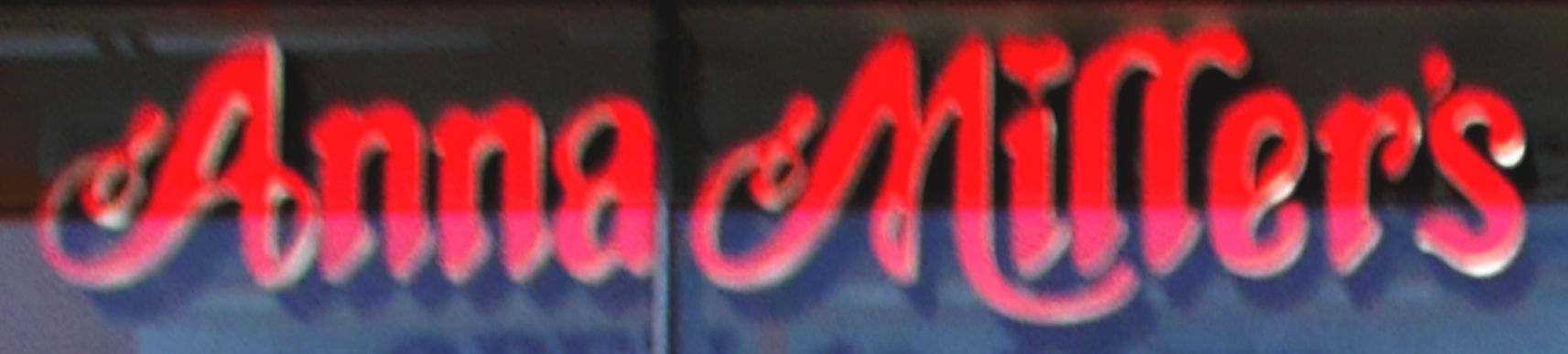
- Founded: Late 1960s
- Founder: Stanley Miller
- Headquarters: United States
- Areas served: ʻAiea, Hawaii, U.S. Tokyo, Japan
- Owner: Stanley Miller
- Website: annamillersrestaurant.com

A promotional image for Anna Miller's, featuring the trademark uniform

Anna Miller's (アンナミラーズ, Anna Mirāzu) is a chain of restaurants in Hawaii and Japan, and formerly, California.

== Beginnings ==
Founder and owner Stanley Miller named the restaurant after his grandmother. The Hawaii location opened in 1973, becoming the chain's seventh location after others were opened in California since the late 1960s. Also in 1973, the chain began a succession of 25 licensed locations in Japan. Hawaii manager Wade Hashizume began working at Anna Miller's as a baker in 1976. At its peak, a total of ten Anna Miller's restaurants were in operation. From August 2022 to February 2026, the Hawaii restaurant was the only one in operation, until another opened in Japan.

Anna Miller's ʻAiea, Hawaii location at Pearlridge Center.

== Japan ==
The chain has been known in Japan for its waitress uniforms. These consisted of a white blouse; an orange or pink miniskirted jumper-style dress, with the "waistline" cut beneath the breasts, in the manner of a bodice; a matching apron; and a heart-shaped name tag. In Japan, the outfit most likely helped to establish the phenomenon of the maid café.

In June 2022, operating company Imuraya announced that the last active Anna Miller's restaurant in Japan, located in Takanawa, would close on August 31, 2022. The restaurant, which opened in 1983, was the 11th of 25 restaurants in the chain. However, Anna Miller's maintained an online shop in Japan and briefly opened a pop-up shop at Tokyo's Koenji Station in late 2022, albeit without the iconic uniforms.

In June 2025, Japan Today reported that in December 2025, a branch would be opening in Tokyo’s Minami-Aoyama district. In November 2025, Anna Miller's Japanese website announced that its opening would be delayed until an anticipated date of February 2026, when it did in fact open.

== Cultural references ==
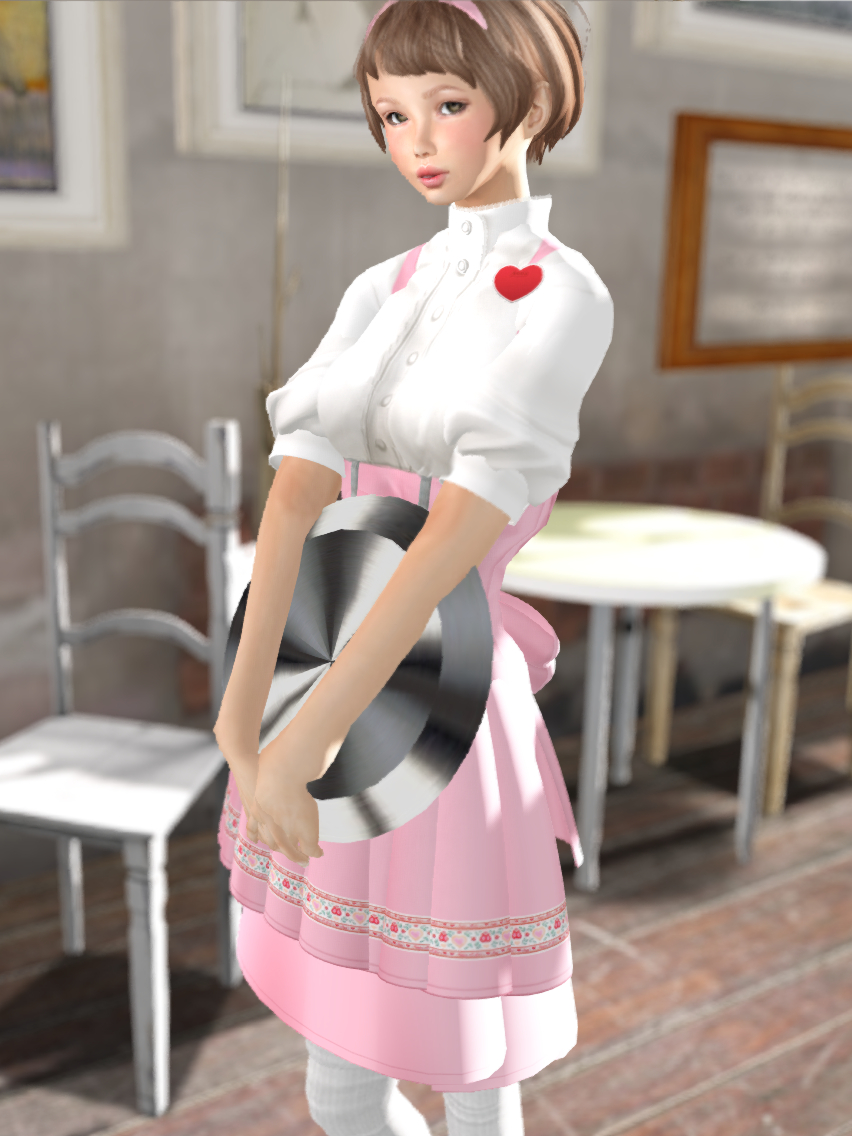
An avatar wearing an Anna Miller's uniform in Second Life

Anna Miller's "iconic waitress uniforms ... have appeared as homages and parodies in numerous anime, manga, and video game series" and inspired cosplay.

- Yuka Takeuchi, the main character from the video game series Variable Geo (and its anime spin-off) wears waitress uniform from Anna Miller's during battle, where the restaurant is called "Hanna Miller's".
- In the 1997 drama Risou no Kekkon, also known by its English title Wedding Story, the protagonist character Yamada Mari, played by Tokiwa Takako, is shown working as a waitress at Anna Miller's.
- In the anime series Excel Saga, the characters Excel and Hyatt work in a cafe wearing Anna Miller's waitress uniforms.
- In the anime series Oh My Goddess!, the character Urd works in the restaurant "Ana Miller's" later in the series, wearing the same uniform.
- In the Japanese visual novel Welcome to Pia Carrot, the action revolves around restaurants in the fictional "Pia Carrot" chain similar to Anna Miller's.
- In the popular web comic MegaTokyo, one of the main female characters, Nanasawa Kimiko, works as a waitress at an Anna Millers in Tokyo.
- Akira Uehara, main character from Your and My Secret (Boku to Kanojo no XXX) works at Anna Miller's restaurant.
- In Clock Tower one of the lead characters, Jennifer Simpson, has an unlockable Anna Miller's-like waitress uniform.

== See also ==
- List of restaurants in Hawaii
- List of restaurants in Tokyo
