= List of TheBus routes =

List of Bus Routes for TheBus in Oahu, Hawaii

List of bus routes for TheBus in Honolulu.

Bus route and services subject to change according to traffic, detours, and extreme bus delays. If service was not as described, check with TheBus website or consult TheBus customer service to confirm changes before editing.

TheBus made route changes that took place in 2012. A new numbering system is taking effect that will see several routes renumbered based on the area the routes services and to utilize them as part of the under construction HART light rail project that is expected to be finished in 2024, depending on the completion. On March 4, 2018, preparation for the new numbering system took effect, which changed one bus route number based on the area the route services. On March 3, 2019, the first phase took effect. A second phase went into effect June 3, 2019. A third phase went into effect August 18, 2019.

== Express routes ==
=== Express service ===
Route	Description	Frequency
A Line	Travels limited-stop between Āhua/Lagoon Drive station and UH Mānoa via Downtown Honolulu and Ala Moana Center.	10 min. weekdays, 20 min. weekends
CountryExpress! C	Travels limited-stop between Mākaha and Ala Moana Center via Alapaʻi Transit Center, Waiʻanae, Lualualei, Māʻili, Nānākuli, Kapolei, Kualakaʻi/East Kapolei station, Keoneʻae/UH West Oahu station, Kalihi, Chinatown, Downtown Honolulu and Kakaʻako. Serves Waiʻanae Transit Center, Kapolei, Alapaʻi Transit Center, and Kalihi Transit Center.	30 min. daily
CountryExpress! E	Travels limited-stop between ʻEwa Beach and Waikīkī via ʻEwa, Waipahu, and Downtown. Serves ʻEwa Beach Transit Center, Pouhala/Waipahu Transit Center station, King/Punchbowl, Ala Moana Center, and Kapiʻolani Park.	30 min. weekdays, 60 min. weekends
U Line	Travels non-stop between Āhua/Lagoon Drive station and UH Mānoa. Interlines with Route 317 on select trips.	60 min. weekdays only
W Line	Travels limited-stop between Daniel K. Inouye International Airport and Waikīkī via Āhua/Lagoon Drive station, Downtown Honolulu, Ala Moana Center and Honolulu Zoo.	10 min. weekdays, 15 min. weekends

=== Limited stop service ===
Route	Name	Description	Notes
1L	Halawa – Hawaiʻi Kai Limited	Travels between Hālawa/Aloha Stadium station and Hawaiʻi Kai via Salt Lake, Chinatown, Downtown Honolulu, McCully-Mōʻiliʻili, Kaimukī, Kahala Mall, and ʻĀina Haina.	Service operates every 30 minutes daily 5AM-7PM.
2L	Kalihi – Waikiki – Kahala Limited	Travels between Kalihi and Hawaiʻi Kai via Chinatown, Downtown Honolulu, Waikīkī, Kapahulu, Kaimukī, Kapiʻolani Community College, Diamond Head, and Kahala Mall	Operates 6AM-6PM weekdays.

== Standard routes ==
Route	Name	Description	Areas of Interest	Mon-Fri	Sat	Sun/Hol
1	Kalihi – Kaimukī – Kahala/Hawaiʻi Kai	Travels between Kalihi and Kahala; continues through ʻĀina Haina to Hawaiʻi Kai when route 1L is not running.	Chinatown, Downtown Honolulu, Hawaiʻi State Capitol, Hawaiʻi State Library, ʻIolani Palace, Neal Blaisdell Center, McCully-Mōʻiliʻili, Kaimukī, Kāhala Mall, ʻĀina Haina, Hawai'i Kai	4AM‑1:15AM	4AM‑1:15AM	5AM‑1:15AM
2	School St – Waikīkī – Kahala	Travels between Kalihi Transit Center and Kahala Mall.	Kalihi, Kamehameha Shopping Center, Chinatown, Downtown Honolulu, Hawaiʻi State Capitol, Hawaiʻi State Library, ʻIolani Palace, Neal Blaisdell Center, Hawaiʻi Convention Center, Waikīkī Beach and Hotels, Honolulu Zoo, Kaimukī, Kapiʻolani Community College, Diamond Head, and Kahala Mall. (Kahala Mall extension effective on 08/20/2023)	24 hours	24 hours	24 hours
3	Salt Lake – Kaimukī	Travels between Salt Lake and Kapiʻolani Community College.	Salt Lake Shopping Center, Alapaʻi Transit Center, Chinatown, Downtown Honolulu, Ala Moana Center, Hawaiʻi Convention Center, Kapahulu, Kaimukī, and Kapiʻolani Community College	4AM‑1:30AM	5AM‑1:30AM	5AM‑1:30AM
4	Nuʻuanu – University – McCully	Travels between Liliha (via Nuʻuanu Avenue) and Mōʻiliʻili to Waikīkī (at McCully and Kalākaua Avenue intersection prior to returning to McCully Street).	St. Francis Medical Center, Queen's Medical Center, Alapaʻi Transit Center, Chinatown, Downtown Honolulu, Makiki, University of Hawaiʻi at Mānoa, McCully-Mōʻiliʻili, and Waikīkī	5AM‑1AM	5AM‑1AM	5AM‑1AM
5	Ala Moana – Mānoa	Travels between Ala Moana Center and Mānoa Valley.	Kapiʻolani Medical Center for Women and Children, Shriner's Children Hawaiʻi, Walmart, Sam's Club, and Ala Moana Center	5AM–10PM	6AM–10PM	6AM–10PM
6	Pauoa – University – Woodlawn	Travels between Pauoa Valley and Mānoa Valley.	Downtown Honolulu, Ward Center, Kaka’ako, Ala Moana Center, McCully-Mōʻiliʻili, University of Hawaiʻi at Mānoa, and Mānoa Marketplace	4:30AM‑12:30AM	5AM‑12:30AM	5AM‑12AM
7	Kalihi Valley – Kahala	Travels between Kalihi Valley and Kahala Mall (Formerly part of Route 9)	Kalihi Valley, Kamehameha Shopping Center, Bishop Museum, Kalihi-Palama Library, Nimitz Center, Chinatown, Downtown Honolulu, Kakaako, Ala Moana Center, McCully-Mōʻiliʻili, Kaimukī, and Kahala Mall.	5AM–11PM	5AM–11PM	5AM–11:30PM
8	Makiki – Ala Moana – Waikiki	Travels between Waikīkī and Makiki (utilizing Pi'ikoi and Pensacola Streets) via Ala Moana Center.	Makiki, Kaiser Permanente Honolulu, Ala Moana Center, Hawaiʻi Convention Center, Waikīkī Beach and Hotels, Honolulu Zoo, and Kapiʻolani Park	7AM–11PM	8AM–10AM	8AM–10PM
10	Kalihi – Kapālama – 'Ālewa	Travels between Kalihi Kai and 'Ālewa Heights. Select school trips to service Nuʻuanu.	Kalihi Kai, Natsunoya Tea House, 'Ālewa Heights, Liliha, St. Francis Medical Center	5AM–10:45PM	5:45AM–10:15PM	5:45AM–10:15PM
13	Liliha – Waikīkī – University	Travels between Liliha Street and UH Mānoa via Downtown Honolulu, Waikiki and Kapahulu.	Liliha, St. Francis Medical Center, Chinatown, Downtown Honolulu, Hawaiʻi State Capitol, Hawaiʻi State Library, ʻIolani Palace, Ala Moana Center, Hawaiʻi Convention Center, Waikīkī Beach and Hotels, Honolulu Zoo, Kapahulu, Market City Shopping Center, and University of Hawaiʻi at Mānoa	4AM‑1AM	4AM‑1AM	5AM‑1AM
14	Saint Louis Heights – Kapahulu – Maunalani Heights	Travels between St. Louis Heights and Maunalani Heights. (Three morning and night routes shortcut onto Waiʻalae Ave instead)	Waʻahila State Recreation Area, Saint Louis Heights, Market City Shopping Center, Kapahulu, Waikiki Beach, Kaimana Beach, Kapiʻolani Park, Diamond Head Beach Park, Waiʻalae Beach Park, Waiʻalae Country Club, Kāhala Mall, Kaimukī, Wilhemina Rise, Mau'umae Nature Park, and Maunalani Heights	5AM–10PM	6AM–10PM	7AM–10PM
23	Kahala – Hawaiʻi Kai – Sea Life Park	Travels between Kahala Mall and Sea Life Park via Kalanianaʻole Highway. Interlines with Route 69 on most trips.	Kahala Mall, ʻĀina Haina, Hawaiʻi Kai, Kalama Valley, Sea Life Park	5AM-8:30PM	5AM-8:30PM	6AM-8:30PM
32	Pearlridge – Foster Village – Kalihi	Travels between Pearlridge and Kalihi Transit Center via Foster Village and Salt Lake.	Fort Shafter, Salt Lake, Salt Lake Shopping Center, Foster Village, Stadium Mall, Hālawa/Aloha Stadium station, and Pearlridge Center.	5AM–10PM	6AM–10PM	6:30AM–10PM
40	Mākaha – Honolulu	Travels between Mākaha Valley Towers to Honolulu. Select trips service Makaha Beach. Select trips end at Kapolei Transit Center, Waipahu Transit Center or Pearl City.	Ala Moana Center, Neal S. Blaisdell Center, Alapaʻi Transit Center, Queen's Medical Center, Downtown Honolulu, Hawaiʻi State Capitol, Hawaiʻi State Library, ʻIolani Palace, Chinatown, Honolulu Community College, City Square Shopping Center, Kalihi, OCCC, Keʻehi Lagoon, Pearl Harbor, Pearlridge Center, Pearl City Shopping Center, Waipahu, Tanioka's, Pouhala/Waipahu Transit Center station Waikele, West Loch, UH West O’ahu, Kapolei, Kapolei Golf Club, Kapolei Shopping Center, Ko ʻOlina, Nānākuli, Ulehawa Beach Park, Māʻili, Māʻili Beach Park, Waiʻanae, Waiʻanae Transit Center, Waiʻanae Mall, Pōkaʻī Bay Beach Park, Mākaha Valley	24 hours	24 hours	24 hours
41	Kapolei – Ewa Beach	Travels between Kapolei Transit Center and Ewa Beach Transit Center via Kalaeloa.	Ewa Gentry, Kapolei Shopping Center, Ka Makana Aliʻi Center, Kapolei Parkway	5AM–11PM	5:30AM–11PM	5:30AM–11PM
42	Ewa Beach – Waikiki	Travels between ʻEwa Beach and Waikīkī via Fort Weaver Road, Farrington Highway and Kamehameha Highway. Interlines with routes E and 91 on select trips.	ʻEwa Beach, Waipahu, Pearl City, ʻAiea, Kalihi, Chinatown, Downtown Honolulu, Waikīkī, Arizona Memorial/Pearl Harbor (during operating hours), Pearlridge, Hālawa/Aloha Stadium station, Daniel K. Inouye International Airport (Nimitz Highway), Dillingham, Ala Moana Center, Waikīkī, Honolulu Zoo, Kapiʻolani Park	4AM‑3AM	4AM‑3AM	4AM‑3AM
43	Waipahu – Waiawa	Travels between the Hōʻaeʻae/West Loch station and Waiawa Road via East and West Waipahu.	Hōʻaeʻae/West Loch station, West Waipahu, Filipino Community Center, Pouhala/Waipahu Transit Center station, East Waipahu, Waiawa Road	4AM‑2AM	5AM‑1:30AM	5AM‑1:30AM (holidays)
44	UH West Oahu – Ewa Villages – West Loch	Travels between the Keoneʻae/UH West Oahu station and Hōʻaeʻae/West Loch station via ʻEwa Villages.	Keoneʻae/UH West Oahu station, Kualakaʻi/East Kapolei station, Ka Makana Ali'i, ʻEwa Gentry, and Hōʻaeʻae/West Loch station	4:30AM–12:45AM	5AM–12:45AM	5AM–12:30AM
46	Kapolei Commons – UH West Oahu	Service to Keoneʻae/UH West Oahu station from Kapolei Commons.	Travels between Kapolei Commons and Keoneʻae/UH West Oahu station via Kapolei Transit Center, Villages of Kapolei, and Kā Makana Ali'i Center.	4AM–7PM	7AM–7PM	7AM–7PM
47	UH West Oahu – Ewa Beach	Service to Keoneʻae/UH West Oahu station from Ewa Beach.	Travels between Ewa Beach and Keoneʻae/UH West Oahu station via Ewa Gentry, Kā Makana Ali'i Center, and Kualakaʻi/East Kapolei station.	4AM–11PM	4AM–11PM	4AM–11PM
51	Wahiawā – Honolulu	Travels between Wahiawā Heights via Kamehameha Highway to Downtown Honolulu. Services Ala Moana Center on select trips.	Wahiawā, Mililani, Waipi'o Gentry, Pearl City, Pearlridge Shopping Center, Hālawa/Aloha Stadium station, Pearl Harbor (Makalapa), Daniel K. Inouye International Airport, Kalihi, Chinatown, Downtown Honolulu, Alapaʻi Transit Center. Interlines with Route 52 on select trips.	4AM‑1AM	5AM‑1AM	5AM‑1AM
52	Haleiwa – Wahiawa – Honolulu	Travels between Haleʻiwa and Ala Moana Center via Dillingham Boulevard and Downtown Honolulu. Between Mililani and Kalihi the service is non-stop via H-1 and H-2 Freeways. Select trips end at Alapaʻi Transit Center. Interlines with routes 51 and 60 on select trips.	Haleʻiwa, Dole Plantation, Wahiawā, Mililani, Kalihi, Chinatown, Downtown Honolulu, Ala Moana Center	4:30AM‑1AM	5AM‑12AM	5AM‑11PM
53	Pacific Palisades – Honolulu	Travels between Pacific Palisades and Ala Moana Center. Between Pearlridge and Vineyard Boulevard the service is near non-stop via H-201 and H-1 Freeways excluding Red Hill.	Pearl City, Pearlridge Shopping Center, Red Hill, Downtown Honolulu, Ala Moana Center. Alapaʻi Transit Center (westbound only)	4:30AM‑11:30PM	—N/a	—N/a
54	Pearl City – Honolulu (Upper/Lower)	Travels between Pearl City and Downtown Honolulu. Select trips will end at Hālawa (Eastbound.)	Waiau, Pearlridge Shopping Center, ʻAiea, Hālawa, Red Hill, Chinatown, Downtown Honolulu, Alapaʻi Transit Center.	5AM‑11PM	5AM‑11PM	6AM‑10:30PM
60	Haleiwa – Kaneohe – Honolulu	Travels between Haleʻiwa and Ala Moana Center via Likelike Highway to Kāneʻohe and Kamehameha Highway to North Shore/Hale'iwa. Interlines with Route 52 on select trips.	North Shore, Waimea Bay, Turtle Bay Resort, Kahuku, Lāʻie, Polynesian Cultural Center, Hauʻula, Punaluʻu, Kahana, Kaʻaʻawa, Waiāhole, Kahaluʻu, Heʻeia State Park, Windward Mall, Kamehameha Shopping Center, Downtown Honolulu, Kakaʻako, Ala Moana Center	3:45AM‑2AM	4:30AM‑2AM	4:30AM‑2AM
61	Kalihi – Kaneohe – Aikahi	Travels between Kalihi Transit Center and Aikahi Park Shopping Center via Kalihi Street and Likelike Highway. Interlines with Route 66 (to continue to Kailua Town and Downtown Honolulu.)	Kalihi, Kalihi Valley, Windward City Shopping Center, Windward Community College, Windward Mall, Aikahi Park Shopping Center	4:30AM–10:40PM	4:45AM–10:30AM	5AM–10:25PM
65	Ahuimanu – Kaneohe – Honolulu	Travels between Ahuimanu and Ala Moana Center via Pali Highway.	Ala Moana Center, Kakaʻako, Downtown Honolulu, Nuʻuanu, Kāneʻohe, Windward Mall, Koʻolau Center, ʻĀhuimanu	5AM‑11PM	5AM‑10PM	5AM‑10PM
66	Downtown – Kailua – Aikahi	Travels between Downtown Honolulu, Kailua, and Aikahi Park Shopping Center. Interlines with Route 61.	Downtown Honolulu, Nuʻuanu, Castle Medical Center, Kailua Town, Aikahi Park Shopping Center	4:30AM‑10:40PM	4:45AM‑10:30AM	5AM‑10:25PM
67	Waimanalo – Kailua – Honolulu	Travels between Ala Moana Center, Downtown Honolulu, Kailua, and Waimānalo.	Downtown Honolulu, Nuʻuanu, Kailua Town, Castle Medical Center, Ala Moana Center	5AM‑10:30PM	5AM‑10:30PM	5AM‑10:30PM
69	Kāneʻohe – Waimānalo – Sea Life Park	Travels between Kāneʻohe, Waimānalo, and Sea Life Park via Kamehameha and Kalanianaʻole Highways. Interlines with Route 23 on select trips.	Kāneʻohe, Waimānalo Beach Park, Windward Mall, Windward City Shopping Center, Castle Medical Center, Sea Life Park	5:30AM-10PM	5:30AM-10PM	5:30AM-10PM
102	Makiki – Ala Moana	Travels between Makiki and Ala Moana Center utilizing Ke'eaumoku Street.	Makiki	5AM–10PM	6AM–10PM	6AM–10PM
122	Punchbowl – Alapaʻi	Shuttle service operating within Downtown, Government buildings, and The Queens Medical Center	Downtown Honolulu, Honolulu and Hawaii State Government facilities, The Queens Medical Center and adjacent clinics, Alapaʻi Transit Center	5AM‑9PM	5AM‑9PM	5AM‑9PM
123	Pacific Heights – Papakolea – Alapaʻi	Travels between Pacific Heights and Alapaʻi Transit Center via Papakolea. Select trips will utilize Auwaiolimu Street and terminate at Papakolea.	Alapaʻi Transit Center, Pacific Heights, Makiki, Papakolea, National Memorial Cemetery of the Pacific, Neil S. Blaisdell Center.	6AM‑9PM	6AM‑8PM	7AM‑8PM
151	Chinatown – Kuakini – Kauluwela	Travels between Halewaiolu Senior Residences and Kuakini Street via Chinatown and Downtown.	Halewaiolu Senior Housing, Downtown Honolulu, Chinatown, Liliha Street, and Kuakini Street.	5AM–8PM	5:30AM–8PM	5:30AM–8PM
200	Kapiolani Park – Palolo Valley	Travels between Pālolo Valley and Kapiʻolani Park. Formerly Route 9s.	Palolo Valley District Park, Market City Shopping Center, Kaimuki, Kapiʻolani Community College, Monsarrat Avenue, Honolulu Zoo, and Waikiki Beach.	5AM–10:30PM	5AM–10:30PM	5AM–10:30PM
234	Kahala – Waialae Nui	Travels between Kāhala Mall and Waiʻalae Nui.	Waiʻalae Nui	6–7:30AM/2:48–6PM	—N/a	—N/a
301	Tripler – Kalihi	Travels between Tripler Army Medical Center and Kalihi Transit Center.	Tripler Army Medical Center, Kalihi Transit Center.	4:30AM–7PM	5AM–7PM	6AM–7PM
302	Moanalua Valley – Kalihi	Travels between Moanalua Valley and Kalihi Transit Center via Red Hill.	Moanalua Valley, Red Hill, Kaiser Permanente Moanalua Medical Center.	5:45–7:30AM/2–6PM	—N/a	—N/a
306	Kalihi Kai Circulator	Travels between Kalihi Transit Center and Kahauiki Village via Nimitz Hwy. U-Turn at Ahua St.	Kalihi Transit Center – Kahauiki Village – Sand Island – Kalihi – School – Middle	5-7AM/4-6PM	5-7AM/4-6PM	5-7AM/4-6PM
307	Kalihi – Kamehameha IV Road	Travels between Kalihi Transit Center and Kalihi Valley Homes.	Kalihi Transit Center, Mokauea Street, Gulick Avenue, Kamehameha IV Housings. Formerly part of Route 7.	5:30AM–11PM	5:30AM–11PM	5:30AM–11PM
317	Ahua-Lagoon	Operates to/from Āhua/Lagoon Drive station along Lagoon Drive. Interlines with U Line.	Āhua/Lagoon Drive station	5:15–7:15AM / 4–5:20PM	—N/a	—N/a
331	Hickam – Makalapa station	Travels between Makalapa station and Hickam Air Force Base	Joint Base Pearl Harbor–Hickam	4AM–8PM	4AM–8PM	5AM–8PM
401	Waiʻanae Valley	Travels between Waiʻanae Transit Center and Waiʻanae Valley. Interlines with Route 402 and 403.	Waiʻanae Valley	3:30AM–9PM	3:30AM–9PM	3:30AM–9PM
402	Waianae – Lualualei	Travels between Waiʻanae Transit Center and Lualualei Homestead. Interlines with Route 401 and 403.	Lualualei	4AM–10PM	4AM–10PM	4AM–10PM
403	Waiʻanae – Maili – Nanakuli	Travels between Waiʻanae Transit Center and Nānākuli via Māʻili. Interlines with Route 401 and 402.	Nānākuli	4AM–10:30PM	4AM–10:30PM	4AM–10:30PM
411	Makakilo Heights – Kapolei	Travels between Makakilo Heights and Kapolei Transit Center via Palailai. Interlines with Route 416.	Makakilo Heights, Kapolei Shopping Center	4:30AM–1AM	5AM–1AM	5AM–1AM
413	Campbell Industrial Park – Kapolei	Travels between Campbell Industrial Park and Kapolei Transit Center via Kalaeloa Boulevard. Interlines with Route 415 on select trips.	Campbell Industrial Park, Kapolei Shopping Center, Kalaeloa Ferry Terminal	5AM-8PM	5AM-8PM	5AM-8PM
414	Palahia – Makakilo – Kapolei	Service from Kapolei to Palahia via Panana Street.	Travels between Makakilo Heights and Kapolei Transit Center via Panana and Palahia Street	5AM–9PM	5AM–9PM	5AM–9PM
415	Kapolei – Kalaeloa	Travels between Kapolei Transit Center and Kalaeloa-Barbers Point. Interlines with routes 41 or 413 on select trips.	Kalaeloa, Kapolei Shopping Center, U.S. Vets Initiative, Hawaiʻi National Guard, FBI Honolulu Field Office, Barbers Point Housing, Villages of Kapolei.	5AM-7PM	5AM-9PM	5AM-9PM
416	Kapolei Circulator	Service to Central and East Kapolei from Kapolei Transit Center. Interlines with Route 411.	Travels between Kapolei Transit Center and Keoneʻae/UH West Oahu station via Kapolei Homesteads, Kā Makana Ali'i Center, Kroc Center Hawaii, Kualakaʻi/East Kapolei station, and Ho'opili Neighborhoods.	5AM–7PM	5AM–7PM	5AM–7PM
421	Kapilina	One trip between Kapilina and Ewa Beach Transit Center.	Pouhala/Waipahu Transit Center station, Filipino Community Center, Waikele Premium Outlets, Waipiʻo Shopping Center	6:40AM & 4:40PM	—N/a	—N/a
433	Waipahu-Waikele-Waipi'o	Travels between Waipahu Transit Center to Waikele Shopping Center. Does not service Waipi'o on Sundays.	Pouhala/Waipahu Transit Center station, Filipino Community Center, Waikele Premium Outlets, Waipiʻo Shopping Center	4AM–12:30AM	5AM–12:30AM	5:30AM–12AM
444	Royal Kunia – Village Park – Hoaeae	Travels between Royal Kunia to Hōʻaeʻae/West Loch station via Village Park. Formerly Route 434	Hōʻaeʻae/West Loch station, Village Park, Royal Kunia Park and Ride	4:00AM–12:00AM	4:00AM–12AM	4:00AM–12AM
461	Palahia – Makakilo – UH West Oahu	Service to Keoneʻae/UH West Oahu station from Makakilo Heights.	Travels between Makakilo Heights and Keoneʻae/UH West Oahu station via Farrington Hwy.	4AM–7PM	7AM–7PM	7AM–7PM

== Community Access routes ==
Route	Name	Description	Areas of Interest	Mon-Fri	Sat	Sun/Hol
501	Mililani Town – Mililani Mauka	Travels community access service between Mililani Mauka and Mililani Transit Center. Serves Mililani Transit Center, Mililani Town Center, and Mililani Park & Ride.				
503	Launani Valley – Mililani Town	Travels community access service between Launani Valley and Mililani Transit Center via Waipiʻo Acres. Serves Mililani Transit Center, Mililani Shopping Center, and Mililani Town Center.				
504	South Mililani – Mililani Town	Travels community access service between Mililani South and Mililani Transit Center. Serves Mililani Transit Center and Mililani Town Center.				
511	Schofield-Wahiawā	Travels between Schofield and Wahiawā Transit Center. Interlines with Route 51 on select trips; formerly part of Route 72.	Wahiawā, Schofield Barracks	5:30AM–9PM (extended to midnight on Fridays only)	7AM–12AM	8AM–12AM
512	Wahiawā-Whitmore	Travels between Whitmore Village and Wahiawā Transit Center. Interlines with Route 52 on select trips; formerly part of Route 72.	Wahiawā, Whitmore Village	5:30AM–9PM (extended to midnight on Fridays only)	7AM–12AM	8AM–12AM
521	Waialua – Haleʻiwa	Travels between Waialua and Haleʻiwa. Renumbered from Route 76.	Waialua, Haleʻiwa, Historic Haleʻiwa Town business area	6AM–7PM	6AM–7PM	7AM–7PM
531	Pearl Highlands – Manana	Travels between Waiawa/Pearl Highlands station and West Pearl City – Manana. Renumbered from Route 73.	Waiawa/Pearl Highlands station, Lower Pearl City, and Pearl City Manana	4AM–7PM	7AM–7PM	7AM–7PM
532	Pearl Highland – Momilani	Travels between Waiawa/Pearl Highlands station and East Pearl City – Momilani. Renumbered from Route 73.	Waiawa/Pearl Highlands station, Upper Pearl City, and Pearl City Momilani	7AM–7PM	7AM–7PM	7AM–7PM
533	Pearl Highlands – Pacific Palisades	Travels between Pearl Highlands Waiawa Station and Pacific Palisades via Pearl City Bus Facility. Renumbered from Route 53 (weekend shuttle).	Waiawa/Pearl Highlands station, Pearl City Bus Facility, and Pacific Palisades	—N/a	5AM–11PM	5AM–11PM
535	Pearl Highlands – Pearl City Peninsula	Travels between Waiawa/Pearl Highlands station and Pearl City Peninsula. Renumbered from Route 73.	Waiawa/Pearl Highlands stationv and Pearl City Peninsula	4AM–7PM	7AM–7PM	7AM–7PM
541	Wailuna – Pearlridge	Travels between Wailuna Community and Kalauao/Pearlridge station via Kaahumanu Street.	Wailuna Community, Kaahumanu Street, and Kalauao/Pearlridge station. Interlines with Route 545	4AM–8PM	7AM–8PM	7AM–8PM
542	Newtown – Royal Summit – Pearlridge	Travels between Newtown and Kalauao/Pearlridge station via Royal Summit. Renumbered from Route 71.	Newtown, Royal Summit, and Kalauao/Pearlridge station. Interlines with Route 544	4AM–8PM	7AM–8PM	7AM–8PM
544	Pearlridge – Pearlridge Heights	Travels between Upper Pearlridge and Kalauao/Pearlridge station via Kaonohi Street. Renumbered from Route 71.	Upper Pearlridge, Kaonohi Street, Kalauao/Pearlridge station. Interlines with Route 542	4AM–7PM	7AM–7PM	7AM–7PM
545	Pearlridge – Pali Momi – Koauka	Travels between Koauka Street and Kalauao/Pearlridge station via Pali Momi Medical Center.	Koauka Street, Pali Momi Medical Center, Kalauao/Pearlridge station. Interlines with Route 541	4AM–7PM	7AM–7PM	7AM–7PM
551	Aiea Heights – Aloha Stadium	Travels between Aiea Heights and Hālawa/Aloha Stadium station via Kaamilo Street. Renumbered from Route 74	Aiea Heights, Kaamilo Street, Hālawa/Aloha Stadium station. Interlines with Route 552	4AM–10PM	6AM–10PM	6AM–10PM
552	Aloha Stadium – Halawa Heights	Travels between Halawa Heights and Hālawa/Aloha Stadium station via Aliipoe Street. Renumbered from Route 74	Halawa Heights, Aliipoe Street, Hālawa/Aloha Stadium station. Interlines with Route 551	4AM–10PM	6AM–10PM	6AM–10PM
651	Kaneohe Circulator	Travels between Windward Mall and Windward City Shopping Center via Puohala St.	Windward Mall, Windward City Shopping Center, Pohai Nani	4:30AM-10PM	6AM-9PM	6AM-9PM
671	Kailua – Lanikai	Travels between Kailua and Lanikai. Interlines with routes 672, 673 and 674 on select trips.	Kailua Town, Kailua Beach Park, Lanikai	6AM–8PM	6AM–7PM	6AM–7PM
672	Maunawili – Kailua	Travels between Kailua and Maunawili. Interlines with routes 671, 673 and 674 on select trips.	Kailua Town, Castle Medical Center, Maunawili	6AM–8PM	6AM–7PM	6AM–7PM
673	Kailua – Enchanted Lake – Keolu	Travels between Kailua and Keolu Hills via Keolu Drive. Interlines with routes 671, 672 and 674 on select trips.	Kailua Town, Enchanted Lake Shopping Center, Keolu Hills	6AM–7PM	6AM–6PM	6AM–6PM
674	Aikahi – Kailua	Travels between Kailua and Aikahi Park via Kuʻulei Road and Kalaheo Avenue. Interlines with routes 671, 672 and 673 on select trips.	Kailua Town, Aikahi Park Shopping Center	6AM-8:40PM	6AM–7:30PM	6AM–7:30PM

== Rush Hour Express routes ==
Route	Name	Description	Areas Served	Notes
80	Hawaiʻi Kai Express	Travels limited-stop between Downtown Honolulu to Hawaiʻi Kai via ʻĀina Haina, Niu Valley, and Kuliʻouʻou.	Hawaiʻi Kai Park & Ride, ʻĀina Haina, Niu Valley, Kuliʻouʻou	Shares service with Route 82 and PH6.
81	Waipahu Express	Travels limited-stop between Waipahu and Downtown Honolulu via Chinatown and Alapaʻi Transit Center.	Waipahu, Chinatown, Downtown Honolulu	
82	Kalama Valley Express	Travels limited-stop between Downtown Honolulu to Kalama Valley via ʻĀina Haina, Niu Valley, and Kuliʻouʻou.	Hawaiʻi Kai Park & Ride, Kalama Valley, ʻĀina Haina, Niu Valley, Kuliʻouʻou	Shares service with Route 80 and PH6.
83	Wahiawā Town Express	Travels limited-stop between Wahiawā, Haleʻiwa, Waialua, Wahiawā Heights, and Downtown Honolulu.	Wahiawā Transit Center, Chinatown, Alapaʻi Transit Center	
84	Mililani Express North	Travels limited-stop between Mililani (from Wahiawā Park & Ride) and Downtown Honolulu.	Alapaʻi Transit Center, Mililani Transit Center	
84A	Mililani Express South	Travels limited-stop between Mililani (via Meheula Parkway and Lanikuhana in a loop pattern) and Chinatown and Downtown Honolulu.	Alapaʻi Transit Center, Mililani Transit Center	
85	Windward Express – Aikahi	Travels limited-stop between ʻAikahi, Kāneʻohe, Puohala, and Downtown Honolulu via Likelike	Alapaʻi Transit Center, Downtown Honolulu	
86	Windward Express – Kāneʻohe	Travels limited-stop between Kāneʻohe and Downtown Honolulu via Likelike Highway	Alapaʻi Transit Center, Downtown Honolulu	
87	Windward Express – Kailua	Travels limited-stop between Kailua and Downtown Honolulu via Pali Highway	Alapaʻi Transit Center, Downtown Honolulu	
88	Windward Express – Kahaluu via Kahekili	Travels limited-stop between Ahuimanu and Downtown Honolulu via Kahekili and Likelike Highways.	Alapaʻi Transit Center, and Ahuimanu.	
88A	North Shore Express	Travels limited-stop between Wahiawa Transit Center, North Shore, Downtown Honolulu and Ala Moana Center via Kamehameha, Kahekili and Likelike Highways.	Kaneohe, North Shore, Turtle Bay Resort, Wahiawā, Mililani, Pearl City	
89	Windward Express – Waimānalo	Travels limited-stop between Downtown Honolulu and Waimānalo.	Castle Medical Center and Alapaʻi Transit Center	
90	Pearl City Express	Travels limited-stop between Pearl City and Downtown Honolulu.	Alapaʻi Transit Center	
91	ʻEwa Beach Express	Travels limited-stop between ʻEwa Beach and Downtown Honolulu via Fort Weaver Road and H-1 Freeway.	Ewa, Chinatown, Downtown Honolulu, Alapaʻi Transit Center	
91A	ʻEwa Gentry Express	Travels limited-stop between ʻEwa Gentry and Downtown Honolulu	Chinatown, Downtown Honolulu, Alapaʻi Transit Center	
92	Makakilo Heights Express	Travels limited-stop between Makakilo Heights and Downtown Honolulu.	Alapaʻi Transit Center, Chinatown	
93	Mākaha Express	Travels limited-stop between Mākaha and Downtown Honolulu. Interlines with Route 40 on select trips.	Waiʻanae, Māʻili, Nānākuli, Chinatown, Alapaʻi Transit Center	
94	Villages of Kapolei Express	Travels limited-stop between Downtown Honolulu and the Villages of Kapolei; formerly served by Route 102	Chinatown, Downtown Honolulu, Alapaʻi Transit Center	
95	Kapolei Homesteads Express	Travels limited-stop between Downtown Honolulu and the Villages of Kapolei; formerly served by Route 102	Kapolei Transit Center, Chinatown, Downtown Honolulu, Alapaʻi Transit Center	
96	Waipiʻo Gentry Express	Travels limited-stop between Waipiʻo and Downtown Honolulu	Waipiʻo Uka, Chinatown, Downtown Honolulu, and Alapaʻi Transit Center	
96A	Waikele Express	Travels limited-stop between Waikele and Downtown Honolulu	Chinatown, Downtown Honolulu, Alapaʻi Transit Center, Waikele Premium Outlets.	
97	Village Park Express	Travels limited-stop between Village Park and Downtown Honolulu.	Chinatown, Downtown Honolulu, and Alapaʻi Transit Center	
98	Mililani-Wahiawā Park & Ride Express	Travels limited-stop between Wahiawā and Downtown Honolulu via Mililani, Palama, Chinatown, and Honolulu Civic Center.	Wahiawā Park & Ride, Mililani Park & Ride, Alapaʻi Transit Center	
98A	Mililani TC and Park & Ride Express	Travels limited-stop between Wahiawa Park and Ride and Downtown Honolulu via Mililani Town.	Wahiawā Park & Ride, Mililani Transit Center, Downtown Honolulu	
99	Wahiawā-Mililani-Waipahu-Kapolei	Travels limited-stop between Kapolei and Wahiawā via Waipahu, Waikele, Waipi'o Gentry and Mililani Town. This route does not serve Downtown Honolulu.	Keoneʻae/UH West Oahu station, Pouhala/Waipahu Transit Center station, Waikele Premium Outlets, Mililani Transit Center	

=== Pearl Harbor express routes ===
Route	Name	Description
PH1	Waianae Coast – Pearl Harbor Express	Travels limited-stop between Mākaha and Pearl Harbor via Waiʻanae, Māʻili, Nānākuli, Kapolei, and Pearl Harbor. Serves Waiʻanae Transit Center and Kapolei Transit Center.
PH2	Mililani – Pearl Harbor Express	Travels between Mililani and Pearl Harbor via H-1 and H-2 Freeways.
PH3	Wahiawā – Pearl Harbor Express	Travels between Wahiawā Heights, Wahiawā Transit Center and Pearl Harbor via H-1 Freeway and Kamehameha Highway.
PH4	Pearl Harbor – Windward Oahu Express	Travels between Ahuimanu and Pearl Harbor via H-3 Freeway, Kailua, Aikahi and Kāne'ohe. Aikahi and Kailua segment of Route PH4 was labeled as Route PH5. Route PH5 skipped past Kāneʻohe and Ahuimanu via H-3 Freeway, Kāneʻohe Bay Drive, and Mokapu Road
PH6	Pearl Harbor – Hawaiʻi Kai Express	Connects Hawaiʻi Kai, ʻĀina Haina, Downtown Honolulu, and Pearl Harbor. Serves Hawaiʻi Kai Park & Ride.
PH7	Ewa Beach – Pearl Harbor Express	Connects Ewa Beach and Pearl Harbor. Serves Ewa Beach Transit Center.
PH8	Makalapa – Pearl Harbor Express	Travels between Makalapa/Pearl Harbor station and Pearl Harbor.

=== Waikīkī express routes ===
Route	Name	Description
W1	ʻEwa Beach via Waipahu – Waikīkī	Travels limited-stop between ʻEwa Beach and Waikīkī via Pouhala/Waipahu Transit Center station, Nimitz Highway, and Ala Moana Boulevard. Does not service between Nimitz Highway and Ala Moana Center.
W2	Waipahu via Paiwa – Waikīkī	Travels limited-stop between East Waipahu and Waikīkī via Nimitz Highway and Ala Moana Boulevard. Does not service between Nimitz Highway and Ala Moana Center.
W3	Kalihi – Waikīkī via H-1 Freeway	Travels limited-stop on School Street all the way to Waikīkī via H-1 Freeway. Serves Kalihi Transit Center. Does not service between School Street/Momolio Street to Hilton Hawaiian Village. Local service on School Street during PM Hours ONLY.

== Transit centers and transfer points ==
Name	Routes served	Ref
Āhua/Lagoon Drive station	A, U, W, 40, 42, 51	
Ala Moana Center	A, C, E, W, 3, 5, 6, 7, 8, 13, 40, 42, 51, 52, 53, 60, 65, 67, 88A, 102	
Alapaʻi Transit Center	A, C, E, 1, 1L, 2, 2L, 3, 4, 13, 40, 42, 51, 52, 53, 54, 80, 81, 82, 83, 84, 84A, 85, 86, 87, 88, 89, 90, 91, 91A, 92, 93, 94, 95, 96, 96A, 97, 98, 98A, 122, 123	
Downtown	A, C, E, W, 1, 1L, 2, 2L, 3, 4, 6, 7, 13, 40, 42, 51, 52, 53, 54, 60, 65, 66, 67, 80, 81, 82, 83, 84, 84A, 85, 86, 87, 88, 88A, 89, 90, 91, 91A, 92, 93, 94, 95, 96, 96A, 97, 98, 98A, 122, 151, PH6	
ʻEwa Beach Transit Center	E, 41, 42, 47, 91, 421, PH7, W1	
Hālawa/Aloha Stadium station	1L, 32, 40, 42, 51, 551, 552, PH1, PH2, PH3, PH4, PH7	
Hawaiʻi Kai Towne Center/Park & Ride	1, 1L, 23, 80, 82, PH6	
Hōʻaeʻae/West Loch station	E, 40, 42, 43, 44, 81, 99, 444, W1	
Kahala Mall	1, 1L, 2, 2L, 7, 14, 23, 234	
Kailua Town Center	66, 67, 87, 671, 672, 673, 674, PH4	
Kalauao/Pearlridge station	32, 40, 42, 51, 53, 541, 542, 544, 545	
Kapolei Transit Center	40, 41, 46, 95, 99, 411, 413, 414, 415, 416	
Kapiolani Community College	2, 2L, 3, 200	
Keoneʻae/UH West Oahu station	C, 40, 44, 46, 47, 95, 99, 416, 461	
Kualakaʻi/East Kapolei station	C, 44, 46, 47, 95, 416	
Kahauiki/Middle Street–Kalihi Transit Center station	C, 1, 1L, 2, 2L, 32, 40, 42, 51, 52, 61, 301, 302, 306, 307, W3	
Mililani Park & Ride	52, 98, 98A, 501, PH2	
Mililani Transit Center	51, 52, 84, 84A, 98A, 99, 501, 503, 504	
Pouhala/Waipahu Transit Center station	E, 40, 42, 43, 99, 433, W1	
University of Hawaiʻi at Mānoa	A, U, 4, 6, 13	
Waiawa/Pearl Highlands station	43, 51, 531, 532, 533, 535	
Wahiawā Armory Park & Ride	51, 52, 83, 84, 88A, 98, 98A, 503	
Wahiawā Transit Center	51, 52, 83, 88A, 99, 511, 512, PH3	
Waiʻanae Transit Center	C, 40, 93, 401, 402, 403, PH1	
Waikiki	E, W, 2, 2L, 4, 8, 13, 14, 42, 200, W1, W2, W3	
Windward Mall	60, 61, 65, 86, 651, PH4	
