= ʻEwa District, Hawaii =

ʻEwa
- District
- Etymology: "Crooked"
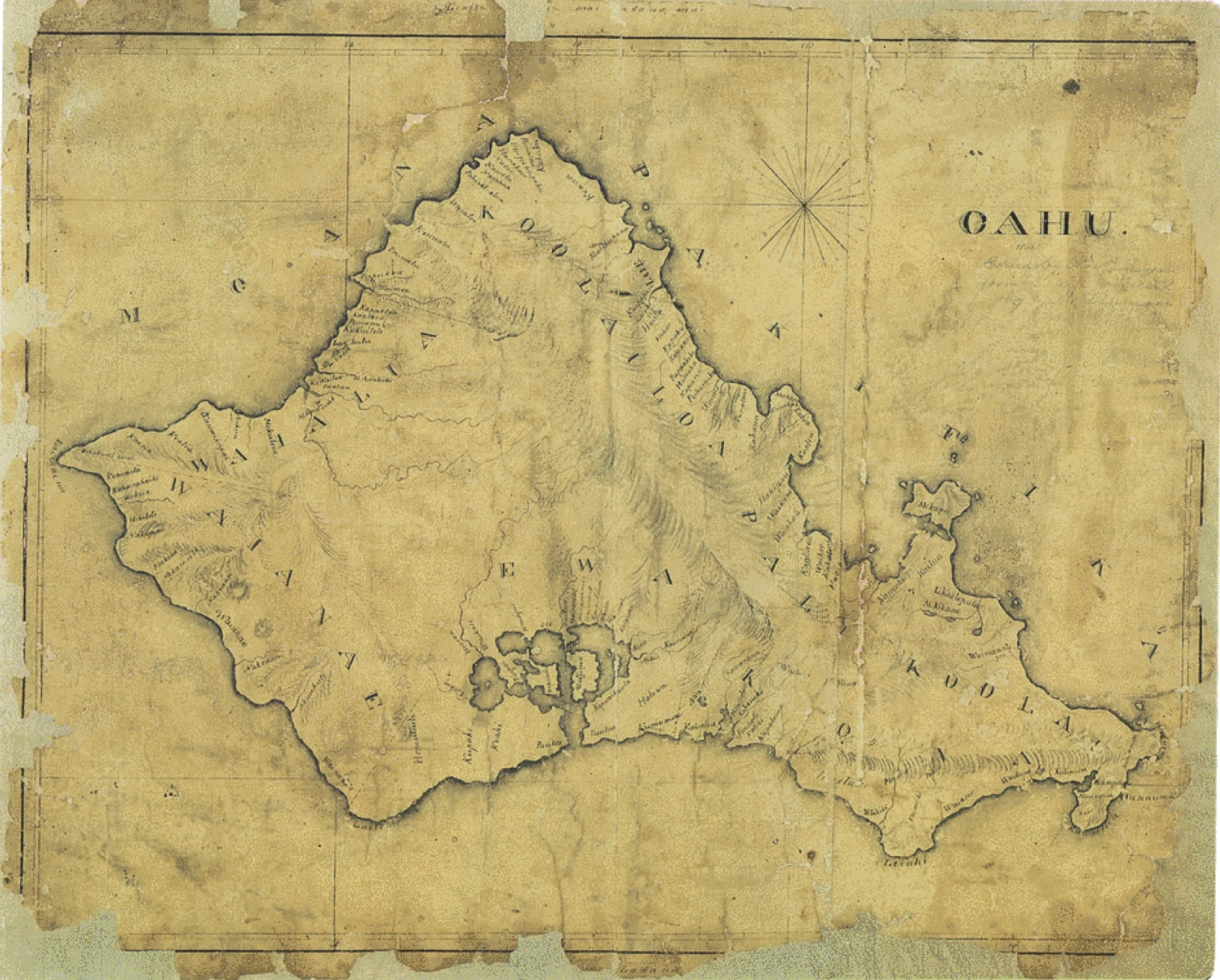
- Outline of the ʻEwa District from a 19th century Hawaiian map
- Country: United States
- State: Hawaii

ʻEwa was one of the original districts, known as moku, of the island of Oʻahu in Ancient Hawaii history.

The word ʻewa means "crooked" or "ill-fitting" in Hawaiian. The name comes from the myth that the gods Kāne and Kanaloa threw a stone to determine the boundaries, but it was lost and later found at Pili o Kahe.

ʻEwa is used in Honolulu to indicate the western direction, in opposition to Diamond Head for the eastern direction.

== See also ==
- ʻEwa Villages, Hawaii
- ʻEwa Gentry, Hawaii
- ʻEwa Beach, Hawaii
