= Kahauiki station =

Honolulu Skyline station

Kahauiki Middle Street–Kalihi Transit Center
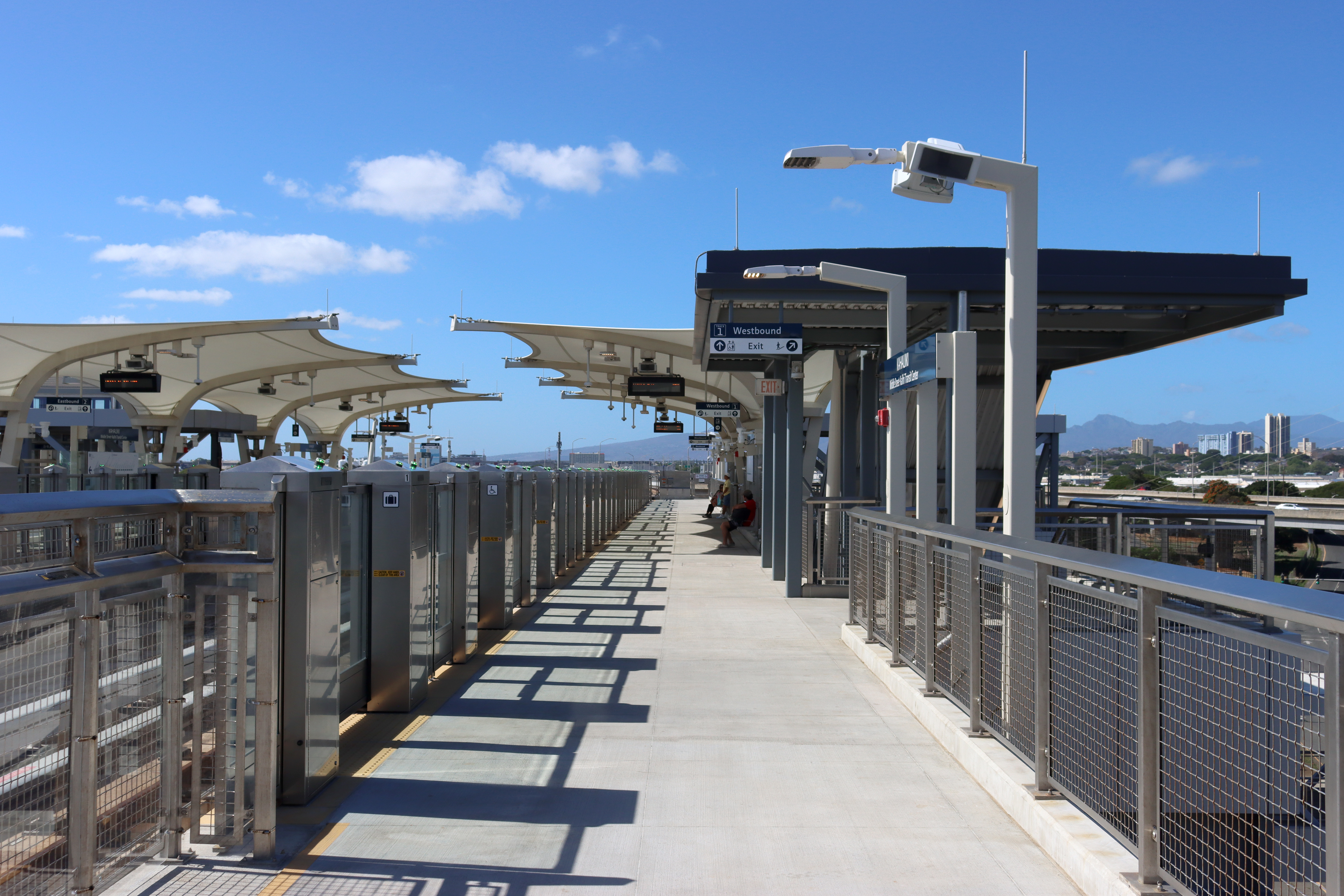
- Platform for Track 1 Westbound

General information
- Location: Kamehameha Highway & Middle Street; Honolulu, Hawaiʻi
- Coordinates: 21°19′58″N 157°53′18″W
- Owner: Honolulu Department of Transportation Services
- Platforms: 2 side platforms
- Tracks: 2
- Bus routes: TheBus: C, 1, 1L, 2, 2L, 32, 40, 42, 51, 52, 61, 301, 302, 306, 307, W3
- Bus stands: 8

Construction
- Structure type: Elevated
- Accessible: Yes

History
- Opened: October 16, 2025; 10 months ago

Services
| Preceding station | Skyline | Following station |
|---|---|---|
| Āhua toward Kualakaʻi | Skyline | Terminus |

Future services
| Preceding station | Skyline | Following station |
|---|---|---|
| Āhua toward Kualakaʻi | Skyline (Segment 3) | Mokauea toward Kaʻākaukukui |
Location

Kahauiki station (also known as the Middle Street–Kalihi Transit Center) is a Skyline station in Honolulu, Hawaiʻi. It is part of Segment 2 of the Skyline route, which opened on October 16, 2025.

The Hawaiian Station Name Working Group proposed Hawaiian names for the twelve rail stations on the eastern end of the rail system (stations in the Airport and City Center segments) in April 2019. The Hawaiian name for this station, "Kahauiki" (or "Hauiki), means "the little hau/hibiscus tree" and refers to an ahupuaʻa bounded by the Kalihi ahupuaʻa (to the east) and the Moanalua ahupuaʻa (to the west).
