= Kualakaʻi station =

Honolulu Skyline station

Kualakaʻi East Kapolei
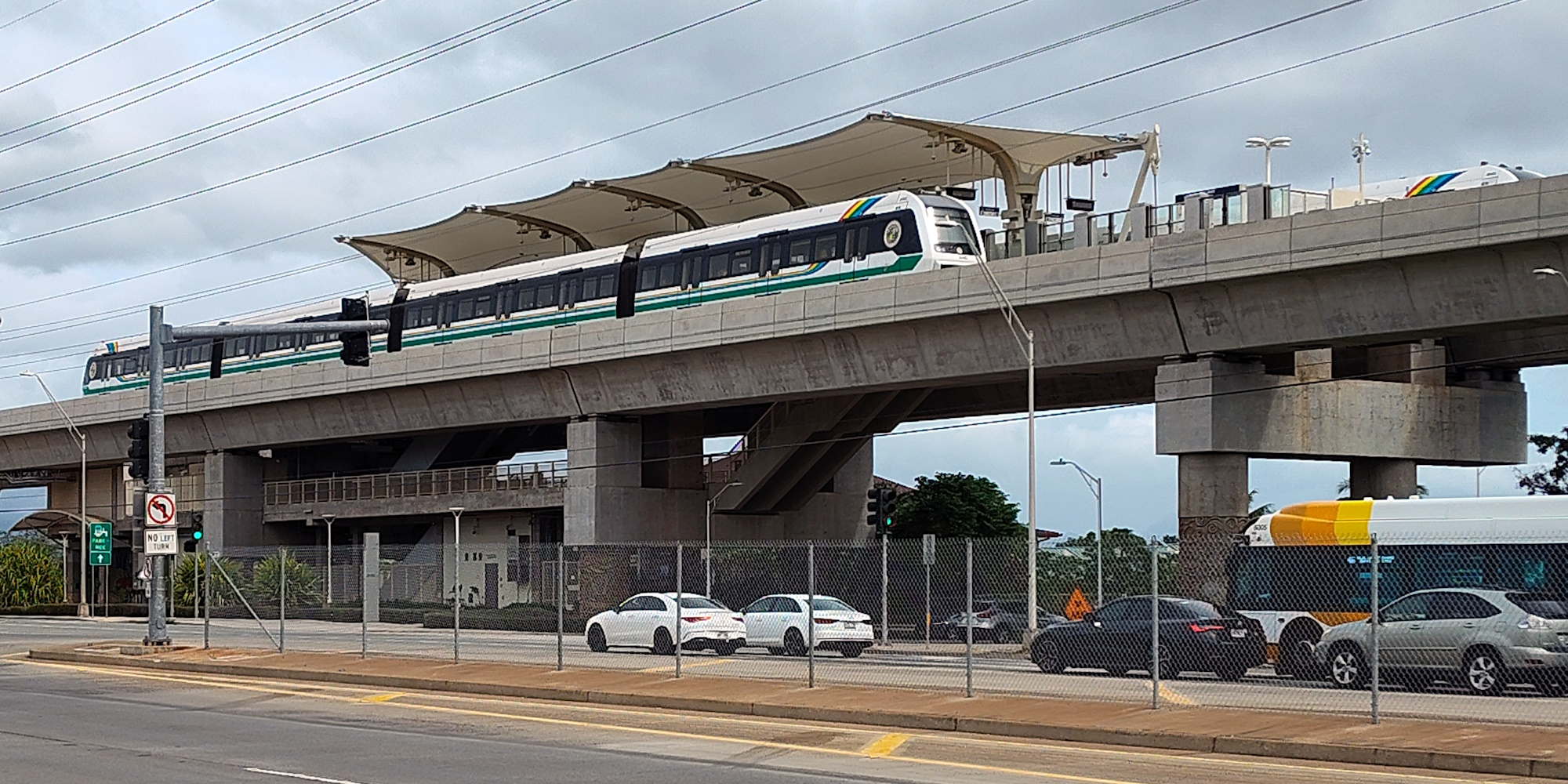
- Kualakaʻi station in December 2025

General information
- Location: 91-3253 Kualakaʻi Parkway; East Kapolei, Hawaiʻi
- Coordinates: 21°20′44″N 158°03′06″W
- Owner: Honolulu Department of Transportation Services
- Platforms: 1 island platform
- Tracks: 2
- Connections: TheBus: C, 44, 46, 47, 95, 416

Construction
- Structure type: Elevated
- Accessible: Yes

History
- Opened: June 30, 2023; 3 years ago

Services
Preceding station	Skyline	Following station
Terminus	Skyline	Keoneʻae toward Kahauiki
Location

Kualakaʻi station (also known as East Kapolei station) is an elevated Skyline metro station in East Kapolei, Hawaiʻi. The station is located alongside Kualakaʻi Parkway above its intersection with Keahumoa Parkway. The station opened on June 30, 2023, and serves as the western terminus of the line. A 900-space park and ride lot will be added at the station site eventually.

In Hawaiian, "kualakaʻi" means "to show the way, stand and lead". The Hawaiian Station Name Working Group proposed Hawaiian names for the nine rail stations on the ʻEwa end of the rail system (stations west of and including Aloha Stadium) in November 2017, and HART adopted the proposed names on February 22, 2018.

== Service ==
Skyline trains run every 10 minutes. Service operates from 5 a.m. to 7 p.m. on weekdays and from 8 a.m. to 7 p.m. on weekends and holidays.

== Station information ==
When all 19 stations are open in 2031, Kualakaʻi is projected to rank eighth in boardings at 3,680 per day.

It is estimated that 60% of riders will get to or from station via TheBus, with the other 40% walking or biking.

Public art is present at the station via the Station Art Program. A glazed ceramic wall mural is present at the station's entrance, titled Haʻaheo I Nā Hala A Me Nā Koʻoloa ʻUla O Kualakaʻi (Cherished Are the Hala and Koʻoloa ʻUla of Kualakaʻi) by local artist Bob Flint. The mural depicts two varieties of native trees, hala and koʻoloa ʻula, that once flourished in the area.

== Surrounding area ==
The East Kapolei area is likely to see considerable growth in the future, and most land surrounding the station is owned by the Department of Hawaiian Home Lands (DHHL) and the University of Hawaiʻi at West Oʻahu. Long-term plans in the area include a new elementary school, the building of nearly 1,000 DHHL homes, and housing and commercial uses for land owned by the University of Hawaiʻi.

The station is located a five-minute walk from Ko‘oloa‘ula, a 308-unit affordable rental apartment complex, and Ka‘uluokaha‘i, a DHHL subdivision of 150 homes, with 850 additional homes planned to be constructed in the future. It is a 20-minute walk from Ka Makana Ali‘i shopping center, which also includes a movie theatre and hotel. The shopping center is also served by TheBus routed 46 and 461.
