= List of Hawaii waterfalls =

Hawaii waterfalls are one of the U.S. state of Hawaii's great visitor attractions.

Hawaii waterfalls
Name	Island	Height (feet)	Height (meters)	Notes
ʻAkaka Falls	Hawaii	442	135	
Hiilawe Waterfall	Hawaii	1,450	440	
Mount Waialeale Falls	Hawaii			Wall of Tears
Onomea Falls	Hawaii			
Rainbow Falls (Hawaii)	Hawaii	80	24	
Umauma Falls	Hawaii			
Waihilau Falls	Hawaii	2,600	790	
Waiilikahi Falls	Hawaii	1,080	330	
Hanakapiai Falls	Kauai	300	91	
Hoolea Falls	Kauai			
Hoʻopiʻi Falls	Kauai			
Kipu Falls	Kauai			
Manawaiopuna Falls	Kauai	400	120	
ʻŌpaekaʻa Falls	Kauai	150	46	
Uluwehi Falls	Kauai	100	30	Difficult terrain. Kayak/canoe access.
Wailua Falls	Kauai	173	53	
Alelele Falls	Maui			Kipahulu District of Haleakala National Park
Kopiliula Falls	Maui			
Honokohau Falls	Maui	1,100	340	No access on foot.
Makahiku Falls	Maui	200	61	
Pools of Oheo	Maui			Seven pools Haleakala National Park
Puaa Kaa Falls	Maui			
Twin Falls	Maui			
Waikani Falls	Maui			
Waimoku Falls	Maui	400	120	Pipiwai Trail in Haleakalā National Park
Kahiwa Falls	Molokai	2,165	660	
Moalua Falls	Molokai	250	76	
Oloʻupena Falls	Molokai	2,953	900	
Papalaua Falls	Molokai	1,250	380	
Puʻukaʻoku Falls	Molokai	2,700	820	
Kaipapau Falls	Oahu			Long hike to access
Kaliuwaa Falls	Oahu	1,100	340	Closed to the public
Kapena Falls	Oahu			
Lulumahu Falls	Oahu			Requires permit to visit
Manoa Falls	Oahu	150	46	
Waikahalulu Falls	Oahu			
Waipuhia Falls	Oahu			AKA Upside-down Falls. Difficult trail.

== See also ==
- List of waterfalls
- Hawaii Tropical Botanical Garden
- Reverse waterfall
