= Kahiwa Falls =

Waterfall in Hawaii

Coordinates: 21°10′21″N 156°48′39″W

Kahiwa Falls is a tiered waterfall in Hawaii on the northern shore of the island of Molokai between Wailau and Papalaua valleys. It is about 2,165 feet (660 meters) tall, although often only 1,749 feet (533 meters) of its drop are counted as the main fall.

The fall has 6 tiers, the highest drop of which is 600 feet (183 meters). It can be observed only from the sea or from air. During strong winds the waterfall may get caught and rise upwards.

== See also ==
- List of waterfalls
- List of Hawaii waterfalls
- Papalaua Falls
