= Sleeping Giant (Kauaʻi) =

Nounou the Sleeping Giant.

Sleeping Giant, also known as Nounou Mountain, is a mountain ridge located west of the towns Wailua and Kapaʻa in the Nounou Forest Reserve on the Hawaiian island of Kauaʻi. The formation received its common English name both from its resemblance to a reclining human figure, and from a Native Hawaiian legend about a giant who, after great labor or overeating, lay to rest and is yet to awaken. Today Sleeping Giant is a major landmark for tourists visiting Kauai. Hiking trails lead to the highest point of the ridge, or what resembles a forehead. It is located at 22°3′39″N 159°21′19″W.
