= Papalaua Falls =

Waterfall in Hawaii

- Aerial view in 2011

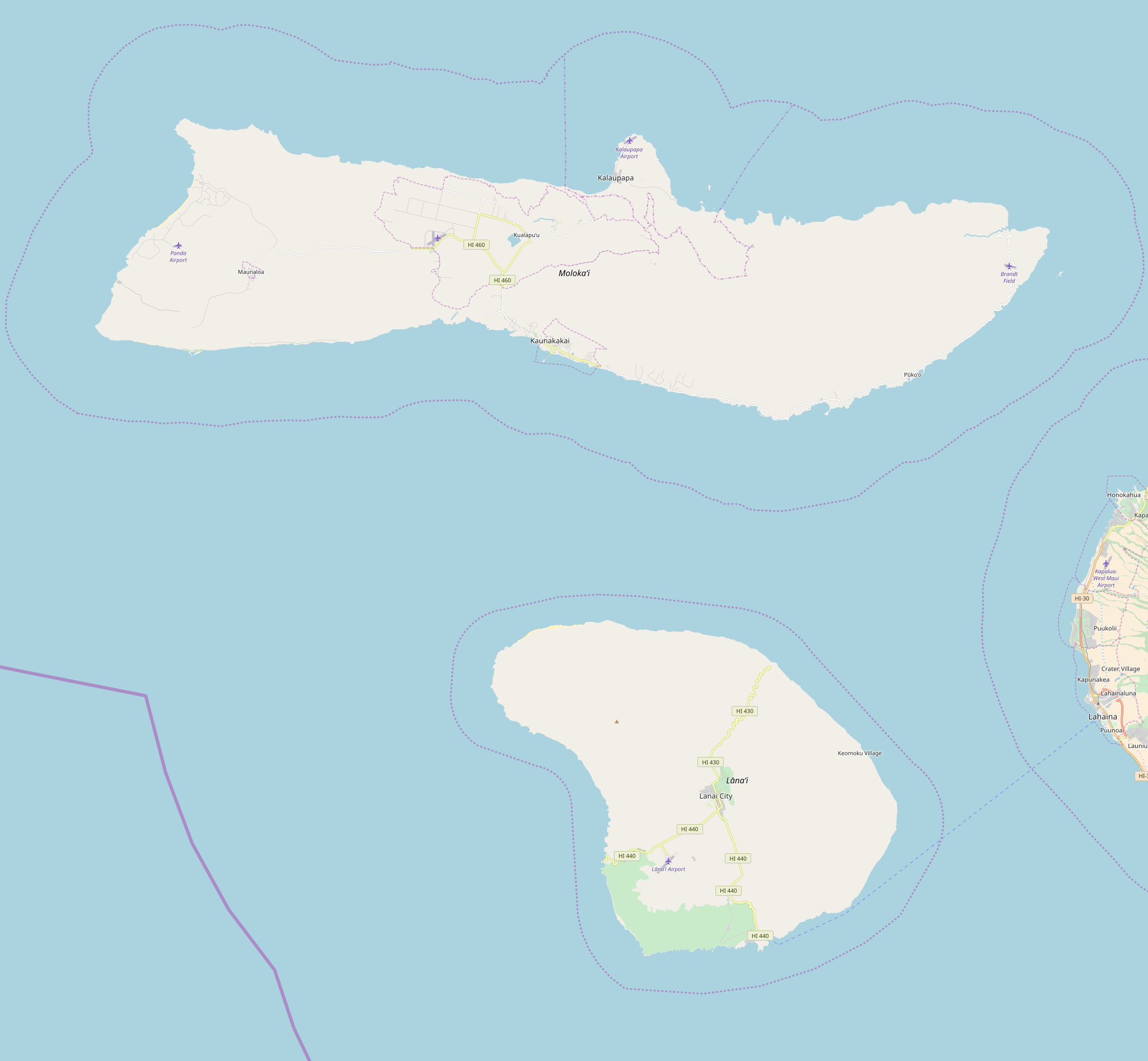
- Location within Molokai and Lanai Location within Hawaii
- Location: Molokai, Hawaii
- Coordinates: 21.161°N 156.804°W
- Total height: 1,250 ft (380 m)
- Number of drops: 5

Papalaua Falls is a waterfall on the northern shore of the Hawaiian island of Molokai, in the Papalaua Valley. Fed by the Kawai Nui stream, it flows for 501 m (1,644 ft) and carves out a very steep fissure. It has five drops, and the middle of the falls has a 340 m (1,120 ft) drop that can be seen from the sea, making it popular with aerial or boat tours of the island. While it flows all year round, it is especially powerful during the rainy season, from November to March. The waterfall is commonly misidentified as the nearby Kahiwa Falls. The area surrounding the waterfall still contains remnants of the terraces Native Hawaiians and Chinese used to grow taro. Its name comes from the word pāpala-ua, meaning "rain fog".

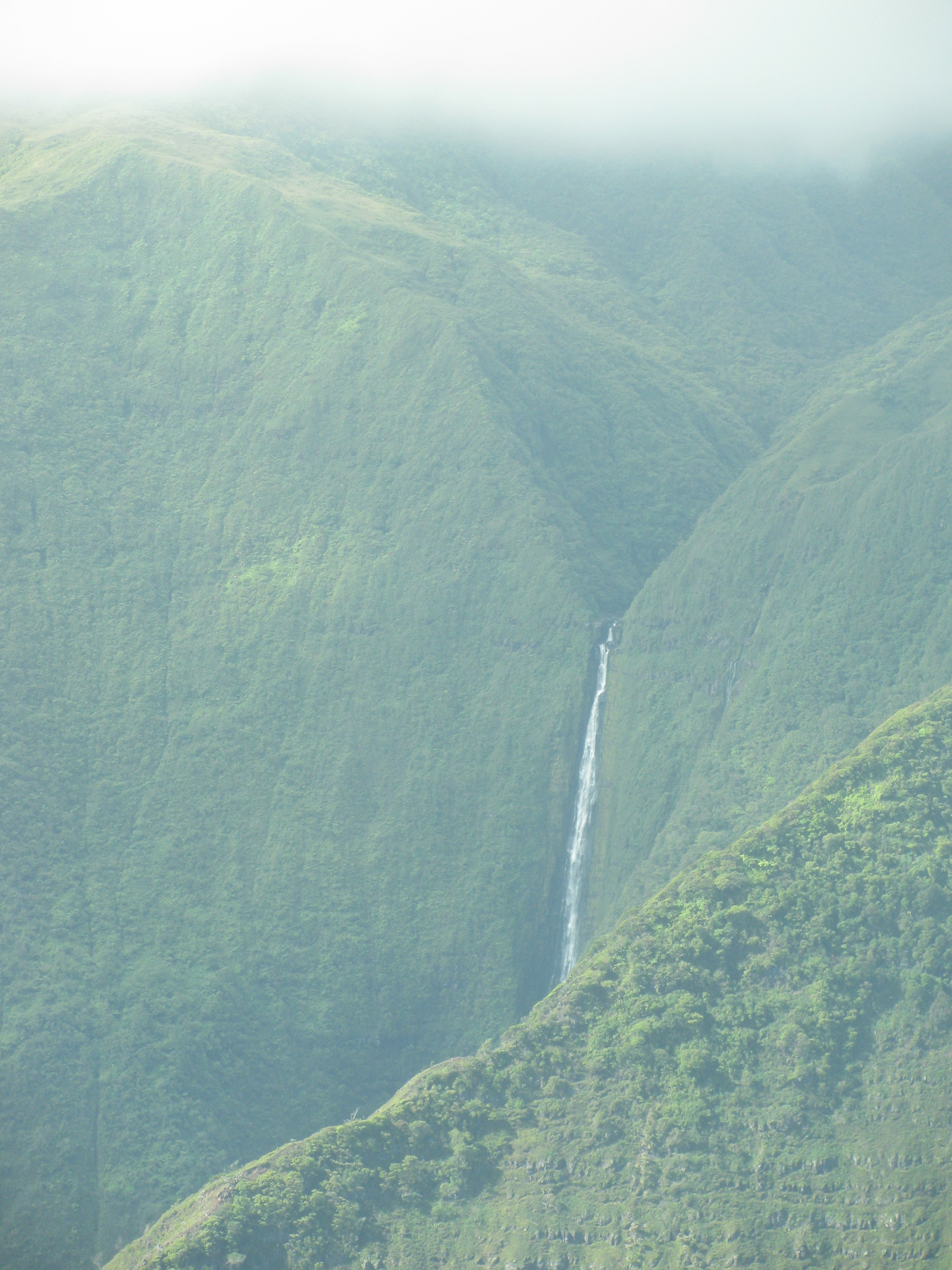
Aerial view in 2012

The lower part of the Papalaua Falls with the coast.

== See also ==
- List of waterfalls
- List of Hawaii waterfalls
- Kahiwa Falls
