= Oloʻupena Falls =

- Oloʻupena Falls in the center. Haloku Falls on the right.
- Interactive map of Oloʻupena Falls
- Location: Molokai, Hawaii, United States
- Coordinates: 21°9′21″N 156°51′24″W
- Type: Tiered
- Total height: 2,953 feet (900.07 m)
- World height ranking: 4

Oloʻupena Falls is a waterfall located in the north-eastern part of Hawaiian Island of Molokai, and at 2,953 feet (900 meters) is unofficially cited as the fourth highest waterfall in the world, and the highest in the United States.

The falls occur where a short, seasonal stream spills over the edge of one of the tallest sea-side cliffs of the world, located between the Pelekunu and Wailau valleys. They have eroded a groove in the cliff-face and can be observed only from the ocean or air.

Surroundings: From left to right: Wailele Falls, Pu'uka'oku Falls, Olo'upena Falls and Haloku Falls.

== See also ==
- List of waterfalls
- List of Hawaii waterfalls
- List of waterfalls by height
