= Makahiku Falls =

Coordinates: 20°40′07″N 156°03′09″W

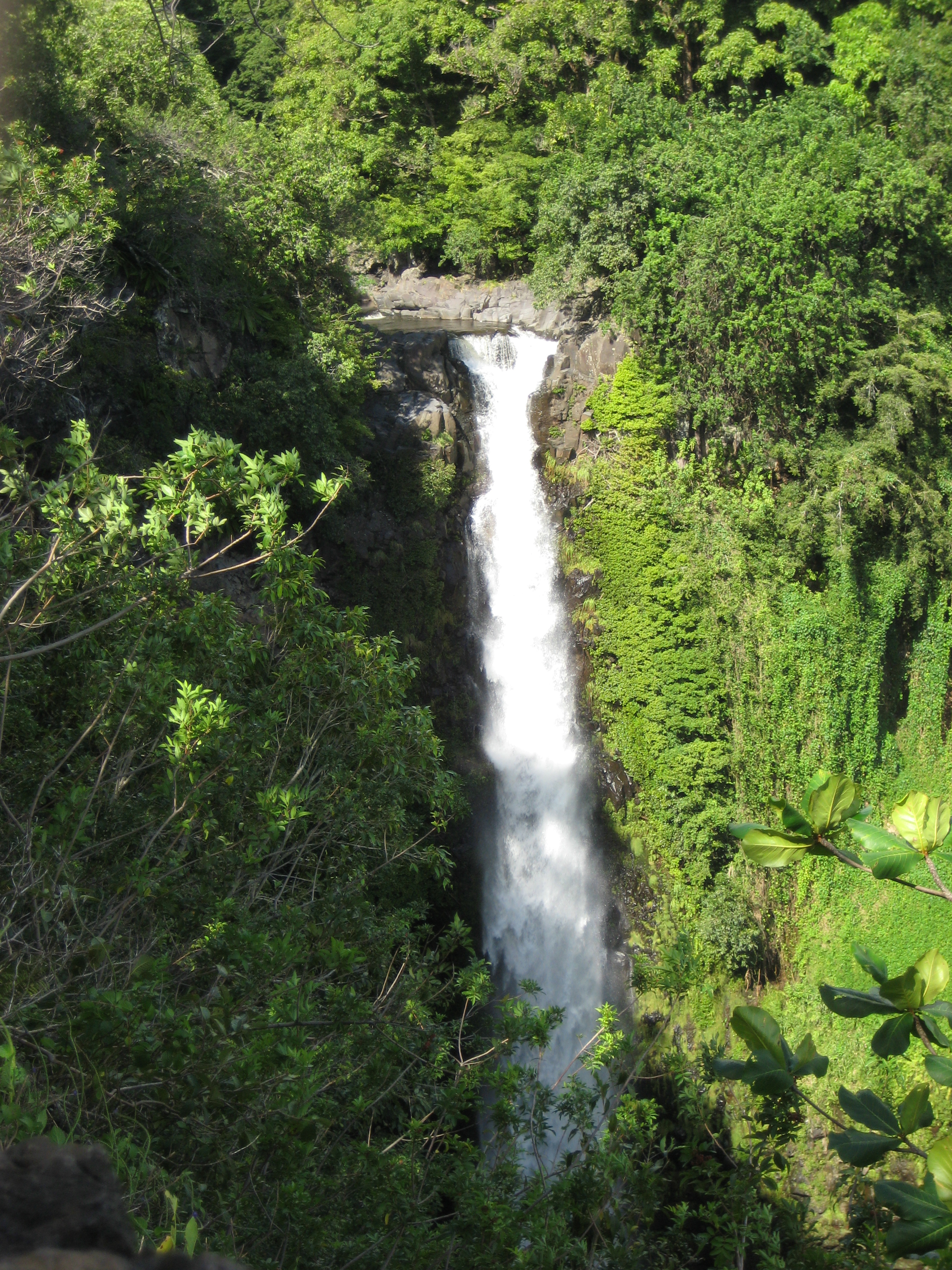
- Interactive map of Makahiku Falls
- Location: Haleakalā National Park, Maui, Hawaii, United States
- Type: Horsetail
- Total height: 200 ft (61 m)
- Number of drops: 1

Makahiku Falls is a 200-foot (61m) horsetail waterfall in Haleakalā National Park on the island of Maui in Hawaii. It runs on the Ohe'o Gulch stream. The falls is accessed by the Pipiwai Trail.

== See also ==
- List of waterfalls
- List of Hawaii waterfalls
