= Pipiwai Trail =

Hiking trail in Hawaii, United States

Coordinates: 20.668680°N 156.052610°W

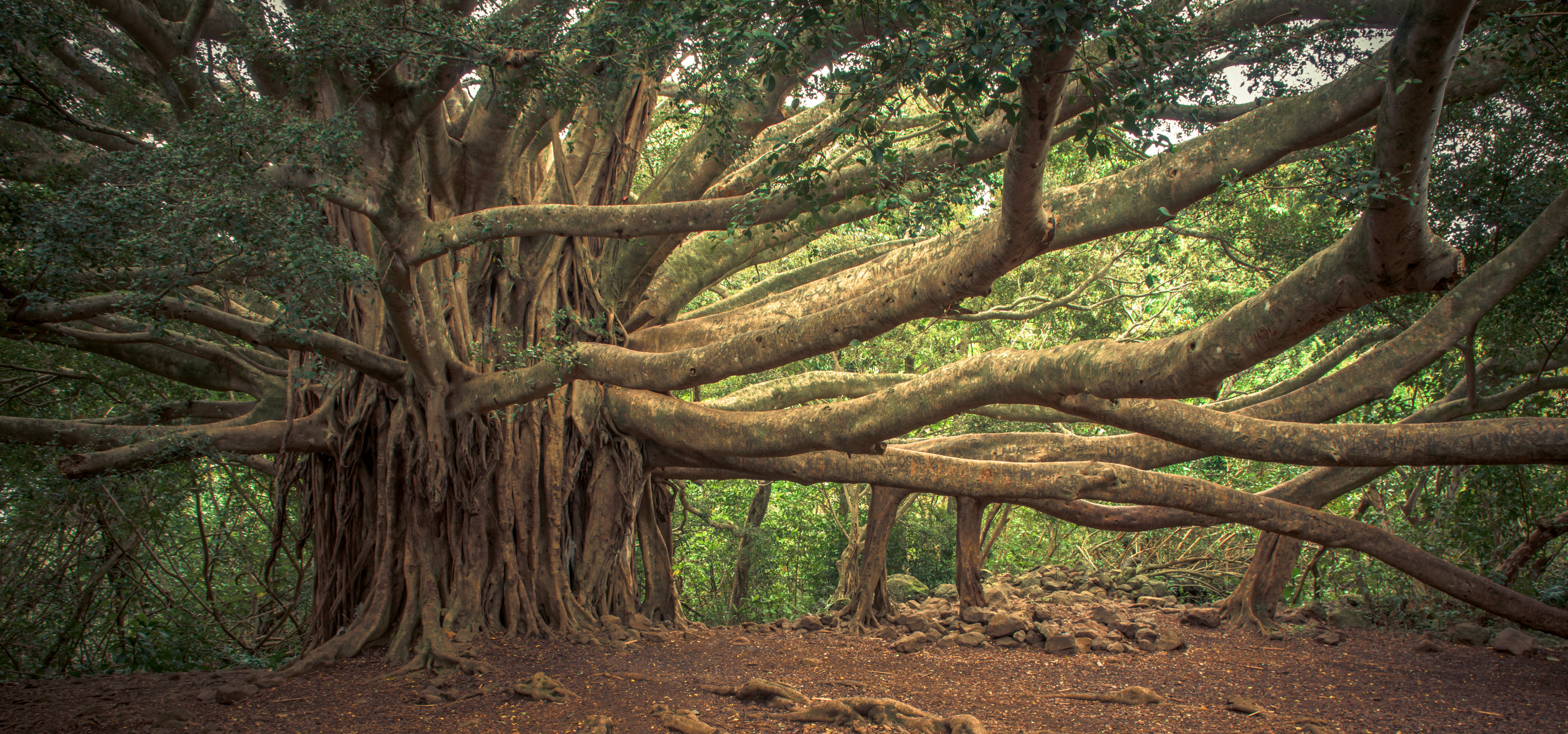
Giant banyan tree along the trail

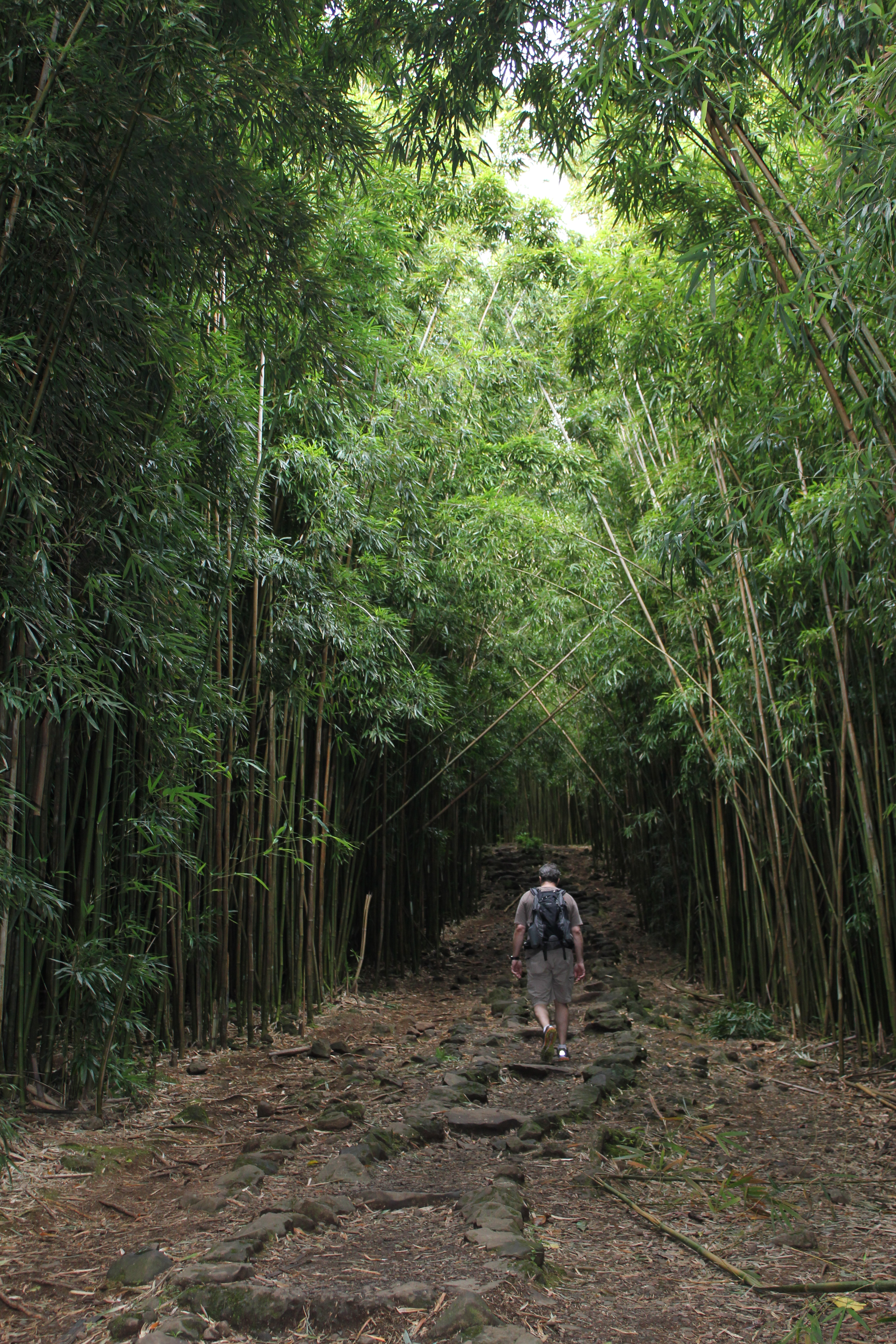
Bamboo forest along the trail

The Pipiwai Trail is a 4-mile (6.4 km) (round trip) hiking trail located on the island of Maui in the U.S. State of Hawaii. The hike leads up to the Makahiku Falls and Waimoku Falls. The trail is located in Haleakalā National Park and is generally well maintained. The trail runs around the Ohe'o Gulch Stream; notable locations passed include the bamboo forest and giant banyan tree.
