= Spouting Horn =

Blowhole on Kauai, Hawaii

Coordinates: 21.885018°N 159.493581°W

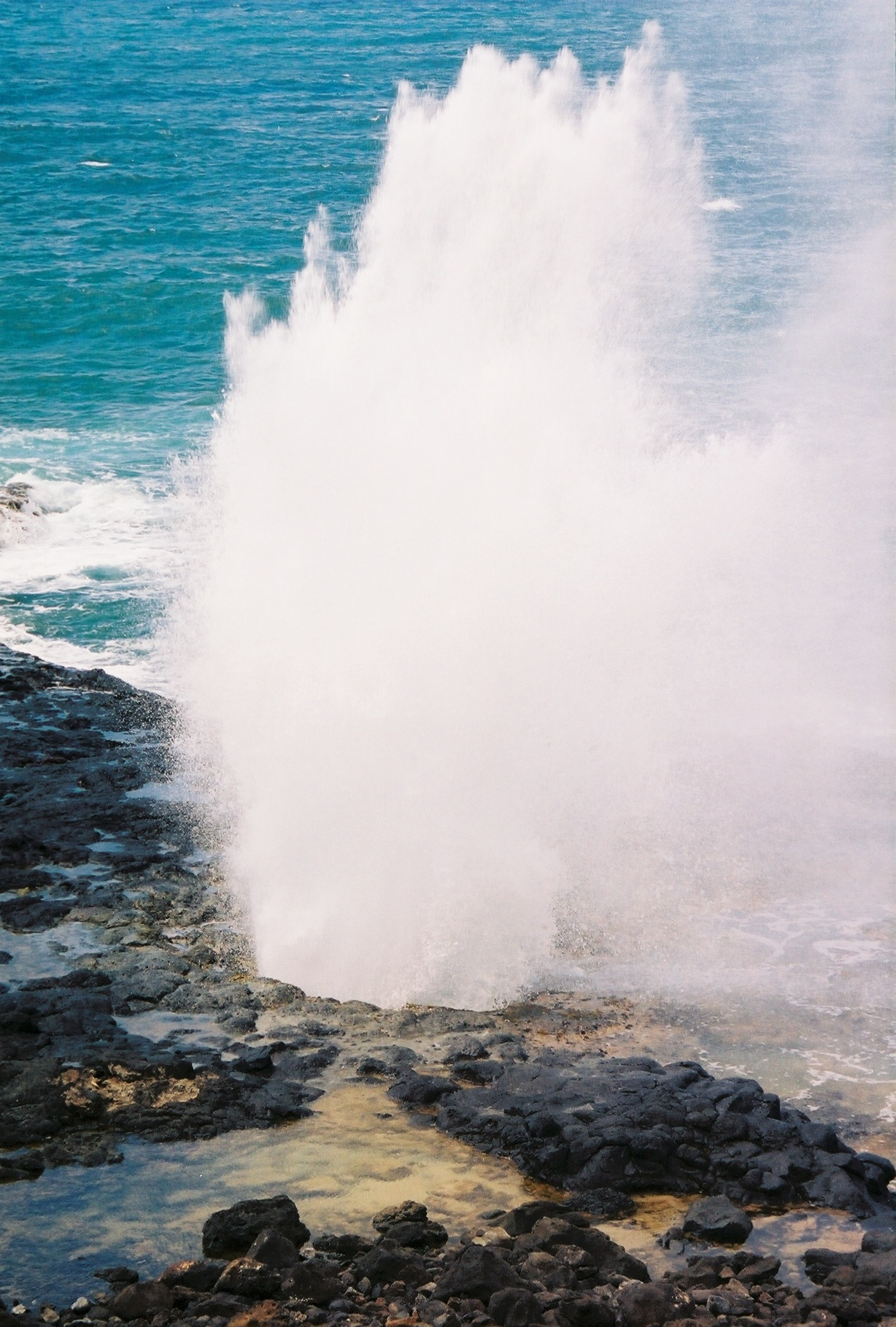
Spouting Horn

Spouting Horn is a blowhole located on the southern coast of Kauai in the Koloa district. This area of Kauai is known for its crashing waves (nearby Poipu translates to "crashing"). These waves erode lava rocks on the coastline which can create narrow openings, as is the case with Spouting Horn. With every wave, water shoots upward when it is forced through an opening and creates a sound suggestive of hissing. The spray can shoot as high as 50 feet in the air. The original Hawaiian name was puhi, meaning blowhole. The Spouting Horn is a part of the Koloa Heritage Trail, a 10-mile trail in the Koloa district.

== Legends ==
According to Hawaiian folklore, a giant lizard (“mo’o” in the Hawaiian language) once protected this area of the island. One day, a young man named Liko was swimming in a body of water, but the giant lizard saw Liko as danger, so she attacked him. Liko then jumped into the ocean, luring the lizard in the water. Liko then swam through a small lava tube in the rocks leading to the surface. The lizard followed Liko and got stuck in the lava tube, or blowhole. Today, you can hear the lizard's roar every time the Spouting Horn Blowhole blasts into the air.
