= Mānāwaiopuna Falls =

Waterfall in Kauaʻi, Hawaii, United States

Coordinates: 21°59′18″N 159°31′32″W

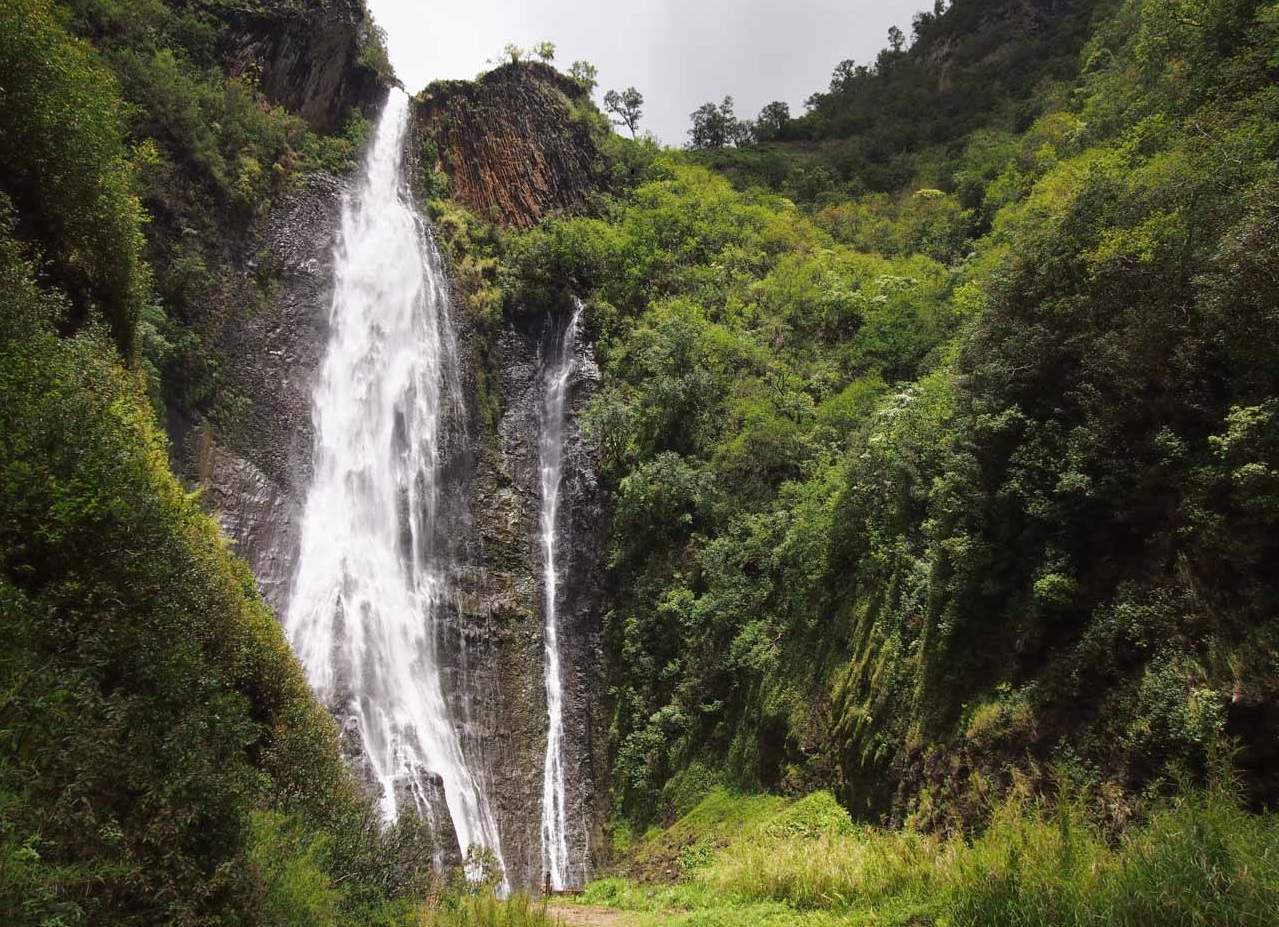
Mānāwaiopuna Falls

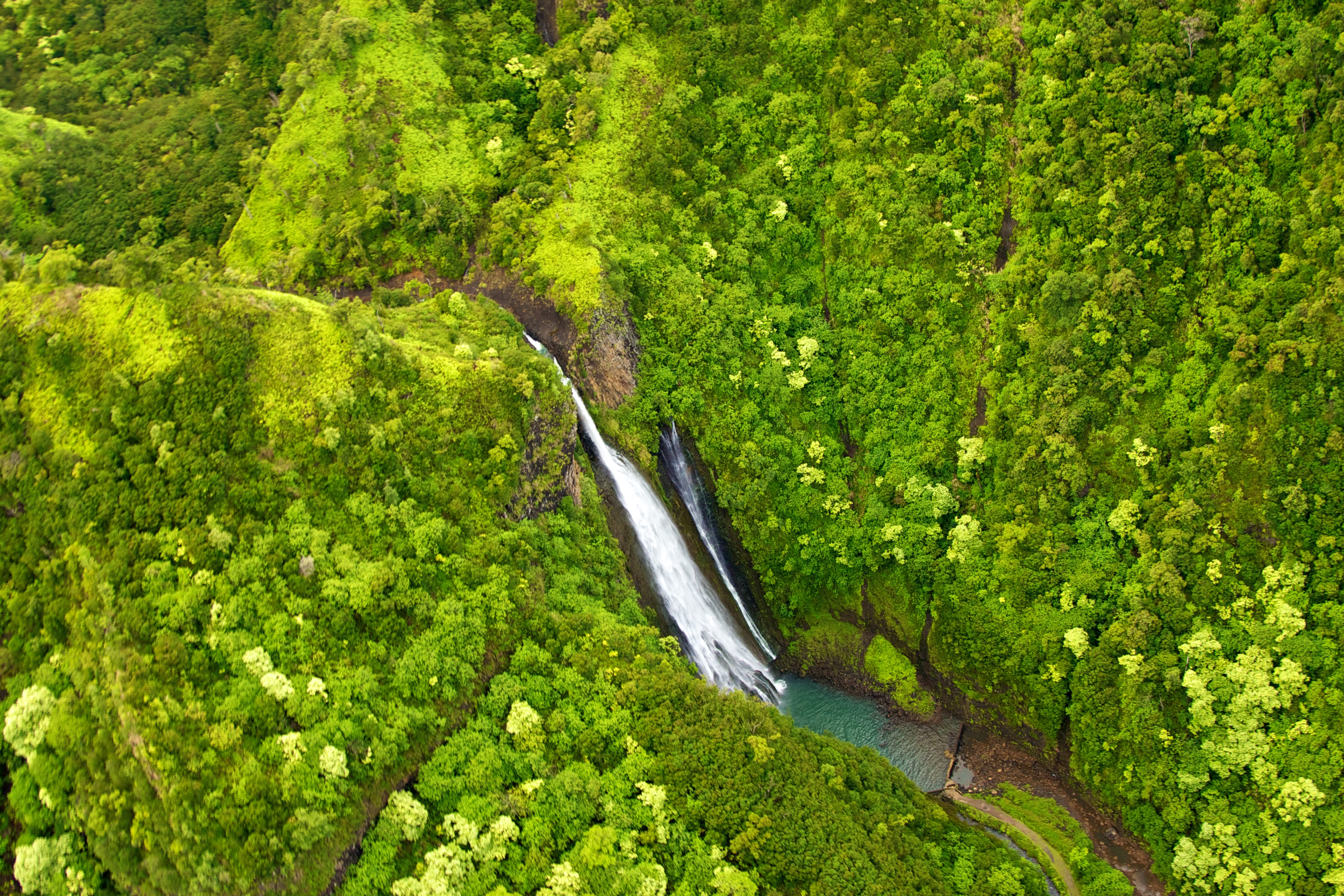
Mānāwaiopuna ("Jurassic") Falls as seen from a helicopter

Mānāwaiopuna Falls (colloquially known as Jurassic Falls) is a waterfall in the Hawaiian Islands, located in Hanapēpē Valley on Kauaʻi Island. It is 122 metres (400 ft) tall. It featured in the background of several scenes in the 1993 Steven Spielberg film Jurassic Park.

The waterfall is only accessible by helicopter. Landing near the falls was forbidden until 2009, after which Island Helicopters was allowed to land a limited number of times per week.

== See also ==
- List of waterfalls
- List of Hawaii waterfalls
