= Kauaʻi =

Fourth-largest island in Hawaii

Nickname: The Garden Isle
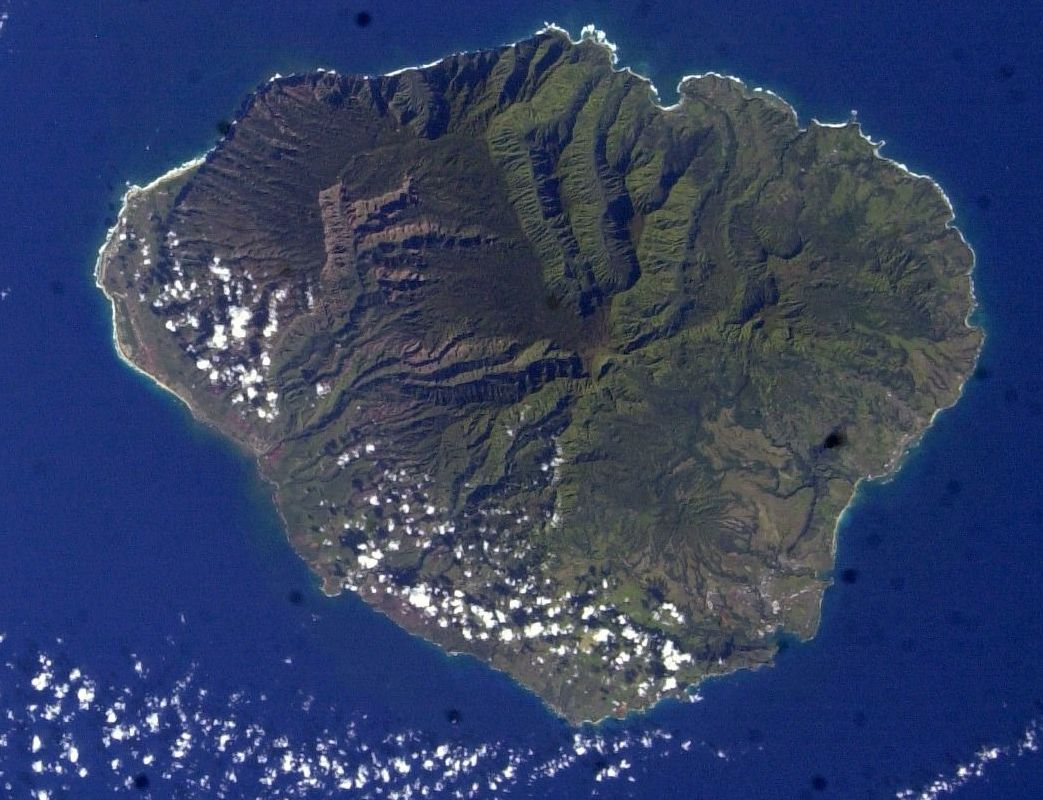
- March 2003 satellite photo

- Location in Hawaiʻi

Geography
- Coordinates: 22°04′12″N 159°29′51″W
- Area: 562.3 sq mi (1,456 km^{2})
- Area rank: 4th largest Hawaiian Island
- Highest elevation: 5,243 ft (1598.1 m)
- Highest point: Kawaikini

Administration
- United States
- Symbols
- Flower: Mokihana (Melicope anisata)
- Color: Poni (Purple)
- Largest settlement: Kapaʻa

Demographics
- Demonym: Kauaian
- Population: 73,298 (2020)
- Pop. density: 118/sq mi (45.6/km^{2})

Kauaʻi, (Note: English: /ˈkaʊaɪ/ KOW-eye or /kɑːˈwɑː.iː/ kah-WAH-ee; Hawaiian pronunciation: [kɐwˈwɐʔi].) sometimes written Kauai, (Note: In Hawaiian there is a glottal stop before the final i, spelled with the ʻokina. English speakers may approximate this by pronouncing the name as /kɑːˈwɑːiː/ kah-WAH-ee. Sometimes the ʻokina is approximated with an apostrophe or grave accent, as in Kaua'i and Kaua`i.) is one of the main Hawaiian Islands. It has an area of 562.3 square miles (1,456.4 km^{2}), making it the fourth largest of the islands and the 21st largest island in the United States. Kauaʻi is 73 mi (117 km) northwest of Oʻahu, across the Kauaʻi Channel. The island's 2020 population was 73,298.

Styling itself the "Garden Isle", Kauaʻi is the site of Waimea Canyon State Park and Nā Pali Coast State Park. It forms the bulk of Kauaʻi County, which includes Niʻihau as well as the small nearby islands of Kaʻula and Lehua.

== Etymology and language ==
Hawaiian narrative derives the name's origin from the legend of Hawaiʻiloa, the Polynesian navigator credited with discovering the Hawaiian Islands. The story relates that he named the island after a favorite son; a possible translation of Kauaʻi is "place around the neck", describing how a father would carry his child. Another possible translation is "food season".

Kauaʻi was known for its distinct dialect of the Hawaiian language, which still survives on Niʻihau. While the dominant dialect is based on that of Hawaiʻi island, which has no [t] sound, the Kauaʻi dialect had this sound. This happened because the Kauaʻi dialect had retained the old Polynesian /t/ sound, replaced in the "standard" Hawaiʻi dialect by [k]. This difference applies to all words with these sounds, so the Kauaian name for Kauaʻi was pronounced "Tauaʻi", and Kapaʻa was pronounced "Tapaʻa".

== History ==
=== Settlement ===
It is uncertain when humans discovered the Hawaiian islands. Early archaeological studies suggested that Polynesian explorers from the Marquesas Islands or Society Islands may have arrived as early as 600 AD, possibly with a second wave arriving from Tahiti around 1100 AD Later analyses suggest that the first settlers arrived around 900–1200 AD

=== Arrival of James Cook ===
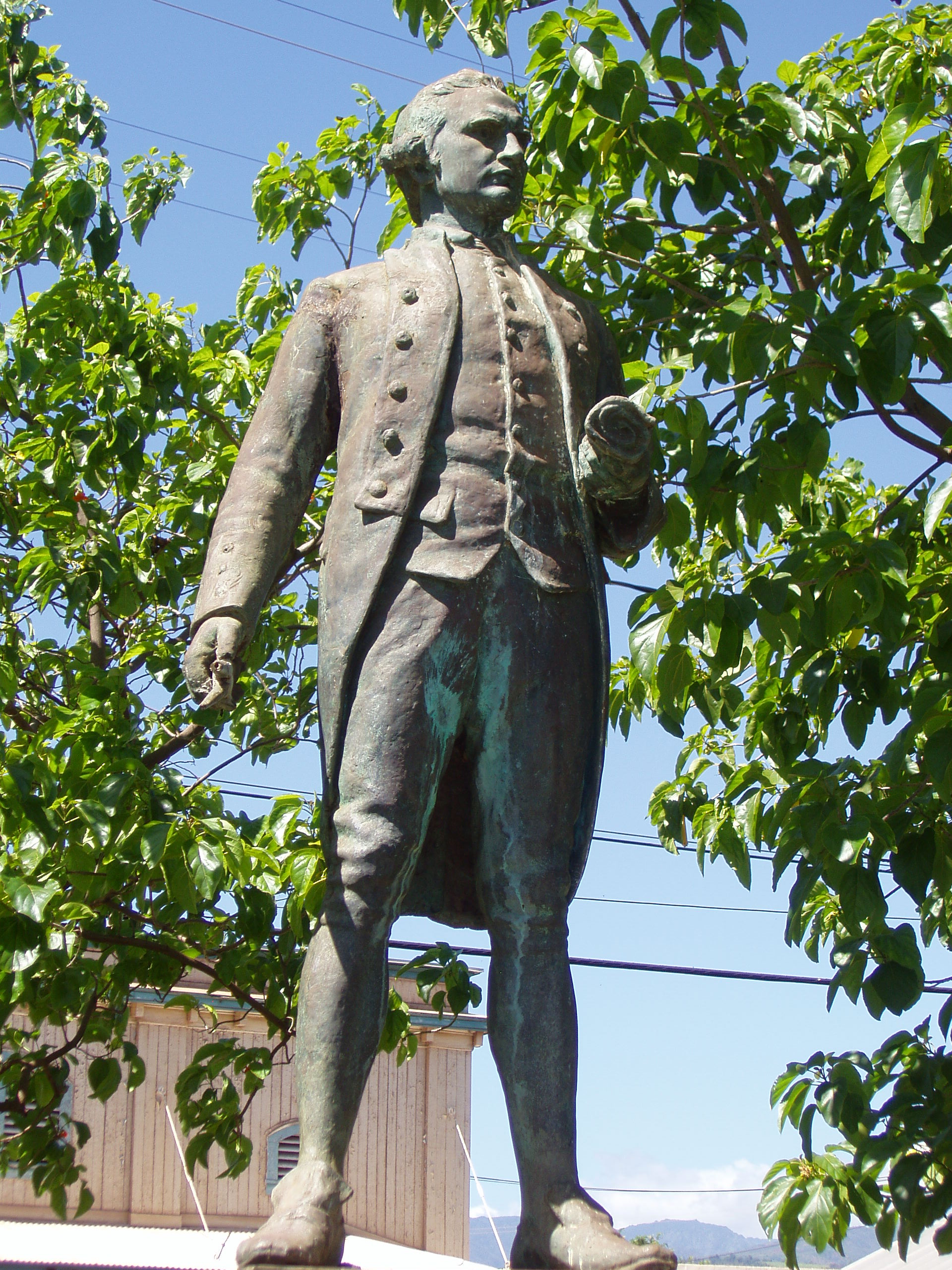
A statue of Captain James Cook commemorating his landing at Waimea, Kauaʻi, January 20, 1778

In January 1778, British navigator James Cook made the first recorded contact between any European and the indigenous people of the Hawaiian Islands when he arrived at Kauaʻi by accident while crossing the Pacific during his third voyage of exploration. The British immediately observed similarities in language and culture between the Kauaians and the parts of Polynesia with which they were already familiar, such as Tahiti. After some Kauaians were persuaded to board his ship, Cook later wrote:

I never saw [indigenous people] so astonished at entering a ship. Their eyes were continually flying from object to object, the wildness of their looks and actions fully expressed their surprise and astonishment.

Later, while investigating a location for the ships to anchor, a shore party was mobbed by a crowd, a shot was fired, and one Kauaian was killed. The next day, January 20, 1778, the two ships anchored in Waimea Bay on the southwest coast, where the expedition spent days obtaining fresh water and trading for fresh food. The local people especially valued iron: even small amounts, such as a single nail, could be traded for plentiful food supplies. Within two weeks, Cook left the vicinity of the Hawaiian Islands to continue his original mission.

=== Cession to the Kingdom of Hawaii ===
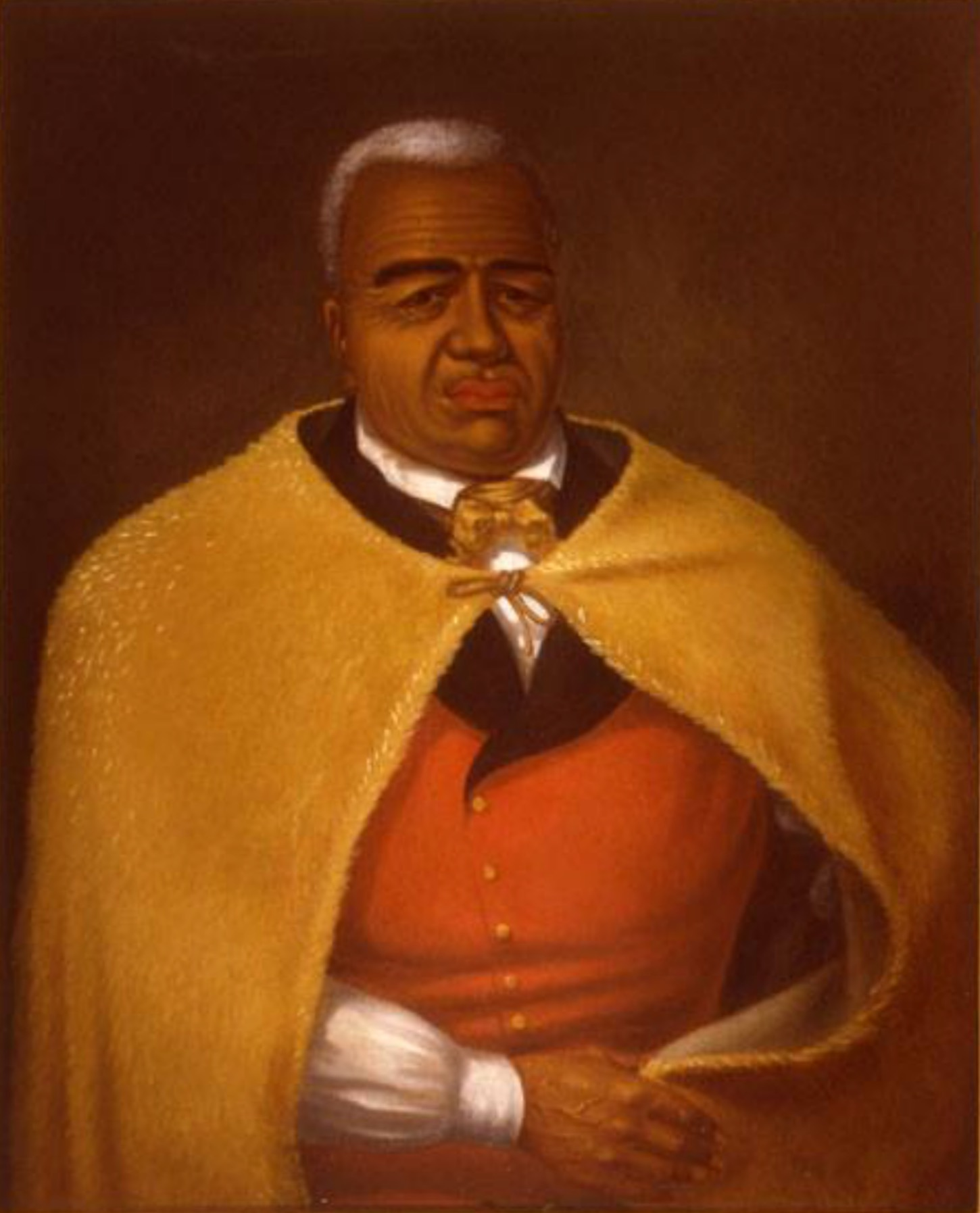
Kamehameha I, portrait by James Gay Sawkins, based on Louis Choris sketch

At the time of Cook's visit, the Hawaiian islands comprised several kingdoms. By 1795, the king of Hawaii Island, Kamehameha I, had established the Kingdom of Hawaii, uniting most of the islands, but Kauaʻi remained independent. Kamehameha tried to conquer Kauaʻi in 1796, but stormy seas caused the attack from Oahu to be canceled and he was afterward distracted by events elsewhere. By 1803, Kauaʻi was ruled by Kaumualiʻi, who maintained his independence from the Kingdom of Hawaii. A second invasion of Kauaʻi from Oahu was planned but this too was canceled after an epidemic broke out among Kamehameha's forces. In 1810, a diplomatic agreement was reached whereby Kaumualiʻi agreed to be Kamehameha's vassal, and to cede Kauaʻi to the Kingdom of Hawaiʻi upon his death by making Kamehameha's son his heir.

=== Schäffer affair ===
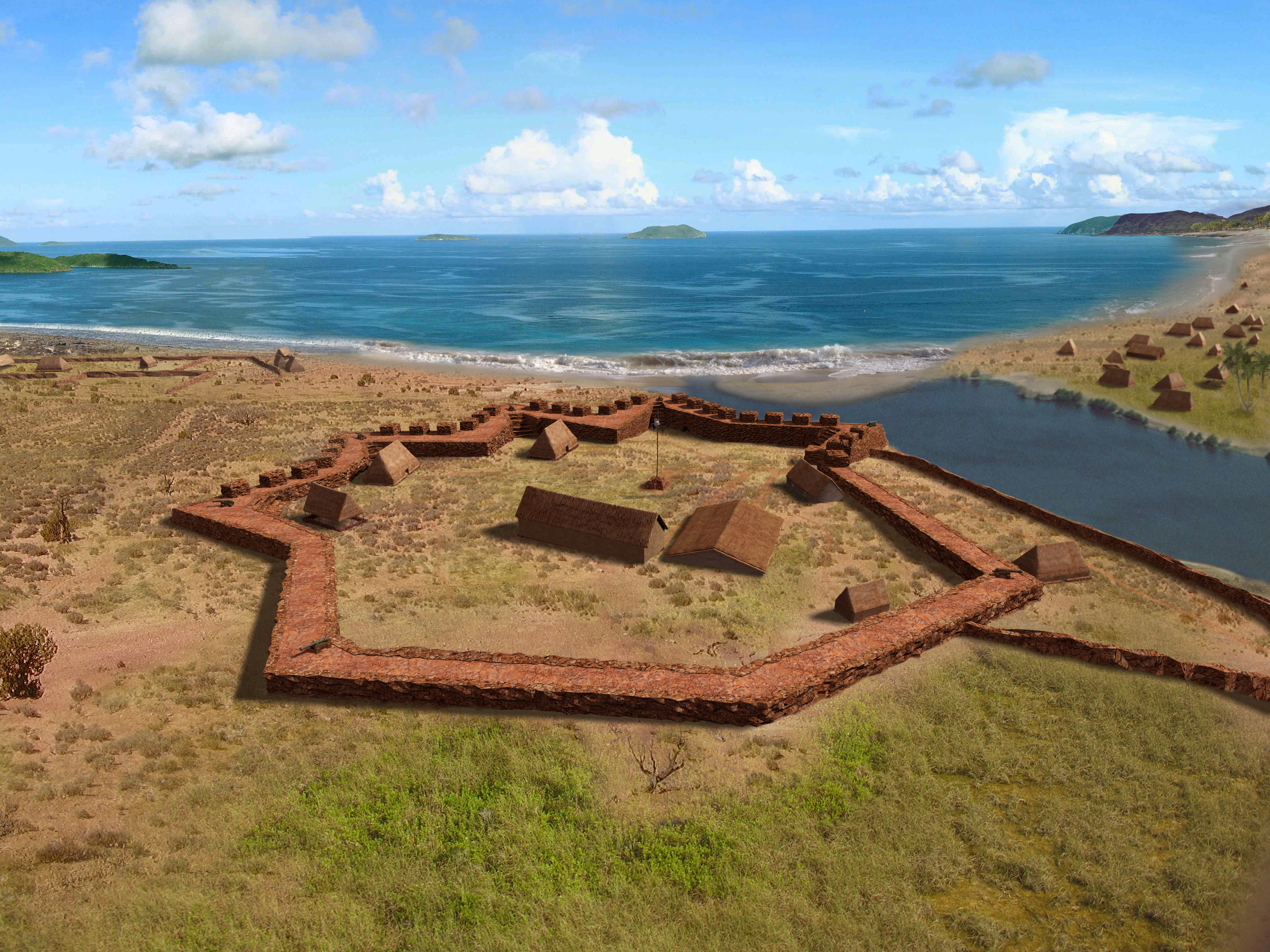
Artist's impression of Russian Fort Elizabeth overlooking Waimea Bay, Kauaʻi

The Schäffer affair was a diplomatic episode instigated in 1815 by Georg Anton Schäffer, a German working with the Russian-American Company. While at Kauaʻi in 1816, Schäffer involved Kaumualiʻi in "a treasonable design" whereby Kauaʻi would accept the protection of the Russian Empire in exchange for exclusive trading privileges. In 1817, a fort was built at Waimea and a Russian flag raised over it. But on Kamehameha's orders, and persuaded by other foreign traders, Kaumualiʻi abandoned his relationship with Schäffer and forced the Russians to leave Kauaʻi.

=== Plantations ===
From the 1830s till the mid-20th century, plantations of sugarcane were Kauaʻi's most important industry. In 1835, the first sugarcane plantation was founded on Kauaʻi, and for the next century the industry dominated Hawaiʻi's economy. Kauaʻi's last sugarcane plantation, the 118-year-old Gay & Robinson Plantation, stopped planting sugarcane in 2008.

=== Old Sugar Mill of Koloa ===
In 1835, Old Koloa Town opened a sugar mill. From 1906 to 1934 the office of County Clerk was held by John Mahiʻai Kāneakua, who had been active in attempts to restore Queen Liliʻuokalani to the throne after the U.S. takeover of Hawaiʻi in 1893.

=== Valdemar Knudsen ===
Valdemar Emil Knudsen was a Norwegian who arrived on Kauaʻi in 1857. Knudsen, or "Kanuka", originally managed Grove Farm in Koloa. He later sought a warmer land and purchased the leases to Mana and Kekaha, where he became a successful sugarcane plantation owner. He settled in Waiawa, between Mana and Kekaha, immediately across the channel from Niʻihau Island. His son, Eric Alfred Knudsen, was born in Waiawa.

Knudsen was appointed land administrator by King Kamehameha IV for an area covering 400 km^{2}, and was given the title konohiki as well as a position as a noble under the king. Knudsen, who spoke fluent Hawaiian, later became an elected representative and an influential politician.

Knudsen lends his name to the Knudsen Gap, a narrow pass between Hāʻupu Ridge and the Kahili Ridge. Its primary function was as a sugar farm.

=== Frank VanderSloot ===
The historic 105-acre Valley House home on Kauaʻi, where scenes from Jurassic Park and Pirates of the Caribbean were filmed, is owned by Frank VanderSloot, the wealthy creator of the health and wellness company Melaleuca. He runs the state's two biggest meat-processing facilities and is an advocate for localizing Hawaii's cattle sector. He has said, "The pineapple has vanished. There is no more sugarcane. Cattle are actually the only thing left at the moment".

=== Mark Zuckerberg ===
In 2014, Zuckerberg purchased 700 acres of land on the Hawaiian island of Kauaʻi. In January 2017, Zuckerberg filed eight "quiet title and partition" lawsuits against hundreds of native Hawaiians to claim small tracts of land that they owned within his acreage. Zuckerberg responded to criticisms in a Facebook post, stating that the lawsuits were a good faith effort to pay the partial owners of the land their "fair share". When he learned that Hawaiian land ownership law differs from that of the other 49 states, he dropped the lawsuits. Zuckerberg stated that he regretted not taking the time to understand the process and its history before moving ahead. Eventually, an auction helped sell the pockets of land.

Zuckerberg paid $17 million (equivalent to $20,198,330 in 2025) to add 110 acres to his contentious 1,500-acre estate in Kauai, in December 2021.

At least $145 million was spent by Zuckerberg on land in Kauai that he is developing into a massive 1,450-acre retreat that is partially gated off. In a January Instagram post, he uploaded a picture of a massive steak and joked that "of all my projects, this is the most delicious," indicating that he is rearing beer-fed Wagyu and Angus cattle on the property, involving his daughters in the process.

== Geography ==
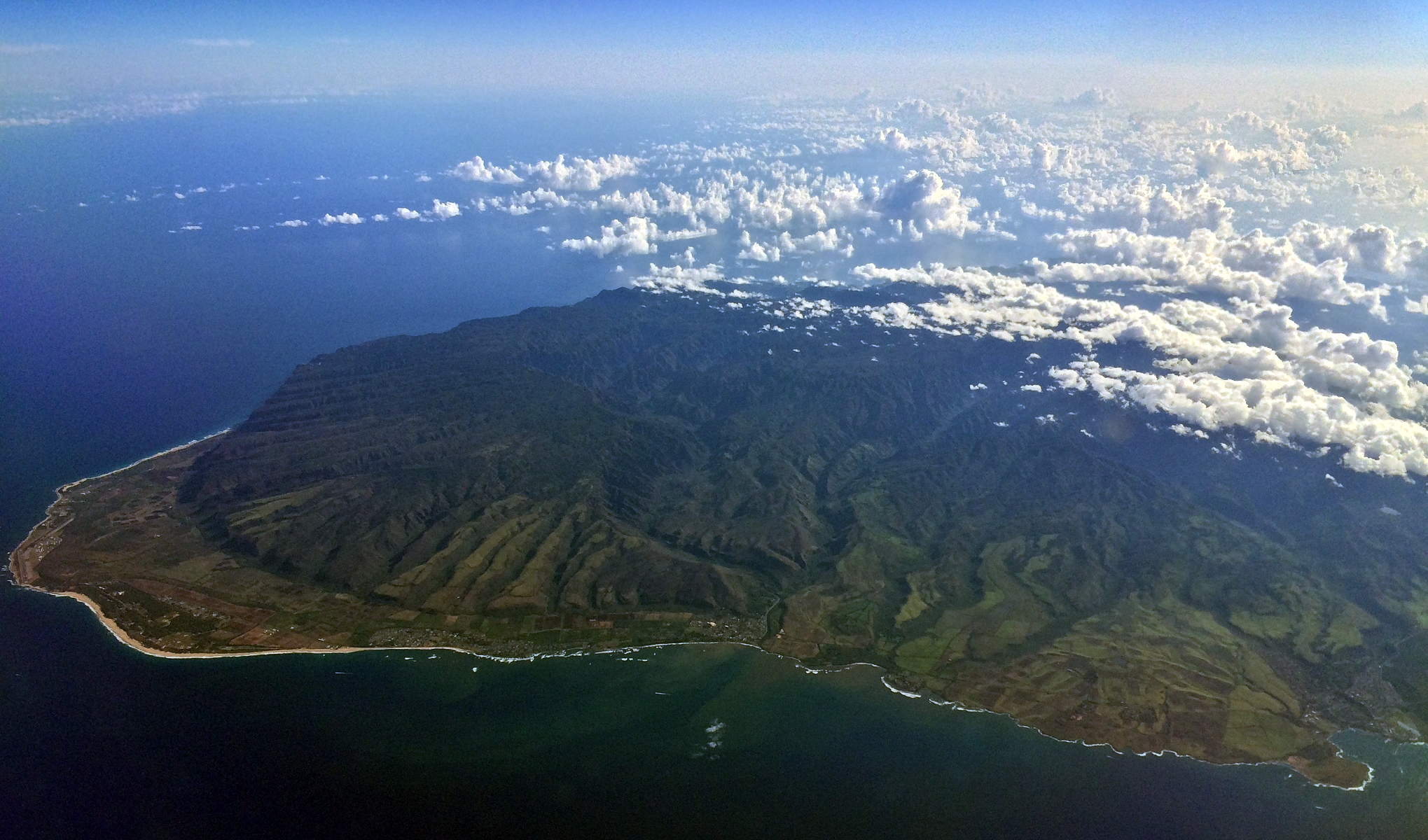
Aerial view of Kauaʻi

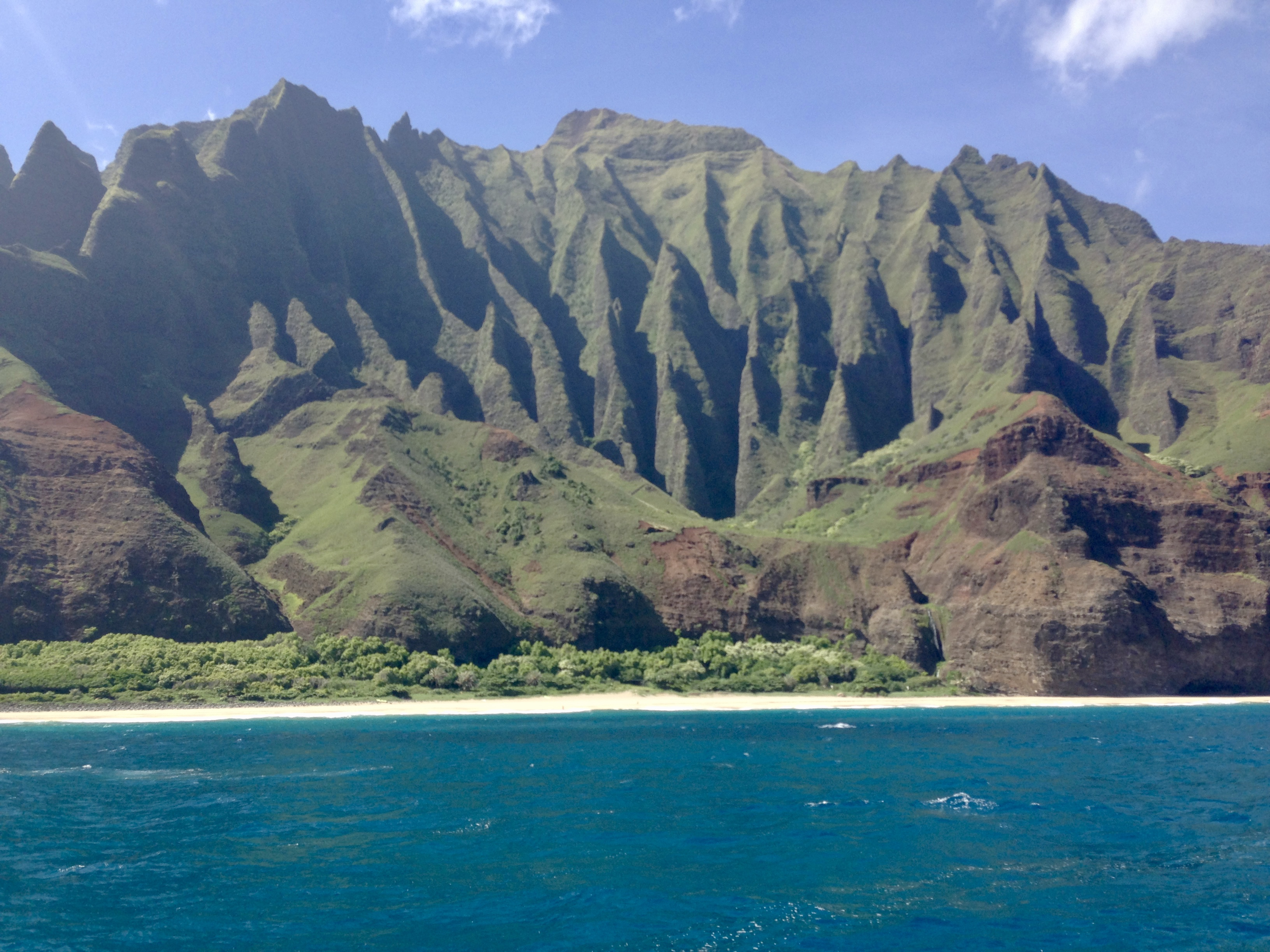
Nā Pali Coast State Park

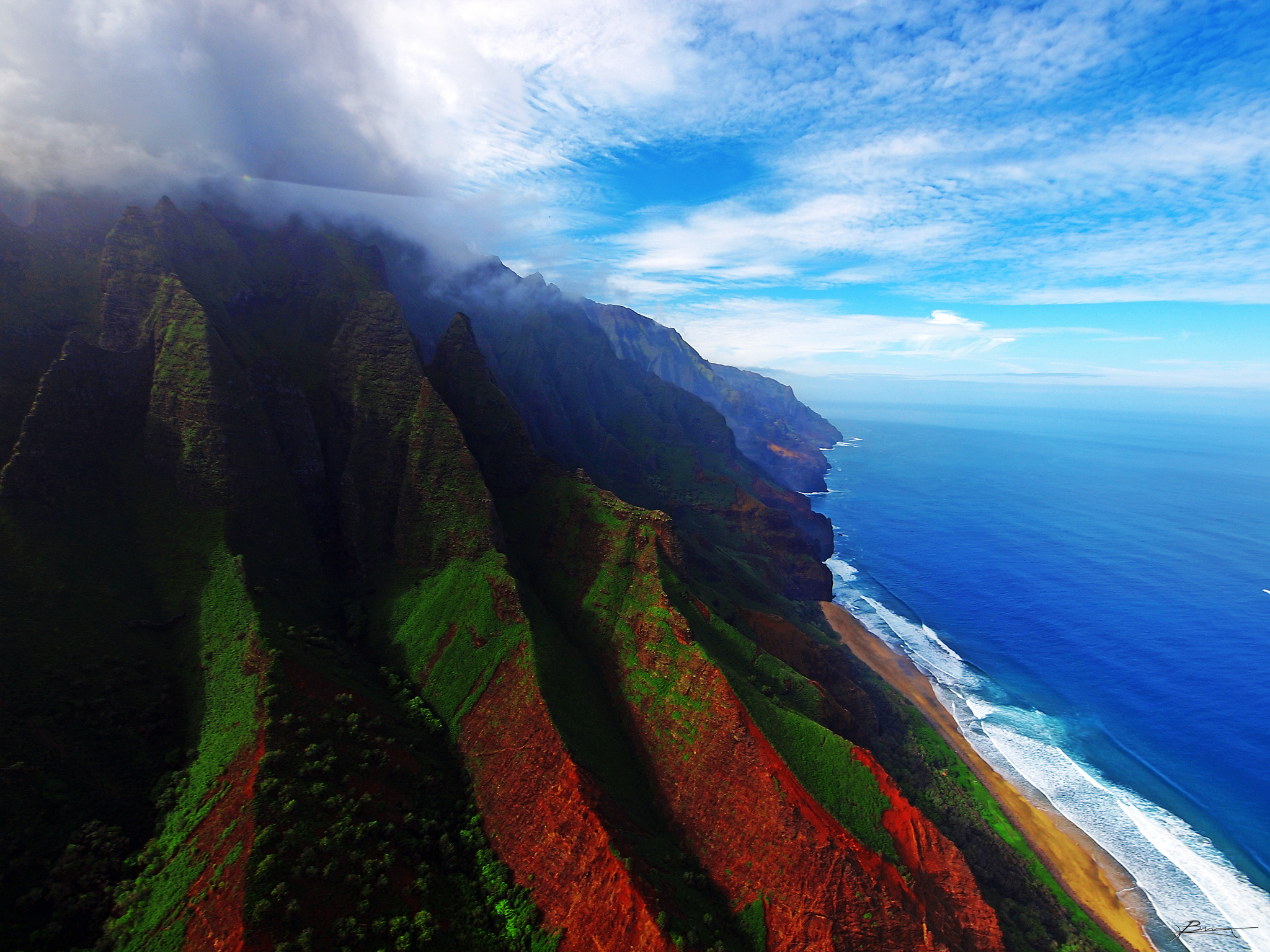
Kalalau Beach

The five-million-year-old island, the oldest of the main islands (Niʻihau is older), was formed volcanically as the Pacific Plate passed over the Hawaiʻi hotspot. It consists of an eroded shield volcano with a 9.3–12.4-mile-diameter-summit (15.0–20.0 km) caldera and two flanking calderas. Rejuvenation of the volcano 0.6–1.40 million years ago left lava flows and cones over the eastern two-thirds of the island.

Kauaʻi's highest peak is Kawaikini, at 5,243 ft (1,598 m). The second-highest is Mount Waiʻaleʻale, near the center of the island, 5,148 ft (1,569 m) above sea level. One of the wettest spots on earth, with an annual average rainfall of 460 in (38.3 ft; 11.7 m), is on the east side of Mount Waiʻaleʻale. The rain has eroded deep valleys in the central mountains, carving out canyons with many scenic waterfalls. On the west side of the island, Waimea town is at the mouth of the Waimea River, whose flow formed Waimea Canyon, one of the world's most scenic canyons, which is part of Waimea Canyon State Park. At three thousand ft (910 m) deep, Waimea Canyon is often called "The Grand Canyon of the Pacific". Kokeo Point lies on the island's south side. The Nā Pali Coast is an isolated center for recreation, including kayaking along the beaches and hiking on the trail along the coastal cliffs. The headlands Kamala Point, Kawai Point, Kawelikoa Point, Kuahonu Point, Paoʻa Point, and Molehu Point are on the southeast of the island; Makaokahaʻi Point and Weli Point are in the south.

=== Climate ===
Kauaʻi

Climate chart (precipitation, max. and min. temperature)
J	F	M	A	M	J	J	A	S	O	N	D
31 22 16	110 22 14	99 24 15	34 24 15	37 24 17	4 25 18	11 26 18	27 25 18	15 24 19	35 24 18	27 23 18	107 21 17
- █ Average max. and min. temperatures in °C
- █ Precipitation totals in mm
Imperial conversion
J	F	M	A	M	J	J	A	S	O	N	D
1.2 72 61	4.3 72 57	3.9 75 59	1.3 75 59	1.5 75 63	0.2 77 64	0.4 79 64	1.1 77 64	0.6 75 66	1.4 75 64	1.1 73 64	4.2 70 63
- █ Average max. and min. temperatures in °F
- █ Precipitation totals in inches

Kauaʻi's climate is tropical, with generally humid and stable conditions year-round, although infrequent storms cause severe flooding. At the lower elevations, the annual precipitation varies from an average of about 50 in (130 cm) on the windward (northeastern) shore to less than 20 in (51 cm) on the (southwestern) leeward side of the island. The average temperature in Līhuʻe, the county seat, ranges from 78 °F (26 °C) in February to 85 °F (29 °C) in August and September.

Kauaʻi's mountainous regions offer cooler temperatures in contrast to the warm coastal areas. At Kōkeʻe State Park, 3,200–4,200 ft (980–1,280 m) ASL, day temperatures vary from an average of 45 °F (7 °C) in January to 68 °F (20 °C) in July. In the winter, temperatures have been known to drop down to the 30s and 40s at the park, which holds an unofficial record low of 29 °F (−2 °C), recorded in February 1986 at Kanaloahuluhulu Meadow.

Precipitation in Kauaʻi's mountainous regions averages 50–100 in (1,300–2,500 mm) annually. About ten mi (16 km) southeast of Kōkeʻe state park, at an elevation of 5,075 ft (1,547 m), is the Mt. Waiʻaleʻale rain gauge. Mt. Waiʻaleʻale is often cited as the wettest spot on earth, although this has been disputed. Based on data for the period from 1931 through 1960, the average yearly precipitation was 460 in (11,700 mm) (U.S. Environmental Science Services Administration, 1968). Between 1949 and 2004, the average yearly precipitation at Mt. Waiʻaleʻale was 374 in (9,500 mm).

Kauaʻi also holds a record in hourly precipitation. During a storm on January 24–25, 1956, a rain gauge at Kauaʻi's former Kilauea Sugar Plantation recorded a record twelve in (305 mm) of precipitation in just 60 minutes. The value for one hour is an underestimate, since the rain gauge overflowed, which may have resulted in an error by as much as 1 in (25 mm). An accurate measurement may have exceeded Holt, Missouri's world-record rainfall of 12 in (300 mm) in 42 minutes on June 22, 1947.

=== Time zone ===
Hawaii Standard Time (UTC−10:00) is observed on Kauaʻi year-round. When mainland states are on daylight saving time, for example, the time on Kauaʻi is three hours behind the West Coast of the United States and six hours behind the East Coast.

=== River system ===
- Waimea River 35.7 km (22.2 mi)
- Hanalei River 26.5 km (16.5 mi)
- Hanapēpē River 24.2 km (15.0 mi)
- Wainiha River 24 km (15 mi)
- Wailuā River 23.4 km (14.5 mi)
- Makaweli River 23.2 km (14.4 mi)
- Hulāʻia River a.k.a. Hulēʻia River 21.4 km (13.3 mi)
- Kalihi Wai River 20 km (12 mi)
- Anahola River 19.4 km (12.1 mi)
- Lumahaʻi River 16 km (9.9 mi)
- Kōʻula River 14.8 km (9.2 mi)
- Olokele River 14.4 km (8.9 mi)
- Kīlauea Stream 13.4 km (8.3 mi)
- Waikomo Stream 9.8 km (6.1 mi)

=== Waterfalls ===
- Hāliʻi Falls
- Hanakāpīʻai Falls
- Hinalele Falls
- Kalihi Wai Falls
- Kīlauea Falls
- Mānāwaiopuna Falls
- ʻŌpaekaʻa Falls
- Wailua Falls
- Waipoʻo Falls
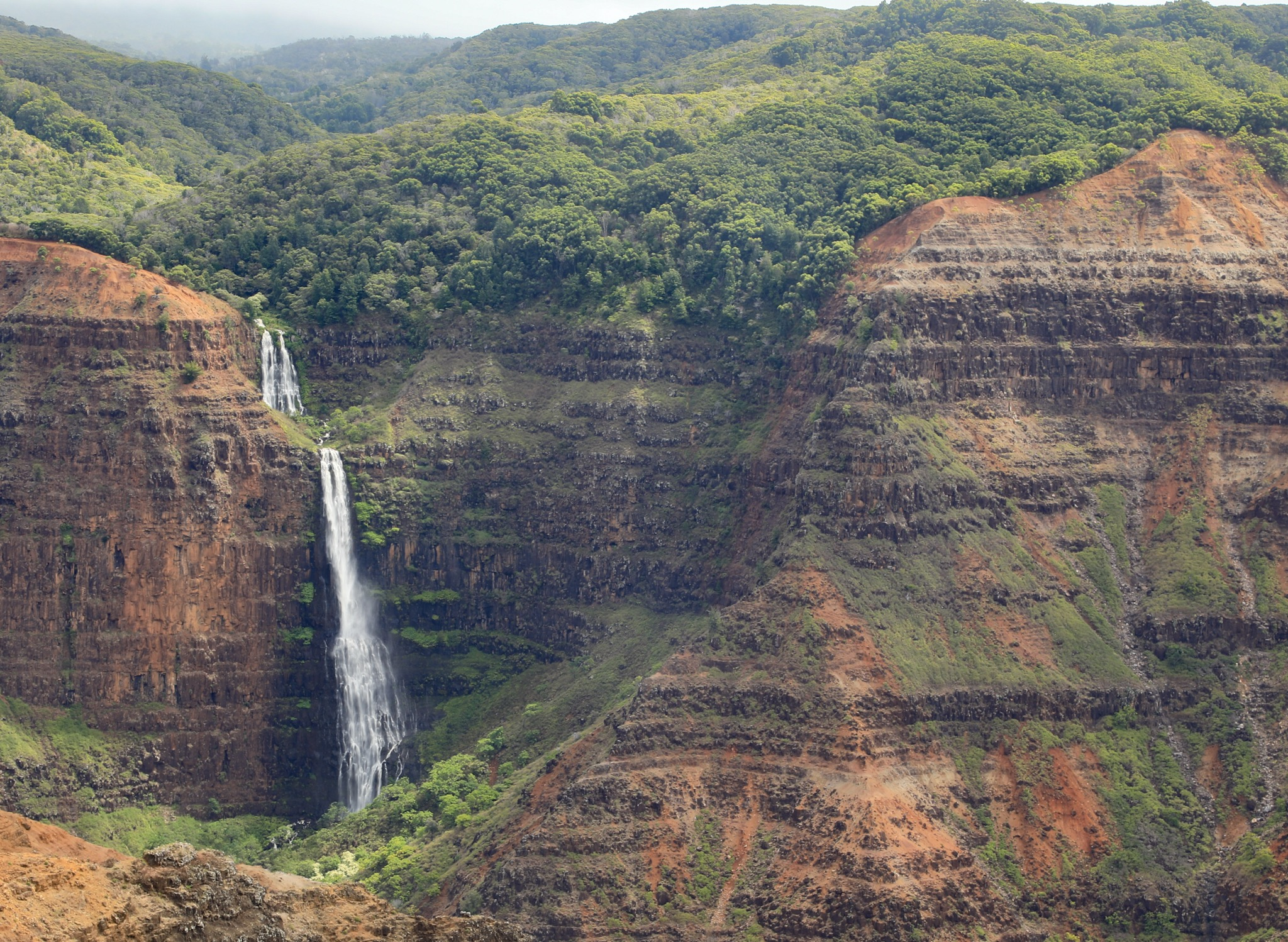
Waipoʻo Falls at Waimea Canyon State Park

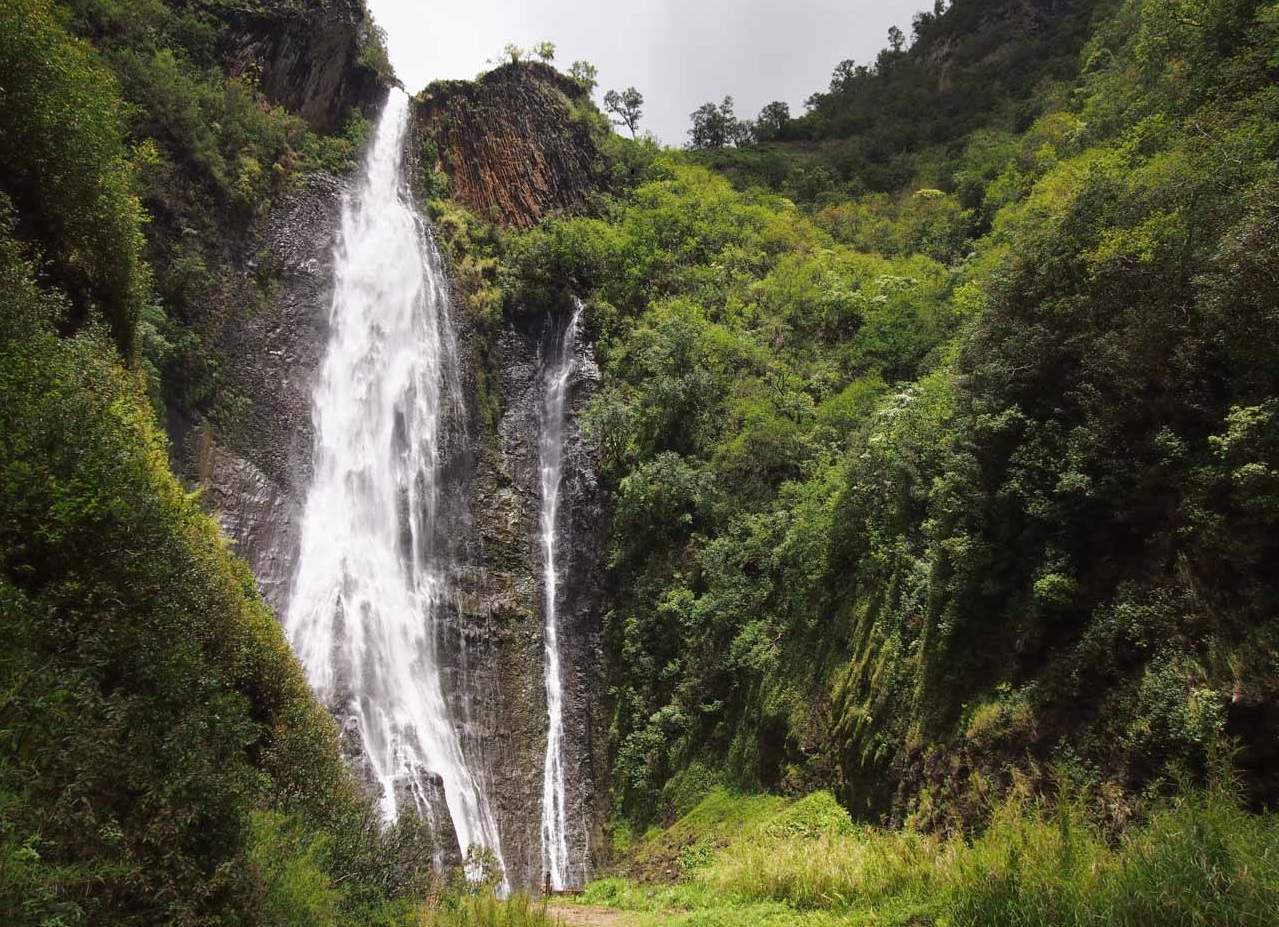
Mānāwaiopuna Falls

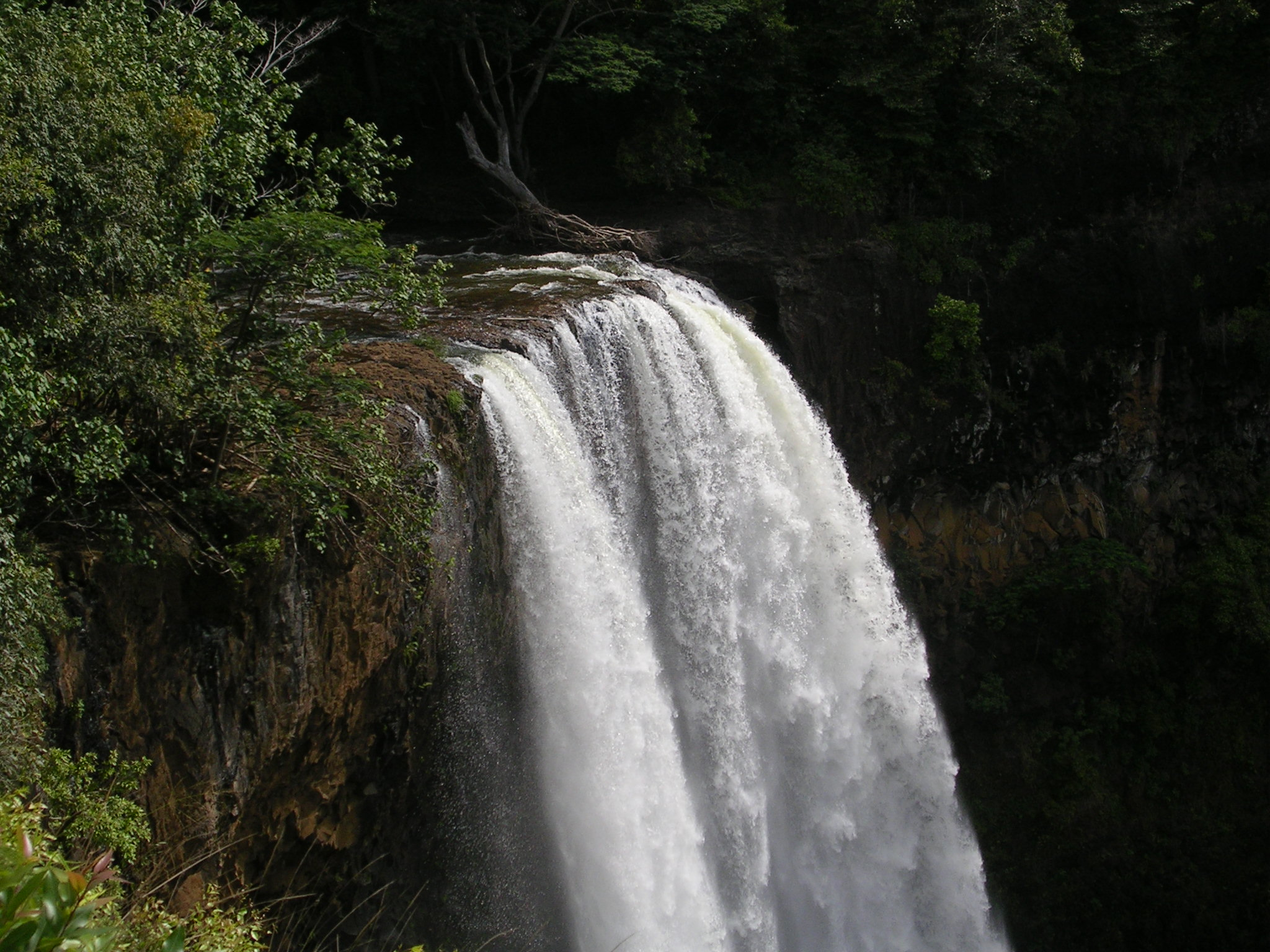
Wailua Falls

== Economy ==
Tourism is Kauaʻi's largest industry. In 2007, 1,271,000 people visited. The two largest groups were from the continental United States (84% of all visitors) and Japan (3%). As of 2003, approximately 27,000 jobs existed on Kauaʻi. The largest sector was accommodation/food services (26%, 6,800 jobs), followed by government (15%) and retail (14.5%), with agriculture accounting for 2.9% (780 jobs) and educational services providing 0.7% (183 jobs). The visitors' industry accounted for one third of Kauaʻi's income. Employment is dominated by small businesses, with 87% of all non-farm businesses having fewer than 20 employees. As of 2003, Kauaʻi's poverty rate was 10.5%, compared to the mainland at 10.7%.

As of 2014, the median home price was about $400,000.

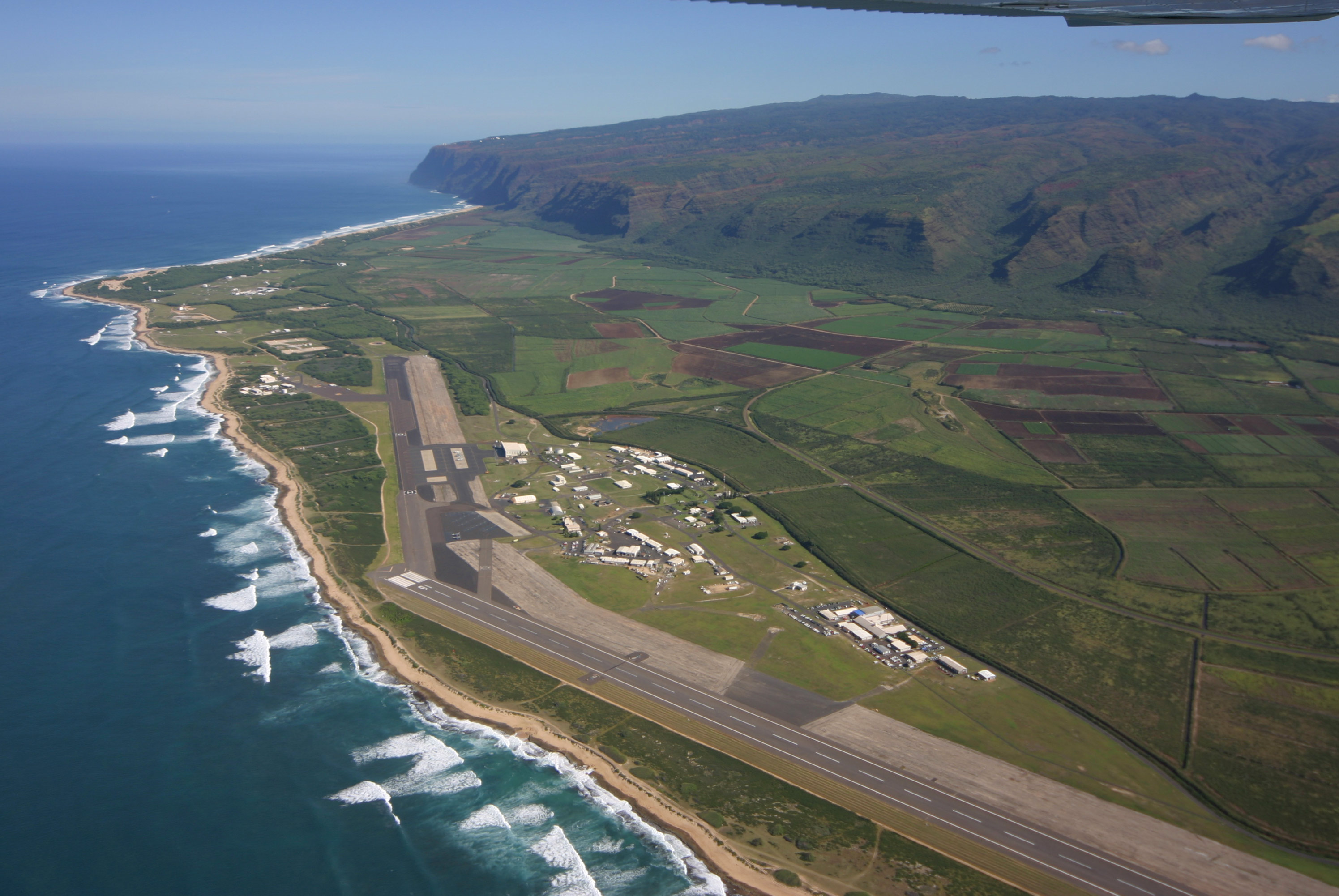
Pacific Missile Range Facility northwest of Kekaha, Kauaʻi

Land in Kauaʻi is very fertile; farmers raise many varieties of fruit and other crops. Guava, coffee, sugarcane, mango, banana, papaya, avocado, star fruit, kava, noni and pineapple are all cultivated on the island, but most agricultural land is used for raising cattle.

Kauaʻi is home to the U.S. Navy's "Barking Sands" Pacific Missile Range Facility, on the western shore.

MF and HF ("shortwave") radio station WWVH, sister station to WWV and low frequency WWVB in Fort Collins, Colorado, is on the west coast of Kauaʻi, about 3 mi (5 km) south of Barking Sands. WWVH, WWV and WWVB are operated by the U.S. National Institute of Standards and Technology, broadcasting standard time and frequency information to the public.

== Energy ==
Kauaʻi Island Utility Cooperative was formed in November 2002. KIUC operates as a not-for-profit organization that is owned by its members and governed by an elected board of directors. It serves 39,978 meters (electric accounts). Of those, it has 29,000 residential member-owners and 4,000 commercial member-owners. KIUC serves 550 square miles with 1,530 transmission and distribution lines. Its generating capacity is 259.2 megawatts. In 2023, KIUC reported that 57.8% of its electricity came from renewable energy sources. In 2023, the fuel mix by source was 42.1% fossil fuel, 24.7% utility solar, 13.4% customer solar, and 7.8% biomass. KIUC is headquartered in Līhuʻe.

In the 1970s, Kauaʻi burned sugarcane waste to supply most of its electricity.

By 2008, transition of energy sources and growth in generating capacity had occurred, with most of Kauaʻi's electricity produced by imported liquid petroleum. In 2006 and 2007, the inputs cost $69.3 million and $83 million, respectively. By 2011, 92% of KIUC's power came from diesel.

By 2017, KIUC's fuel mix was 56% fossil fuels, 9% hydroelectric, 12% biomass and 23% solar. KIUC integrated large-scale solar into its grid so that, during sunny daylight hours, 97% or more of its generation came from renewable sources. KIUC offers $1,000 rebates to residential customers who have solar water heating systems installed on their homes.

In 2017, KIUC opened a Tesla Energy 13 MW / 52 MWh battery next to the 12 MW Kapaia solar plant for 13.9¢/kWh. In December 2018, KIUC opened an AES Distributed Energy project for 20 MW solar with 20 MW / 100 MWh batteries priced at 11.1¢/kWh.

== Towns and communities ==
Līhuʻe, on the island's southeastern coast, is the seat of Kauaʻi County and the island's second-largest town. Kapaʻa, on the "Coconut Coast" (site of an old coconut plantation) about 6 mi (9.7 km) north of Līhuʻe, has a population of over 10,000, or about 50% greater than Līhuʻe. Princeville, on the island's north side, was once the capital of Kauaʻi.

Communities on Kauaʻi range in population from the roughly 10,000 people in Kapaʻa to tiny hamlets. Below are the larger or more notable of those from the northernmost end of Hawaii Route 560 to the western terminus of Hawaii Route 50:

Kauaʻi towns and villages by population
Name	population
Hāʻena State Park	550
Wainiha	419
Hanalei	450
Princeville	2,158
Kalihi Wai	428
Kīlauea	3,014
Anahola	2,311
Kapaʻa	11,652
Wailua	2,359
Hanamāʻulu	4,994
Līhuʻe	8,004
Wailua Homesteads	5,863
Puhi	3,380
Poʻipū	1,299
Kōloa	2,231
Lāwaʻi	2,578
Kalāheo	4,996
ʻEleʻele	2,515
Hanapēpē	2,678
Kaumakani	749
Waimea	2,057
Kekaha	3,715
Pākalā	294
Keālia	103

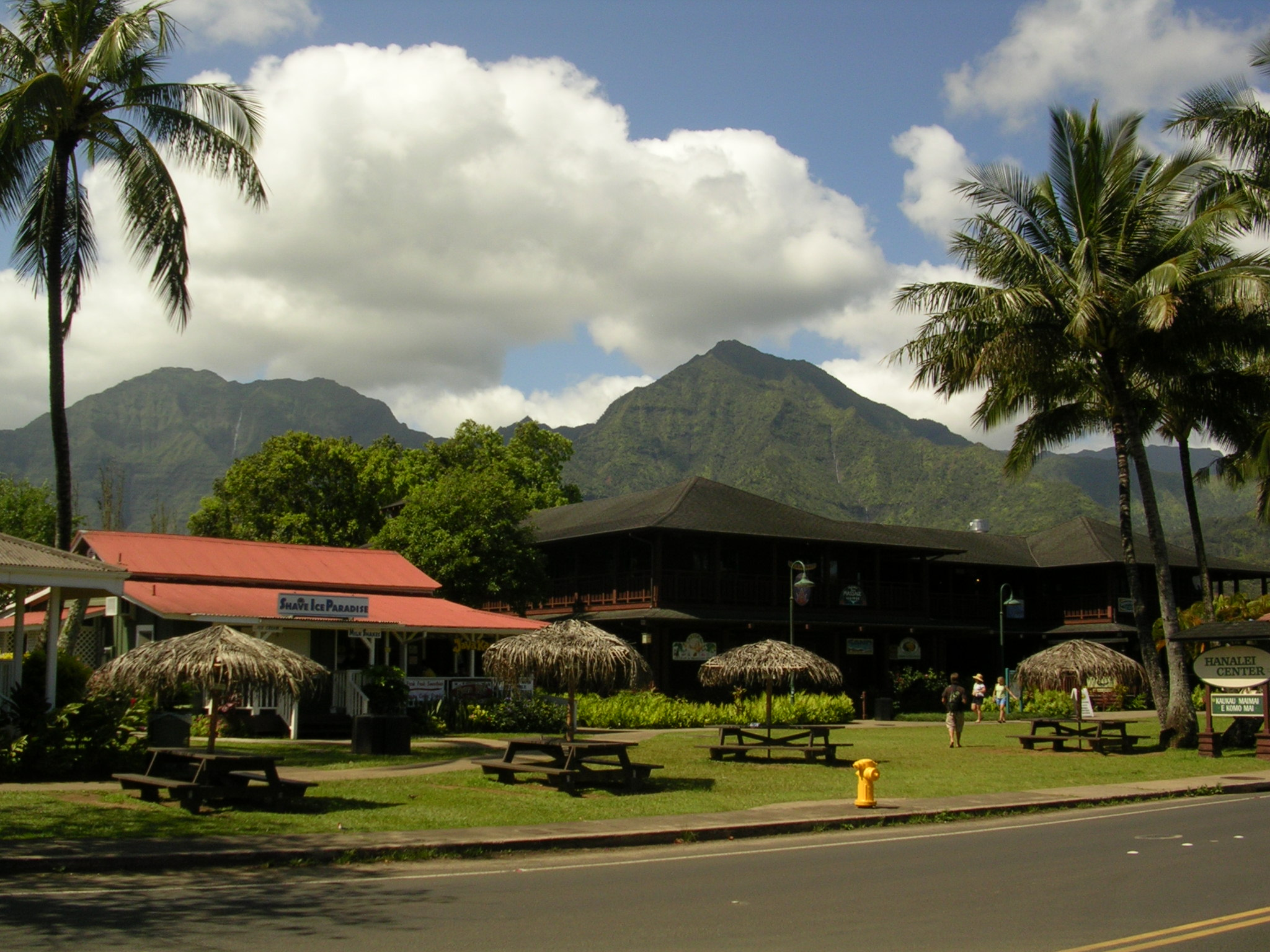
Hanalei town with a view of Mt. Na Molokama, and Māmalahoa

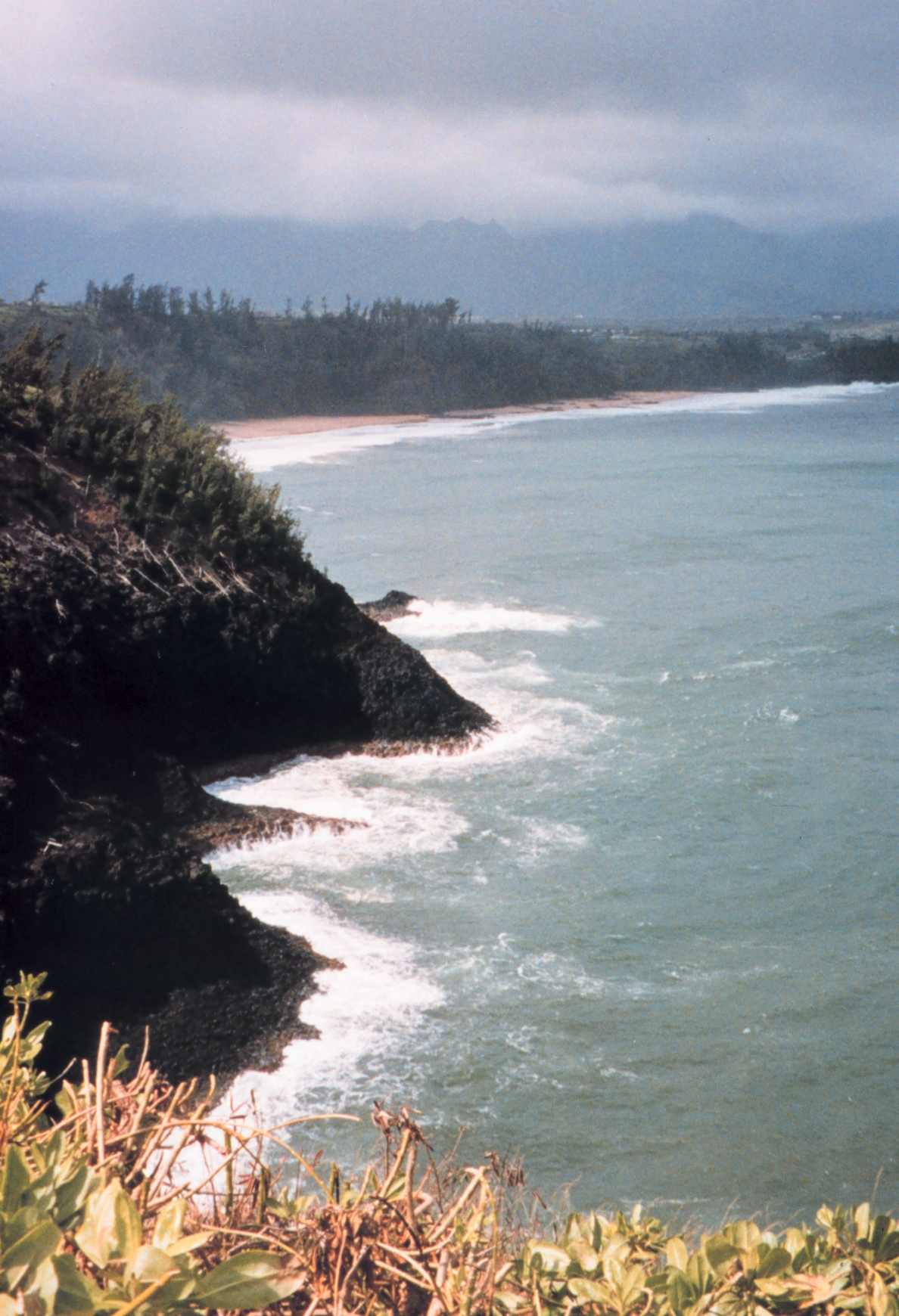
Northeastern coast of Kauaʻi, near Kīlauea

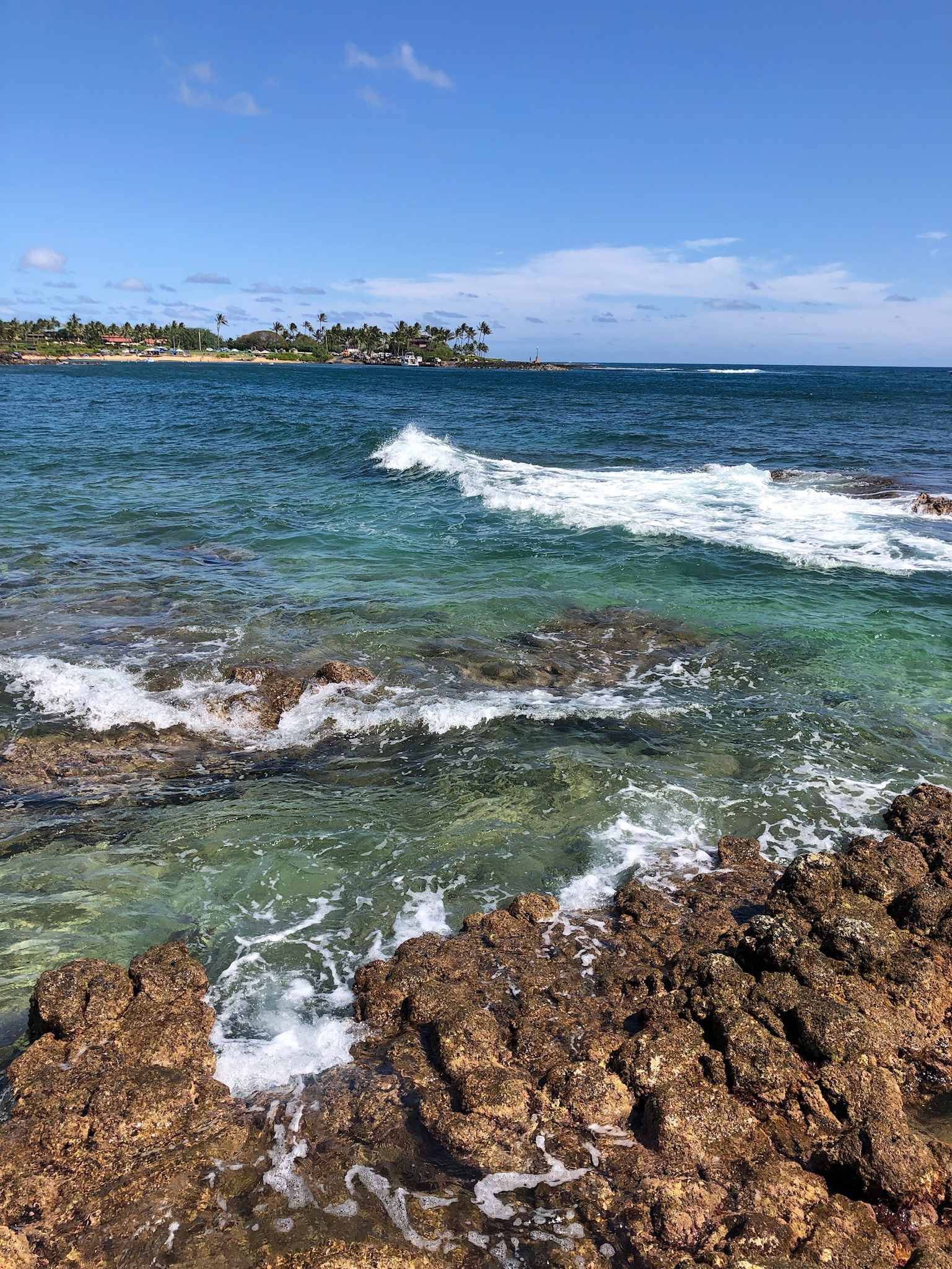
View of the Pacific Ocean, from the island's south shore

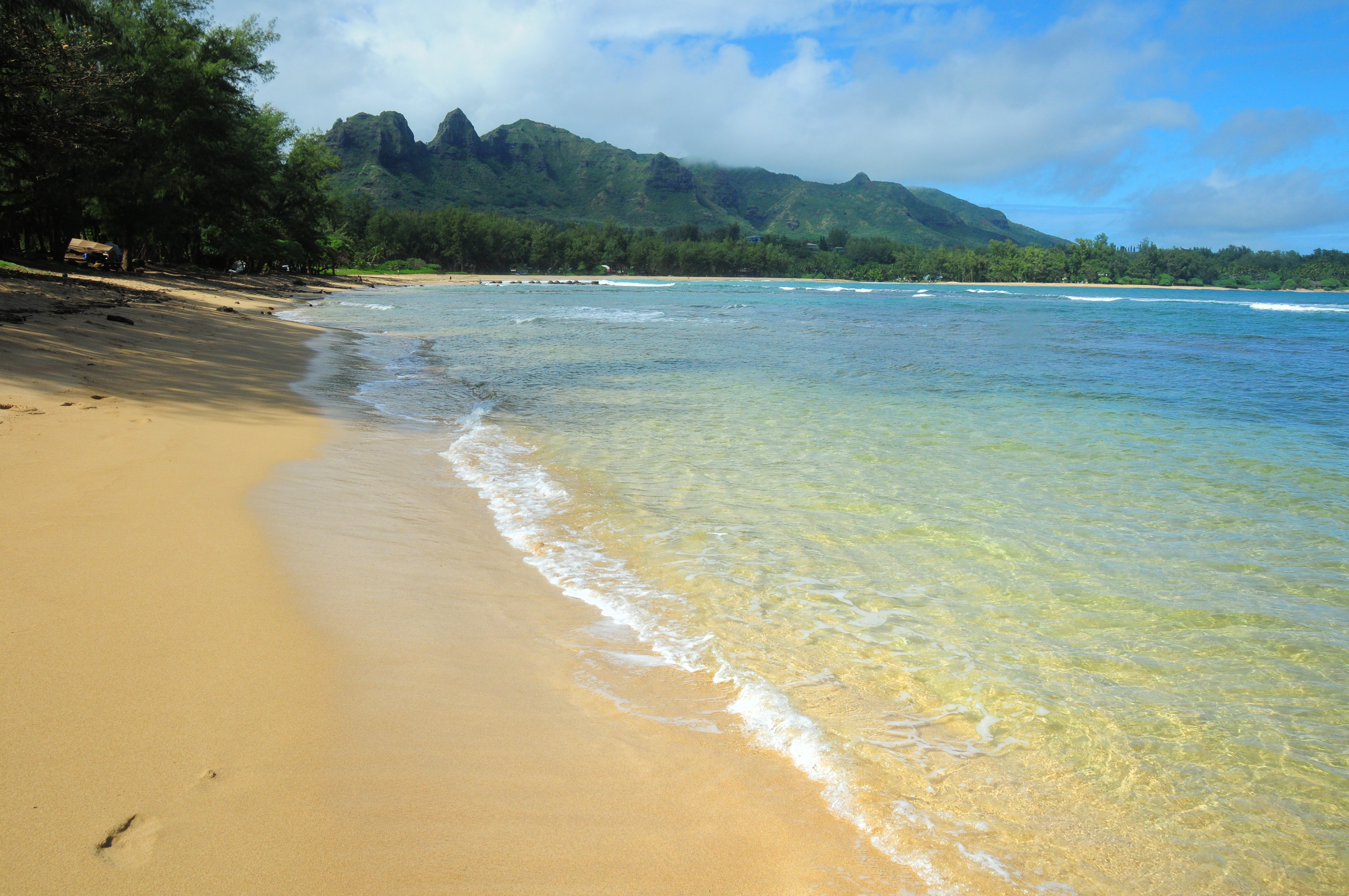
Anahola Bay is a snorkeling and swimming beach with clear pools and a long coral reef.

== Transport ==
=== Air ===
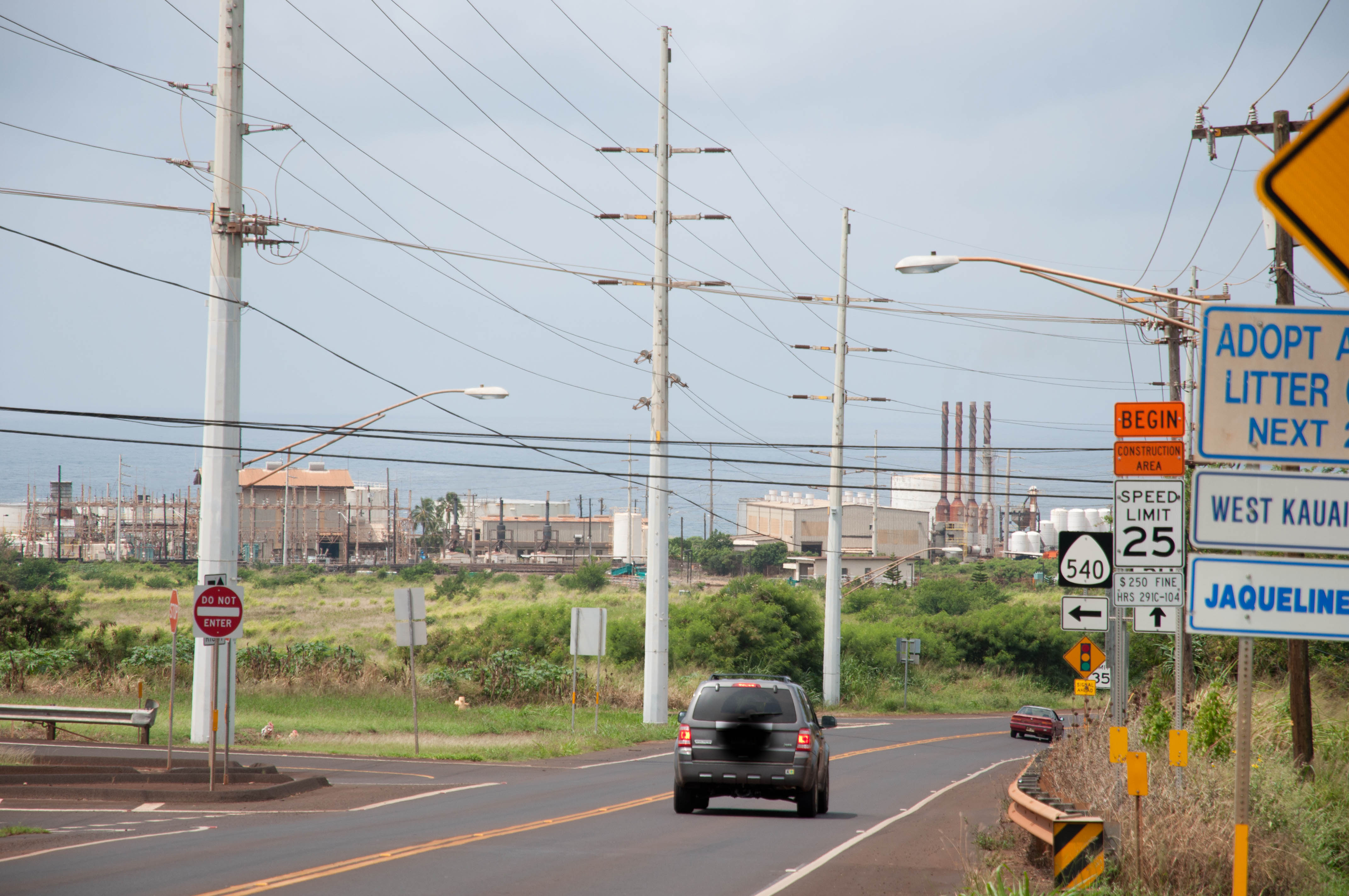
The commercial area in Port Allen

Located on the southeastern side of the island, Lihue Airport is the island's only commercial airport. It has direct routes to Honolulu, Kahului/Maui, Kona/Hawaii, the U.S. mainland, and Vancouver, Canada. General aviation airports on the island are Port Allen Airport and Princeville Airport.

The Pacific Missile Range Facility has a 6,006-foot runway that is closed to general aviation traffic, but could be used for an emergency landing.

=== Cruise ships ===
Some Princess Cruises and Norwegian Cruise Line ships stop in Nawiliwili Harbor, Līhuʻe.

=== Highways ===
Several state highways serve Kauaʻi County:

- Hawaii Route 50, also known as Kaumualiʻi Highway, is a thirty-three mile road that stretches from Hawaii Route 56 at the junction of Rice Street in Līhuʻe to a point approximately 1/5 mile north of the northernmost entrance of the Pacific Missile Range Facility on the far western shore.
- Hawaii Route 58 stretches 2 mi (3.2 km) from Route 50 in Līhuʻe to the junction of Wapaa Road with Hawaii 51 near Nawiliwili Harbor on Kauaʻi.
- Hawaii Route 56, also known as Kuhio Highway, runs 28 mi (45 km) from Hawaii Route 50 at the junction of Rice Street in Līhuʻe to the junction of Hawaiʻi Route 560 in Princeville.
- Hawaii Route 560 passes 10 mi (16 km) from the junction of Route 56 in Princeville and dead ends at Keʻe Beach in Haʻena State Park.

Other major highways that link other parts of the Island to the main highways of Kauaʻi are:

- Hawaii Route 55 covers 7.6 mi (12.2 km) from the junction of Route 50 in Kekaha to meet with Hawaii Route 550 south of Kokeʻe State Park in the Waimea Canyon.
- Hawaii Route 550 spans 15 mi (24 km) from Route 50 in Waimea to Kōkeʻe State Park.
- Hawaii Route 540 goes 4 mi (6.4 km) from Route 50 in Kalaheo to Route 50 in Eleʻele. The road is mainly an access to residential areas and Kauaʻi Coffee. It also functions as a bypass between Kalaheo and ʻEleʻele.
- Hawaii Route 530, also called Kōloa Road, stretches 3.4 mi (5.5 km) from Route 50 between Kalaheo and Lawai to Route 520 in Koloa. The road is mainly an alternative to Route 520 for travel from the west side to Poʻipū.
- Hawaii Route 520 runs 5 mi (8.0 km) from the "Tunnel of Trees" at Route 50 to Poʻipū on the south shore.
- Hawaii Route 570 covers 1 mi (1.6 km) from Route 56 in Līhuʻe to Līhuʻe Airport.
- Hawaii Route 580 spans 5 mi (8.0 km) from Route 56 in Wailua to where the road is no longer serviced just south of the Wailua Reservoir.
- Hawaii Route 581 passes 5 mi (8.0 km) from Route 580 in the Wailua Homesteads to a roundabout just west of Kapaʻa Town.
- Hawaii Route 583, also known as Maalo Road, stretches 3.9 mi (6.3 km) from Route 56 just north of Līhuʻe to dead-end at Wailua Falls Overlook in the interior.

=== Hawaii Scenic Byway ===
- Holo Holo Koloa Scenic Byway, this state designated scenic byway runs over 19 mi (31 km) and connects many of Kauaʻi's most historical and cultural sights such as the Maluhia Road (Tree Tunnel), Puhi (Spouting Horn), The National Tropical Botanical Gardens, and the Salt Beds.

=== Mass transit ===
The Kauaʻi Bus is the public transportation service of the County of Kauaʻi.

== Places of interest ==
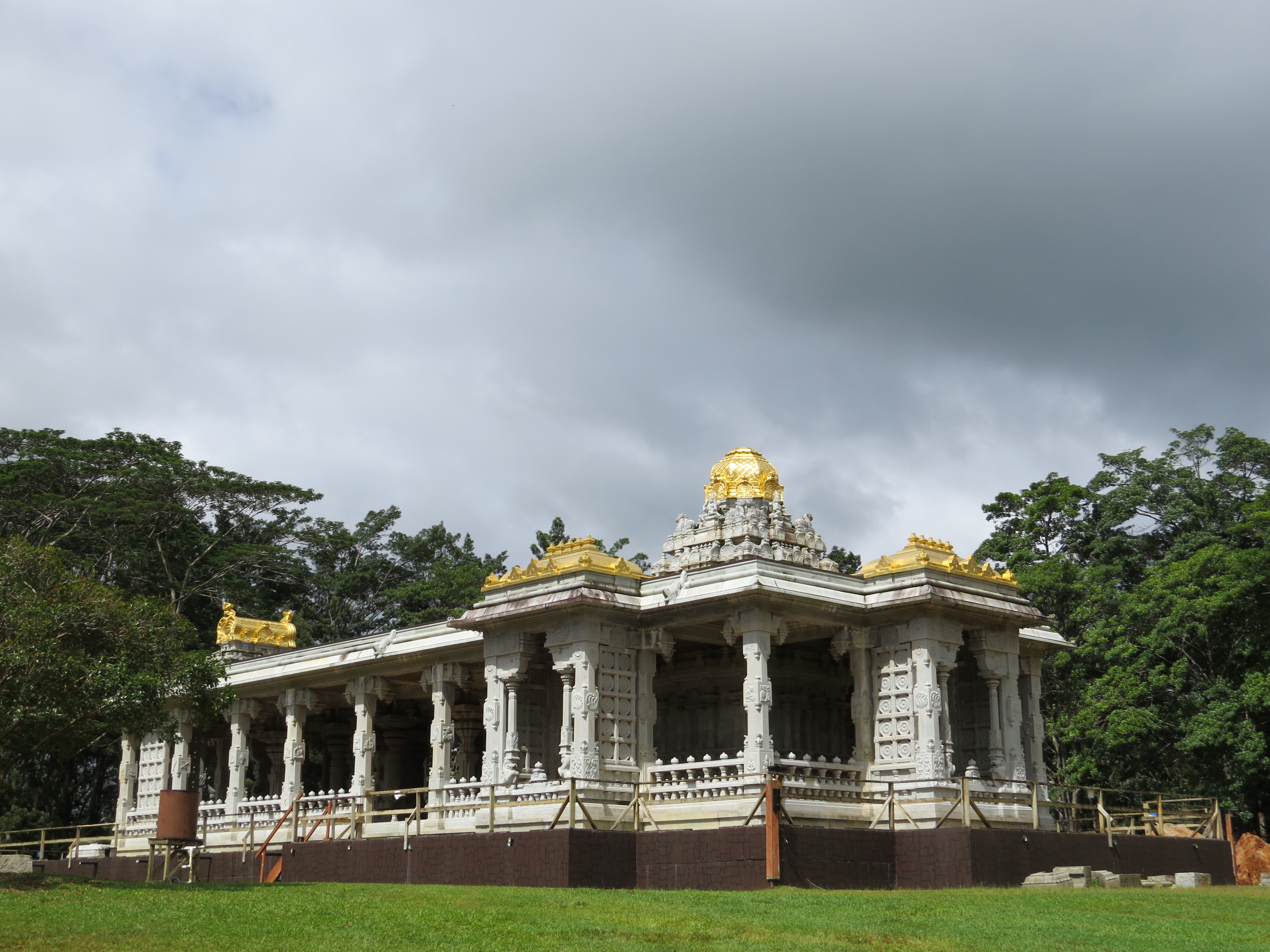
Kauaʻi Hindu monastery

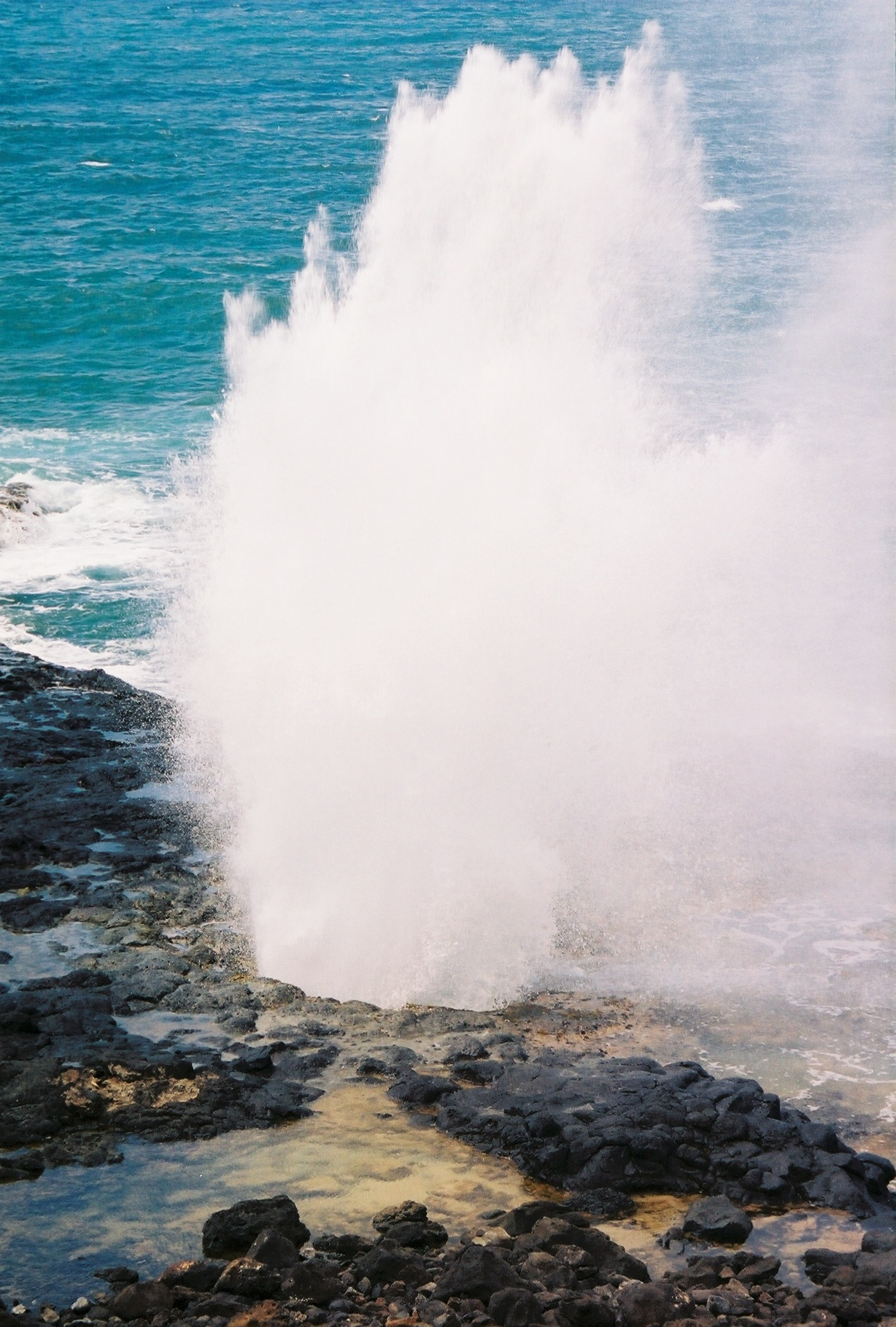
The Spouting Horn: located on the southern coast of Kauaʻi

The Kauaʻi Heritage Center of Hawaiʻian Culture and the Arts was founded in 1998. Its mission is to nurture appreciation and respect for Hawaiian culture. It offers classes in Hawaiian language, hula, lei and cordage making, the lunar calendar, chanting, and trips to cultural sites.

- Alakaʻi Wilderness Area
- Allerton Garden
- Camp Naue YMCA
- Fern Grotto
- Hāʻena State Park
- Hanalei Bay
- Hoʻopiʻi Falls
- Honopū Valley
- Kōkeʻe State Park
- Limahuli Garden and Preserve
- Makaleha Mountains
- Makauwahi Cave Reserve
- McBryde Garden
- Moir Gardens
- Moloaʻa Bay
- Na ʻĀina Kai Botanical Gardens
- Nā Pali Coast State Park
- ʻŌpaekaʻa Falls
- Paoʻa Point
- Poʻipū Beach Park
- Polihale State Park
- Queen's Bath
- Sleeping Giant (Nounou Mountain)
- Spouting Horn
- Wailuā River
- Waimea Canyon State Park

=== Panorama gallery ===
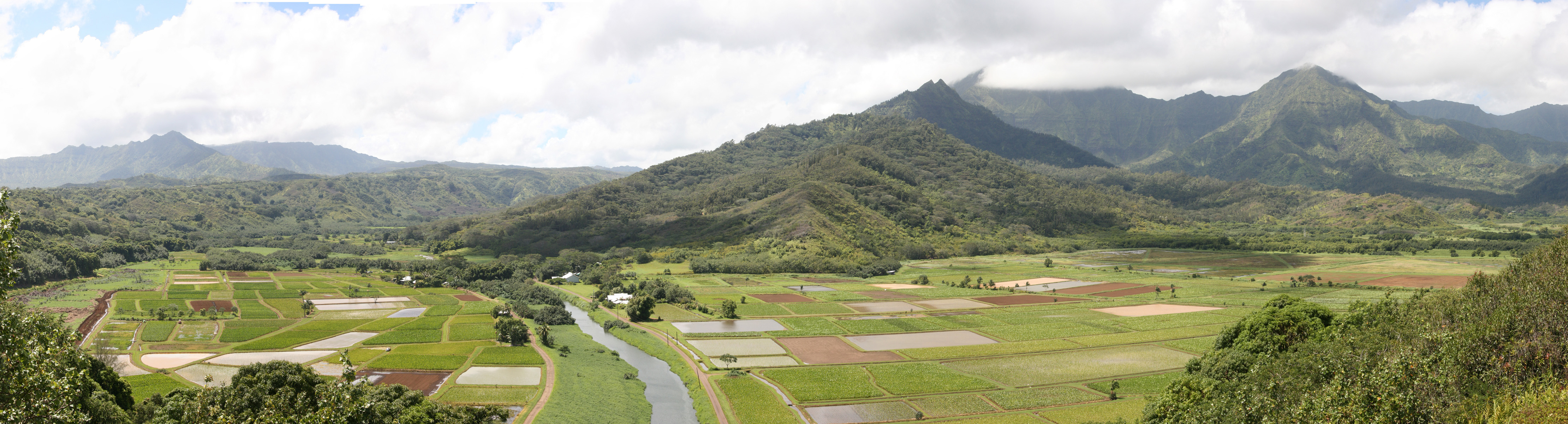
A view of the Hanalei Valley in Northern Kauaʻi. The Hanalei River runs through the valley and 60% of Hawaiʻi's taro is grown in its fields.
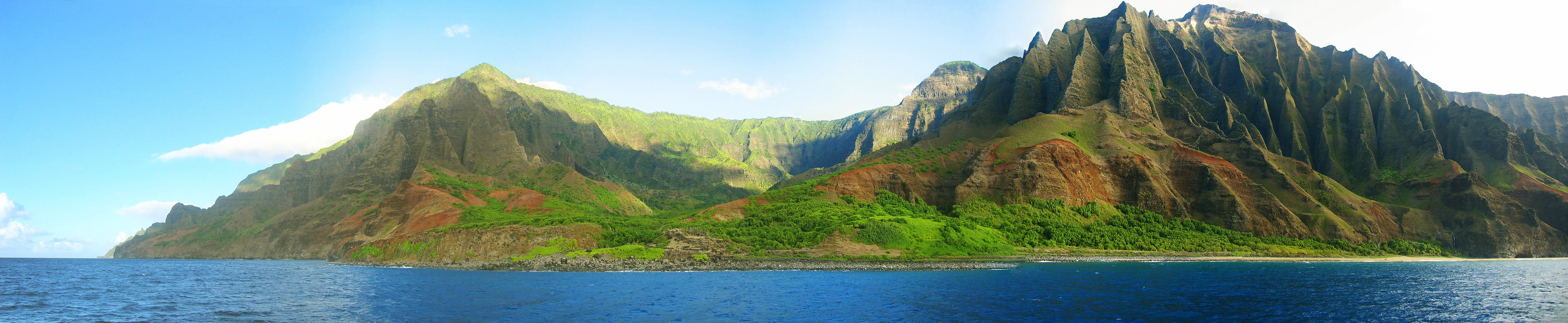
A view of the Nā Pali coastline from the ocean. It is part of the Nā Pali Coast State Park which encompasses 6,175 acres (20 km^{2}) of land and is located on the northwest side of Kauaʻi.
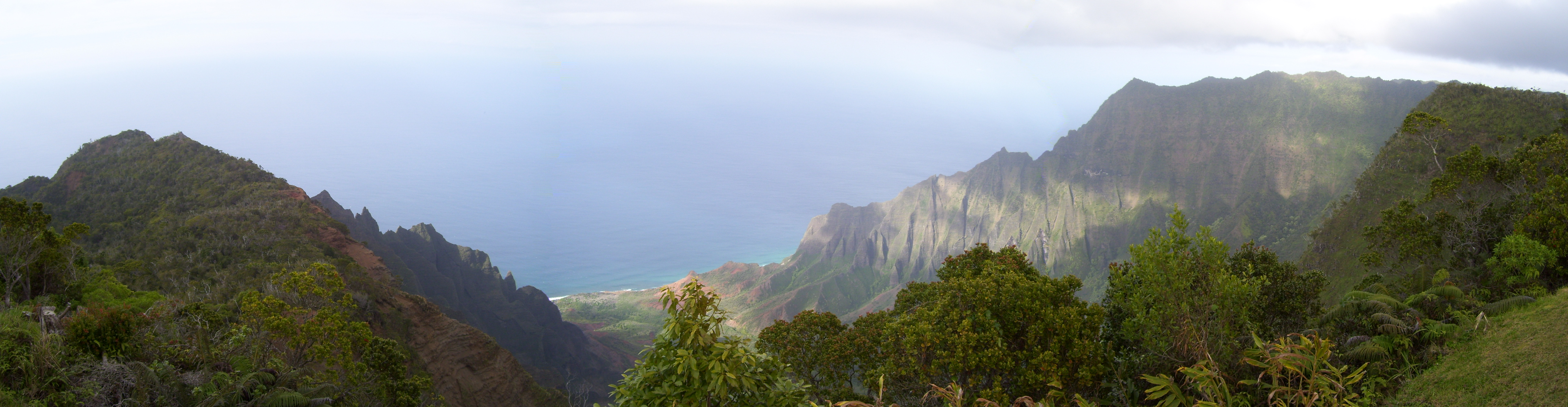
A view of the Kalalau Valley on Kauaʻi's Nā Pali Coast from the Kalalau Lookout

== Popular culture ==
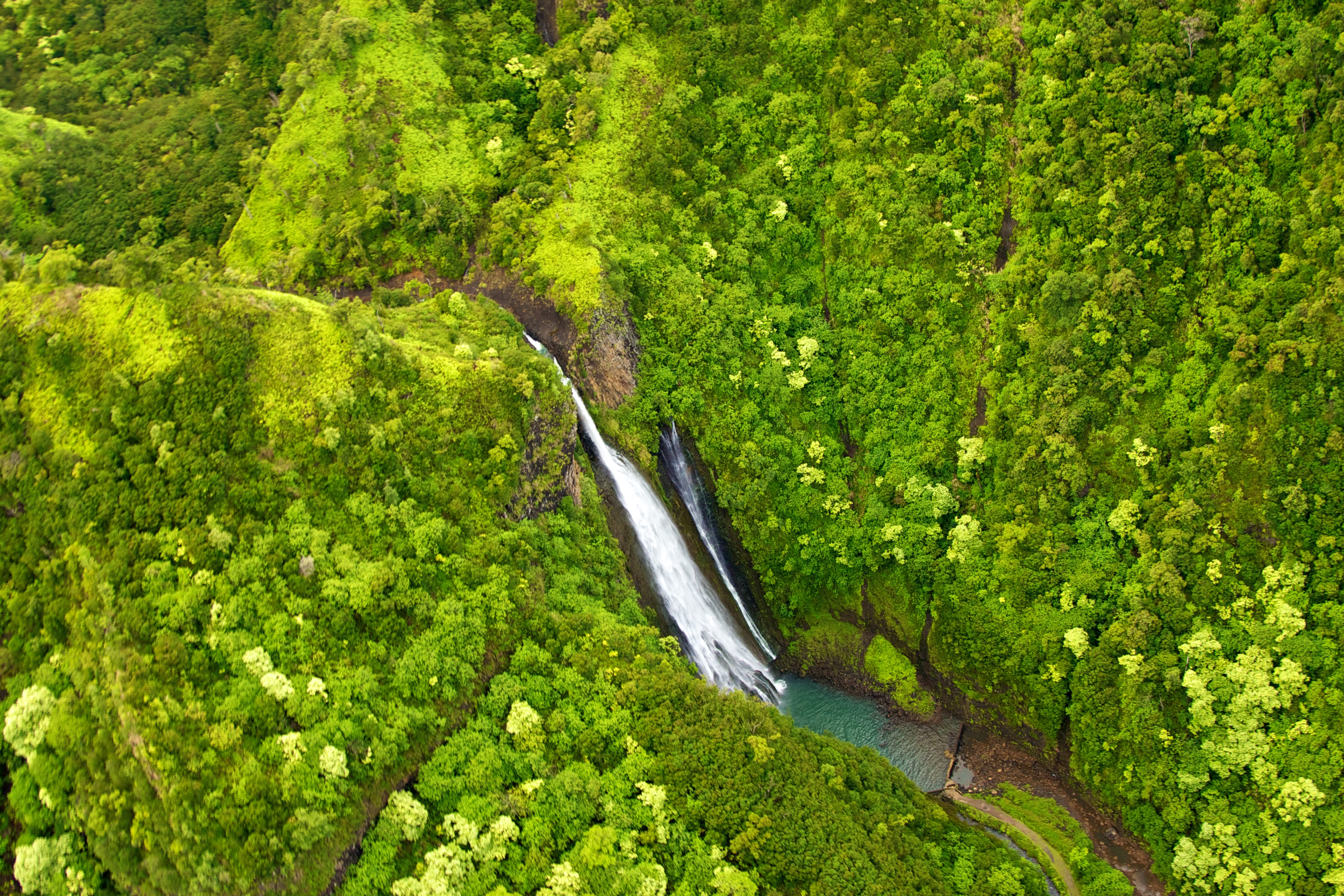
Manawaiopuna Falls, known as "Jurassic Falls" and featured in the 1993 Steven Spielberg film Jurassic Park

Kauaʻi has been featured in more than 70 Hollywood movies and TV shows, including the musical South Pacific and Disney's 2002 animated feature film Lilo & Stitch along with its franchise's three sequel films (2003's Stitch! The Movie, 2005's Lilo & Stitch 2: Stitch Has a Glitch, and 2006's Leroy & Stitch) and first television series (Lilo & Stitch: The Series). Scenes from South Pacific were filmed in the vicinity of Hanalei. Waimea Canyon was used in the filming of the 1993 film Jurassic Park and its 2015 sequel Jurassic World was shot in Kauaʻi. Scenes by a waterfall in Mighty Joe Young were shot in Kauaʻi. Parts of the island were used for the opening scenes of the film Raiders of the Lost Ark. Other movies filmed here include Six Days Seven Nights, the 1976 King Kong, and John Ford's 1963 film Donovan's Reef. Recent films include Tropic Thunder and a biopic of Bethany Hamilton, Soul Surfer. A scene in the opening credits of popular TV show M*A*S*H was filmed in Kauaʻi (helicopter flying over mountain top). Some scenes from Just Go with It, George of the Jungle, and Pirates of the Caribbean: On Stranger Tides were also filmed in Kauaʻi. A Perfect Getaway is set in Kauaʻi.

Parts of the 2002 film Dragonfly were filmed in 2001 in Kauaʻi, but the people and the land were presented as South American.

Major acts of two Elvis Presley films, 1961's Blue Hawaii and 1966's Paradise, Hawaiian Style, were filmed on Kauaʻi. Both have scenes shot at the Coco Palms resort.

The Descendants, a 2011 film, has major parts shot in Kauaʻi, where the main character and his cousins own ancestral lands they are considering selling. The film is based on the 2007 novel by Hawaiian writer Kaui Hart Hemmings.

The Crew Motorfest, an open world racing game, features Kauaʻi as an accessible island in Season 11, alongside the "Kauaʻi Expeditions" playlist; this update was released on October 7, 2026, as part of the game's Year 4 program.

== See also ==
- Beaches of Kauaʻi
- Kauaʻi cave wolf spider
- National Register of Historic Places on Kauaʻi
- Category:Headlands of Kauai
- Category:People from Kauai County, Hawaii
