= Camp Naue YMCA =

Campground in Kauai County, Hawaii

Coordinates: 22.2239°N 159.5534°W

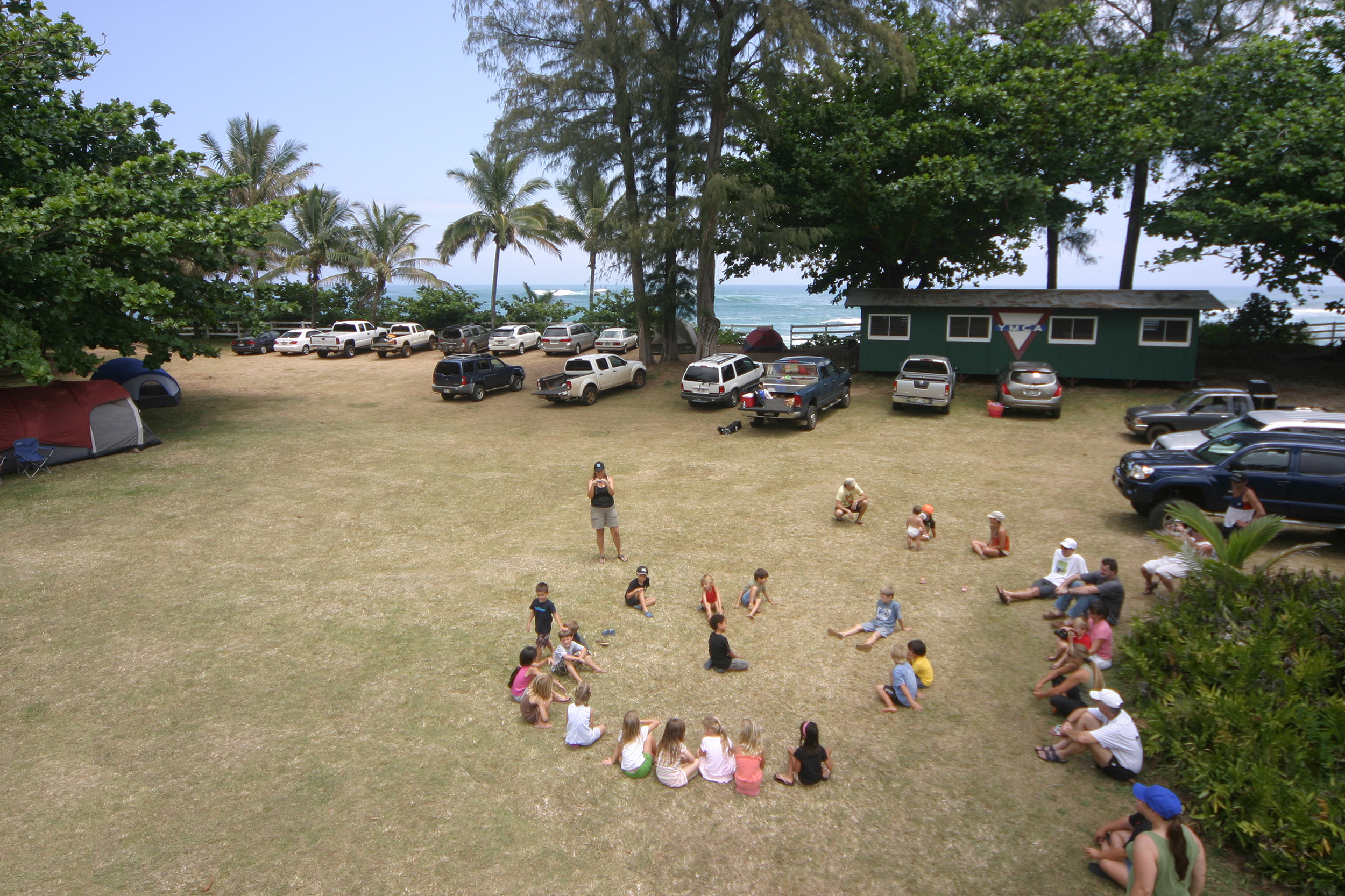
With a bunkhouse and the Pacific Ocean in the background, children from Island School play a game of Duck Duck Goose at Camp Naue.

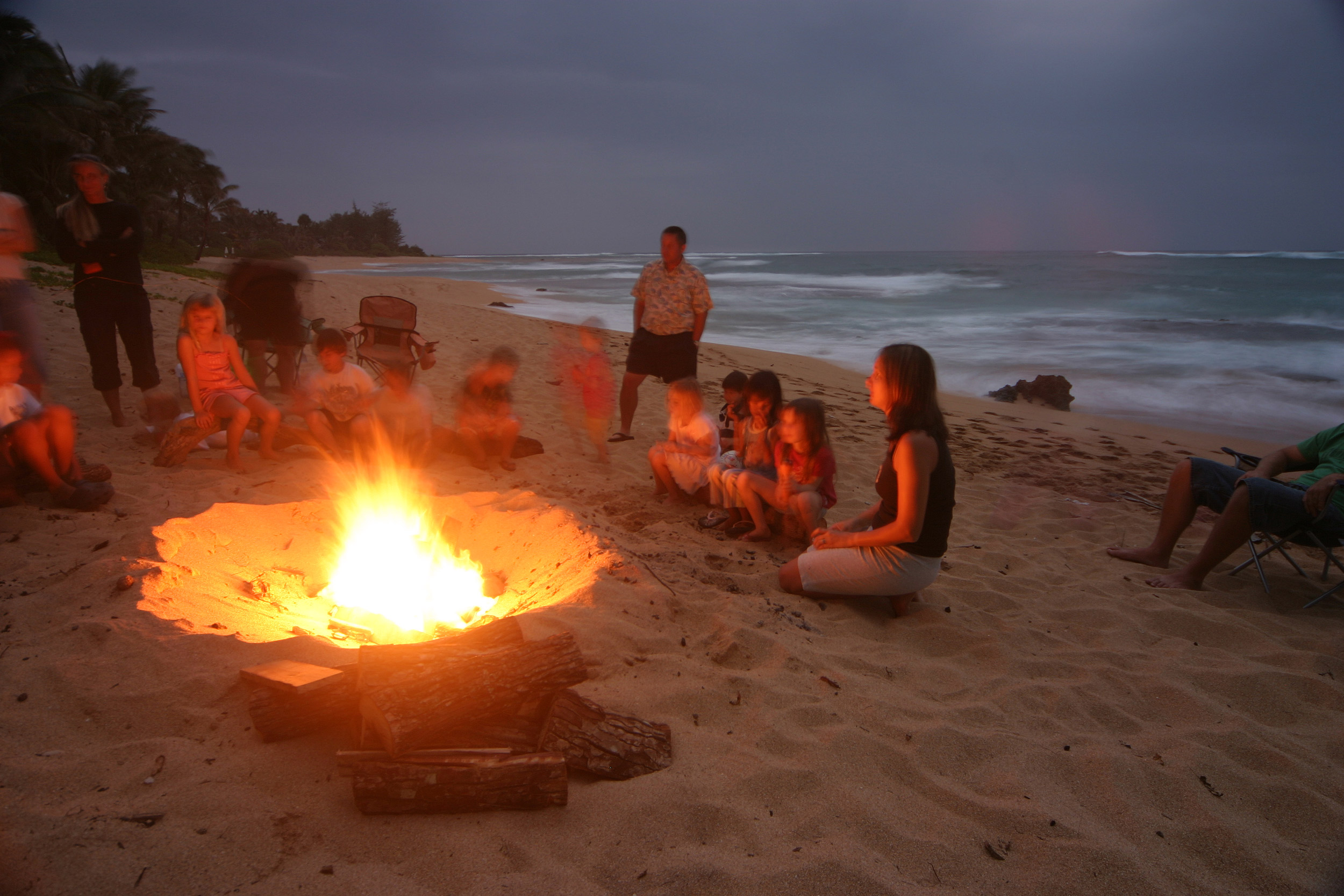
Camp Naue campers gather for an evening campfire on Haena Beach.

Camp Naue YMCA is a 12-acre (4.9 hectare) beachfront campground on the north shore of Kauai, Hawaii. It contains five bunkhouses (cabins), bathrooms, showers, a pavilion, a kitchen and a dining hall. It is used by visiting campers as well as local youth groups. The campground is located directly on Haena Beach. Naue literally means "to move" in Hawaiian.

== Helicopter accident ==
On Sunday, March 11, 2007, a McDonnell Douglas 369 helicopter crashed at Camp Naue. The helicopter, which was operated by Inter-Island Helicopters, was on a sightseeing flight around Kauai. The pilot lost control when the helicopter's tail rotor separated from the tail rotor gearbox and fell into the ocean. The pilot attempted to autorotate into the large field at Camp Naue, but clipped some trees during the descent. The crash left one passenger dead and three in critical condition. The descent and crash were witnessed by several people at the camp. No one on the ground was hurt, but there had been a child's birthday party at the crash site shortly before the incident.
