= Hiʻilawe Waterfall =

- Hiʻilawe Falls from below
- Interactive map of Hiʻilawe Waterfall
- Location: Big Island, Hawaii, United States
- Coordinates: 20°5′40″N 155°35′45″W
- Type: Horsetail
- Total height: 1,450 ft (440 m)
- Number of drops: 2

Hiʻilawe Waterfall is one of the tallest and most powerful waterfalls in Hawaii located on the Big Island. The waterfall drops about 1,450 feet (440 m) with a main drop of 1,201 feet (366 m), into Waipiʻo Valley on Lalakea Stream. Lalakea Stream above the falls has been diverted for irrigation purposes so the falls can be dry even during the wet spring in March.

Hiʻilawe Waterfall

== See also ==
- List of waterfalls
- List of Hawaii waterfalls
