= Puʻukaʻoku Falls =

- Interactive map of Puʻukaʻoku Falls
- Location: Molokai, Hawaii, USA
- Coordinates: 21.1595°N 156.8510°W
- Total height: 2,756 feet (840 m)
- World height ranking: 8th

Puʻukaʻoku Falls is a waterfall on the north side of Molokai, Hawaii. At 2,756 feet (840 m), is the 8th tallest waterfall in the world.

Surroundings: From left to right: Wailele Falls, Pu'uka'oku Falls, Olo'upena Falls and Haloku Falls.

== See also ==
- List of waterfalls
- List of Hawaii waterfalls
- List of waterfalls by height
