= Reverse waterfall =

Phenomenon of water being blown upward

Reverse waterfall is a phenomenon in which water is blown upward due to strong wind in waterfalls giving an apparent perception of water flowing upwards. Strong blowing of wind above about 75 km/h can cause such phenomena.

== List of observed location ==
These have been observed in Australia, India, Japan, the UK, the US and various parts of the world where there is chance of strong wind such as:

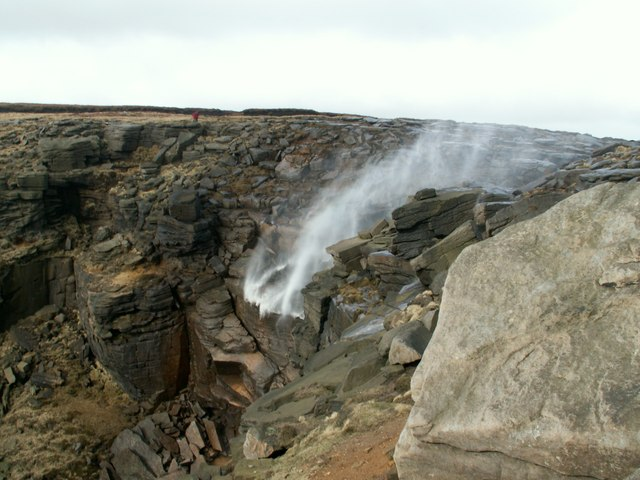
A view of reverse waterfall

- Australia: A wind of 70 km/h caused reverse waterfalls in various location in Sydney, Central Coast, Mid North Coast, Hunter, Illawarra areas and in the Royal National Park.
- India:
  - A waterfall at Naneghat in Malshej Ghat Road near Mumbai
  - Samrad village in the Sandhan Valley has waterfalls showing reverse waterfall during monsoon.
  - Amboli hills near Belgaum have various waterfalls that becomes active in monsoon which gets blown upward due to strong wind.
- Japan: Shiretoko National Park in Japan has Furepe Falls to the Sea of Okhotosk. This fall also gets reversed during strong wind.
- Brazil: In the Chapada Diamantina National Park the Cachoeira da Fumaça (Smoke Waterfall) shows the phenomenon.
- Chile: The waterfall in Talca shows the phenomenon.
- United Kingdom: Has been observed in the Peak District amongst other highland areas, commonly in autumn and winter when strong winds can occur. The Kinder Downfall waterfall in the Kinder Scout area of the Peak District regularly exhibits this phenomenon.
- Ireland: at the Cliffs of Moher, during storm Ciaran (November, 2023).
- United States:
  - Observed on a cliff in Ivins, Utah, Utah on 16 January 2023. Winds created updrafts strong enough to spray the waterfall upwards to the plateau.
  - The Waipuhia Falls in Oahu, Hawaii gets reversed due to north-easterly trade winds.

== See also ==
- List of waterfalls
