= Wailua =

Wailua, Hawaiian for two waters, may refer to:

== Places ==
=== Hawaii, United States ===
==== Kauai ====
- Wailua, Kauai, a town on the east coast
  - Wailuā Homesteads, Hawaii, a nearby town in the hills to the west
- Wailua River, a river in eastern Kauai
  - Wailua Falls, a waterfall along the river
  - Wailua River State Park, a park along the river

==== Maui ====
- Wailua, Maui County, Hawaii, a census-designated place on the north coast
  - Wailua Valley State Wayside Park, a nearby park

=== Indonesia ===
- A city in Ambelau, Indonesia

== Other ==
- Hyposmocoma wailua, a moth endemic to Kaua'i

== See also ==
- Waialua, Hawaii
