= Royal Coconut Coast =

Coordinates: 22.052°N 159.329°W

The Royal Coconut Coast is the designation given to Kauai’s east side, defined as the area between the Wailua Golf Course, heading north along the coast to Kealia Beach, and extending inland toward the center of the island, to Mount Waialeale. The Royal Coconut Coast includes the sacred Wailua River area and the large towns of Wailua and Kapaa. The area's name derives from the acres of coconut trees along the coast and highway. It also has many places of historical and cultural significance. Some of the land is held as sacred and was once reserved for the royalty of Hawaii.

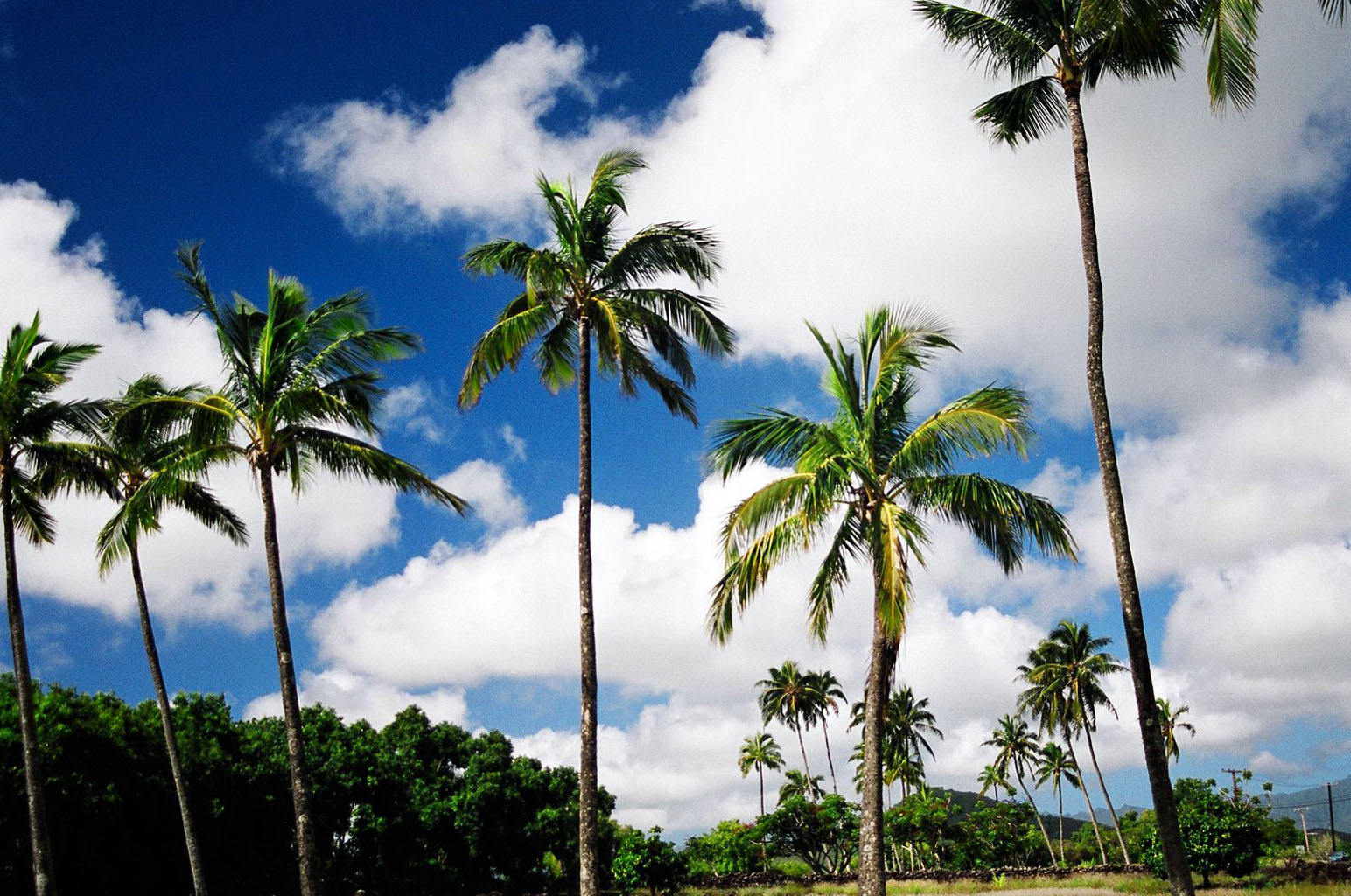
Coconut trees along the Wailua River of Kauai, Hawaii, gives the area its nickname as the Royal Coconut Coast.

The Royal Coconut Coast is a diverse and popular area due to its central location on Kauai. It appeals to both residents and visitors, with a solid concentration of hotels and attractions. Many of Kauai's lodging properties are in this area, and it has many popular beaches, parks, restaurants, shopping centers, hiking and biking trails, and general services.

== Geography ==
The Royal Coconut Coast includes the towns of Wailua, Olohena, Waipouli, Kapaa and Kealia. According to the 2010 US census, Kapaa is Kauai's most populous town, with 10,250 of the island's 67,091 residents. The Royal Coconut Coast is popular in part due to its central location relative to Kauai's primary attractions. It is a 15-minute drive to Lihue Airport, Kauai's main airport, and Lihue, Kauai's second-largest town. From the Royal Coconut Coast area, it is about an hour's drive to travel to any side of Kauai—the scenic north shore, including Princeville and Hanalei; the sunny south shore, including Poipu and Koloa; or the dry west side, including Hanapepe and Waimea.

The Royal Coconut Coast includes land that extends from the Kalepa Mountain Range that begins in Hanamaulu and continues north to the Kealia Mountain Range. It includes over ten miles of coastline with several beach parks and recreational areas. This area correlates with the original land distribution system known as ahupuaa in use in ancient Hawaii. The Royal Coconut Coast includes the ahupuaa areas known as Wailua Kai, traditionally called "Wailuanuiahoano", and Wailua Uka. The Royal Coconut Coast also has the Wailua River, Hawaii's only navigable river, meaning it is the only river in the state that is deep, wide, and slow enough to allow vessels to pass.

One of the most prominent mountains on Kauai, Nounou Mountain, which is also called Sleeping Giant, is on the Royal Coconut Coast. This easily identifiable mountain is visible upon entering the Royal Coconut Coast region along the north side of the Wailua River. It gets its nickname from its shape, as it resembles a giant lying on his back with his face on the south end, a large stomach in the middle, and feet at the north end. There are several legends about how the sleeping giant came to be, but the most popular tells of a gentle giant who used to live among the ancient Hawaiian people, helping them build heiau by gathering large rocks and logs from high in the mountains. After he helped complete a large project, the local village had a luau or party in his honor, and the giant ate so much that evening he lay down and never awoke. Several hiking trails are along this mountain, including the Nounou West Trail, Nounou East Trail, and the Kuamoo trail, all leading to the summit and offering views of the region.

== Climate ==
The climate along the Royal Coconut Coast is consistent with many windward areas of Hawaii. The trade winds that hit Kauai typically blow from the east, sometimes bringing light showers and providing cool breezes most of the year to Hawaii's tropical climate. For the most part, weather in Hawaii only has two seasons: summer, from May to October, and winter, from November to April. Winter typically brings more storms and wetter weather, especially to the windward sides of the island, and slightly cooler temperatures. Average summer highs range from 80-85 degrees and lows from 70-75 degrees, while winter highs range from 75-80 degrees and lows from 65-70 degrees. Areas along the coast do not see as much rainfall, averaging less than 50 inches of rain per year, but some inland mountains receive over 400 inches of rain per year.

== History ==
There are many important historical areas along the Royal Coconut Coast. The most heavily concentrated historical areas lie along the Wailua River. This sacred land offered a strategic advantage for the ancient Hawaiians who inhabited the area. The Wailua River is fed from the constant rainfall at Mount Waialeale, one of the rainiest places in the world. The constant supply of water made the land along the river very sacred, as the ancients never feared a drought or food shortage. This land was once reserved for the alii, Hawaii's royalty. Many sacred sites, including heiau, or places of worship, still exist along the river. These sacred sites were where important cultural customs and traditions, ceremonies, and worship and religious practices were performed.

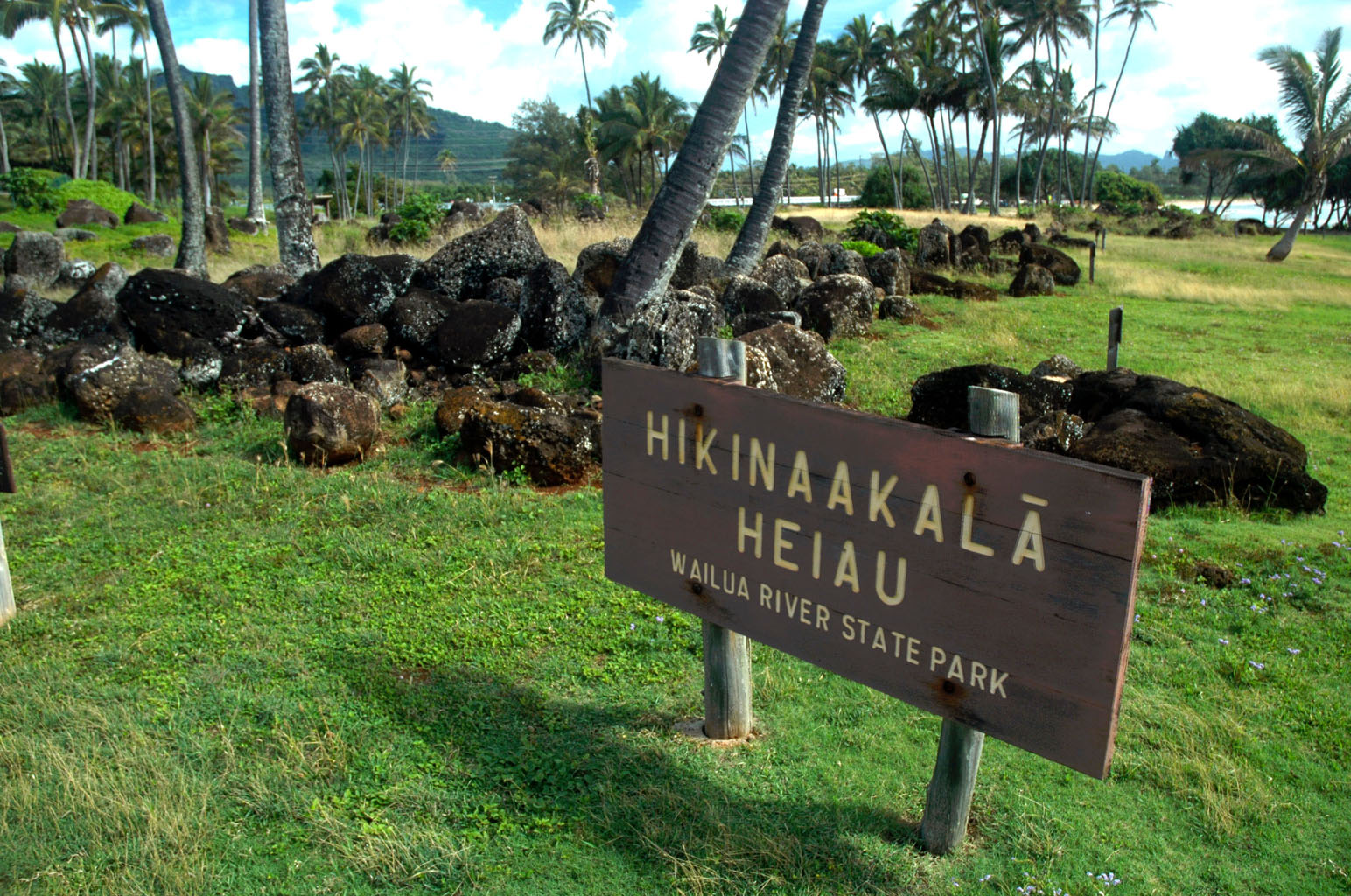
A view of the Hikinaakala Heiau, located in the Wailua River State Park, along the Royal Coconut Coast of Kauai, Hawaii.

In ancient times Wailua Bay was a main port of entry as you directly enter the Wailua River and easily travel inland. Near the river mouth, on the south side of the river is Hikinaakala at Hauola heiau, a place of peace, health and healing, where ancient Hawaiians worshipped the rising sun. Many ancient artifacts have been found in the area and petroglyphs are still seen here. This heiau also served as a pu’uhonua, or place of refuge, where defeated warriors or criminals fleeing prosecution could stay safe from pursuit. In ancient times refugees remained within the walls for days giving offerings to the gods and seeking forgiveness.

Upriver is one of Hawaii's most sacred sites, the Holoholoku heiau, one of the oldest known places of worship. Within the heiau are the Royal Birthing Stones: two boulders known as the pohaku hanau, where expectant mothers sat on the flat stone and rested their backs on the other. This area was dedicated to birthing king; only royalty were born here. Kauai's last king, Kaumualii, was the last king born here, in the mid-1800s.

Another heiau, Poli’ahu, is further upriver on a narrow ridge between Opaeka’a Stream and Wailua River. This was one of Kauai's largest heiau and was used only by the ali’i nui (ruling chief) and kahuna nui (head priest).

Near the mouth of the Wailua River sits the remnants of the Coco Palms Resort, a site of more modern history. This site was dedicated to the chiefs of Kauai for many centuries, but became one of the first inns of Kauai, run by Deborah Kapule, the favorite wife of King Kaumuali’i. Kapule was a gracious host and one of the original promoters of Kauai's visitor industry in the 1850s, often bringing visitors up the Wailua River in ancient canoes.

Coco Palms Resort opened in the 1950s and hosted many famous stars and celebrities of the time, including Frank Sinatra, Bing Crosby, Elvis Presley, Duke Kahanamoku, and the von Trapp Family Singers. In 1961, Presley filmed Blue Hawaii on the grounds of the Coco Palms Resort, securing its notoriety and popularity for many travelers to Kauai. The Coco Palms Resort was devastated in 1992 by Hurricane Iniki and has not reopened. Another 11 hotel and condominium resort properties have been established in the area.

== Beaches ==
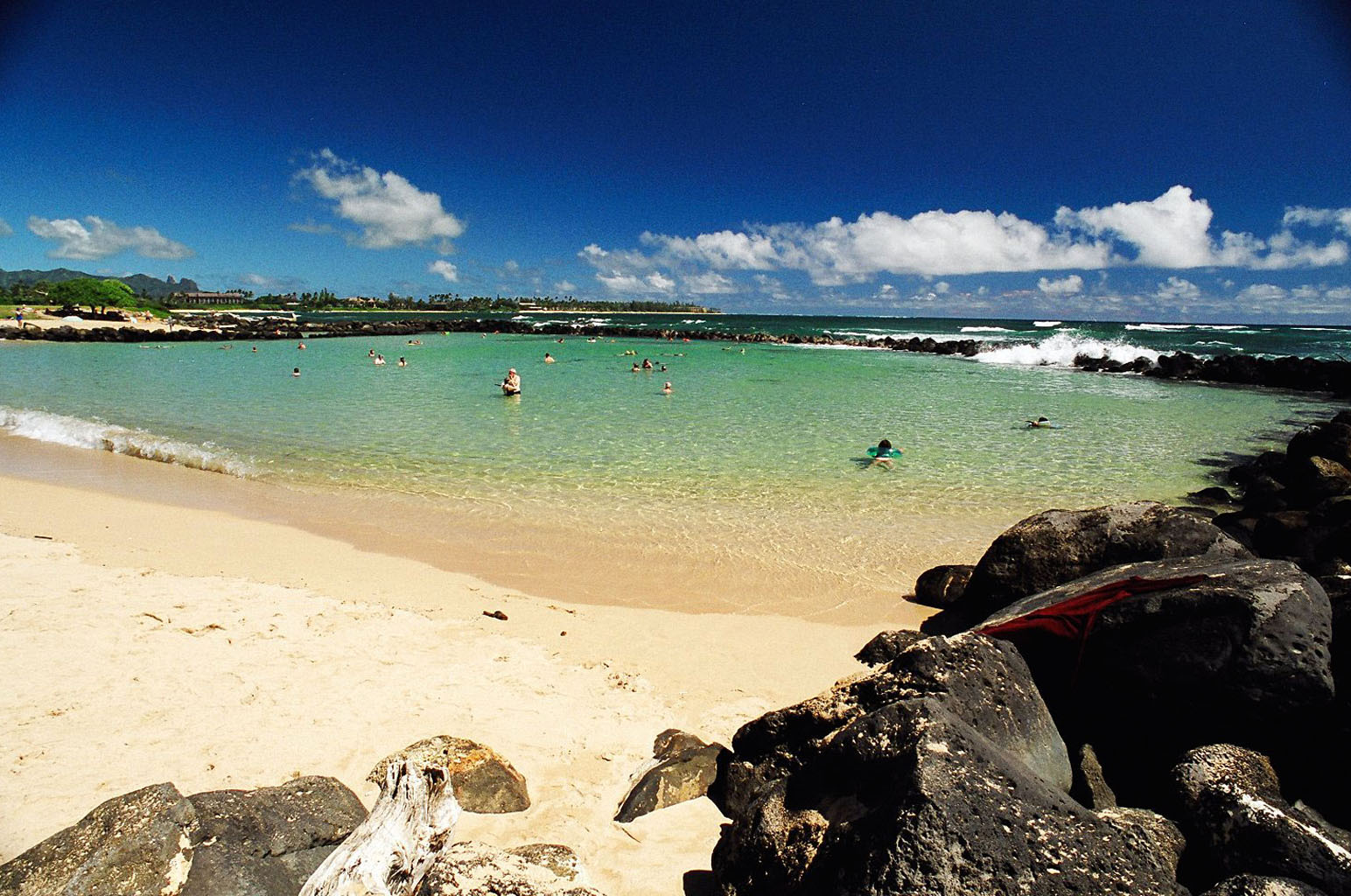
Swimmers enjoying the calm pools at Lydgate Beach Park located along the Royal Coconut Coast of Kauai, Hawaii.

The first major beach along the Royal Coconut Coast is Lydgate Beach Park. It is extremely popular for families and is just south of the Wailua River. It has a large, double-sectioned salt water pool, created by a lava rock wall in the ocean. The smaller pool is frequented by families with toddlers and small children, and the larger pool is ideal for swimming and snorkeling Young children are drawn to Kamalani playground, an extravagant playground with two different sections nearby, connected by a paved path. Lydgate is one of Kauai's most popular beaches for swimmers, picnickers, campers, fishermen, surfers, windsurfers, divers and beachcombers. It is a lifeguarded beach, with several restroom and shower facilities.

Wailua Bay or Wailua Beach is great for walking and beachcombing, but not ideal for swimming. It is the short stretch of beach north of the Wailua River and ending at the rocky point to the north. It has no lifeguard, and a strong shore break and strong rip currents make it hazardous. Swimming near the river mouth can be dangerous and unpredictable, and the murky water attracts predators.

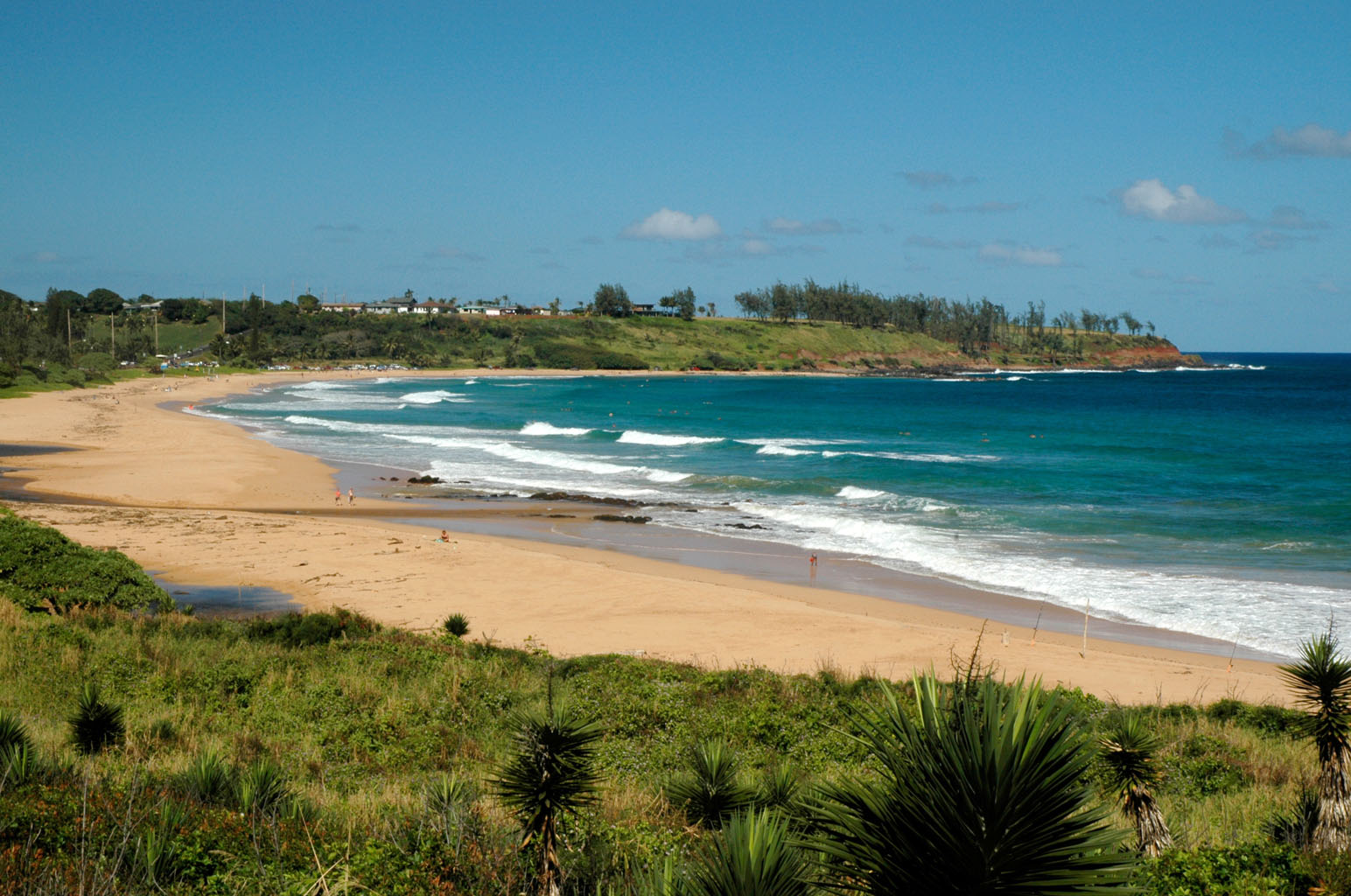
A view of Kealia Beach, a popular beach located along the Royal Coconut Coast of Kauai, Hawaii.

Continuing north, the next beach along the Royal Coconut Coast is Waipouli Beach, a long narrow beach fronting the Waipouli Beach Resort. The beach is fronted by wide sections of bedrock but small patches of sandy area can be found in the water amongst the reef. Wading and swimming is cautioned here as strong currents and sudden drop offs are prevalent.

Kapa’a Beach Park, near the highway that runs through Kapa’a town, has been eroding for years. It is shallow and rocky and not very appealing for swimming, although several sand pockets are available during high tide. Fishermen frequent the area, hunting for fish and octopus and gathering seaweed.

Kealia Beach, on the Royal Coconut Coast's northernmost end, is a favorite for locals and visitors who surf or body board. It features a long golden-sand beach, with consistent waves depending on the ocean conditions. In the summer, the waves can be small enough for children to catch a ride at the far end of the beach, due to the small lava rock jetty creating quiet conditions. In the winter, surfing and swimming here should be done with caution, as large swells can create a dangerous shore break. Always check with the lifeguard for current conditions.

== Attractions ==
The Wailua River is one of the Royal Coconut Coast's main attractions. It drains into Wailua Bay, and offers recreational opportunities for three miles extending inland. It is popular for all types of water activities, including kayaking, canoe paddling, boating, waterskiing, wakeboarding, fishing, and stand-up paddleboarding. Kayak tours are available that travel upriver and include a short hike to a beautiful waterfall.

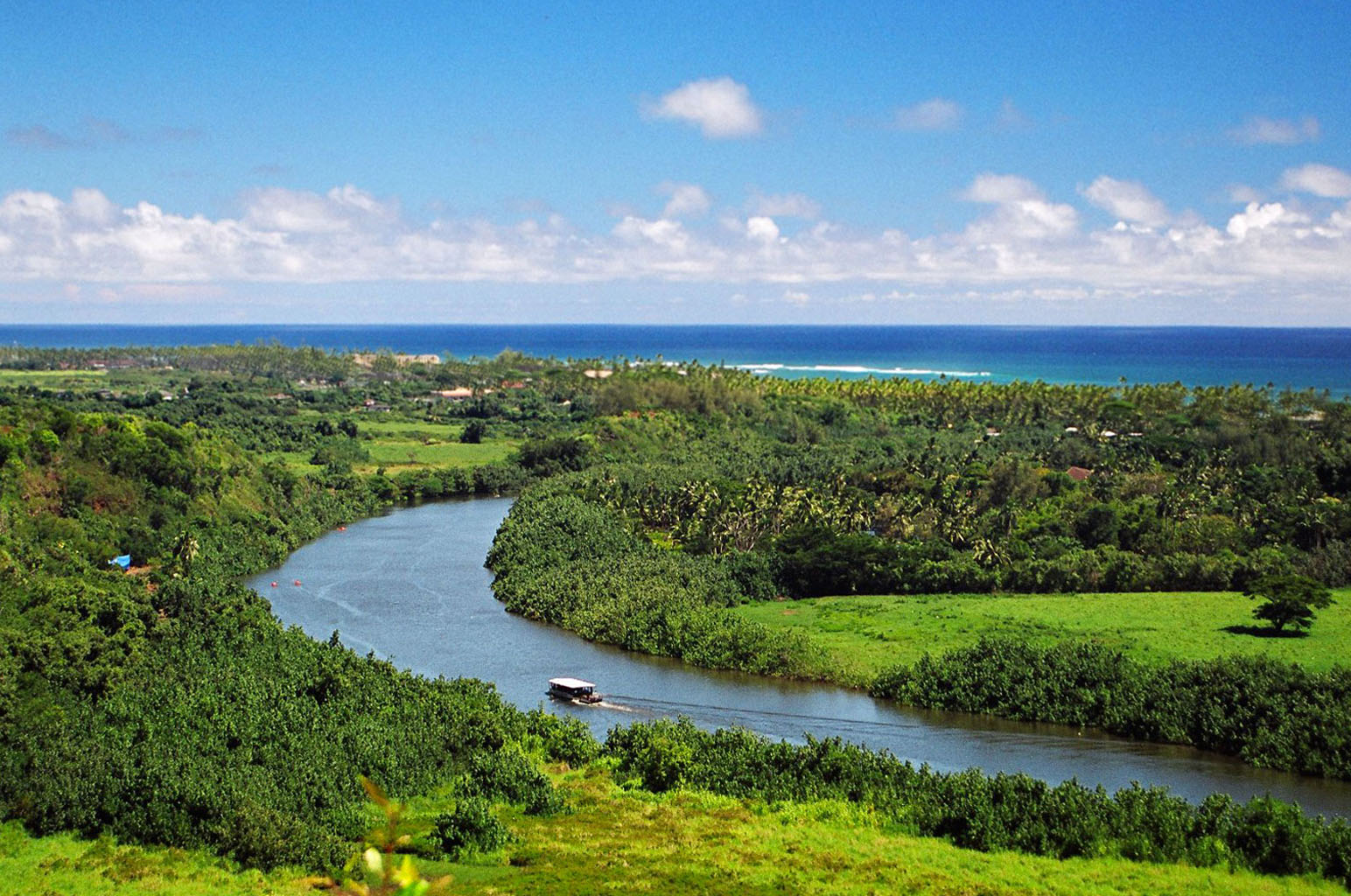
A river boat cruises along the Wailua River located on the east side of Kauai, Hawaii in the area known as the Royal Coconut Coast.

Flat bottom river boats tour the Wailua River up to the Fern Grotto, a large cave with long streamers of ferns hanging down from the ceiling. This amplitheater-shaped cave is one of Kauai's most famous attractions. The site, which provides unusually clear acoustics in addition to its lush vegetation, was used for ancient traditions and rituals, and remains a popular wedding site today.

North along Hawaii Route 56, immediately past the Wailua River bridge, is an important intersection. If you turn left on to Kuamoo Road (Hwy 580) and take a short drive up the mountain, you will reach a beautiful lookout point to Opaeka’a Falls. Directly across the street from that lookout is access to Kamokila Village, a re-created ancient Hawaiian village, open to visitors.

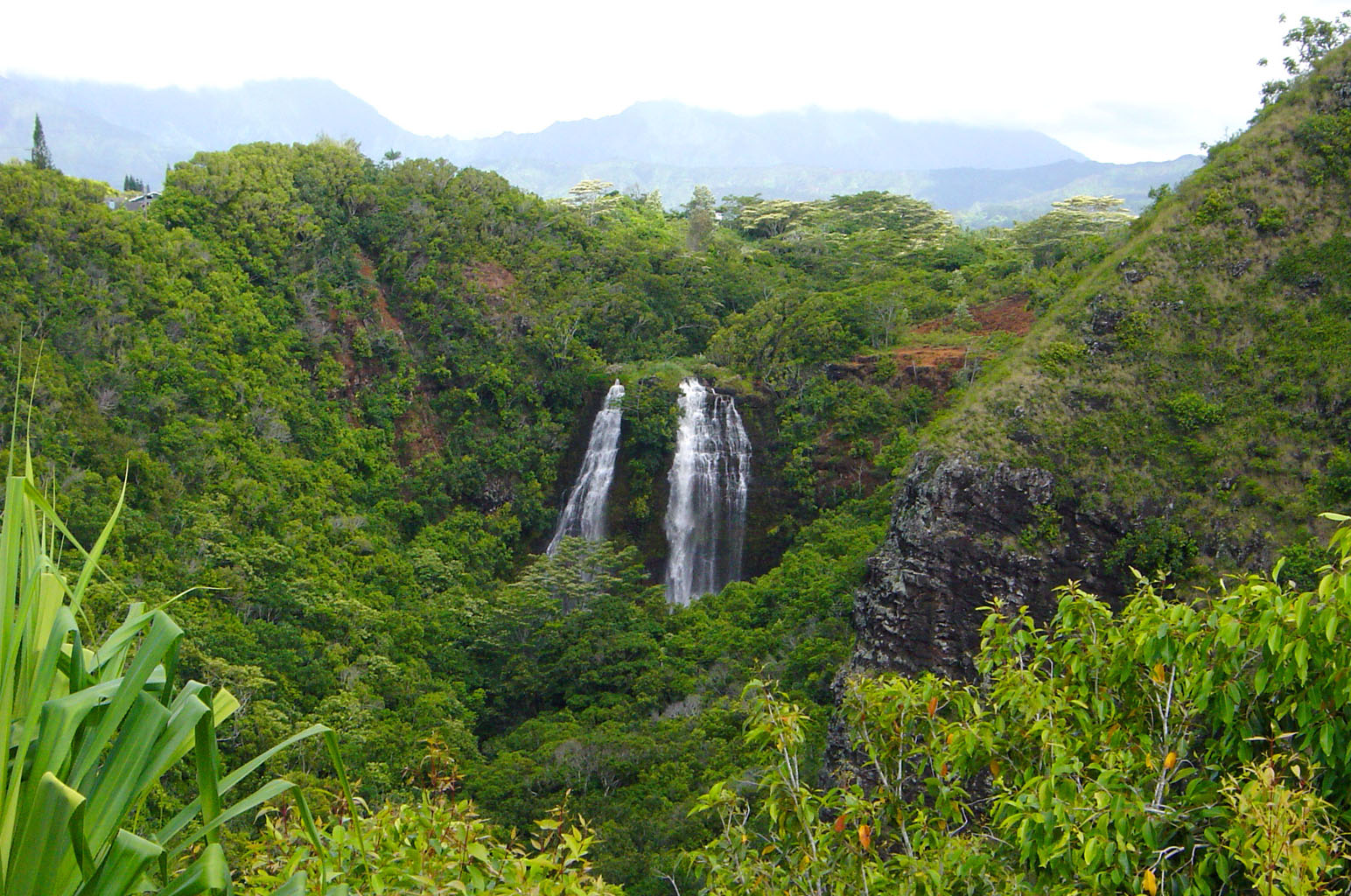
A view of Opaekaa Falls, meaning "rolling shrimp", fed by the Wailua River and located along the Royal Coconut Coast of Kauai, Hawaii.

North on Highway 56, a few minutes past the Wailua River, is Coconut Marketplace, an open-air shopping center with a variety of retail shops, restaurants, and services. A farmers' market is hosted here twice a week, and live music and theatre are routinely held at the marketplace.

Farther north along Highway 56 is the popular town of Kapaa. This area features many retail shops, art galleries, restaurants, larger shopping centers, grocery stores, pharmacies, and general services like banks, medical services, a library, and a post office. Several hotels and resorts are nearby, many within walking distance. A farmers' market is held in Kapaa every week and a craft fair full of locally made arts and goods is open every day.

Several surfing locations are prevalent along the Royal Coconut Coast. The most popular surf breaks are at Wailua beach and Kealia Beach. Surfing in Wailua Bay should be left to the experts while Kealia is safer, as it is a lifeguarded beach. Conditions change constantly, so always be aware of ocean and weather conditions.

The Ke Ala Hele Makalae coastal multi-use path is located along the Royal Coconut Coast, it is 3.8 miles long traveling along the coast to Kealia Beach. There are several beach parks with restrooms and drinking fountains along the way, as well as several scenic lookouts and sheltered picnic pavilions. The trail is open to walkers, joggers, bikers, skateboarders, and rollerbladers. In addition, there is a 2.5 mile multi-use pathway located at Lydgate Beach Park. Kauai County is in the process of building a multi-use pathway between the Ke Ala Hele Makalae and Lydgate pathways to connect the entire Royal Coconut Coast with a coastal biking and walking route.

Many other activities and attractions are available in the area including snorkeling, scuba diving, tubing, ziplining, horseback riding, golfing, and hiking.

== Accommodations ==
The Royal Coconut Coast offers many attractive accommodations at reasonable prices. Almost one third of Kauai's lodging properties are on this stretch of coastline. Many options are available, from high-end resorts to more cost-efficient vacation rentals, small inns, or bed and breakfasts. Most accommodations offer views of the mountain, ocean, or both, and are within walking distance to shops and public transportation.

== See also ==
- List of beaches in Kauai
- National Register of Historic Places listings in Hawaii#Kauai
- Tourism in Hawaii
