= Smith's Kauai =

Smith's Kauai is a family business established by Walter Smith, Sr. and his wife Emily in 1947 on the Wailua River and Wailua Marina State Park on the Hawaiian island of Kauai. It began with a rowboat and borrowed outboard motor and by the 1950s had expanded to include the Fern Grotto Wailua River Cruise, which featured more than a dozen vessels in 2016. Subsequent additions included the 30-acre botanical and cultural garden, Smith's Tropical Paradise, as well as Smith's Weddings In Paradise and the Smith Family Garden Luau.
