= ʻŌpaekaʻa Falls =

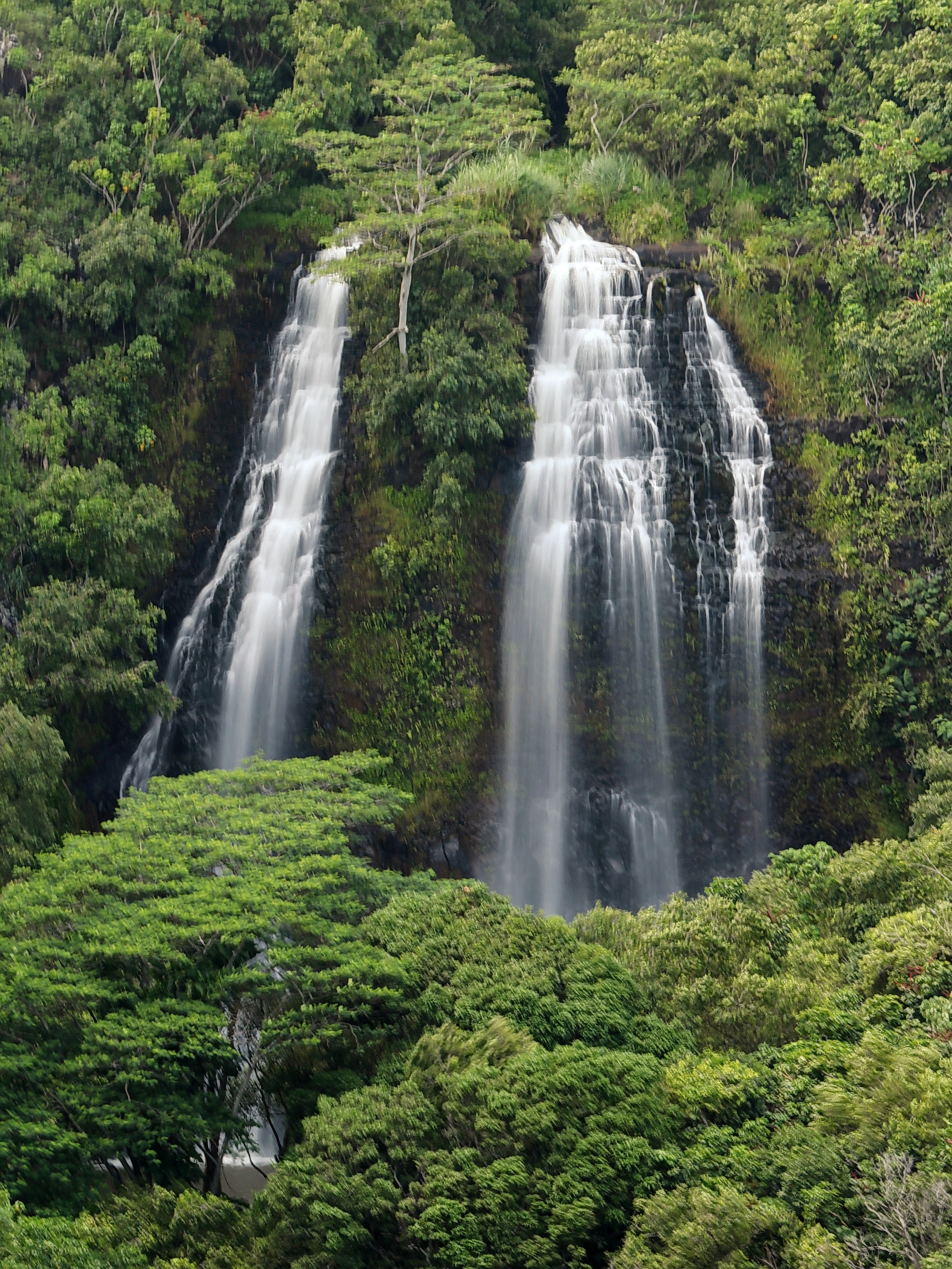
- ʻŌpaekaʻa Falls
- Interactive map of ʻŌpaekaʻa Falls
- Location: Wailua River in Wailua River State Park on Kauai, Hawaii
- Coordinates: 22°02′53″N 159°21′43″W
- Type: Cascade
- Total height: 151 feet (46.02 m) 151 ft (46 m)
- Number of drops: 2

ʻŌpaekaʻa Falls is a waterfall located on the ʻŌpaekaʻa Stream in Wailua River State Park on the eastern side of the Hawaiian island of Kauai. It is a 151-foot (46 m) waterfall that flows over basalt from volcanic eruptions millions of years ago. Below the ridge down into the ravine through which the water falls can be seen the vertical dikes of basalt that cut through the horizontal Koloa lava flows. The name "ʻŌpaekaʻa" means rolling shrimp, "ʻopae" being Hawaiian for "shrimp," and "kaʻa" for "rolling". The name dates back to days when the native freshwater shrimp Atyoida bisulcata were plentiful in the stream and were seen rolling and tumbling down the falls and into the churning waters at the fall's base.

Visually, this is a spectacular waterfall and is one of the island's few waterfalls that can be seen from the road. It flows year round and therefore is not seasonal. Most of the time it falls in a double cascade but the two sides may become one after a heavy rain. There is a highway overlook which provides a panoramic view of the 40-foot (12 m) wide falls and the valley below. The best time of day to see the falls is in full sunlight when the water sparkles the most. If the day is cloudy the view is less spectacular.

== View from highway ==
Surroundings

The highway parking lot offers an excellent overview of the double ʻŌpaekaʻa Falls. The tops of the Makeleha Mountains can be seen in the background while tropical birds soar through the valley below. The best view of the falls is seen by taking the sidewalk past the parking lot and walking toward the bridge. The Wailua River can be viewed by crossing the road at the pedestrian crossing sign.

== Trail closures ==
It is not possible to climb down to where the water falls into a pool. The trail has been blocked by a steel fence since 2006 when two women fell off an unofficial but well-publicized rocky path to the pool. Two other hikers found their bodies 35 feet (11 m) away from the pool. At the time they fell from the path the state had already posted a sign at head of trail saying "Danger Keep Out — Hazardous Conditions". This means that currently neither the top nor the bottom of the waterfall can be accessed on foot. However, unofficially there are paths to both places, so-called "secret trails", which circulate via guide books, websites and by word of mouth. "It's clear that anything that may look like a trail around ʻŌpaekaʻa is not a state-sanctioned trail," said the head of the island's official trails system. State park officials have made it clear that the trail was never part of the park's official trail system and that the steel blockade to the trail will remain in place for the foreseeable future. Violating the blockade is considered a misdemeanor with a possible penalty of a fine of up to $1,000 and up to 30 days in jail.

The closing of these "unofficial" trails is very controversial and many hikers think that people should be allowed to take their chances. They feel that warning sign and other state measures are merely an attempt for the state to avoid lawsuits.

There are rumors that there is an unkempt 0.6-mile (0.97 km) hunter trail leading to the bottom, where there is access to the large, deep pool at the bottom of the falls. Many deny the existence of the trail due to the danger in following these trails.

== Directions ==
Once on island, the falls can be accessed by Route 580. At the milepost 6, 580 heads inland for three miles (5 km). Route 580 is called Kuamoʻo Road at this point and it is 1.5 miles (2.4 km) to the ʻŌpaekaʻa Falls parking lot and overlook. Route 580 goes through a notch in the ridge that the Wailua River has eroded. There are no state-maintained trails to either the top or the bottom of the waterfall from the Kuamoʻo Road overlook.

== Nearby sights ==
On the opposite side of the road near the falls is the relatively well-preserved ancient temple of Poliʻahu Heiau, also thought to have once been a luakini. It is named after the snow goddess, Poliʻahu, sister of Pele, the goddess of fire, lightning, volcanoes and violence. Also nearby is the bell stone believed to have been used by ancient Hawaiians to ward off danger. Striking the bell with another stone results in a distinctive low frequency sound that can be heard for at least a mile down the valley.

Wailua Falls is also nearby.

== See also ==
- List of waterfalls
- List of Hawaii waterfalls
