= Kupua =

Group of Hawaiian supernatural entities

In Hawaiian mythology, the Kupua are a group of supernatural entities which might be considered gods or spirits (see also Atua).

Hawaiian myths and legends abound with such characters. They are traditionally described as monsters having the power of appearing in different kinds of bodies. They usually have cruel and vindictive characters and are ready to destroy and devour any persons they can catch. There are, however, many kupuas of kindly spirit who give watchful care to the members of their own families.

Many Hawaiian kupua are considered as gods having a double body, sometimes appearing as a man and sometimes being able to change shape, into an animal, vegetable, or mineral form. The latter form always possesses supernatural powers. William Westervelt mentions the following classification for kupua:

- Ka-poe-kino-lau (the people who had leaf bodies)
- Ka-poe-kino-pua (the people who had flower bodies)
- Ka-poe-kino-manu (the people who had bird bodies)
- Ka-poe-kino-laau (trees of all kinds, ferns, vines, etc.)
- Ka-poe-kino-pupu (all shells)
- Ka-poe-kino-ao (all clouds)
- Ka-poe-kino-maani (all winds)
- Ka-poe-kina-ia (all fish)
- Ka-poe-kina-mano (all sharks)
- Ka-poe-kina-limu (all sea-mosses)
- Ka-poe-kina-pokaku (all peculiar stones)
- Ka-poe-kina-hiwa-hiwa (all dangerous places of the pali)

== Famous kupua in Hawaiian legends ==
Mamala the surf-rider was a chiefess of kupua character. She might appear as a shark, a lizard, or a woman. Her surfing skills were so impressive that people would gather on the beach to applaud her performance. She was married to the shark-man Ouha, but later left him for a chief named Hono-kau-pu.

In an old Honolulu legend, a kupua, who is a dog-man, overthrows the government of Kahanai and becomes the ruling power between Nuuanu Valley and the sea. He is a cannibal, and many of the people are killed and eaten by him. He can appear at will either as a man or a dog.

In Maui, the king once had a kupua, a rooster, which was very cruel and destructive. He could assume a different bird form for each magic power he possessed. This, with his miraculous human powers, made him superior to all the roosters which had ever been his antagonists in cock-fighting.

In Kauai, Akua-pehu-ale (god-of-the-swollen-billow) was a kupua who devoured his enemies and was greatly feared and hated even by his own tribe.

In the legend of the bread-fruit tree, Papa, one of the ancestors of the people living in all the islands now known as Polynesia, is described as a kupua. Her daughter Kap-ula-kinau also has kupua, or magic power.

Other Hawaiian kupua mentioned in the mythology include the famous tricksters Māui and Kamapua'a, Iwa, Ono, and Pekoi, amongst others.

== See also ==
- Apukohai
