= Aikanaka =

ʻAikanaka is a Hawaiian name.

- Aikanaka (mythology), mortal who married Lona, the moon goddess
- Aikanaka of Kauai (born c. 1680) also known as Kaweloaikanaka, 18th Aliʻi Aimoku of Kauaʻi; ruled as titular chief of Kauaʻi
- ʻAikanaka (father of Keohokālole) (died 1837), Hawaiian grand chief and grandfather of King Kalakaua

== See also ==
- Aikana (disambiguation)
- Ekanayake
