= Economic history of Kauaʻi =

The economic history of Kauaʻi dates back to before the European colonization of Kauaʻi. Before Captain James Cook discovered the Hawaiian island chain in 1778, the native Polynesians of Kauai had a complex subsistence economy of fishing and trade among the other islands. In 1835, the first successful sugarcane plantation was established in Koloa, Kauaʻi and was the beginning of a prosperous sugarcane industry. Sugarcane remained Kauaʻi's most dominant industry until the mid-20th century. Today, Kauaʻi is a tourism-centered economy with 1,279,968 people visiting the island in 2017. Visitor spending on the island the same year exceeded $1.83 billion—a 9.3% percent increase from the previous year. However, Kauai still boasts a strong agricultural economy with corn seed being the number one crop alongside coffee, guava, and taro.

== Economy before 1778 ==
Much of the history known about ancient Kauaʻi's economy stems from archaeological discoveries and legends passed on by native families as the island remained undiscovered by the Western World until 1778. Historians believe Polynesian voyagers started inhabiting Kauaʻi around 600 AD due to carbon dating found on materials around the island. The early settlers of Kauai clustered around the geographic locations which were suitable for fishing and agriculture. The main hub for Hawaiians on Kauaʻi was the East side of the island now known as the Royal Coconut Coast. This was due to the fact that the land and climate was suitable for the growth of coconuts, taro, yams, and bananas.

The native Polynesians relied on a mainly subsistence economy in which there were no exchanges of currency. However, an explosive population growth around 1100 caused a systematic reorganization in the structure of their society due to resource scarcity. This led to the emergence of three main social classes: chiefs (aliʻi), commoners (makaʻainana), and priests (kahuna). The ruling chief (aliʻi nui) had complete control over the land and materials of their kingdom and possessed the power to redistribute the wealth at any time. Temporary land grants were loaned by the aliʻi nui to the aliʻi who had the common populace work on the lands. The makaʻainana cultivating the land paid labor taxes to the overseer of the land every week. This land relationship between the ruling class and the commoners was closely related to that of Europe's feudalism.

The society and economy in pre-1778 Kauaʻi was mainly based around extended families (‘ohana). Families were believed to have worked cooperatively on an ahupuaʻa—a section of land that ran from the sea to the mountains. The Polynesians cultivated various different crops including tuber and tropical roots. Taro, yams, and sweet potatoes were also grown in various parts of the island. Hawaiians also domesticated dogs, chicken, Evidence suggests the makaʻainana were able to live well-above poverty levels and enjoyed various activities, games, and sports.

Over time, the economy of Hawaii as a whole became more complex. Families specialized in certain skills, and islands became specialized in certain skilled trades. Although Kauaʻi's isolated location made it harder for trade to occur, the islands did participate in the trading of fish, canoes, and bark cloth.

== The changing economy ==
After their discovery by the British explorer Captain James Cook in 1778, Kauaʻi and its surrounding islands became a popular destination for trade ships because of their convenient location in the Pacific Ocean. In addition, the Hawaiian King Kamehameha I unified the Hawaiian islands in 1810. These two factors signified a major shift in the economic structure of both Kauaʻi and its sister islands. For the first time, Kauaʻi shifted to a market economy with the introduction of money and international trade. The islands started exporting Sandalwood and trading with China for its tea. Hawaiians grew a liking to goods offered by Western countries and engaged in busy trade with both Europe and China. This lasted until the local forests on Kauai were stripped of all of its sandalwood.

In 1826, New England whaling ships began resupplying and getting fresh water in both Waimea and Koloa on Kauaʻi . Because the whaling economy was one of the most profitable trades for Western traders in the 19th century, Kauaʻi became a major re-provisioning and recreational center for trade ships.

By the 1850s, over 500 whaling ships were visiting Hawaii every year. This brought major trade and money flow to the islands until the industry's eventual decline due to the American Civil War through the 1860s.

== Sugarcane economy ==
Although sugarcane was already present in the Hawaiian island chain before Captain Cook's discovery, the first successful sugarcane plantation, in Koloa by Ladd and Company in 1835, was the beginning of the sugar boom in Kauaʻi . When the first plantation succeeded, it sparked interest from businessmen from all around the West. The first recorded sale of exported sugarcane was in 1837 when two tons were sold for $200.

Additionally, King Kamehameha III introduced the Great Mahele of 1848 which brought private ownership of land to Kauaʻi. Foreign land ownership was also now opened up which led to sugar plantations being spread from the West side of the island all the way to Princeville in the North. As sugarcane requires two thousand pounds of water to produce one pound of sugar, investors chose Kauaʻi and the other islands because of their year-round warm, sunny climate along with high rainfall due to trade winds carrying moisture across the islands.

Through the 1850s, sugar exports from Kauaʻi continued to grow to the United States. By 1852, thousands of Chinese immigrants were coming to the region to work on plantations, but was halted with the passage of the Chinese Exclusion Act in 1882 by the U.S. government. Sugar exports soared until the end of the American Civil War in 1865. U.S. tariffs on sugar meant a heavy drop in Hawaiian exports. The 20% to 42% tariffs between 1850 and 1870 meant the profit margin for sugar was greatly decreased for sugarcane plantations. However, the 1876 reciprocity treaty between the United States and Hawaii led to free-duty trade between the two.

The Kauaʻi County Government, established in 1905, opened the door for many modern developments in the region. Electricity, roads, airfields, and newspapers began to spring up throughout the island. However, immigrant workers that were involved in the cultivation, irrigation, and planting of sugarcane experienced declining wages and living conditions. Consequently, a failed Japanese-led sugarcane island-wide strike led to many Japanese workers leaving the plantations, and the island altogether. In 1924, rivalries between ethnic Filipino workers, plantation managers, and the Kauai police force led to 16 worker and 4 police officer deaths—the most violent labor-related incident in Kauai history.

The closing of two major sugarcane plantations, Kilauea and Grove Farm, signified the decline of the sugarcane industry's dominance in Kauaʻi.

== Tourism economy ==
The introduction of commercial jet flight to the Lihue Airport sparked the beginning of the tourism industry on Kauaʻi. Furthermore, Hawaii's acceptance as the 50th state in 1959 helped contribute to this new industry. Kaua’i Surf, a new ten-story hotel, was opened in 1960—solidifying Kauaʻi's commitment to tourism. The first McDonald's opened on the island in 1971 along with the first stoplight in 1973. Coco Palms, the most popular Kauaʻi resort at the time, was featured in Elvis Presley's "Blue Hawaii", which contributed to the growing popularization of the small tropical island. Native Hawaiians protested many of these changes, but the tourism industry did not slow down.

By 1970, nearly 426,000 tourists were visiting the island annually. By the end of that decade, the number rose to over 800,000 tourists. In addition, 80% of Kauaʻi's income was either indirectly or directly tied to tourism by the end of the 1980s. Most residents opposed this new economy as large traffic jams became a daily occurrence along with the large population increase on the island.

Hurricane ʻIniki caused catastrophic damage to the island in 1992. The destructive storm led to over $2 billion in damages to the island—including the demolition of Coco Palms. By 1993, Kauaʻi's tourism numbers halved. However, the island eventually recovered as infrastructure was rebuilt and popular Hollywood movies featured Kauaʻi as their settings, including many scenes in the Jurassic Park movies.

The island of Kauaʻi, along with the other islands, boasted record numbers for tourism in 2017. Arrivals to the island grew 7.8% along with a 5.8% increase in days stayed from 2016. Over 53% of the travelers stayed exclusively on Kauaʻi. Daily spending per tourist also increased by $4 to $188. In the year 2017, over 204,000 new jobs were created for the state of Hawaii—many directly or indirectly related to the tourism industry.

Kauaʻi's current economy is heavily dependent on tourism, with 19.6% of locals aged 16 and over work in hospitality and 10.8% in retail related work.

== See also ==
- Kauaʻi
- Outline of Hawaii
- Sugar Plantations in Hawaii
- Tourism in Hawaii
- Kauaʻi County, Hawaii
