= Kawelo =

Kawelo (meaning "the waving of the flag" in Hawaiian) is the name of line and or family of the Kauaian kings:

- Kawelomahamahaia (born c. 1630), chief of Kauai
- Kawelolauhuki, relative and probably daughter of Kawelomahamahaia, and Queen Consort of Oahu
- Kawelomakualua (born c. 1655), chief of Kauaʻi
- Kaweloaikanaka (born c. 1680), chief of Kauaʻi
- Kawelo a Maihunaliʻi (fl. c. 1700), chief of Kauaʻi, and the most regarded warrior king in the legends
- Kawelookalani (died c. March 1823), half-brother of Kamehameha I
