= Aikana =

Aikana may refer to:

- Aikanã people, an ethnic group of Brazil
- Aikanã language, a language of Brazil

== See also ==
- Aikanaka (disambiguation)
