= Wailua Homesteads, Hawaii =

Wailua Homesteads
- Census-designated place
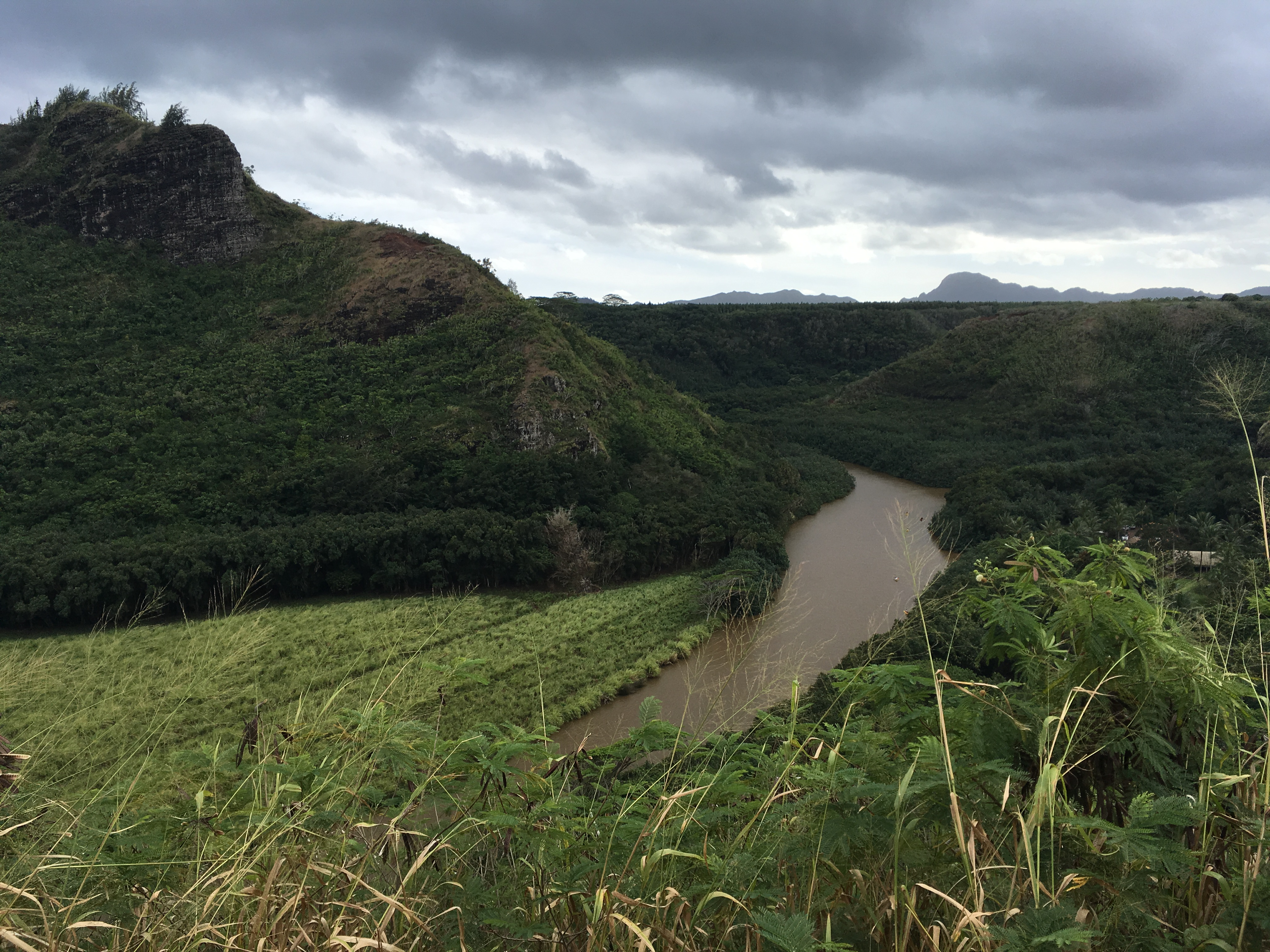
- River valley in Wailua Homesteads

- Location in Kauaʻi County and the state of Hawaii
- Coordinates: 22°3′52″N 159°23′2″W
- Country: United States
- State: Hawaii
- County: Kauaʻi

Area
  - Total: 7.41 sq mi (19.19 km^{2})
  - Land: 7.31 sq mi (18.92 km^{2})
  - Water: 0.10 sq mi (0.26 km^{2})
- Elevation: 360 ft (110 m)

Population (2020)
  - Total: 5,863
  - Density: 802.5/sq mi (309.84/km^{2})
- Time zone: UTC-10 (Hawaii-Aleutian)
- Area code: 808
- FIPS code: 15-77225

Wailua Homesteads is a census-designated place (CDP) in Kauaʻi County, Hawaii. The population was 5,863 at the 2020 census, up from 4,567 at the 2000 census.

== Geography ==
Wailua Homesteads is located on the eastern side of the island of Kauaʻi at 22°3′52″N 159°23′2″W (22.064507, -159.383875). It is bordered to the north by Kapaa, to the east by Wailua, and to the south by the Wailua River and its north fork.

According to the United States Census Bureau, the CDP has a total area of 7.4 square miles (19.2 km^{2}), of which 7.3 square miles (18.9 km^{2}) are land and 0.1 square miles (0.3 km^{2}), or 1.38%, are water.

== Demographics ==
Historical population
Census	Pop.	Note	%±
2020	5,863		—
U.S. Decennial Census

=== 2020 census ===
As of the 2020 census, Wailua Homesteads had a population of 5,863. The median age was 44.5 years. 20.1% of residents were under the age of 18 and 23.8% of residents were 65 years of age or older. For every 100 females there were 98.5 males, and for every 100 females age 18 and over there were 96.9 males age 18 and over.

87.9% of residents lived in urban areas, while 12.1% lived in rural areas.

There were 2,097 households in Wailua Homesteads, of which 33.6% had children under the age of 18 living in them. Of all households, 50.9% were married-couple households, 16.6% were households with a male householder and no spouse or partner present, and 23.3% were households with a female householder and no spouse or partner present. About 20.4% of all households were made up of individuals and 9.8% had someone living alone who was 65 years of age or older.

There were 2,213 housing units, of which 5.2% were vacant. The homeowner vacancy rate was 0.9% and the rental vacancy rate was 2.3%.

Racial composition as of the 2020 census
Race	Number	Percent
White	2,542	43.4%
Black or African American	32	0.5%
American Indian and Alaska Native	26	0.4%
Asian	995	17.0%
Native Hawaiian and Other Pacific Islander	479	8.2%
Some other race	138	2.4%
Two or more races	1,651	28.2%
Hispanic or Latino (of any race)	627	10.7%

=== 2000 census ===
As of the census of 2000, there were 4,567 people, 1,655 households, and 1,189 families residing in the CDP. The population density was 648.6 inhabitants per square mile (250.4/km^{2}). There were 1,758 housing units at an average density of 249.7 per square mile (96.4/km^{2}). The racial makeup of the CDP was 39.9% White, 0.4% African American, 0.4% Native American, 24.3% Asian, 7.9% Pacific Islander, 1.0% from other races, and 26.1% from two or more races. Hispanic or Latino of any race were 8.8% of the population.

There were 1,655 households, out of which 35.5% had children under the age of 18 living with them, 56.6% were married couples living together, 10.3% had a female householder with no husband present, and 28.1% were non-families. 19.6% of all households were made up of individuals, and 4.1% had someone living alone who was 65 years of age or older. The average household size was 2.72 and the average family size was 3.14.

In the CDP the population was spread out, with 26.3% under the age of 18, 6.2% from 18 to 24, 26.7% from 25 to 44, 32.0% from 45 to 64, and 8.8% who were 65 years of age or older. The median age was 40 years. For every 100 females there were 101.7 males. For every 100 females age 18 and over, there were 99.6 males.

The median income for a household in the CDP was $48,047, and the median income for a family was $53,558. Males had a median income of $35,469 versus $26,827 for females. The per capita income for the CDP was $23,675. About 7.7% of families and 8.9% of the population were below the poverty line, including 13.3% of those under age 18 and 3.7% of those age 65 or over.
