= Apukohai =

Marine monster in the mythology of the island of Kauai, Hawaii

Apukohai is a marine monster in the mythology of the island of Kauaʻi. Kawelo, a giant of enormous strength, departs for Oʻahu and encounters Apukohai. After a fierce struggle, Kawelo kills Apukohai, having invoked the assistance of the owl god and the fish Ulu-makaikai (Beckwith 1970: 409–411).

== See also ==
- Sherman's Lagoon - In a series of comics, Apukohai is represented as a guy with a huge Tiki mask who fires lightning bolts (and his kitchen sink) from the clouds. Kahuna refers to him as a "tough nut."
