= Makaleha Mountains =

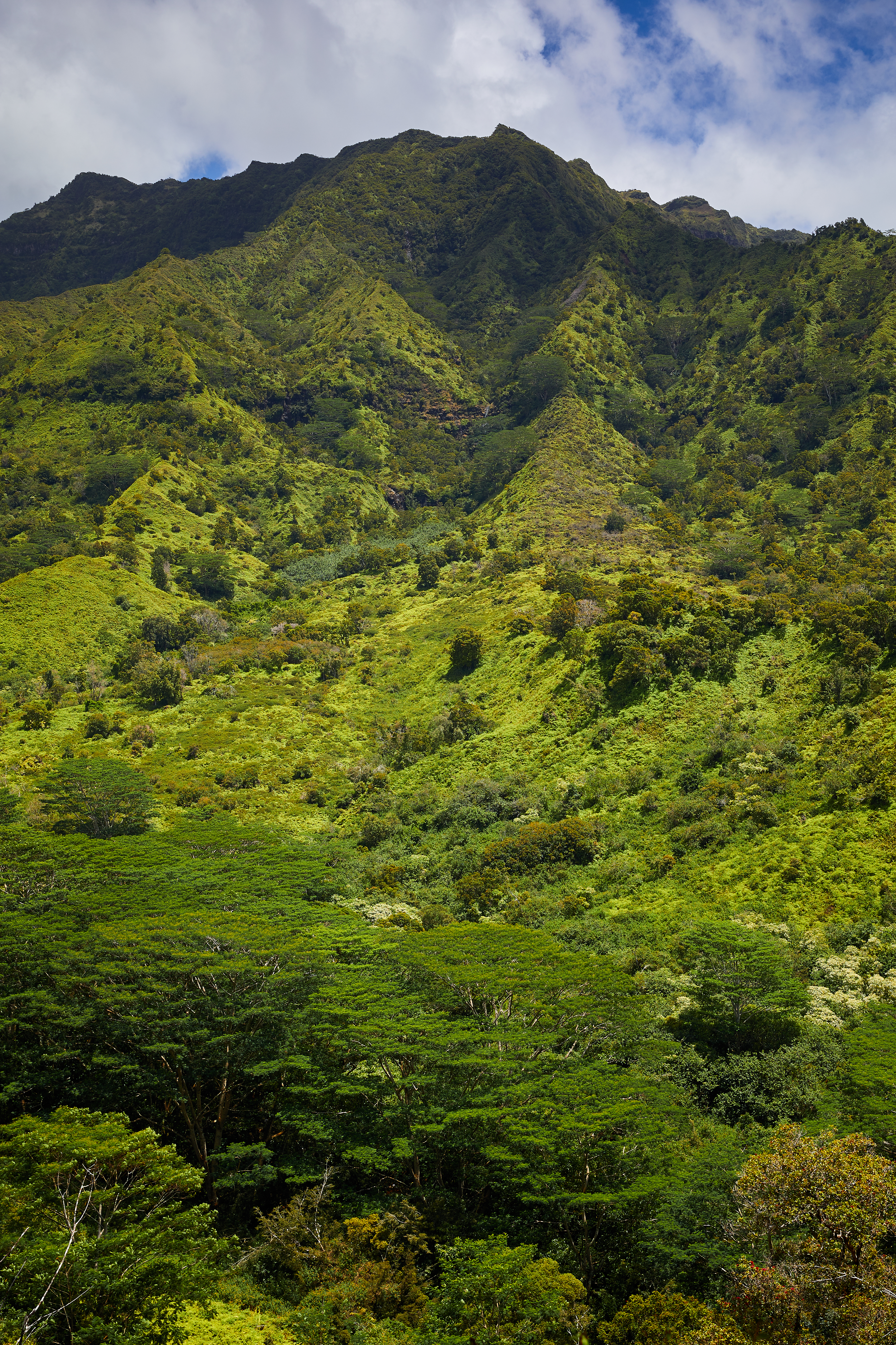
- Makalea Mountains as seen from Moalepe Trail (2018 photograph)

Highest point
- Elevation: 3,215 ft (980 m)

Geography
- Country: United States
- State: Hawaii
- Range coordinates: 22°7′N 159°25′W

The Makaleha Mountains (pronounced Hawaiian pronunciation: [ˈmɐkəˈlɛhə] or Hawaiian pronunciation: [ˈmɐtəˈlɛhə] in Hawaiian) are a mountain range in Kauaʻi County on the eastern side of the Hawaiian island of Kauaʻi. The highest point is approximately 3,215 feet (980 meters) above sea level.

The derivation of the place name Makaleha is the Hawaiian word makaleha (from maka "eye" and leha "to lift up") meaning "to wonder at; to admire" or "to lift the eyebrows, as in wonder or admiration".

Makaleha pritchardia or Pritchardia hardyi is an endangered species of Arecaceae palm tree that is endemic to Hawaiian tropical rainforests on Kauaʻi. In 1998 only 30 individuals remained in the wild along Powerline Trail between Wailua and Princeville.
