= Wailua Falls =

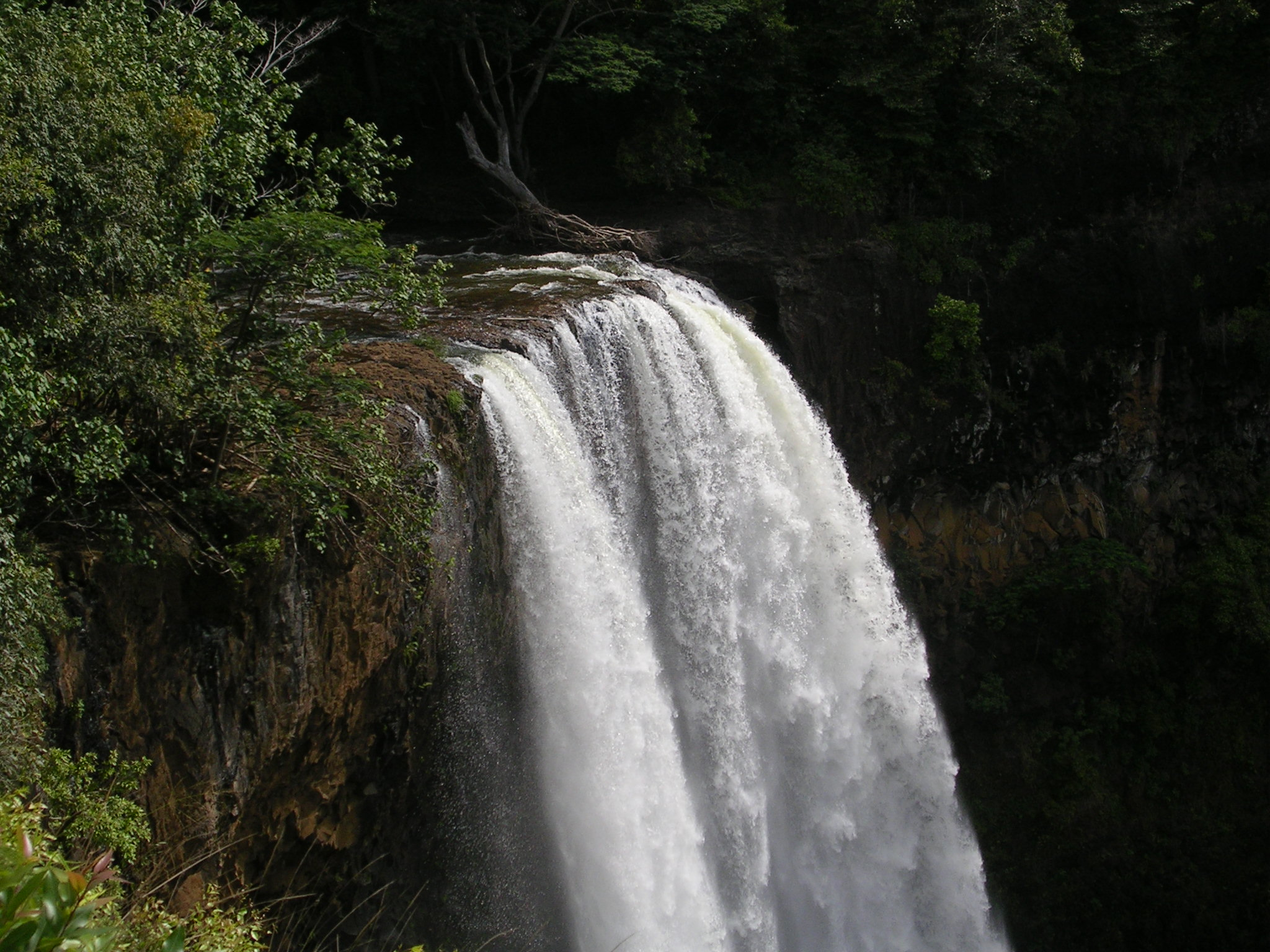
- A view from the top of Wailua Falls
- Interactive map of Wailua Falls
- Location: Wailua River State Park on Kauai, Hawaii
- Coordinates: 22°02′04″N 159°22′43″W
- Type: Plunge
- Total height: 84 feet (26 m)
- Number of drops: 2
- Watercourse: South Fork Wailua River

Wailua Falls is a waterfall on the island of Kauai, part of the US state of Hawaii. The 173 foot (52.7 m) falls are located on the South Fork Wailua River near Lihue. The waterfall is prominently featured on the opening credits of the television series Fantasy Island.

There are paths to the bottom of the falls, but it is often muddy and slippery. The "trail" further from the parking lot is less steep than the closer one. In ancient times, Hawaiian men would jump from the top of the falls to prove their manhood. Some people still leap off the top of the falls, though it is dangerous and illegal. In 2016, a man jumped from the falls and was knocked unconscious but narrowly avoided death when someone swam out into the pool to save him. The pool is great for swimming, but there are swift currents close to the waterfall. There is another waterfall nearby named 'Opaeka'a Falls.

== See also ==
- ʻŌpaekaʻa Falls
- List of waterfalls
- List of Hawaii waterfalls
