= Kawelo a Maihunaliʻi =

Kawelo a Maihunaliʻi (sometimes written Kawelo-a-Maihunaliʻi), also known as Kaweloleimakau (or Kawelolei-makau), was the usurping aliʻi nui (supreme monarch) of Kauai, who overthrew Kaweloaikanaka and the old hereditary line of Kauai rulers.

== Birth and early life ==
Kawelo a Maihunaliʻi was born in Hanamaulu, an important part of Lihue, Kauai, to his father, Maihunaliʻi and mother, Malaiakalani. He had two brothers named Kawelomahamahaia and Kaweloleikoo as well as two sisters named Kaenakuokalani and the youngest of the five children named Kamalama, Kawelo being born just before her.

Just after the birth of his sister Kamalama, Kawelo moved to Wailua with his grandparents and was raised with ʻAikanaka, son of the ruling monarch of Kauai at the time, and Kauahoe of Hanalei. As a young boy Kawelo overate. In order to occupy him, his grandparents encouraged activities such as canoeing. His competitiveness would develop while playing games and other activities with Kauahoe, who Kawelo began to see as inferior to himself in many ways. The two boys were closely related but ʻAikanaka was always considered the superior of the three and always given his way in all things.

== Expulsion and period on Oahu ==
ʻAikanaka, also known as Kaweloaikanaka, was one of two twin sons who had become monarch of the Island of Kauai after the death of his father, Kawelomakualua. His only family appears to have been his twin brother Kaweloapeekoa and his wife Naki. Sometime after becoming monarch, ʻAikanaka expelled his cousin and drove him of the island. Kawelo took refuge on the island of Oahu at Ewa under the rule of Kaʻihikapu a Kākuhihewa or his sons. He was given lands in the Waianae Mountains near what was called the Kole-kole Pass. The first known oral reference to Waianae begin with Kū a Nuʻuanu an aliʻi ʻaimoku (ruler of a district) and his son Naʻili during the 18th century. From about 1700 to 1720, Kawelo a Maihunaliʻi is associated with a heiau by the shore in the Kamaile area.

At some point the grandparents went to live at Waikiki on the Island of Oahu, along with Kawelo where his two older brothers were already established. Kākuhihewa (which of the three rulers of that name is not given) was the aliʻi nui of Oahu at the time. Kawelo took a wife named Kanewahineikiaoha, a daughter of Kalonaikahailaau of the Koolau families on Oahu.

His two older brothers would spend the day surfing and wrestling with a notable wrestling master and others on the beach. Kawelo could hear the loud cheering of the young men and asked to join them but was told no by his grandparents. So the next day he snuck off without permission and joined his older brothers surfing and wrestling on the beach with the stronger master.

== Bibliography ==
- Bishop Museum (1919). Memoirs of the Bernice Pauahi Bishop Museum of Polynesian Ethnology and Natural History. Bishop Museum Press. ISBN 978-1333188733. OCLC 1772065.
- Fornander, Abraham (1880). An Account of the Polynesian Race: Its Origins and Migrations, and the Ancient History of the Hawaiian People to the Times of Kamehameha I. Trubner & Company. p. 294. ISBN 978-1148488134. OCLC 4807.
- Hommon, Robert J. (2013). The Ancient Hawaiian State: Origins of a Political Society. OUP USA. doi:10.1093/acprof:oso/9780199916122.001.0001. ISBN 978-0-19-991612-2.
- Johnson, Rubellite Kawena (1981). Kumulipo, the Hawaiian Hymn of Creation. Ku Pa'a Publishing. ISBN 978-0-914916-53-6. OCLC 9620228.
- Copeland, Georgia (2001). Pacific 2000: proceedings of the fifth International Conference on Easter Island and the Pacific : Hawai'i Preparatory Academy, Hamuela, Hawaii, August 7-17, 2002. Bearsville Press. ISBN 978-1880636183.
