= Wailua River State Park =

State park on the island of Kauai, in Hawaii, United States

- Wailua Complex of Heiaus
- U.S. National Register of Historic Places
- U.S. National Historic Landmark District
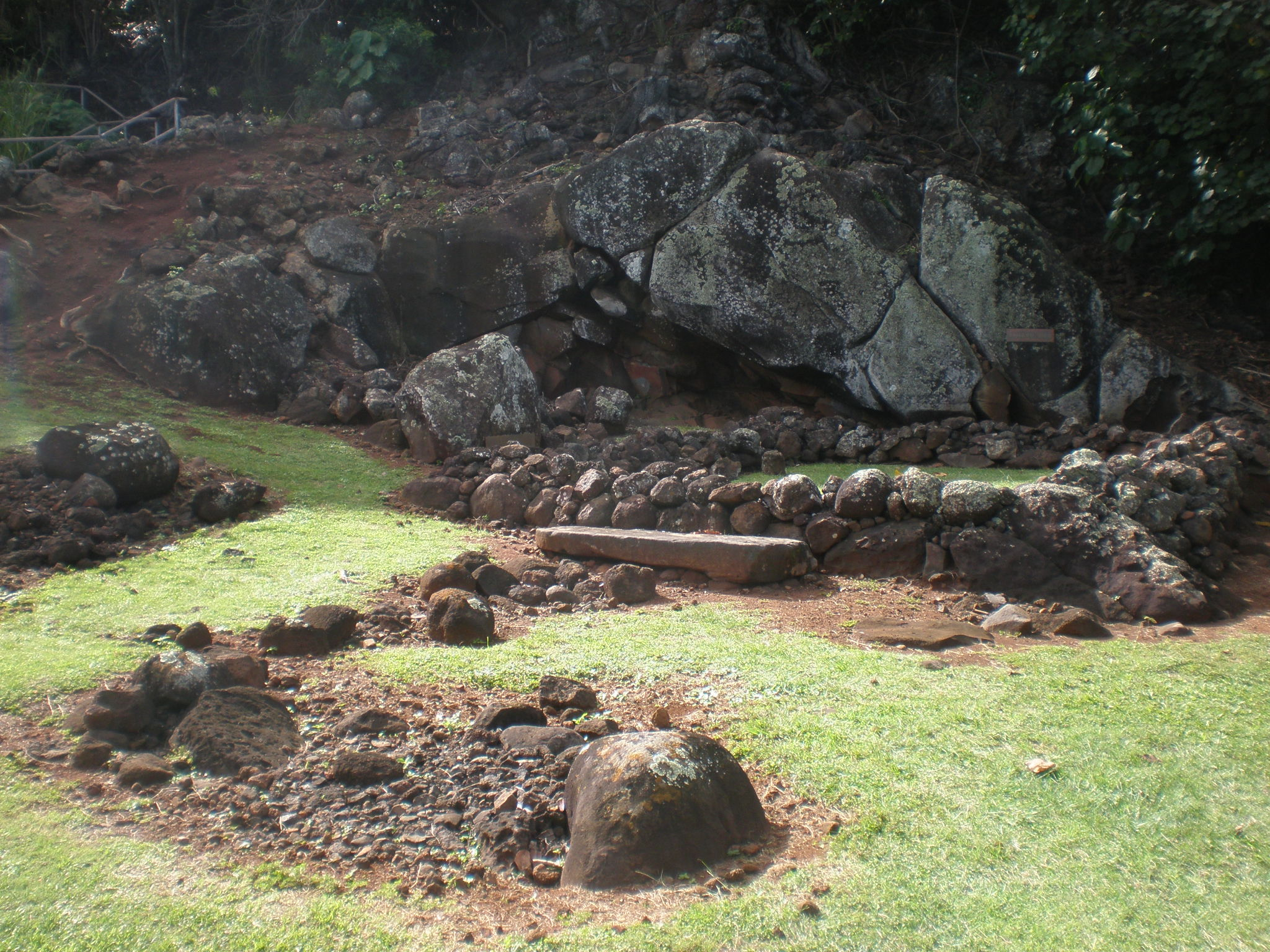
- Pōhaku Hoʻohānau (birthing stone) and Pōhaku Piko (umbilical stone), Holoholokū Heiau

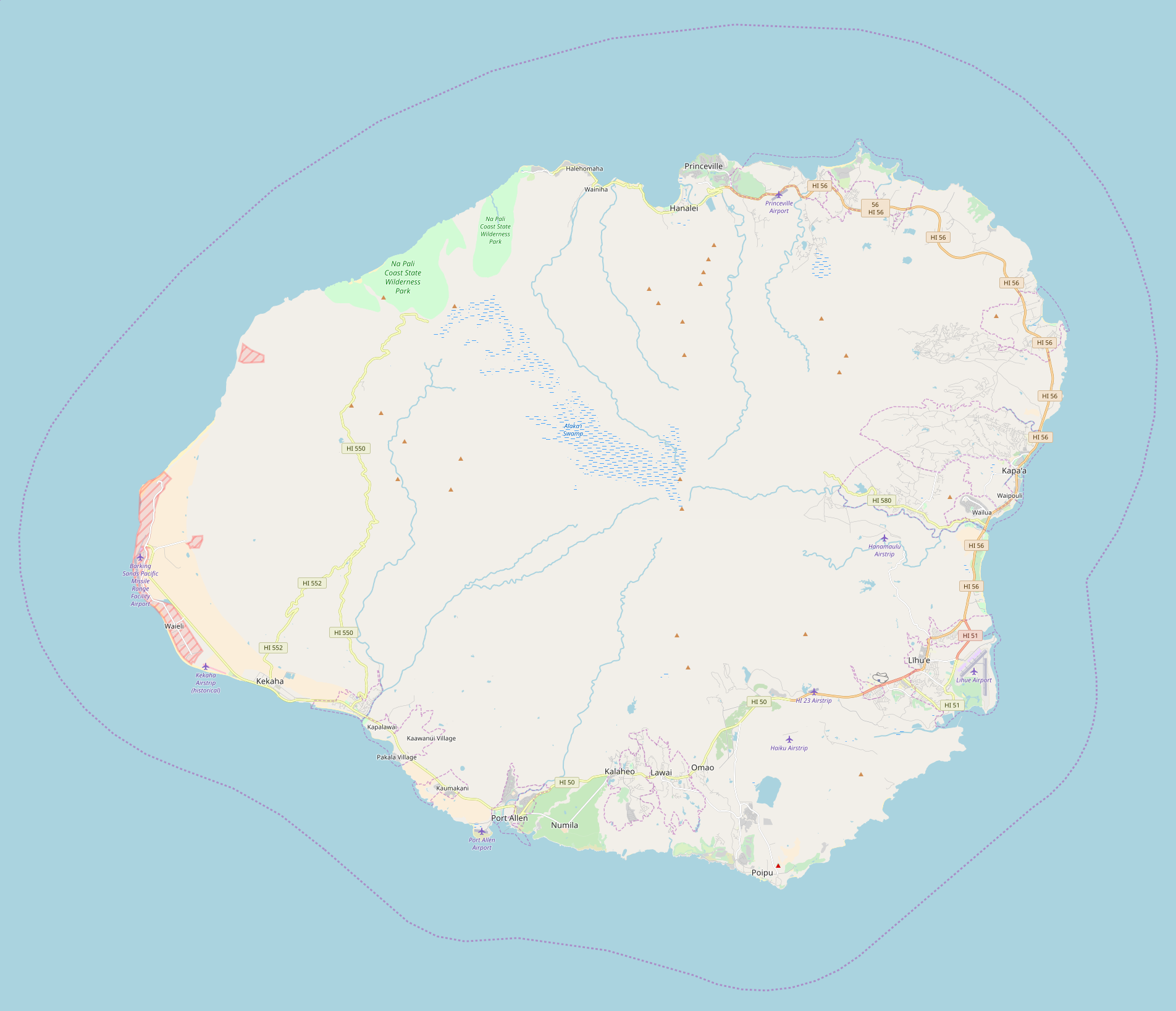
- Location within Kauai Location within Hawaii
- Nearest city: Wailua, Hawaii
- Coordinates: 22°2′41″N 159°20′14″W
- NRHP reference No.: 66000297

Significant dates
- Added to NRHP: October 15, 1966
- Designated NHLD: December 29, 1962

Wailua River State Park and the Wailua Complex of Heiaus, which it includes, are located on the eastern side of the Hawaiian island of Kauai. The park consists primarily of the Wailua River valley, which is the only navigable river in Hawaii. Visitors to this park can kayak, take riverboat cruises and explore the rainforest. Even motorboats and water skiing are permissible on the river.

== Wailua Complex of Heiaus ==
The Wailua Complex of Heiau, a National Historic Landmark, was once the center of chiefly power on the island. It contains the remains of several important structures: places of worship (heiau), places of refuge (puʻuhonua), and sites related to royal births. The historical value of these sites are irreplaceable to the Hawaiian culture. They worked with each other, and other heiau on other islands, such as Puʻu O Mahuka Heiau on the island of Oʻahu. The most important sites are:

- Hikinaakalā (Rising of the Sun) Heiau, which includes the Hauola place of refuge (puʻuhonua) and the Ka Pae Kiʻi Mahu O Wailua ancient petroglyphs, is located at the mouth of the Wailua river adjacent to Lydgate State Park. Legend says that ancient Kauaʻi ruler, Ola, asked the menehune to build this heiau and name it Hauola, after his father's city of refuge in Kekaha, Kauaʻi. It was constructed prior to 1200 AD. This heiau is tied to Puʻu O Mahuka Heiau and other Polynesian islands.
- Malae, also known as Malaea or Makaukiu or Mana Heiau, was a walled and paved luakini (sacrificial) heiau totalling a little over two acres. It is currently the largest heiau on Kauaʻi, after the destruction of Kuhiau Heiau at Kalapaki. Kuhiau Heiau had a companion heiau that was used in tandem by Kahuna (native doctors/scientists) in its heyday, and so did Malae Heiau. The companion of Malae Heiau was Poliahu Heiau, that sits on a northern bluff across Wailua River.
- Holoholokū Heiau, also known as Kalaeokamanu, adjacent to the pōhaku hoʻohānau (birthing stone) and pōhaku piko (navel/umbilical stone), where women of high rank would give birth and bury their afterbirth and umbilical cords. This heiau is the oldest heiau on Kauaʻi, built well before 1200 AD, and was the site of the first sacrifice. Just like Hikinaʻakalā Heiau and Hauola, Holoholokū has associations with other Polynesian islands. Originally included an ancient cemetery and coconut grove for an area totalling over thirteen acres, today it is classified as less than an acre.
- Poliʻahu (also spelled Poliahu) Heiau, a walled and paved large luakini heiau, over one acre, high on the narrow ridge between ʻŌpaekaʻa Stream and Wailua River. It had a view of other heiau in the complex, and its companion Malae heiau especially, was in plain view. Poliahu Heiau, Wailua Bellstone, Holoholokū Heiau, Pohaku Hoʻohanau, and Pohaku Piko are all in the vicinity of Puʻuki Ridge and are also a part of Poliahu State Park.
- Bellstone (on the same Puʻuki ridge), used to announce important events, such as royal births, a royal procession approaching, or war canoes are entering Wailua Bay. It was believed to have been destroyed in ancient Hawaiian times but it was photographed in 1988 by Helene Dunbar.
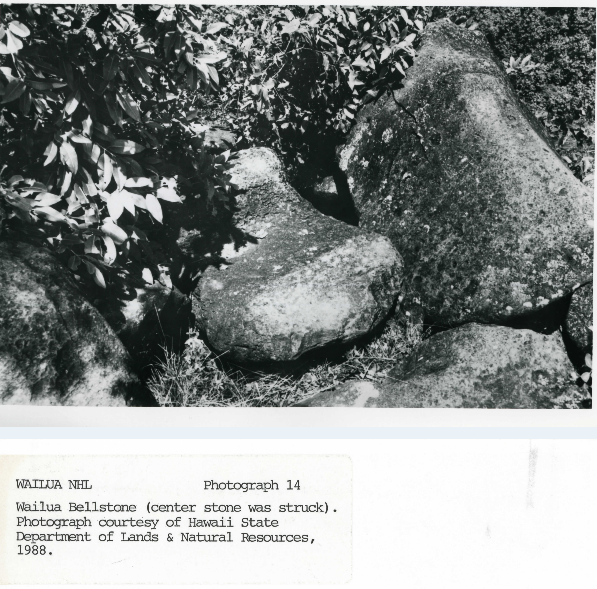
  1988 photograph of the historical, culturally significant Bellstone of the Wailua Complex of Heiau. This is not located at the Kauaʻi Museum.

Of these, only Holoholokū has been largely restored.

=== Heiau images ===
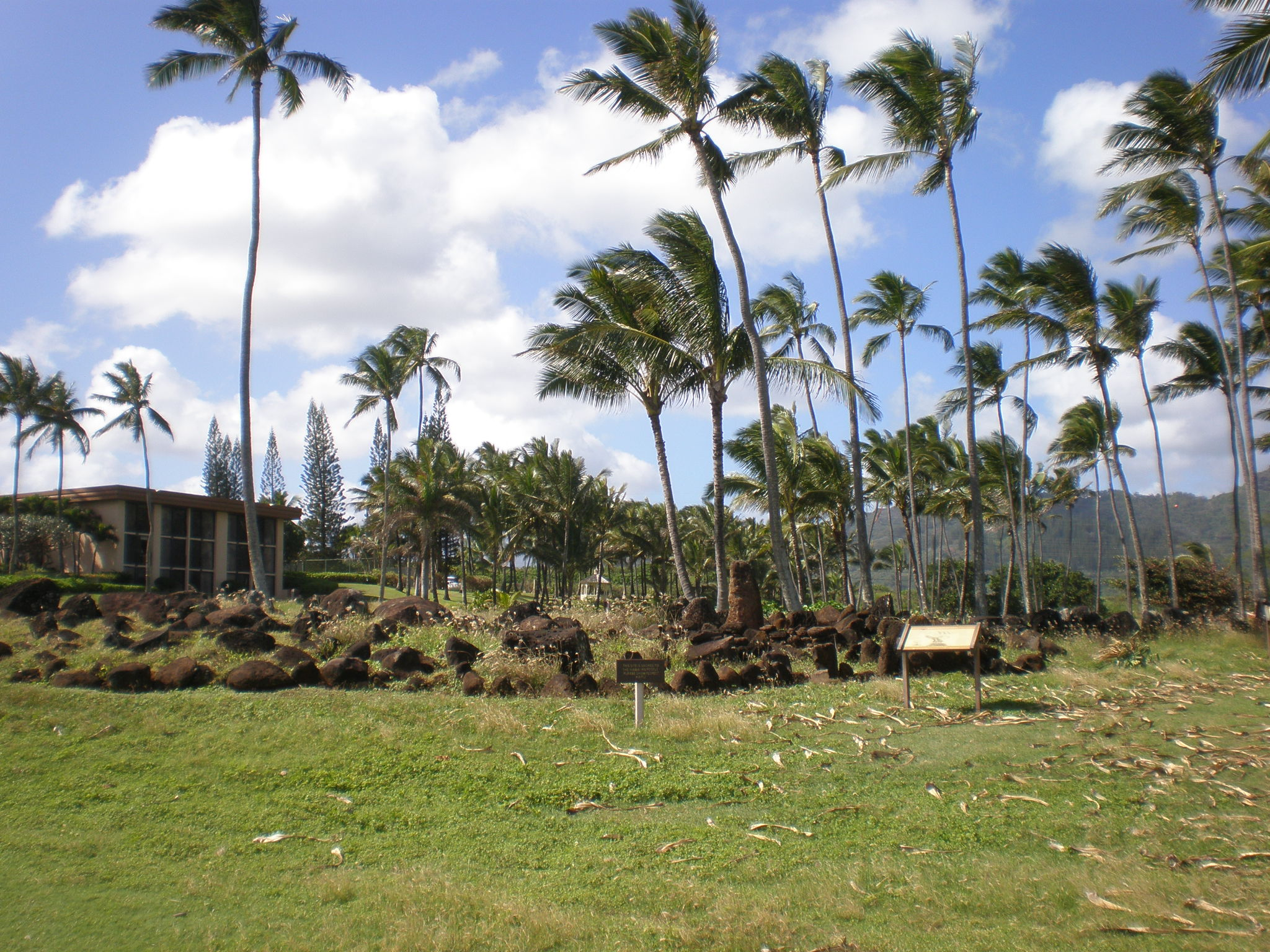
Hikinaakalā Heiau

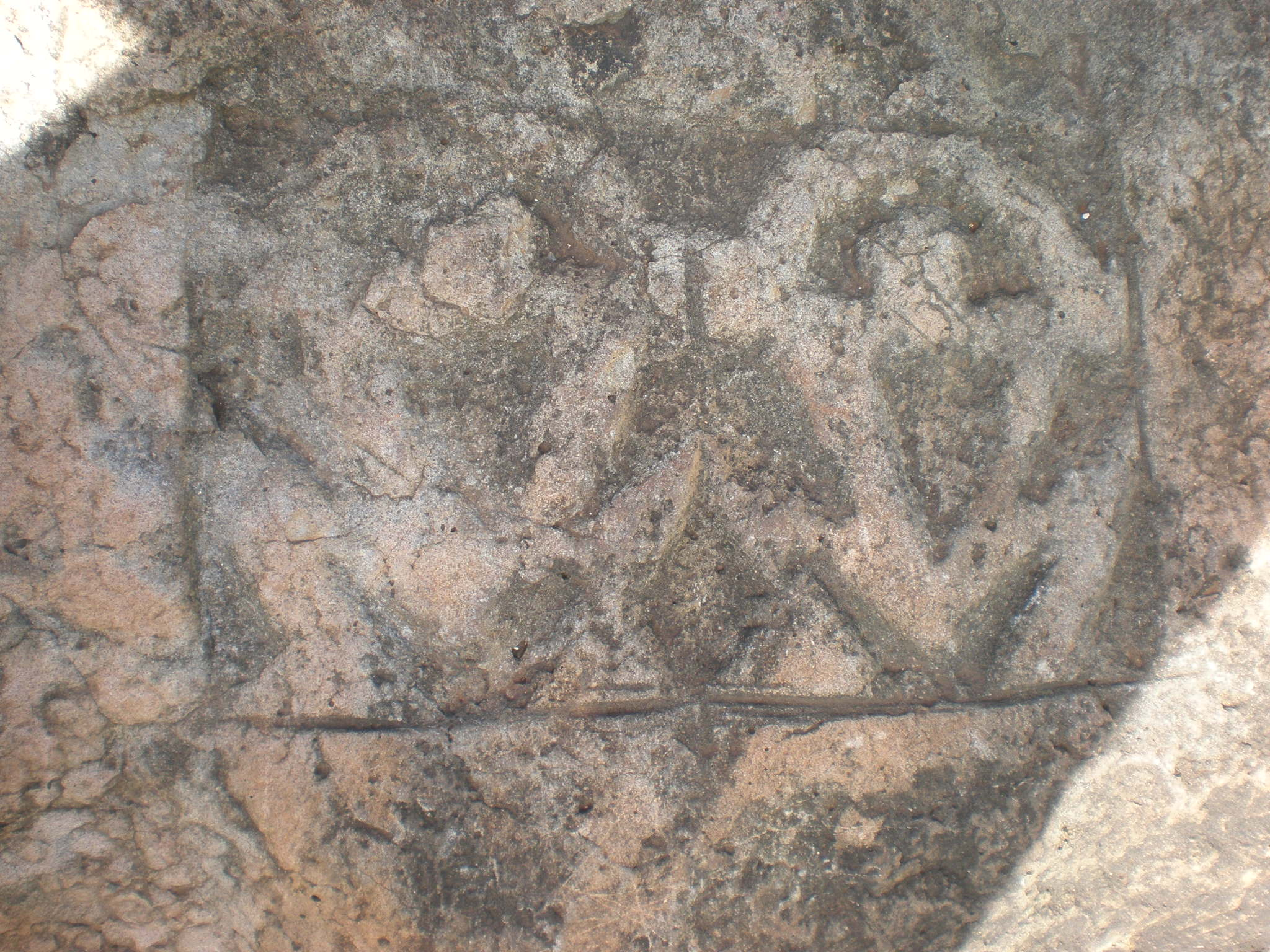
Kiʻi Pōhaku image

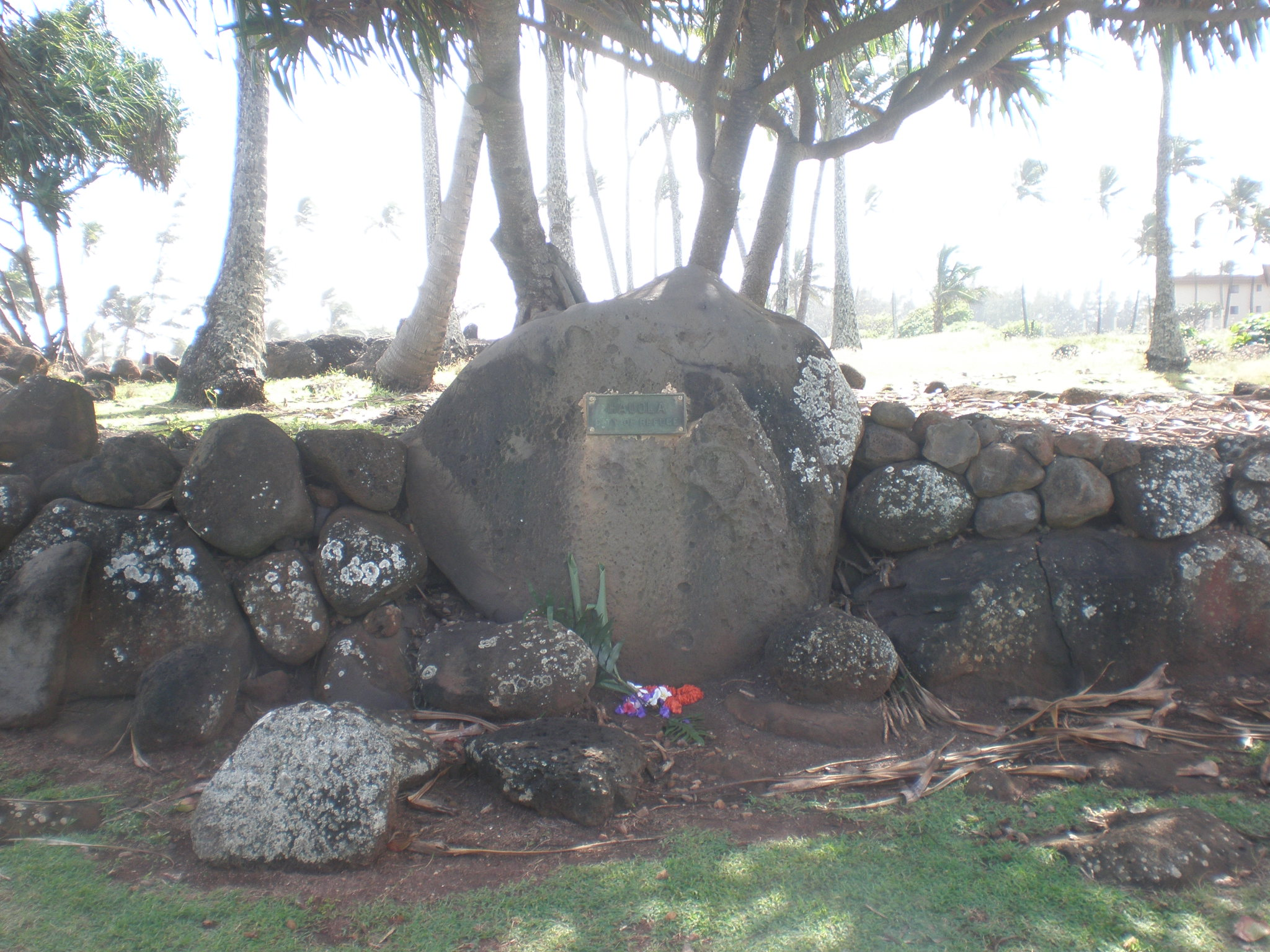
Hauola Heiau altar

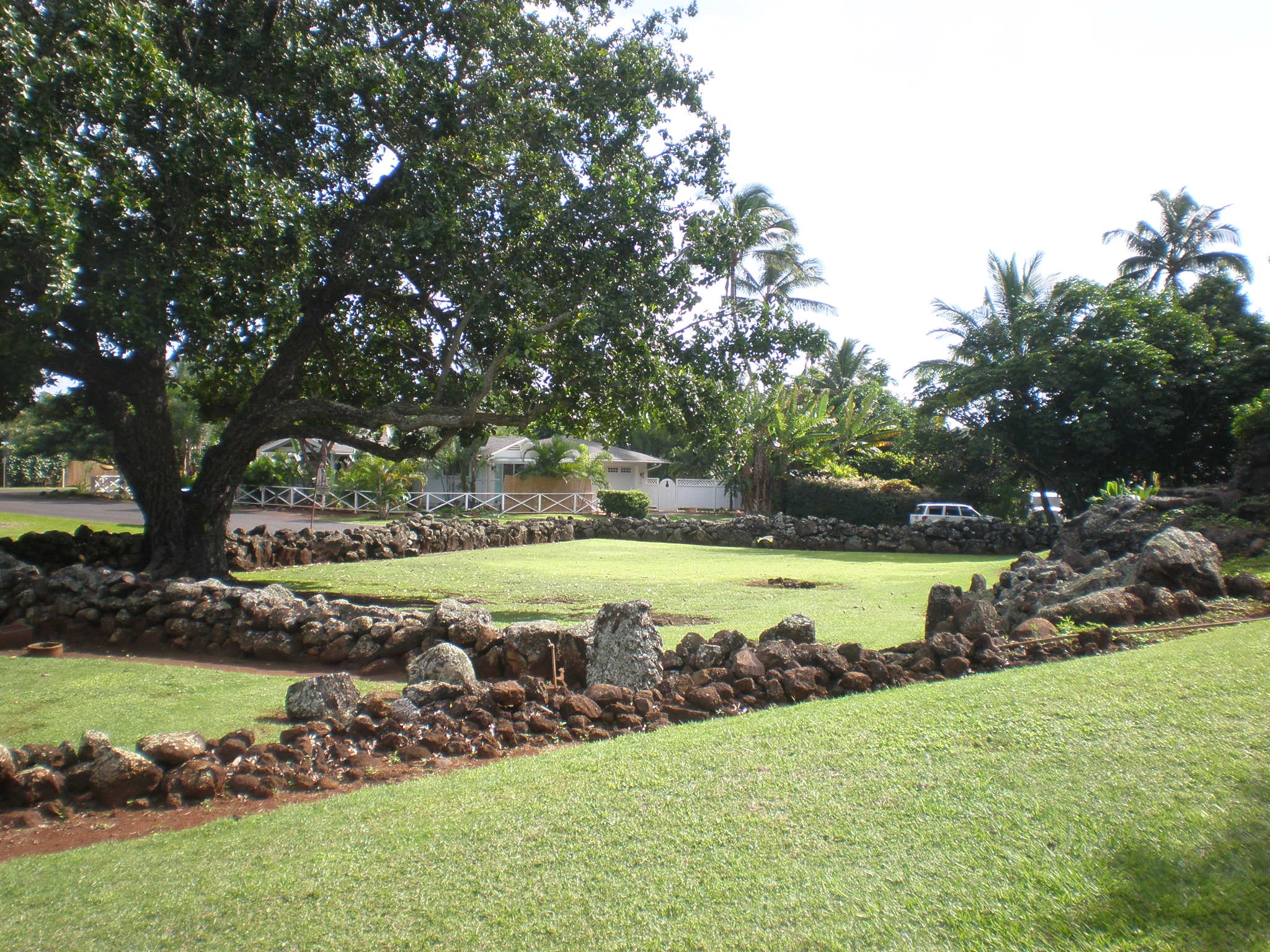
Ka Lae O Ka Manu Heiau (from near birthing stones)

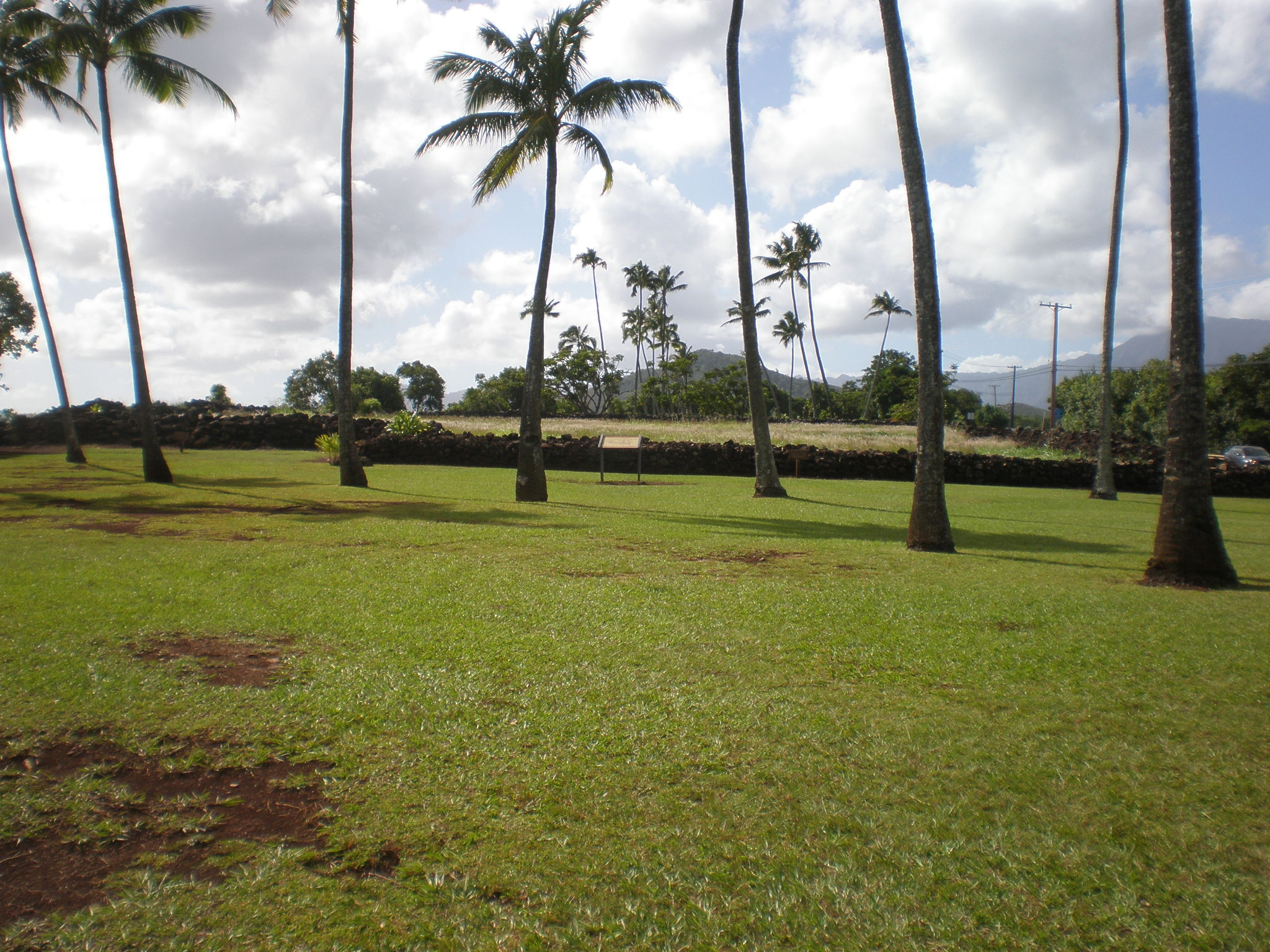
Poliʻahu Heiau (looking inland)

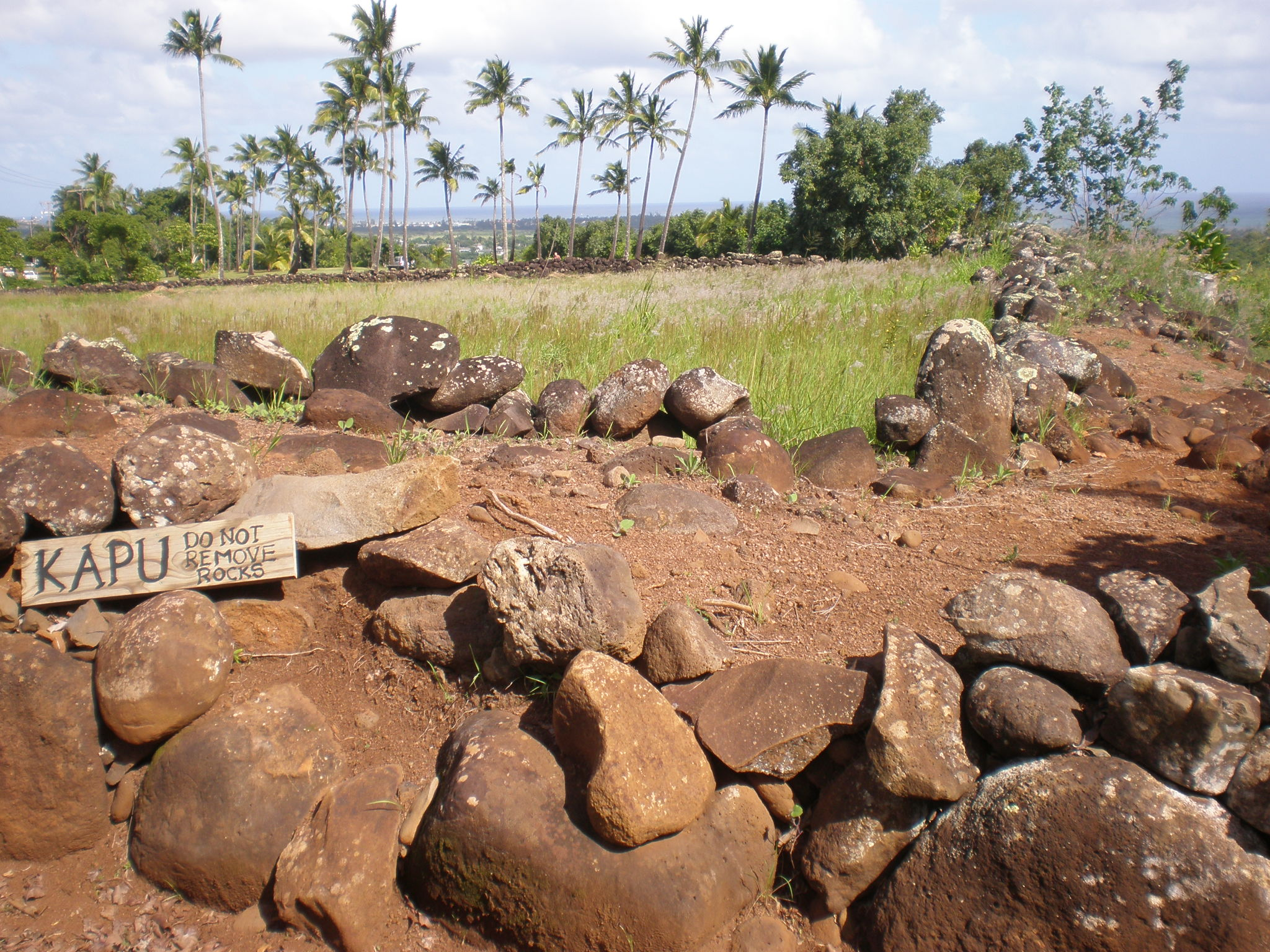
Poliʻahu Heiau (looking seaward)

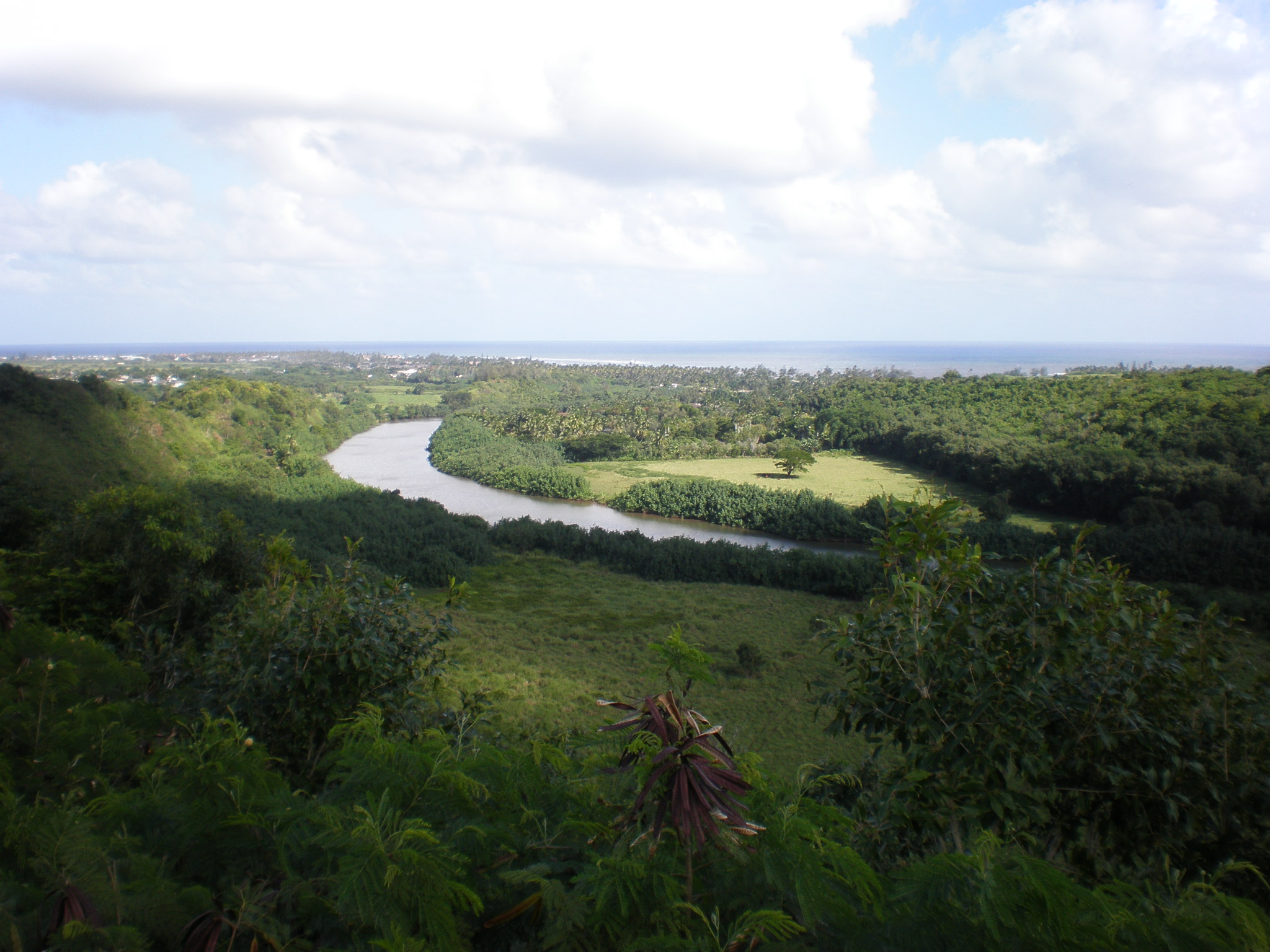
Poliʻahu Heiau view of Wailua River mouth and Malae Heiau hillside

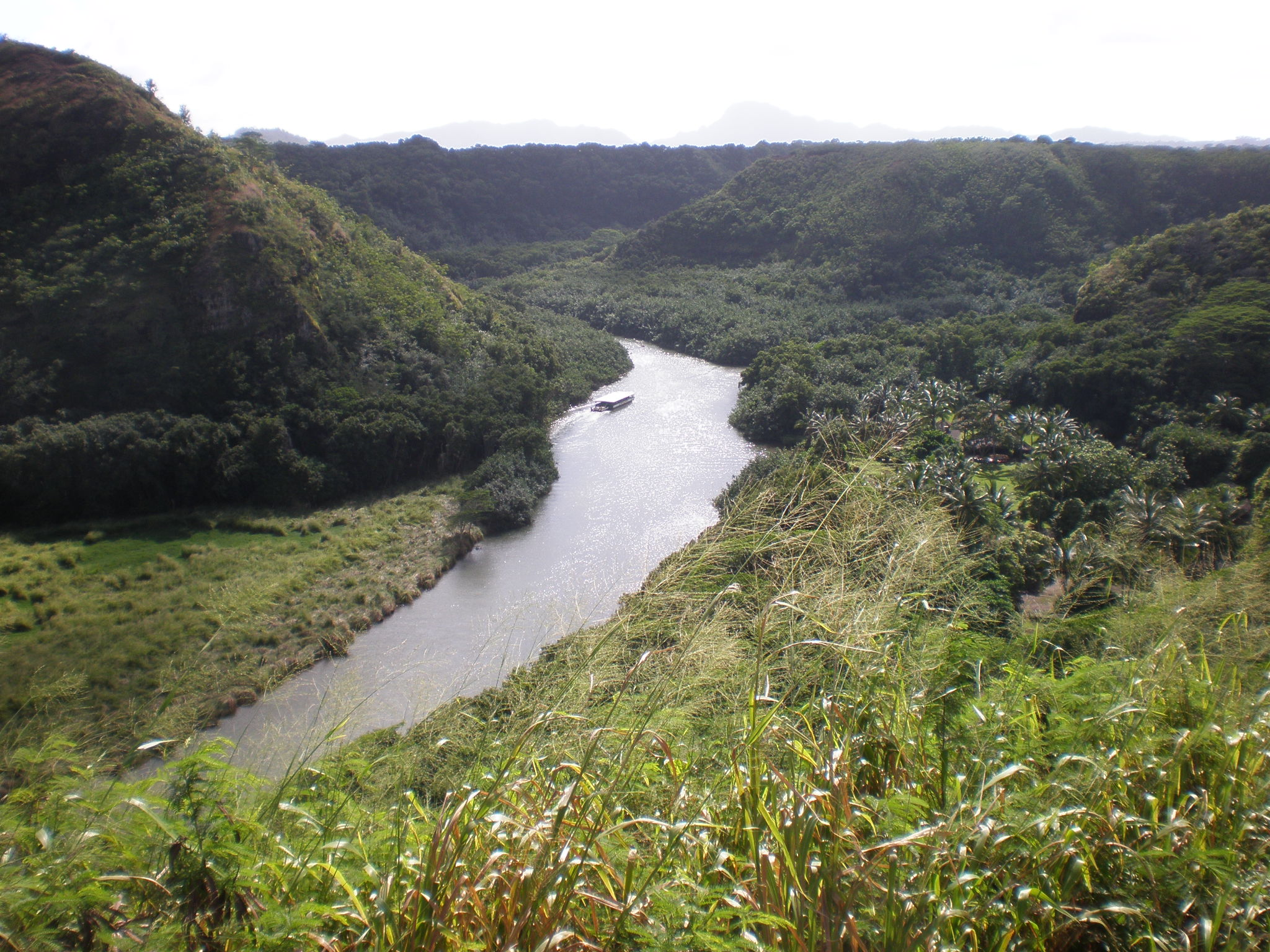
Poliʻahu Heiau view of Wailua River, Kamokila Hawaiian Village (at right), and Fern Grotto tour boat

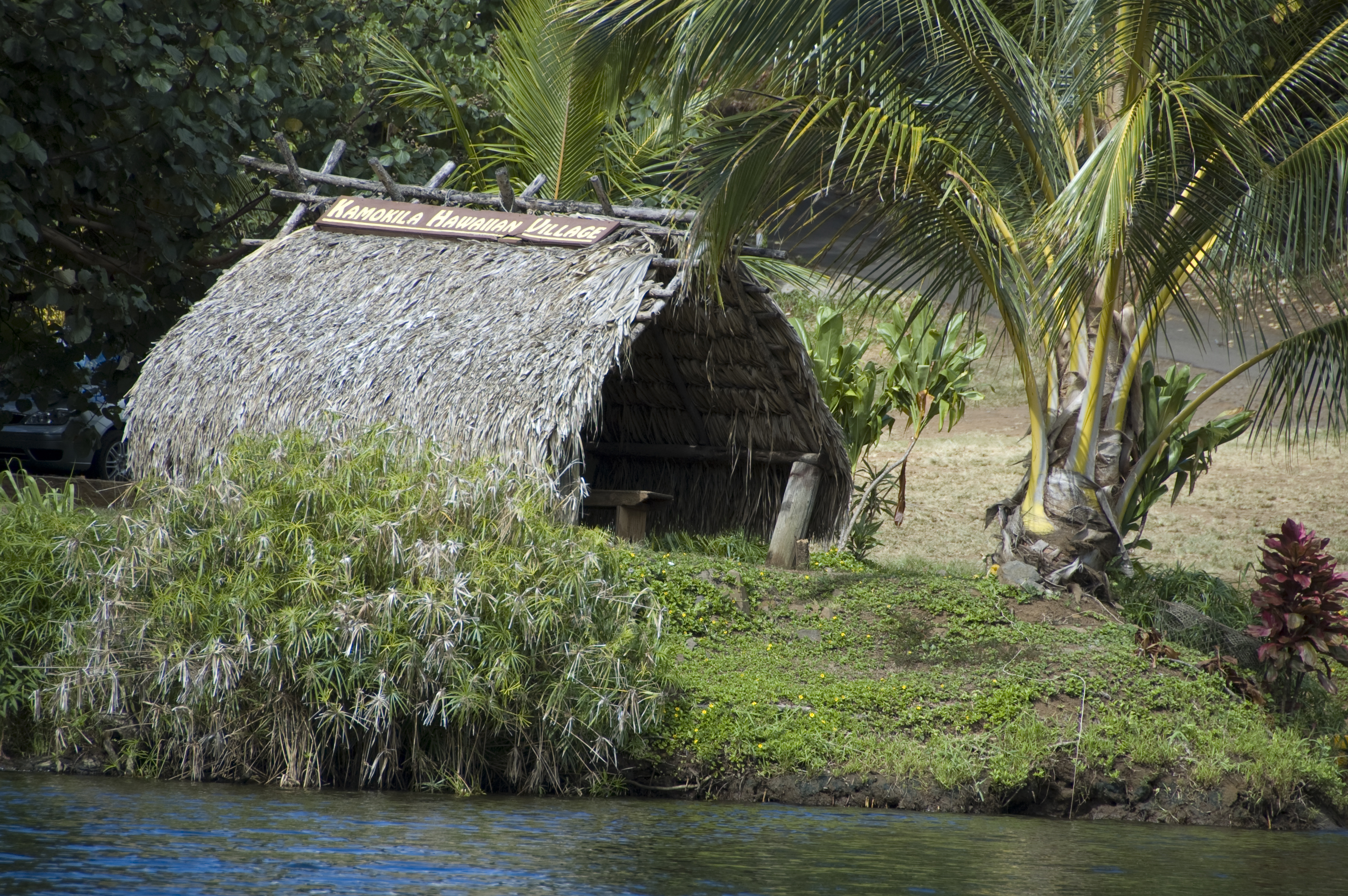
Kamokila Hawaiian Village

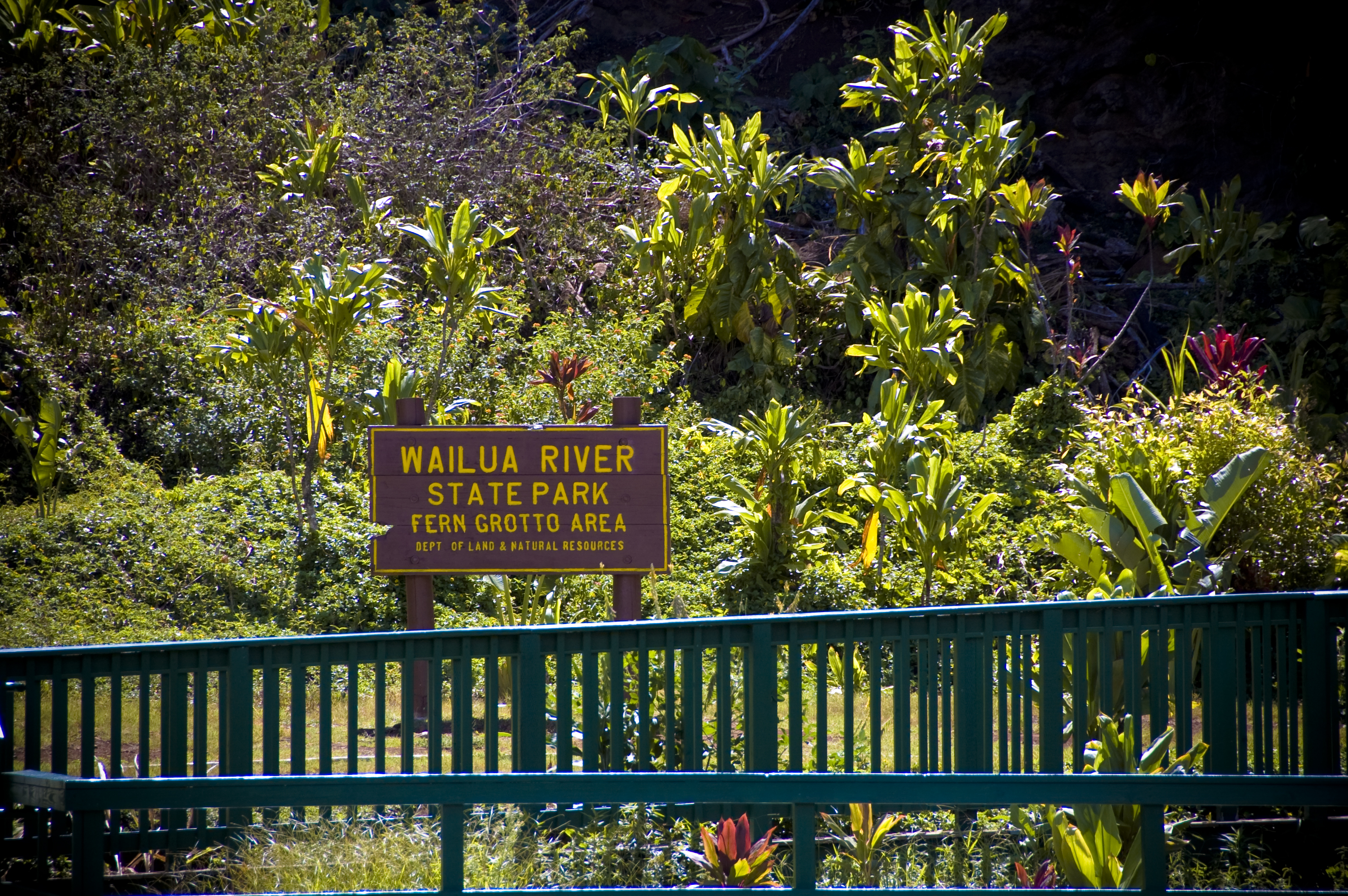
Fern Grotto

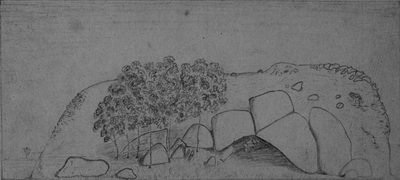
Sketch by Hiram Bingham I

== History ==
Wailua was the land of the ali'i (kings) and was one of the largest ahupuaʻa (subdivisions) on Kauai. It is said that King Kaumuali'i's favorite place to live was in Wailua. The huaka'i po (Ghost Warriors) are said to walk ancient trails along the river at night up to Mount Waiʻaleʻale. Wailua has many moʻo ʻōlelo (ancient stories) of the area that begins at Hikinaʻakalā heiau to Kaʻawakoʻo atop Mount Waiʻaleʻale, the area long known as the King's highway, and it is still very sacred to many Hawaiians.

== See also ==
- List of Hawaiian state parks
- Smith Family Garden Luau
