= Fern Grotto =

Cave in Hawaii

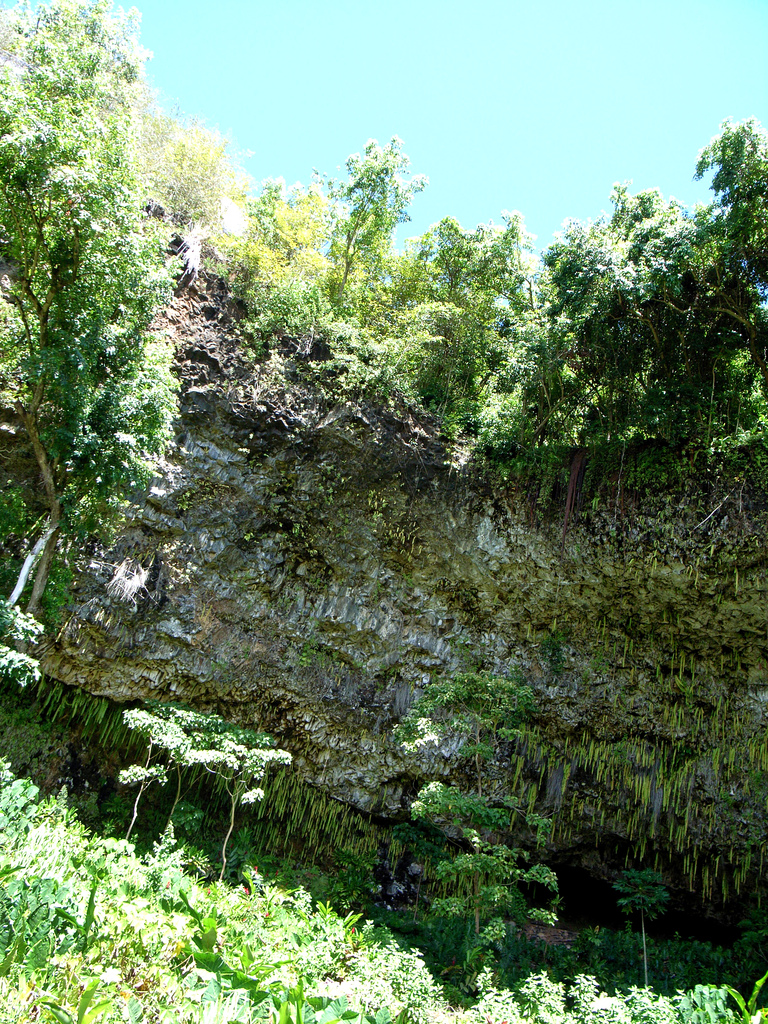
Fern Grotto

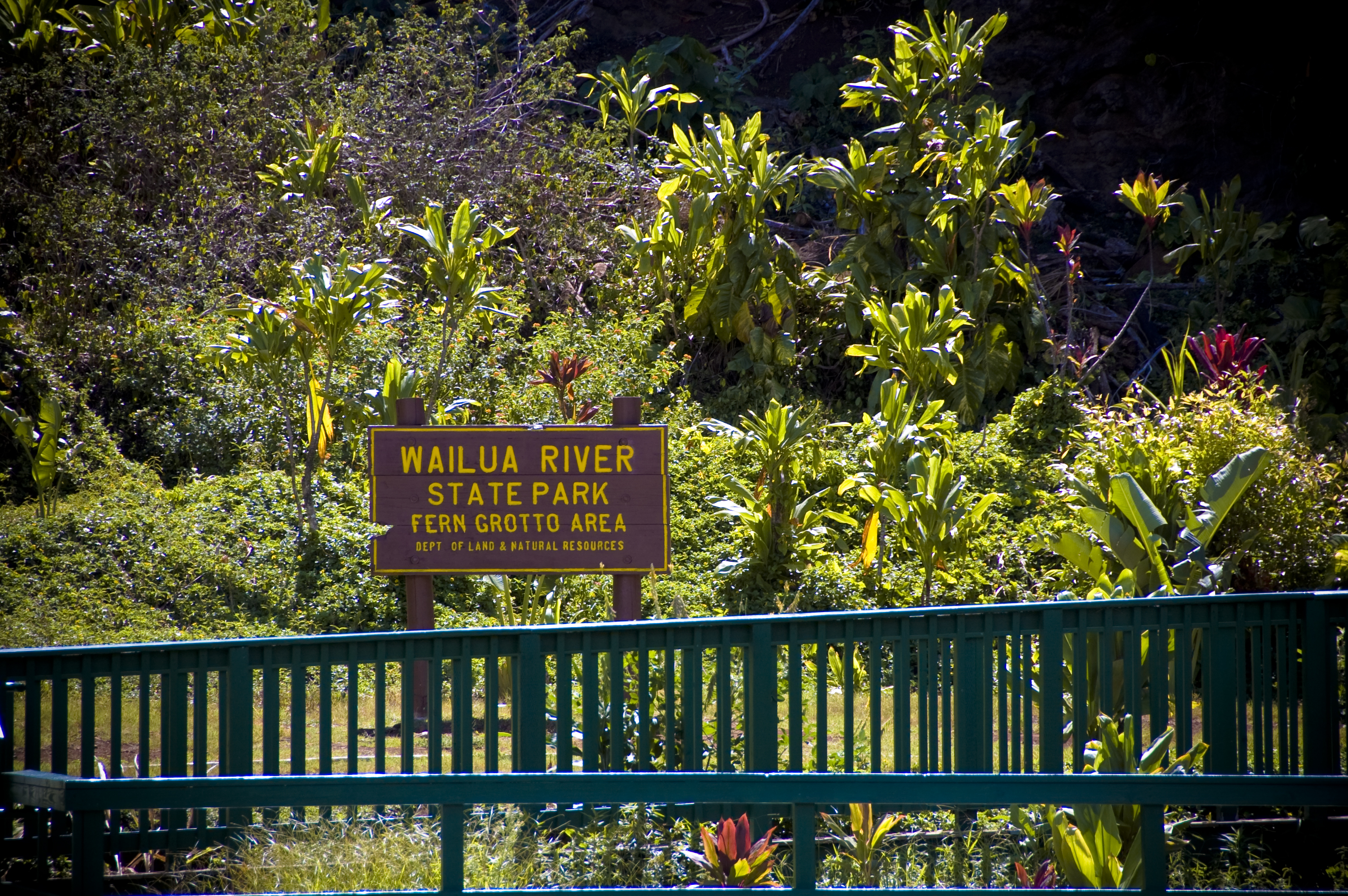
Fern Grotto

Fern Grotto is a fern covered, lava rock grotto located on the south fork of the Wailua River, which is on the eastern side of Kauai in the Hawaiian archipelago. Several boat companies give river tours which lead to the grotto. This attraction is known primarily as the most romantic spot on the island of Kauai, and the area can be rented for weddings.

== History ==
Wailua river flows past the Wailua Complex of Heiau which was a gathering place for the island's chiefs. Pu'uhonua or places of refuge, are located near by as well, along with stones marking the births of new chiefs.

The ferns that the grotto is known for began growing during the plantation era. A basin for storm runoff was built right above the grotto, and water that leaked through encouraged the growth of maidenhair and Boston sword ferns.

Fern Grotto's decline began when it was hit by Hurricane Iwa in 1982. It was then nearly destroyed Kauai was hit by Hurricane Iniki in 1992. Most of the ferns hanging from the grotto were torn from the rocks and, though much of the plant life has rebounded, the grotto has had a difficult time recovering. In spite of the damage, it remains one of the most popular spots on the island.

On April 24, 2006, the grotto was closed by the Hawaii State Department of Land and Natural Resources for safety reasons. Heavy rains in March, 2006, caused a number of rocks and boulders to fall from the ceiling of the grotto onto the viewing area below. It was re-opened in 2007 following reinforcement of the rock walls and installation of ramps to access to the grotto. Prior to the 2006 flooding, visitors were allowed to enter the grotto, but today the grotto may only be viewed from the designated observation deck.

== Access ==
Access to the Grotto is by boat on the Wailua River as part of the Wailua River State Park. Tour boats ply the waters of the park and the Grotto has long been a popular stop on the tour.

Previously, weddings were performed within the grotto, but now they take place on the observation deck facing the grotto.
