= Wailua, Kauaʻi County, Hawaii =

Wailua, Kauai County, Hawaii
- Census-designated place
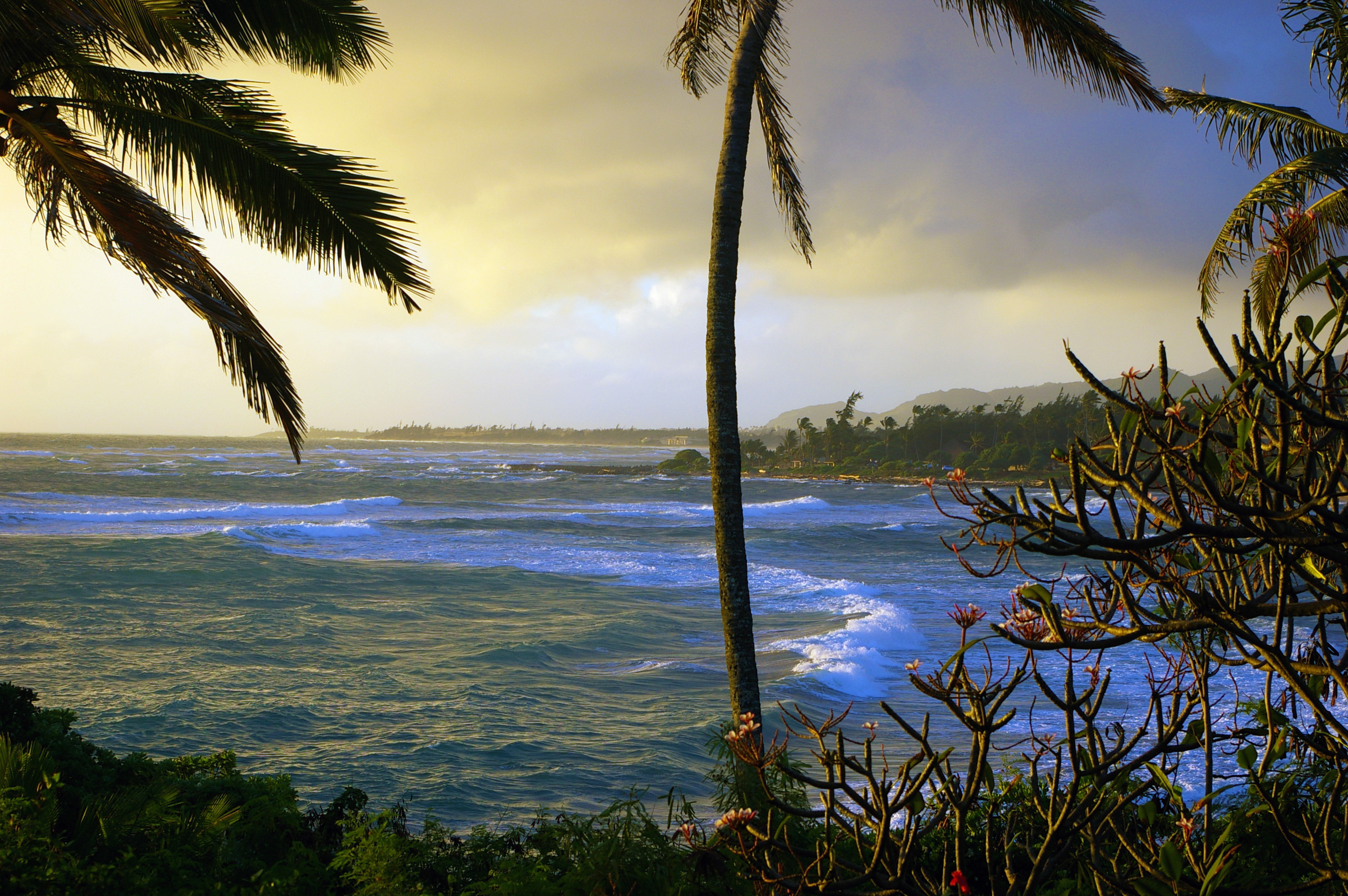
- Kauai coast as seen from Wailua

- Location in Kauaʻi County and the state of Hawaii
- Coordinates: 22°3′31″N 159°20′30″W
- Country: United States
- State: Hawaii
- County: Kauaʻi

Area
  - Total: 1.84 sq mi (4.77 km^{2})
  - Land: 1.54 sq mi (3.98 km^{2})
  - Water: 0.31 sq mi (0.80 km^{2})
- Elevation: 20 ft (6 m)

Population (2020)
  - Total: 2,359
  - Density: 1,536.2/sq mi (593.14/km^{2})
- Time zone: UTC-10 (Hawaii-Aleutian)
- Area code: 808
- FIPS code: 15-77000
- GNIS feature ID: 0364739

Wailua (literally, "two waters" in Hawaiian) is a census-designated place (CDP) in Kauaʻi County, Hawaiʻi, United States. The population was 2,359 at the 2020 census, up from 2,083 at the 2000 census.

== Geography ==
Wailua is located at 22°3′31″N 159°20′30″W (22.058631, -159.341761), on the east side of the island of Kauaʻi. It is bordered to the north by Kapaa, to the west by the Wailua Homesteads CDP, to the south by the Wailua River, and to the east by the Pacific Ocean.

Nounou Mountain, also known as the "Sleeping Giant", is about 1,200 feet (370 m) tall and divides coastal Wailua (the Wailua CDP) from inland Wailua (the Wailua Homesteads CDP). Inland Wailua is often referred to as a bedroom community, since it is home to many, but lacks any commercial or government facilities. Coastal Wailua is a significant commercial center, with many hotels and condominiums for visitors. The Wailua River is the only navigable river in the state of Hawaiʻi and is a center of activity for locals (water skiing, kayaking) and visitors (boat tour of Fern Grotto).

According to the United States Census Bureau, the Wailua CDP has an area of 1.8 square miles (4.6 km^{2}), of which 1.5 square miles (3.8 km^{2}) is land and 0.3 square miles (0.8 km^{2}), or 17.27%, is water.

== Demographics ==
Historical population
Census	Pop.	Note	%±
2020	2,359		—
U.S. Decennial Census

As of the census of 2000, there were 2,083 people, 781 households, and 549 families residing in the CDP. The population density was 1,618.6 inhabitants per square mile (624.9/km^{2}). There were 1,211 housing units at an average density of 941.0 per square mile (363.3/km^{2}). The racial makeup of the CDP was 29.7% White, 0.8% African American, 0.5% Native American, 34.8% Asian, 8.5% Pacific Islander, 0.6% from other races, and 25.1% from two or more races. Hispanic or Latino of any race were 7.1% of the population.

There were 781 households, out of which 30.7% had children under the age of 18 living with them, 52.1% were married couples living together, 12.4% had a female householder with no husband present, and 29.7% were non-families. 23.8% of all households were made up of individuals, and 8.1% had someone living alone who was 65 years of age or older. The average household size was 2.67 and the average family size was 3.16.

In the CDP the population was spread out, with 25.4% under the age of 18, 6.2% from 18 to 24, 25.3% from 25 to 44, 25.6% from 45 to 64, and 17.4% who were 65 years of age or older. The median age was 41 years. For every 100 females, there were 102.0 males. For every 100 females age 18 and over, there were 98.2 males.

The median income for a household in the CDP was $45,875, and the median income for a family was $52,083. Males had a median income of $34,615 versus $25,380 for females. The per capita income for the CDP was $20,231. About 8.7% of families and 8.9% of the population were below the poverty line, including 9.5% of those under age 18 and none of those age 65 or over.

== Attractions ==
The Wailua River State Park consists of a river valley that has recreational opportunities, as well as a "King's Highway" of several heiaus, or ancient Hawaiian temples, birthstones, and a place of sanctuary. According to Reader's Digest, the Wailua complex of heiaus is a "treasure of America."
