= Wailuā River =

Wailua River
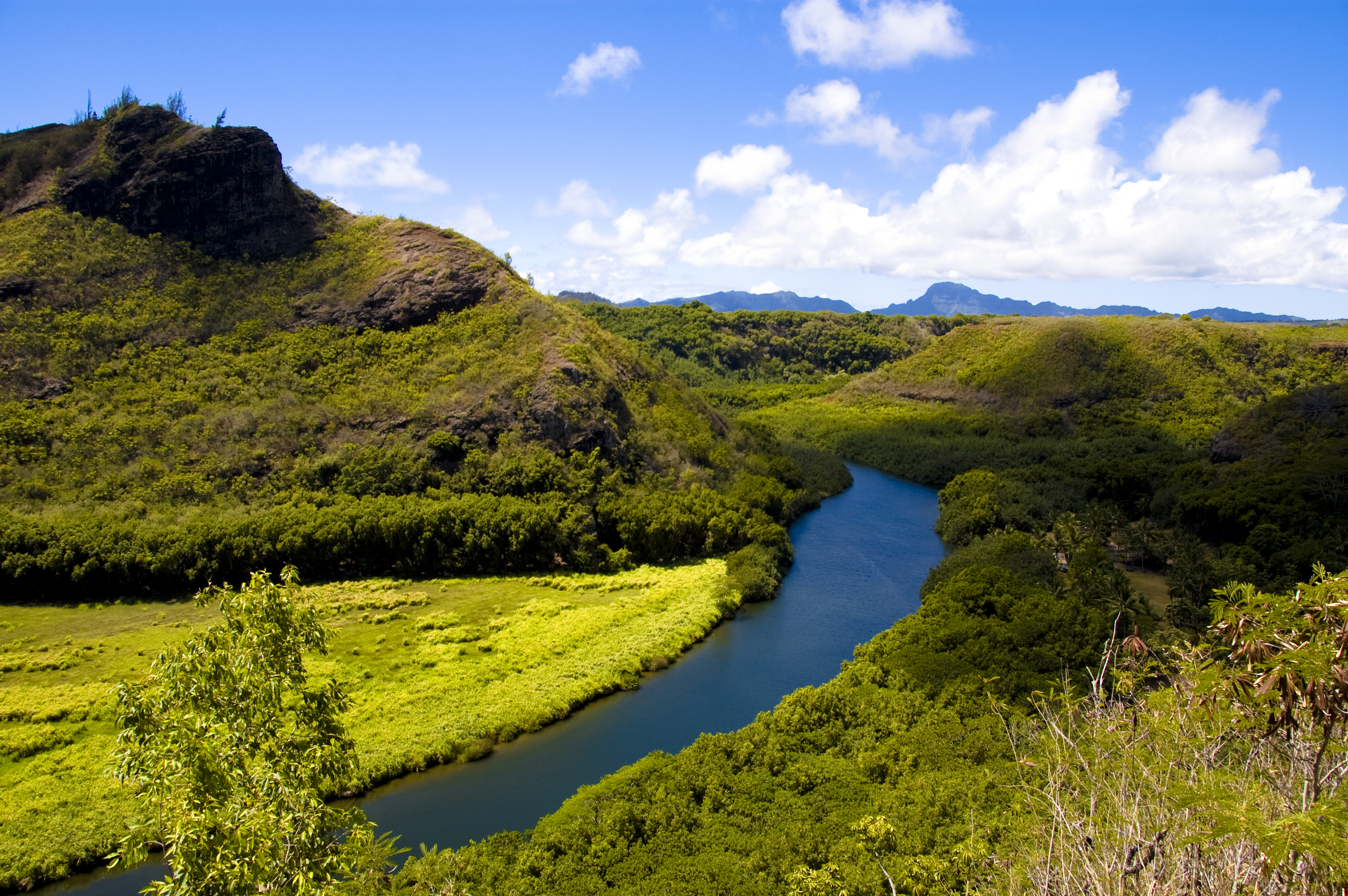
- Wailuā River, Kauaʻi

- Location of mouth

Location
- Country: United States
- State: Hawaii
- Region: Kauai

Physical characteristics
- Source: North Fork
  - location: Mount Waiʻaleʻale
  - coordinates: 22°03′35″N 159°29′33″W
- 2nd source: South Fork
  - location: Hanamaulu
- Source confluence
  - location: west of Wailua, Kauai County, Hawaii
  - coordinates: 22°02′30″N 159°21′38″W
- Mouth: Pacific Ocean
  - location: Wailua, Kauai County, Hawaii
  - coordinates: 22°2′42″N 159°20′11″W
- Length: 23.4 km (14.5 mi)

The Wailuā River is a major river on the island of Kauaʻi in the U.S. state of Hawaii. 23.4 kilometres (14.5 mi) long, it is one of the largest rivers, as well as Kauai's 5th longest river. It is formed by the confluence of its North and South forks just west of Wailua and enters the Pacific Ocean at 22°2′42″N 159°20′11″W. It is the only navigable river (by boats larger than kayaks) in the Hawaiian Islands. It is a center of activity for locals and visitors in the form of boat tours to Fern Grotto, kayaking and water skiing.

The North Fork begins at the Mount Waiʻaleʻale at coordinates 22°3′35″N 159°29′33″W and flows 12.2 miles (19.6 km) east to its junction with the South Fork. The South Fork forms at the junction of several streams southwest of Hanamaulu and flows 8.1 miles (13.0 km) east, over Wailua Falls, to its junction with the North Fork.

Other points of interest along the river system include a bird refuge, Kamokila Hawaiian Village, Secret Falls and a pool which formerly included a rope swing.

== See also ==
- Wailua, Hawaii
- Wailua River State Park
- List of rivers of Hawaii
