= Nishiizu =

Nishiizu 西伊豆町
- Town
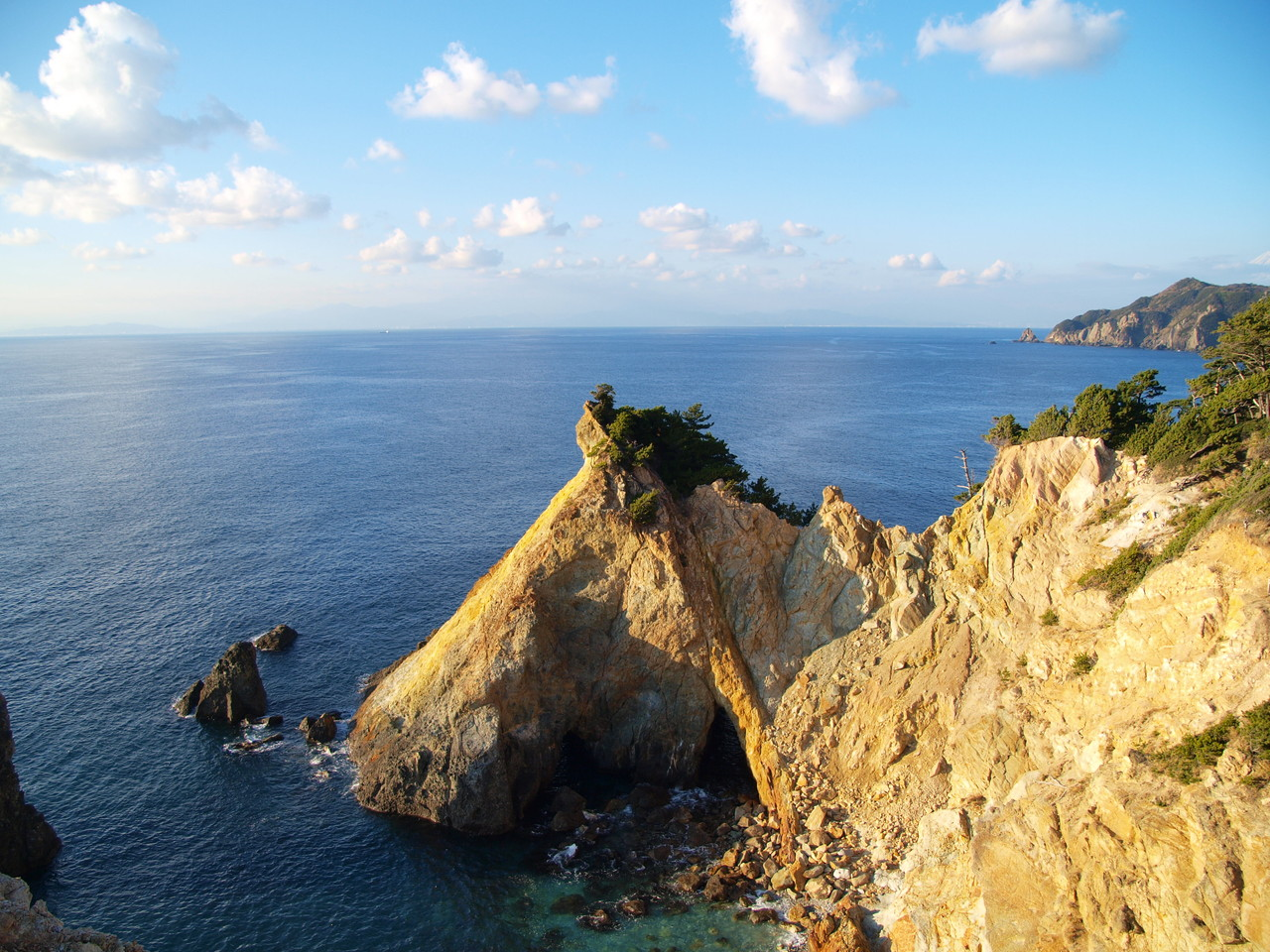
- Koganezaki in Nishiizu Town

- Flag Seal
- Location of Nishiizu in Shizuoka Prefecture

- Location within Japan
- Coordinates: 34°46′N 138°47′E
- Country: Japan
- Region: Chūbu; Tōkai
- Prefecture: Shizuoka
- District: Kamo District

Area
  - Total: 105.52 km^{2} (40.74 sq mi)

Population (August 2019)
  - Total: 7,798
  - Density: 73.90/km^{2} (191.4/sq mi)
- Time zone: UTC+9 (Japan Standard Time)
- Tree: Camellia japonica
- Flower: Farfugium japonicum
- Phone number: 0558-55-0211
- Address: 401-1 Nishina Nishiizu-cho, Kamo-gun, Shizuoka-ken 410-3514
- Website: Official website

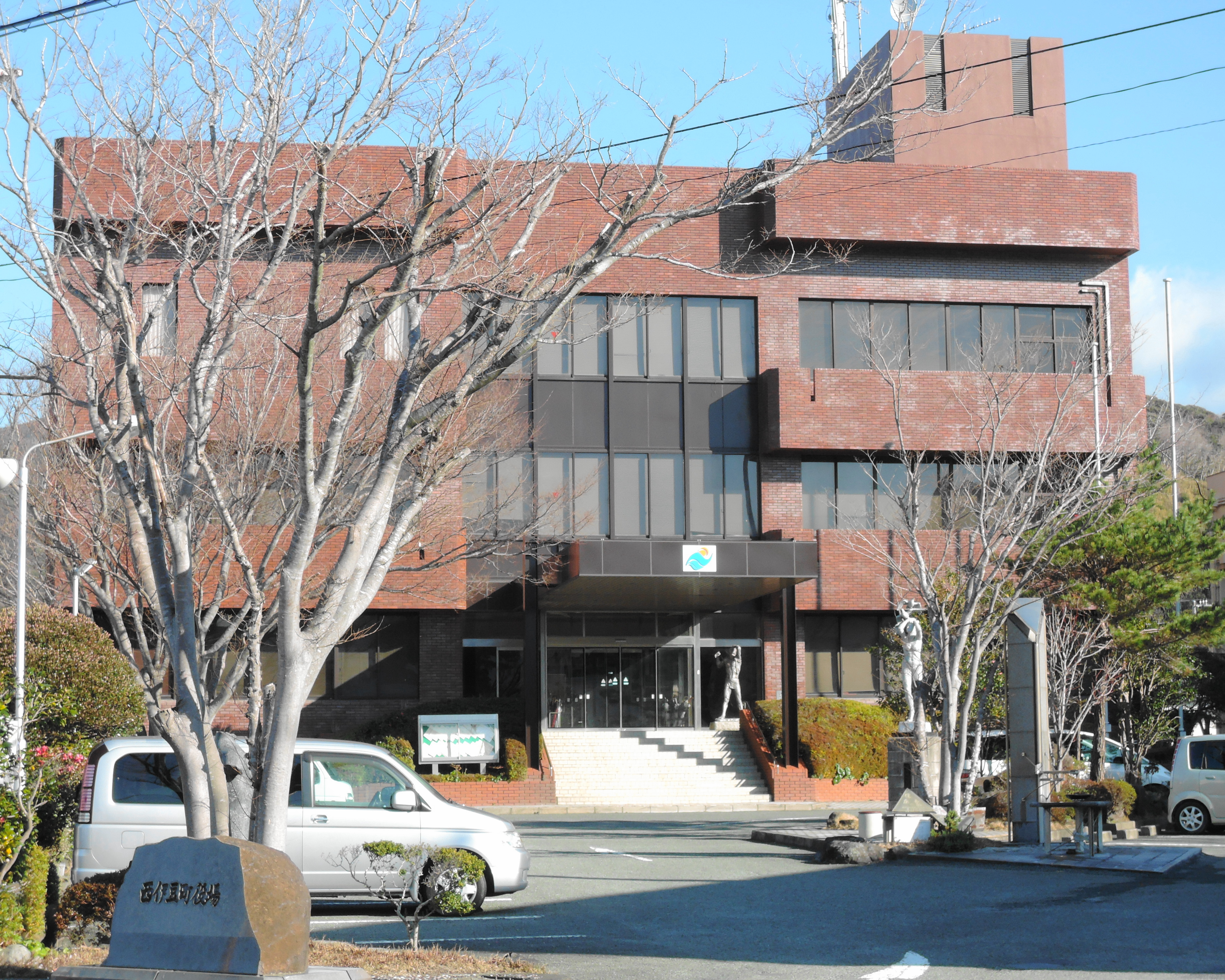
Nishiizu Town Hall

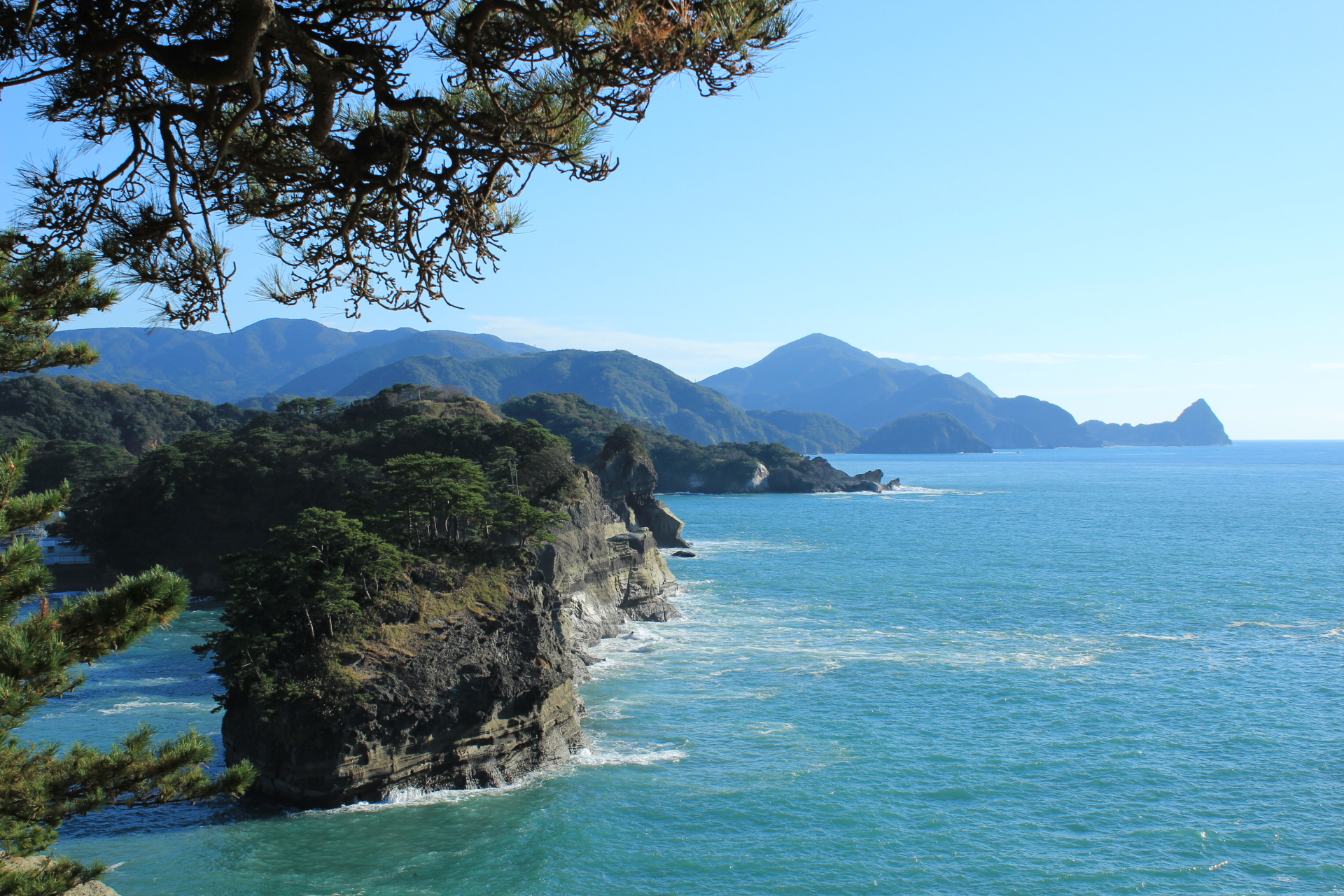
Coastline of Nishiizu

Nishiizu (西伊豆町, Nishiizu-chō) is a town located in Kamo District, Shizuoka Prefecture, Japan. As of 1 August 2019, the town had an estimated population of 7,798 in 3,764 households, and a population density of 74 persons per km^{2}. The total area of the town was 105.52 square kilometres (40.74 sq mi).

== Geography ==
Sandwiched between the Amagi Mountains to the east and Suruga Bay on the Pacific Ocean to the west, Nishiizu has a hill hinterland and a rocky, indented ria coast. The area has numerous hot springs. Warmed by the warm Kuroshio Current, the area enjoys a warm maritime climate with hot, humid summers and mild, cool winters. Parts of the town are within the borders of Fuji-Hakone-Izu National Park.

=== Neighboring municipalities ===
Shizuoka Prefecture

- Izu
- Kawazu
- Matsuzaki

== Demographics ==
Per Japanese census data, the population of Nishiizu has been in decline over the past 60 years.

Historical population
Year	Pop.	±%
1940	15,098	—
1950	18,654	+23.6%
1960	17,152	−8.1%
1970	14,933	−12.9%
1980	14,376	−3.7%
1990	12,696	−11.7%
2000	11,268	−11.2%
2010	9,471	−15.9%

=== Climate ===
The city has a climate characterized by hot and humid summers, and relatively mild winters (Köppen climate classification Cfa). The average annual temperature in Nishiizu is 13.6 °C. The average annual rainfall is 2248 mm with September as the wettest month. The temperatures are highest on average in August, at around 24.0 °C, and lowest in January, at around 3.9 °C.

== History ==
During the Edo period, all of Izu Province was tenryō territory under the direct control of the Tokugawa shogunate, and the area now comprising Nishiizu consisted of seven villages within the ancient Naka District. With the establishment of the modern municipality system of the early Meiji period in 1889, the area was reorganized into three villages (Nishina, Tago, and Ugusu), which became part of the Kamo District in 1896. A fourth village, Arari, was created out of Ugusu the same year.

The town of Nishiizu was founded on March 31, 1956 through the merger of the villages of Tago and Nishina and in September of the same year, the villages of Ugusu and Arari were rejoined to form Kamo. Kamo was merged into Nishiizu on April 1, 2005.

== Economy ==
The economy of Nishiizu is dominated by tourism centered on hot spring resorts, and by commercial fishing.

Dogashima (堂ヶ島, Dōgashima) is a scenic coastal area and tourism destination in Nishiizu. It is also known as "Izu's Matsushima" due to the beauty of its scenery which features pumice cliffs, volcanic rock formations, sea caves, and uninhabited islands. Points of interest include Tensodo Cave and the tombolo connecting Dogashima with the Sanshiro Islands.

== Education ==
Nishiizu has three public elementary schools and one public junior high school operated by the town government. The town does not have a high school.

== Transportation ==
=== Railway ===
Nishiizu does not have any passenger railway service.

=== Highway ===
- National Route 136
