= Hideaway Beach =

Beach in Hawaii, United States

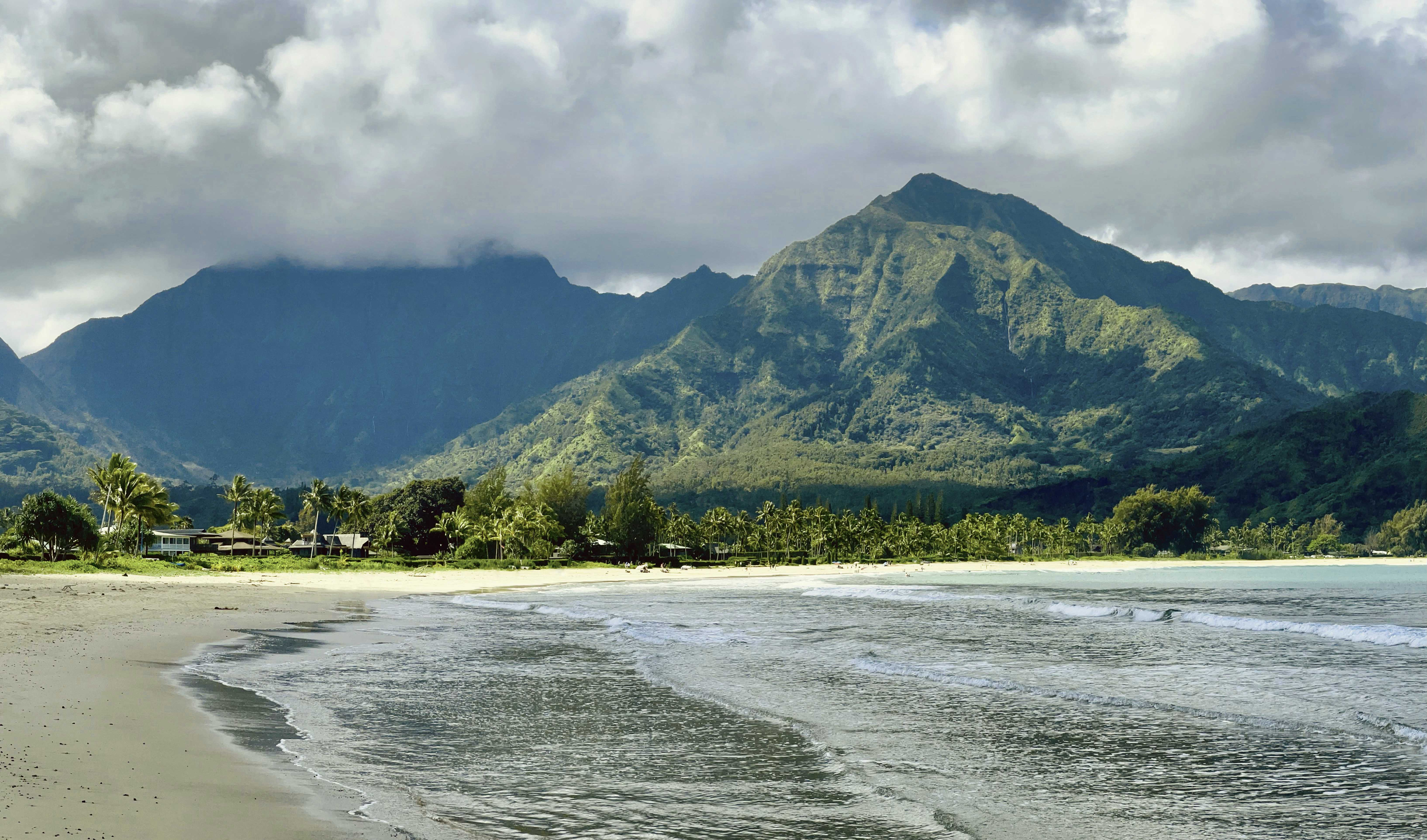
Hideaway Beach, Princeville, North Shore, Kauaʻi

Hideaway Beach, also known as Pali Ke Kua Beach, is a small, secluded beach located on the north shore of Kauaʻi. It sits under the cliffs of Princeville. The beach is small and secluded, with white sand and clear waters. The water is typically calm and protected from the wind, making it a great place for swimming and snorkeling.

== Overview ==
The coral reefs offshore are home to a variety of colorful fish and sea creatures. The beach itself is stunning, offering clean white sand, breezy shade from the trees, and excellent swimming and snorkeling when the surf is low. The underwater world here is teeming with marine life, including colorful tropical fish, sea turtles, and various coral species. Snorkelers and divers can explore the vibrant reef systems just offshore, making it a popular spot for underwater enthusiasts.

== Geography ==
The coordinates of the beach in degrees-minutes-seconds format are 22°13′24″N 159°29′44″W.

Address: Hideaway Beach, Princeville, HI 96722, United States
