= Tensodo Cave =

Sea cave in Japan

Coordinates: 34°46′57.7″N 138°45′58.2″E

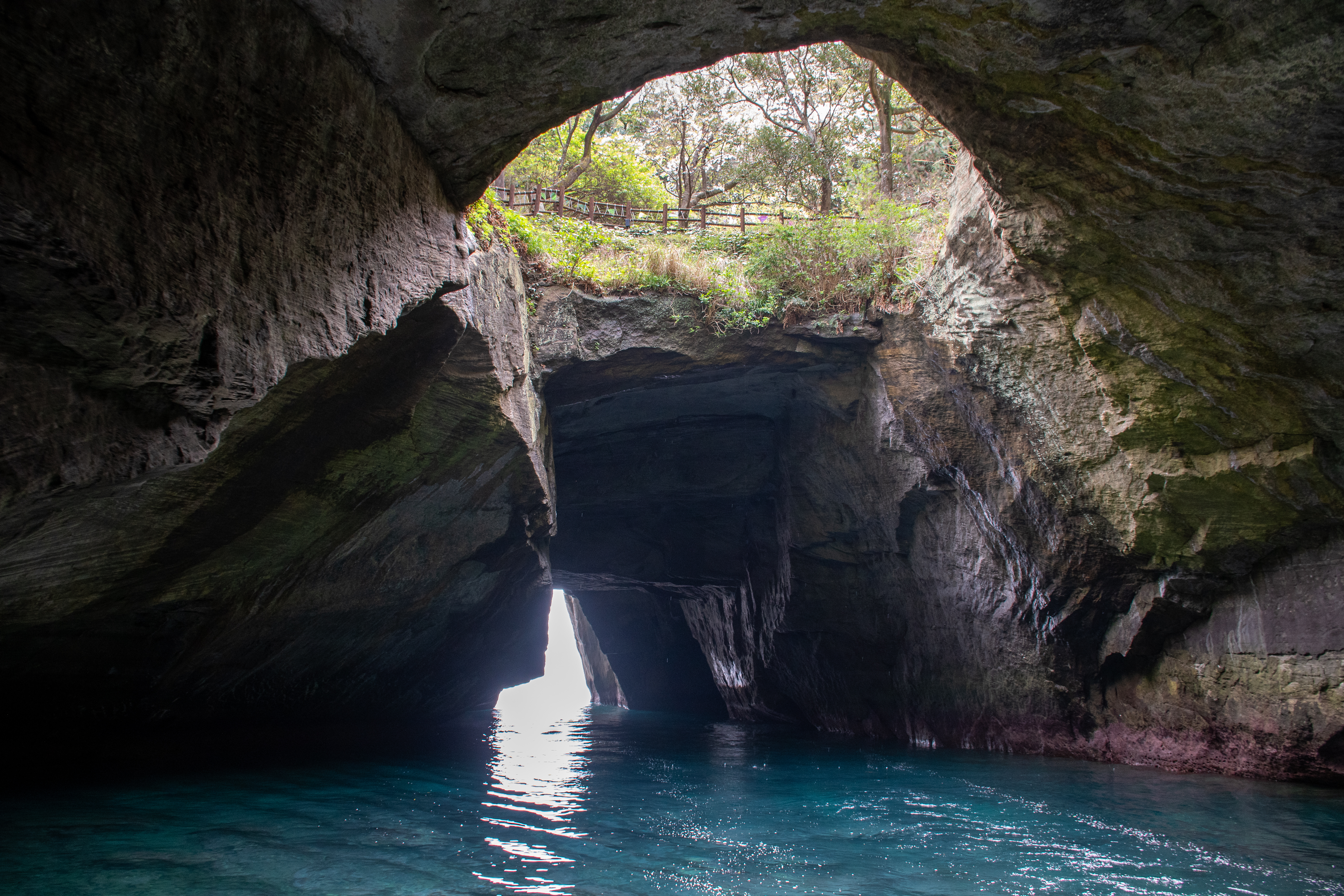
View of natural skylight from inside Tensodo Cave.

Tensodo Cave (天窓洞, tensōdō) is a sea cave in Dogashima named after the skylight (tensō) that was created when a portion of the ceiling collapsed from erosion.

Under the name "Dogashima Tensodo," it was designated as a Natural Monument (天然記念物, tennen kinenbutsu) on August 27, 1935. Additionally, it was registered as one of the sites on the Izu Peninsula Geopark list, established in 2011. Dogashima is situated roughly in the center of the western coast of the Izu Peninsula, facing Suruga Bay, and the coastal area (including Tensodo Cave) has also been designated as a Place of Scenic Beauty (名勝, meishō) under the name "Izu Southwestern Coast."
