= Tombolo (Dogashima) =

Coastal landform in Nishiizu, Japan

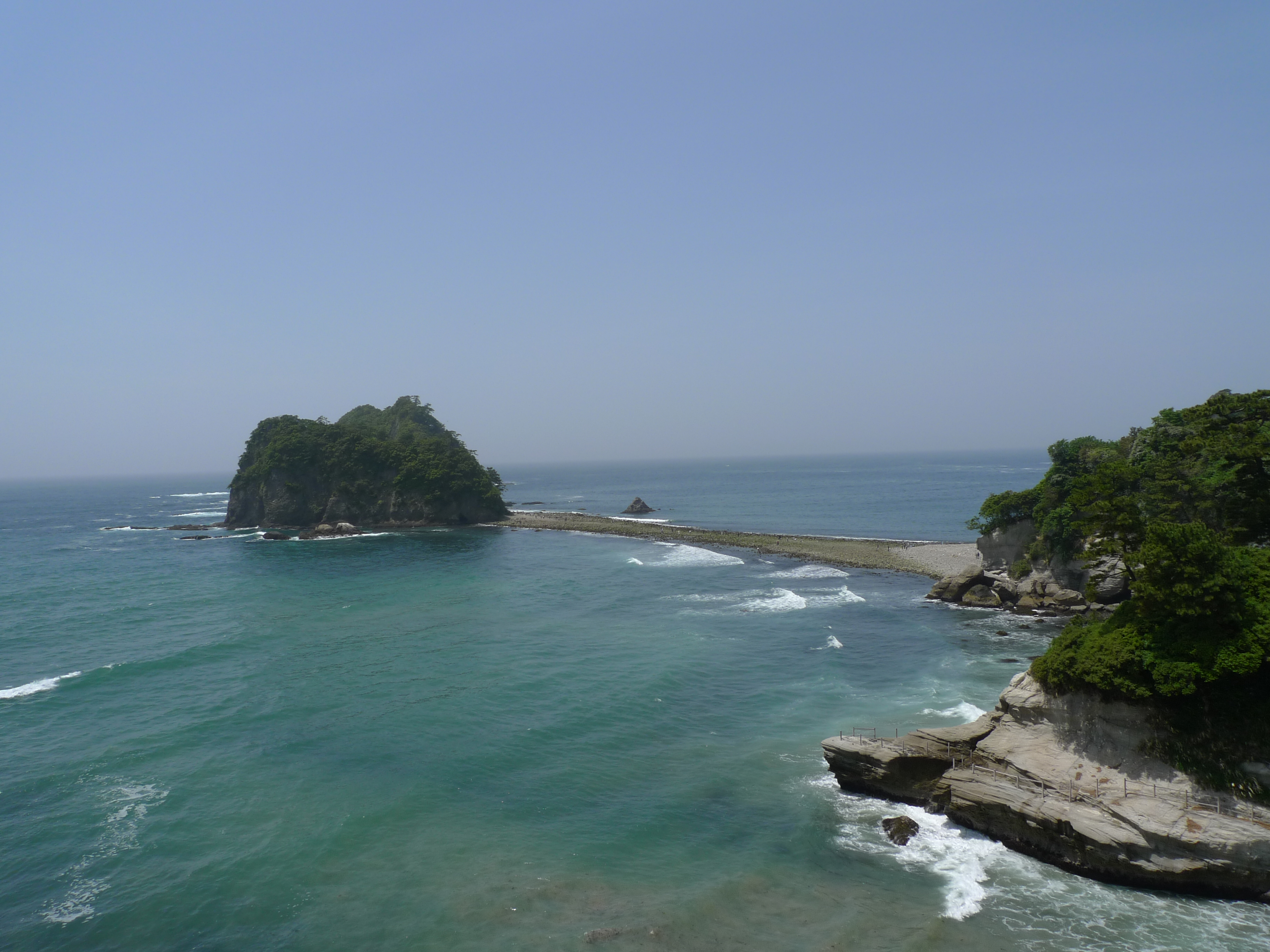
Tombolo seen from Dogashima Park

Tombolo is a shingle isthmus that connects Dogashima with the Sanshiro Islands at low tide. Tombolo is named after the Italian word tombolo, meaning 'pillow' or 'cushion', which refers to a deposition landform by which an island becomes attached to the mainland by a narrow piece of land such as a spit or bar.

Tombolo begins at Hamase Beach on Dogashima and extends to Elephant Island and Nakano Island of the Sanshiro Islands. A small canal cuts off Tombolo between Elephant and Nakano Island. The tombolo is 250 meters long and 30 meters across at low tide between March and September. Rather than being sandy, the tombolo is stoney, with the rocks often covered by seaweed and slippery to walk on.

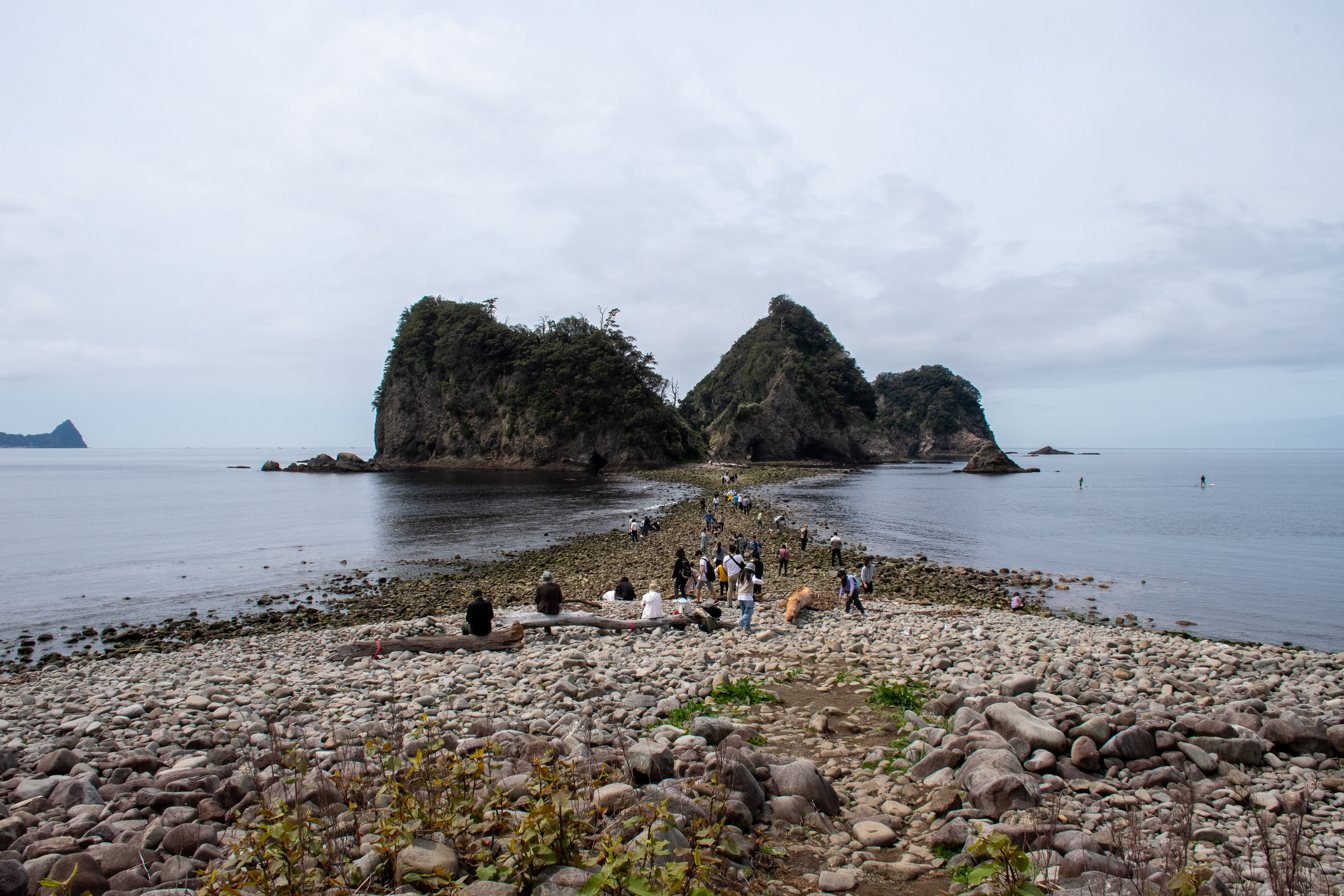
Tombolo seen from Hamase Beach

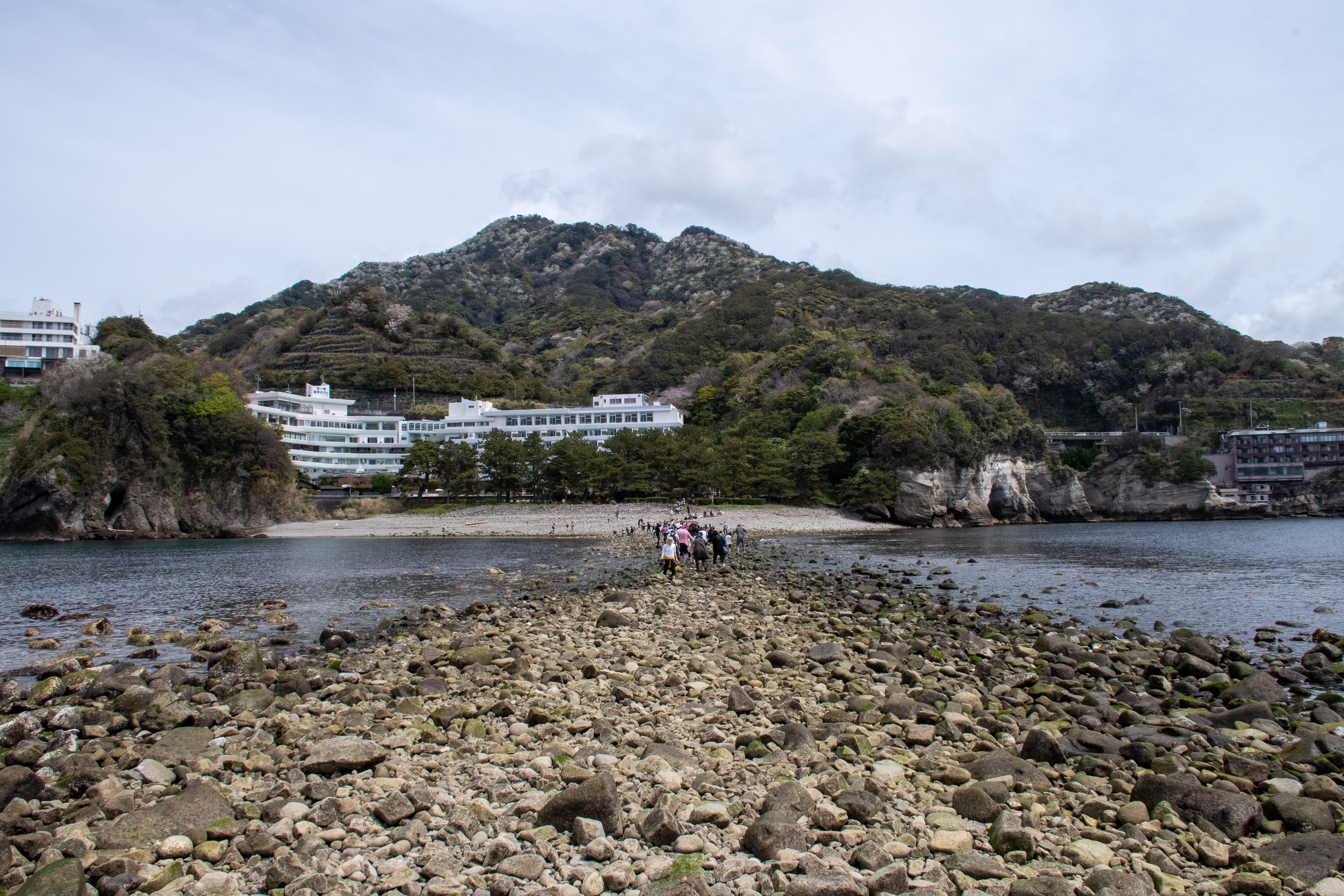
Tombolo seen from Elephant Island near end of low tide
