= Tombolo =

Deposition landform in which an island is connected to the mainland by a sandy isthmus

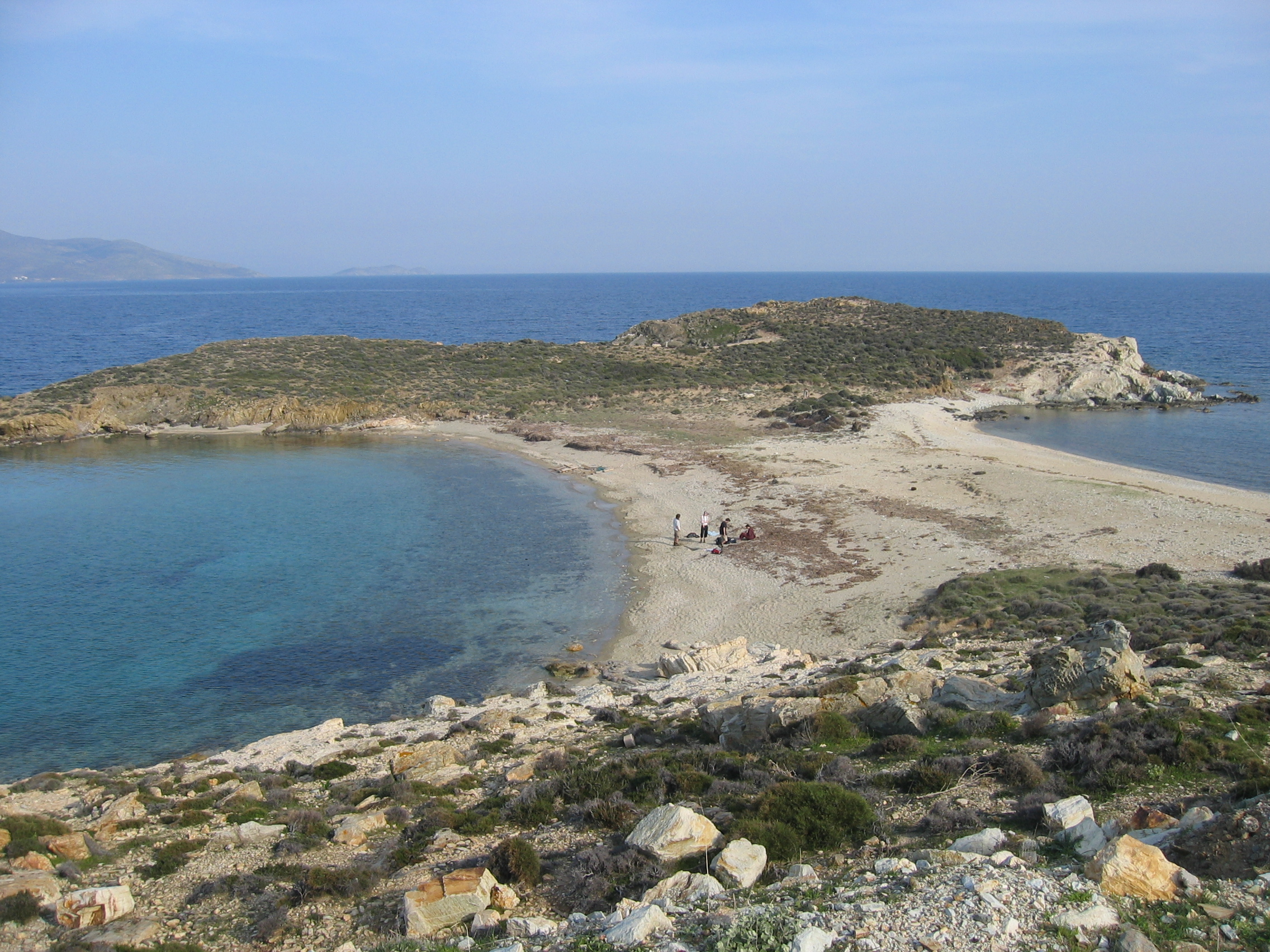
Tombolo near Karystos, Euboea, Greece

Tombolo contrasted with other coastal landforms

A tombolo is a sandy or shingle isthmus. It is a deposition landform by which an island becomes attached to the mainland by a narrow piece of land such as a spit or bar. Once attached, the island is then known as a tied island. The word tombolo is from the Italian tombolo, meaning 'pillow' or 'cushion', and sometimes translated incorrectly as ayre (an ayre is a shingle beach of any kind).

Several islands tied together by bars which rise above the water level are called a tombolo cluster. Two or more tombolos may form an enclosure (called a lagoon) that can eventually fill with sediment.

== Formation ==
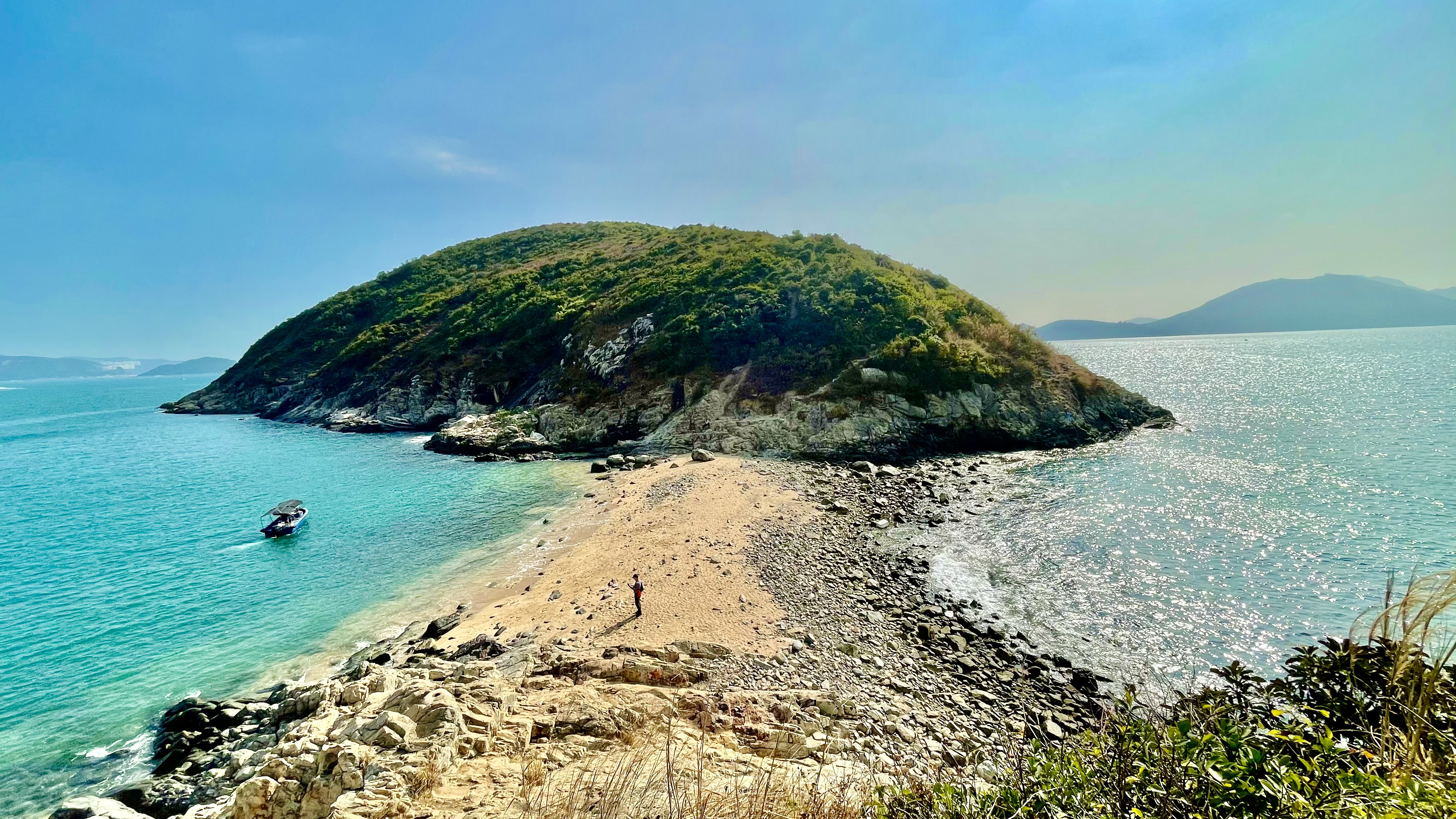
Tombolo connecting Ap Lei Pai to Ap Lei Chau, Hong Kong

The shoreline moves toward the island (or detached breakwater) owing to the accretion of sand in the lee of the island, where wave energy and longshore drift are reduced and therefore deposition of sand occurs.

=== Wave diffraction and refraction ===
True tombolos are formed by wave refraction and diffraction. As waves near an island, they are slowed by the shallow water surrounding it. These waves then bend around the island to the opposite side as they approach. The wave pattern created by this water movement causes a convergence of longshore drift on the opposite side of the island. The beach sediments that are moving by lateral transport on the lee side of the island will accumulate there, conforming to the shape of the wave pattern. In other words, the waves sweep sediment together from both sides. Eventually, when enough sediment has built up, the beach shoreline, known as a spit, will connect with an island and form a tombolo.

=== Unidirectional longshore drift ===
In the case of longshore drift due to an oblique wave direction, like at Chesil Beach or Spurn Head, the flow of material is along the coast in a movement which is not determined by wave diffraction around the now tied island, such as the Isle of Portland, which it has reached. In this and similar cases like Cádiz, while the strip of beach material connected to the island may be technically called a tombolo because it links the island to the land, it is better thought of in terms of its formation as a spit, because the sand or shingle ridge is parallel rather than at right angles to the coast.

== Morphology and sediment distribution ==
Tombolos demonstrate the sensitivity of shorelines. A small piece of land, such as an island, or a beached shipwreck can change the way that waves move, leading to different deposition of sediments. Sea level rise may also contribute to accretion, as material is pushed up with rising sea levels. Tombolos are more prone to natural fluctuations of profile and area as a result of tidal and weather events than a normal beach is.

Because of this susceptibility to weathering, tombolos are sometimes made more sturdy through the construction of roads or parking lots. The sediments that make up a tombolo are coarser towards the bottom and finer towards the surface. It is easy to see this pattern when the waves are destructive and wash away finer grained material at the top, revealing coarser sands and cobbles as the base.

== Examples ==
- Aoshima, Miyazaki, Japan
- Aupōuri Peninsula, New Zealand
- Barrenjoey Headland, Pittwater, New South Wales, Australia
- Beavertail Point, Conanicut Island, Rhode Island, United States
- Biddeford Pool, Maine, United States
- Bijia Mountain, China
- Boquete sandbar (Paniquian Island), Puerto Galera, Philippines
- Broulee Island, New South Wales, Australia
- Bruny Island, Tasmania, Australia
- Burgh Island, Devon, England
- Cabo Rojo, Puerto Rico
- Cádiz, Andalucía, Spain
- Cana Island, Wisconsin, United States
- Chappaquiddick Island, Martha's Vineyard, Massachusetts, United States
- Charles Island, Connecticut, United States
- Chausey, Manche département, France (two features connecting the main island and two smaller outcrops)
- Chesil Beach, Portland, Dorset, England
- Cheung Chau, Hong Kong
- Crimea, Ukraine
- Depeldet, El Nido, Philippines
- Enoshima, Fujisawa, Japan
- Eaglehawk Neck, Tasmania, Australia
- S'Espalmador, Formentera, Spain
- Fingal Bay, New South Wales, Australia
- The Rock of Gibraltar
- Grand Island National Recreation Area, Michigan, United States
- Grótta, Seltjarnarnes, Iceland
- Guanarteme, Las Palmas de Gran Canaria, Canary Islands, Spain
- Gugh, St Agnes, Isles of Scilly, England
- Gwadar, Pakistan
- Hakodate, Hokkaido, Japan
- Howth Head, Dublin, Republic of Ireland
- Inishkeel Island, Narin, Republic of Ireland
- Isola Bella (Sicily), Italy
- Kapıdağ Peninsula, Balıkesir, Turkey
- Sinop Peninsula, Sinop, Turkey
- Konet Island, Kuala Sungai Baru, Malacca, Malaysia
- Kurnell, Sydney, New South Wales, Australia
- Lake Pomorie, Bulgaria
- Langness, Derbyhaven, Isle of Man
- Little Heart's Ease, Newfoundland and Labrador beach, Newfoundland, Canada
- Llandudno, North Wales
- Louds Island at Muscongus Bay, Maine, United States
- Maharees, Dingle Peninsula, Republic of Ireland
- Mare Island, Vallejo, California, United States
- Maria Island, Tasmania, Australia
- Maury Island, Washington, United States
- McMicken Island State Park, Washington, United States
- Miquelon, Saint-Pierre and Miquelon, France
- Monemvasia, Laconia, Peloponnese, Greece
- Monte Argentario, Tuscany, Italy
- Mont-Saint-Michel, Normandy, France
- Mount Maunganui, New Zealand
- Mount Taipingot, Rota, Northern Marianas
- Nahant, Massachusetts, United States (a natural tombolo, but connected to the mainland by a causeway)
- Nissi beach, Ayia Napa, Cyprus
- Nusa Dua, Bali, Indonesia
- Ormara, Pakistan
- Palisadoes, Kingston, Jamaica
- Pangandaran, West Java, Indonesia
- Peniche, Portugal
- Peniscola, Castellon, Spain
- Presque Isle, Michigan, United States
- Presqu'ile de Giens, Hyères, France
- Presqu'ile Provincial Park, Ontario, Canada
- Quiberon, France
- Ras Hafun, Somalia
- Sainte-Marie, Martinique, France
- Scotts Head, Dominica
- Seongsan Ilchulbong in Jeju Province, South Korea
- Sharp Island, Sai Kung District, Hong Kong
- Silver Strand (San Diego), Coronado, California, United States
- St Michael's Mount, Cornwall, England
- St Ninian's Isle, Shetland, Scotland
- Sveti Stefan, near Budva, Montenegro
- Tandol tombolo, El Nido, Philippines
- Tombolo at Dogashima in Japan
- Umi no Nakamichi, Fukuoka Prefecture, Japan
- Vatersay, Scotland – the island comprises two sections connected by a broad tombolo
- Zhifu Island, Yantai, China

Some of these may be simple isthmuses, and not have the deposition creation that defines a true tombolo.

=== Image gallery ===
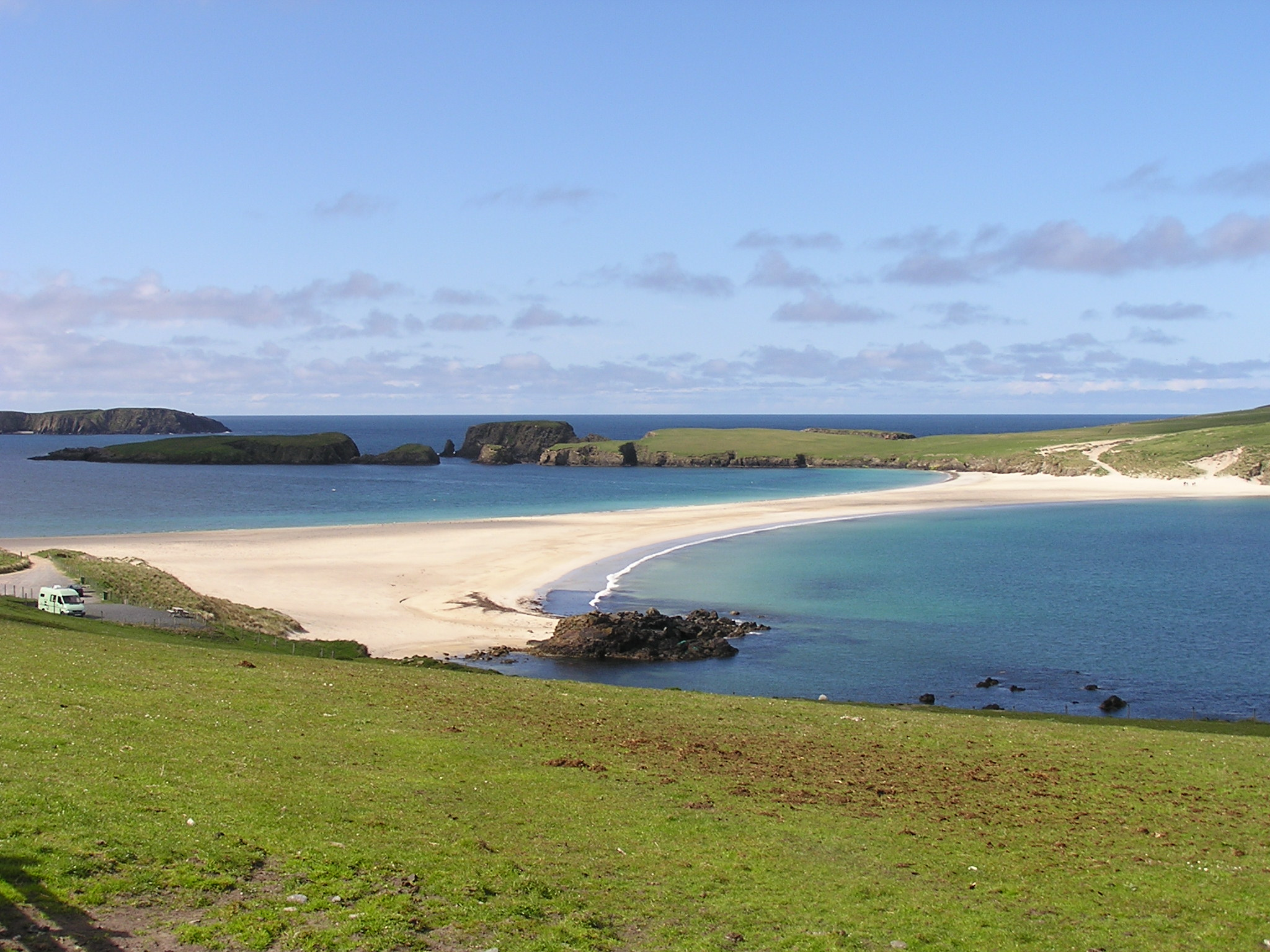
The tombolo connecting St Ninian's Isle with the Shetland Mainland

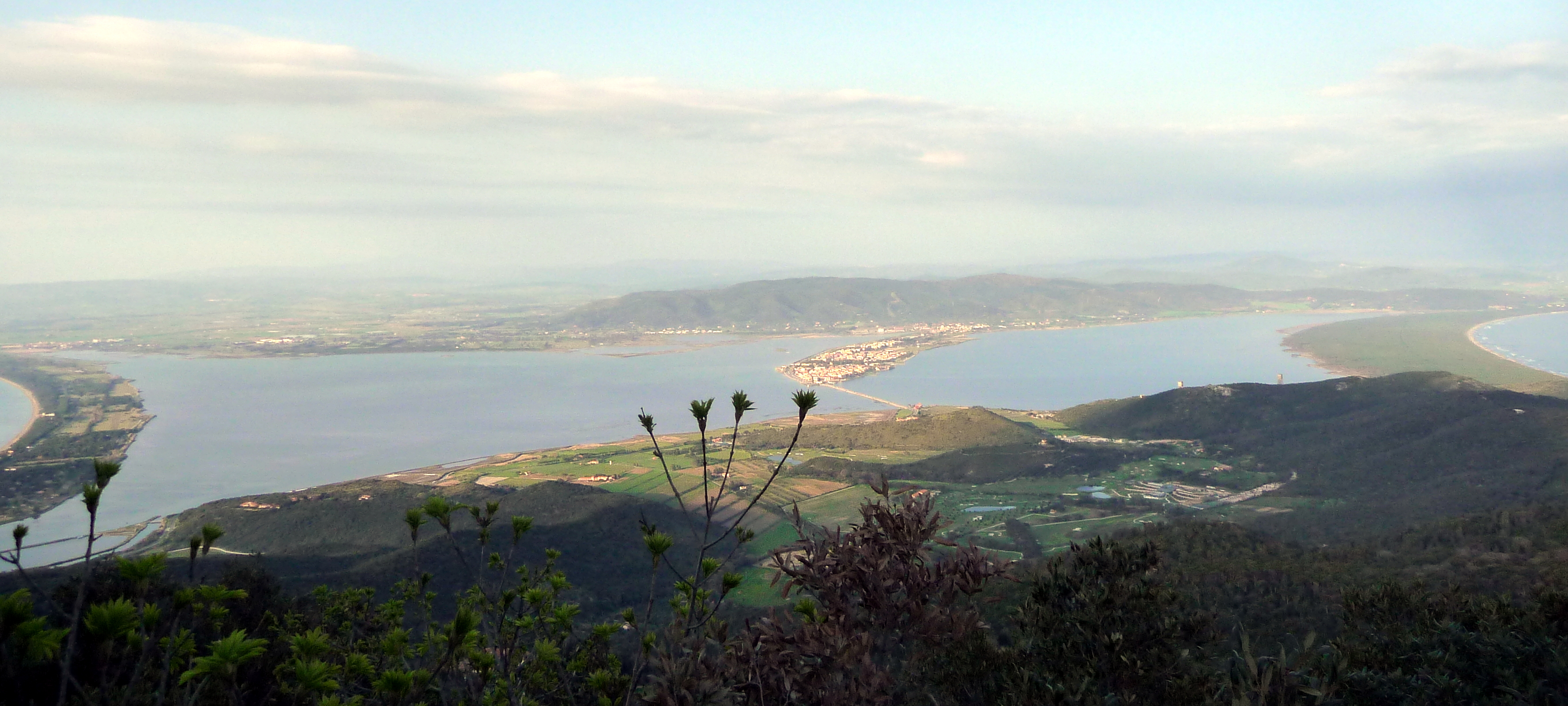
Monte Argentario, Tuscany, Italy

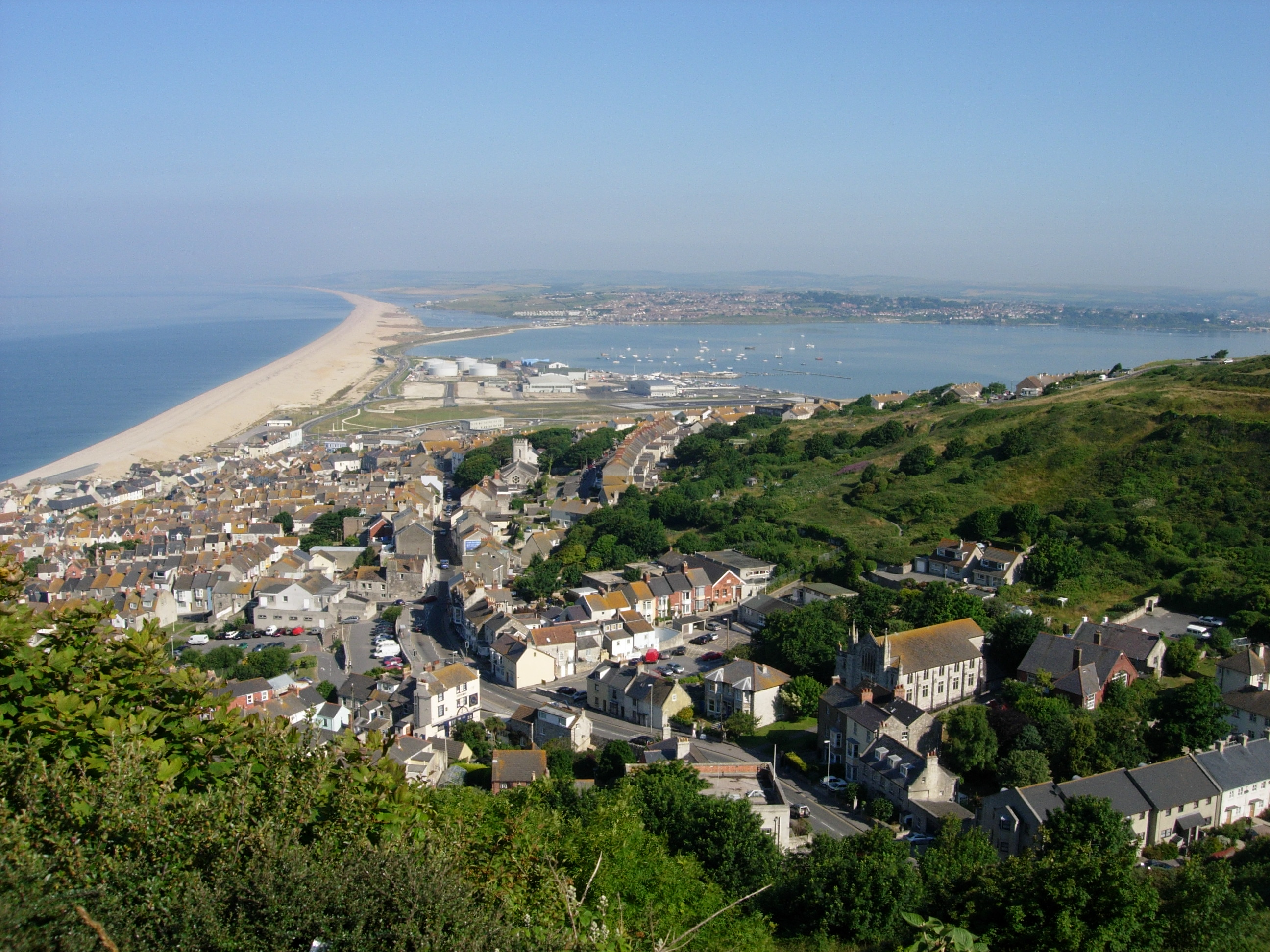
Chesil Beach, seen from the Isle of Portland looking towards mainland Dorset

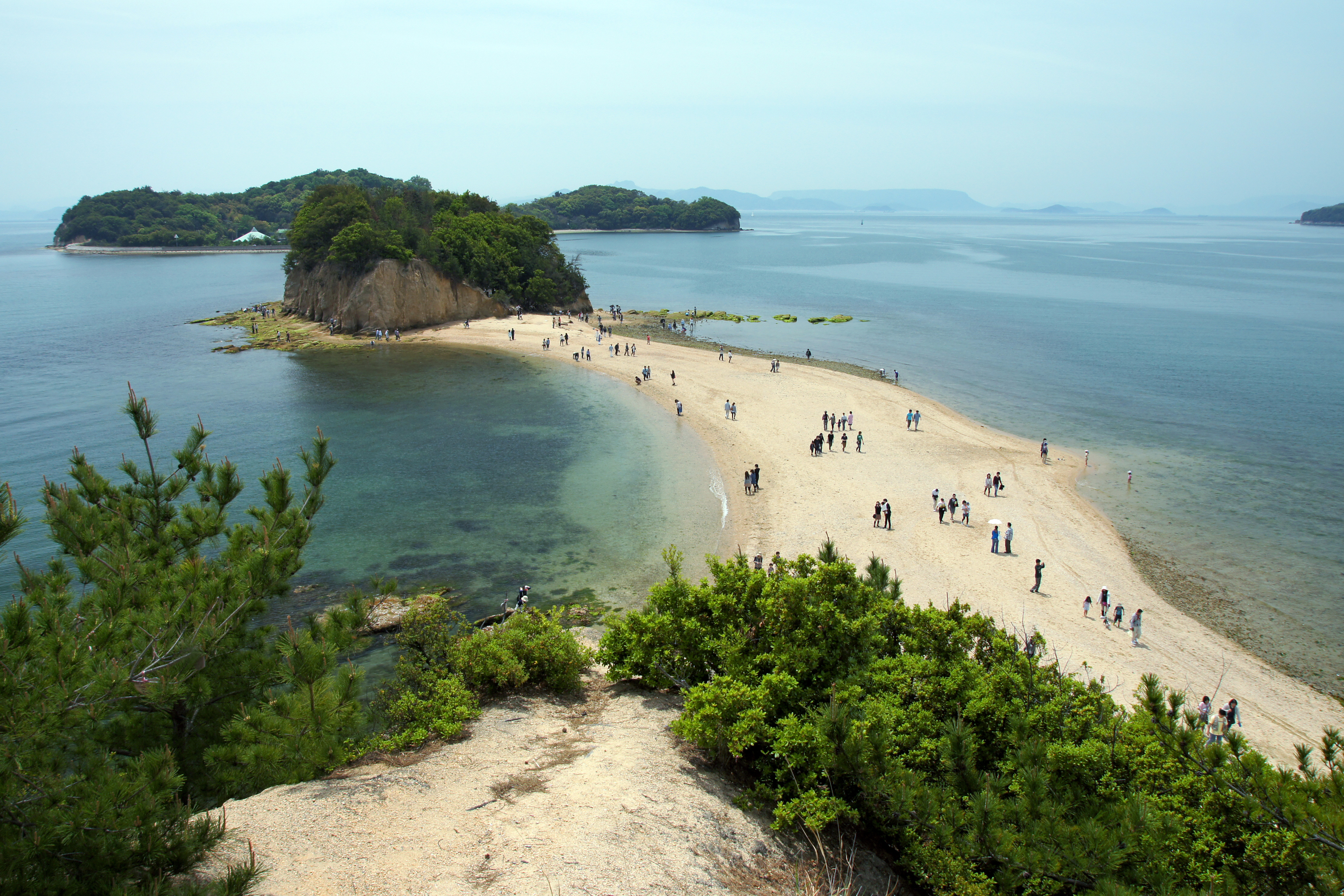
The Angel Road of Shōdoshima, Japan

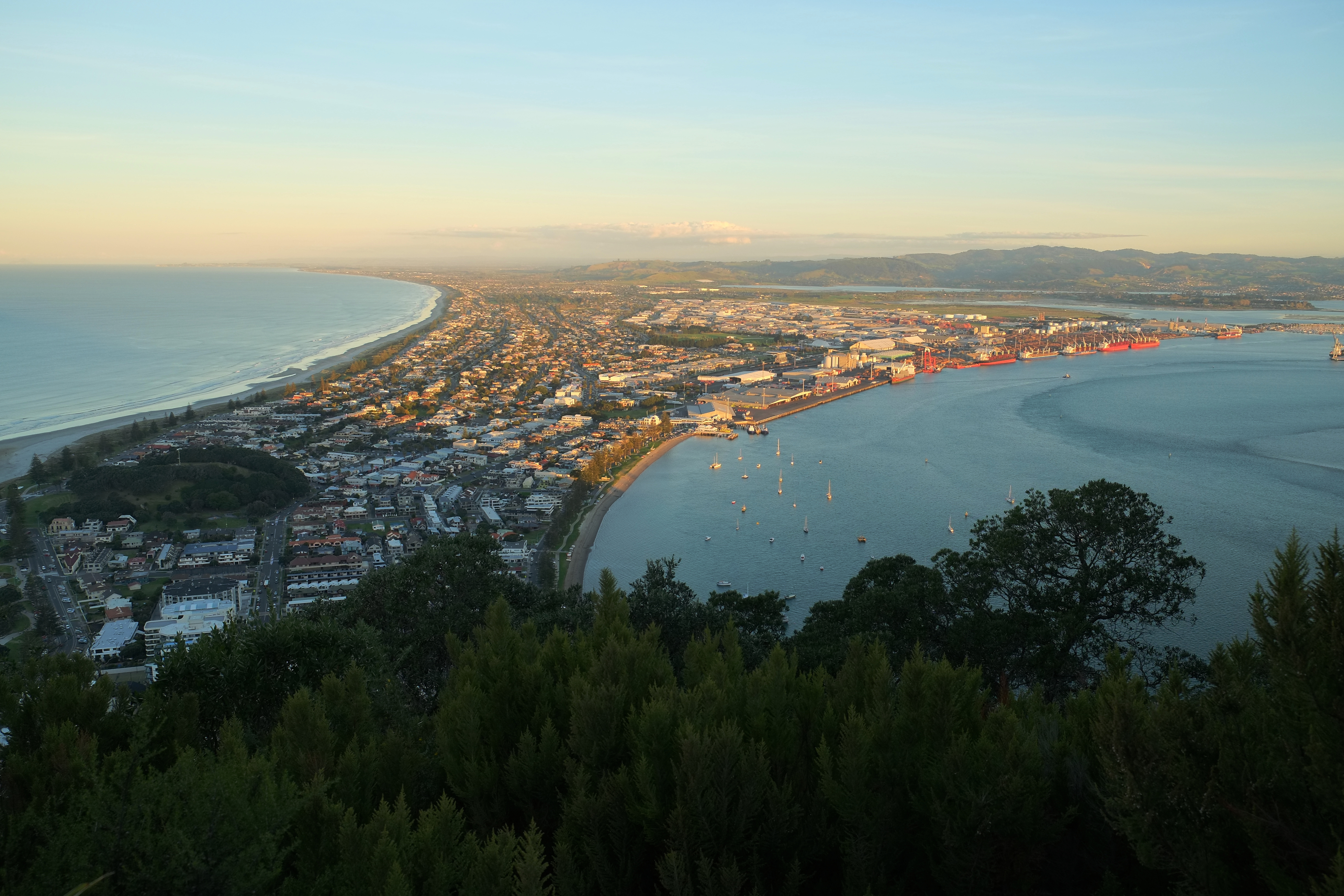
Looking south from the summit of Mount Maunganui, New Zealand, to the city of Tauranga

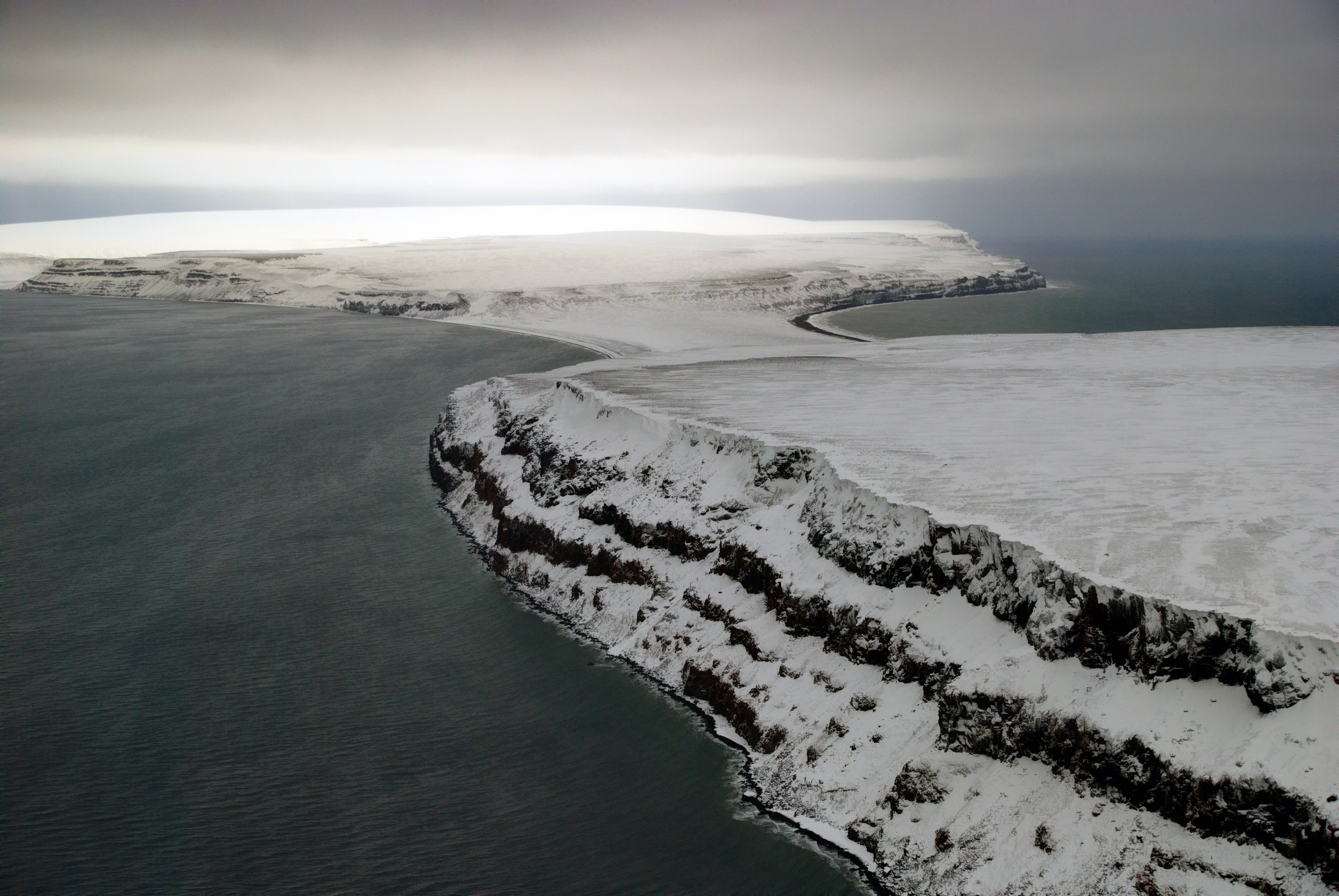
The eastern end of Bennett Island with its glaciated tombolo in the background

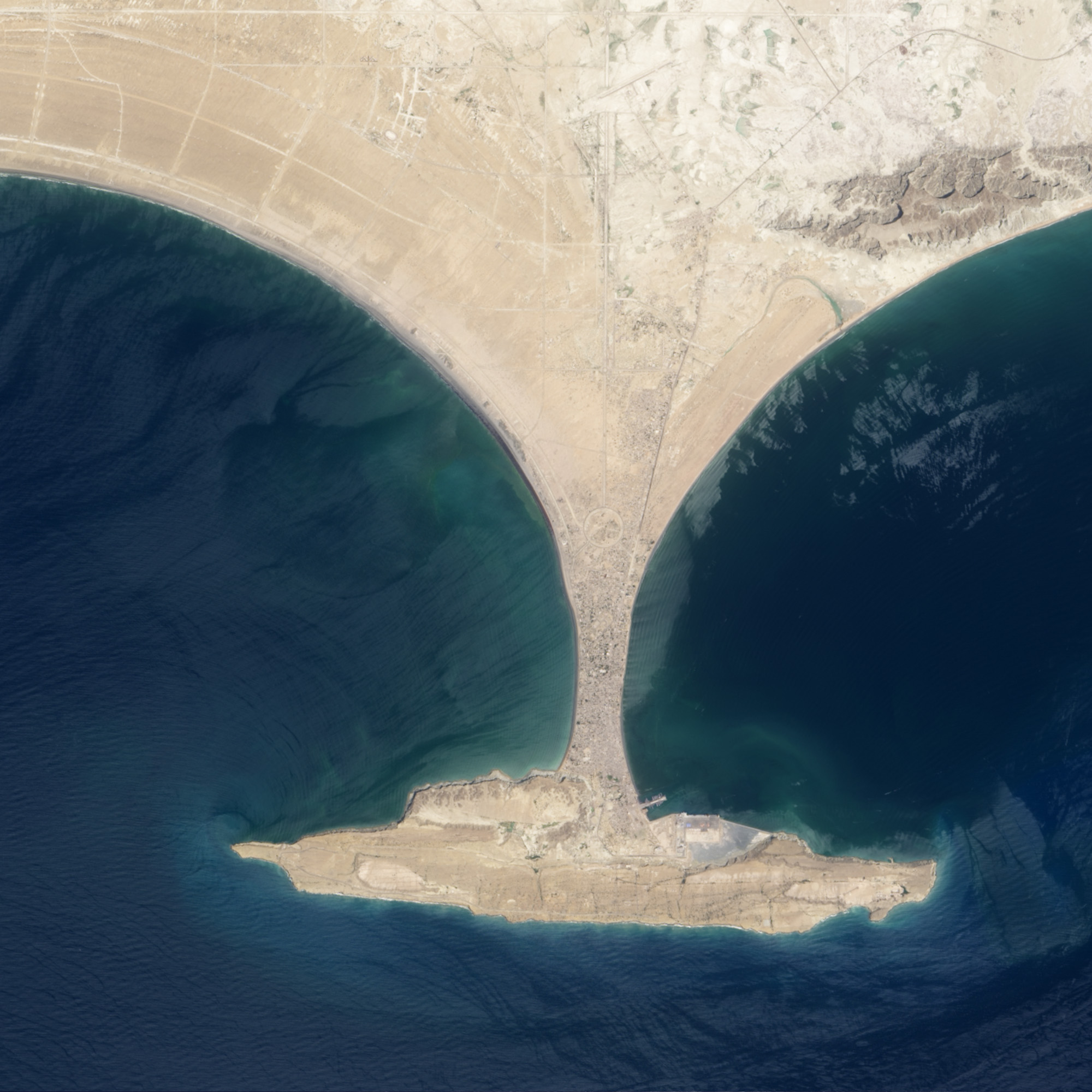
Satellite view of Gwadar, Pakistan

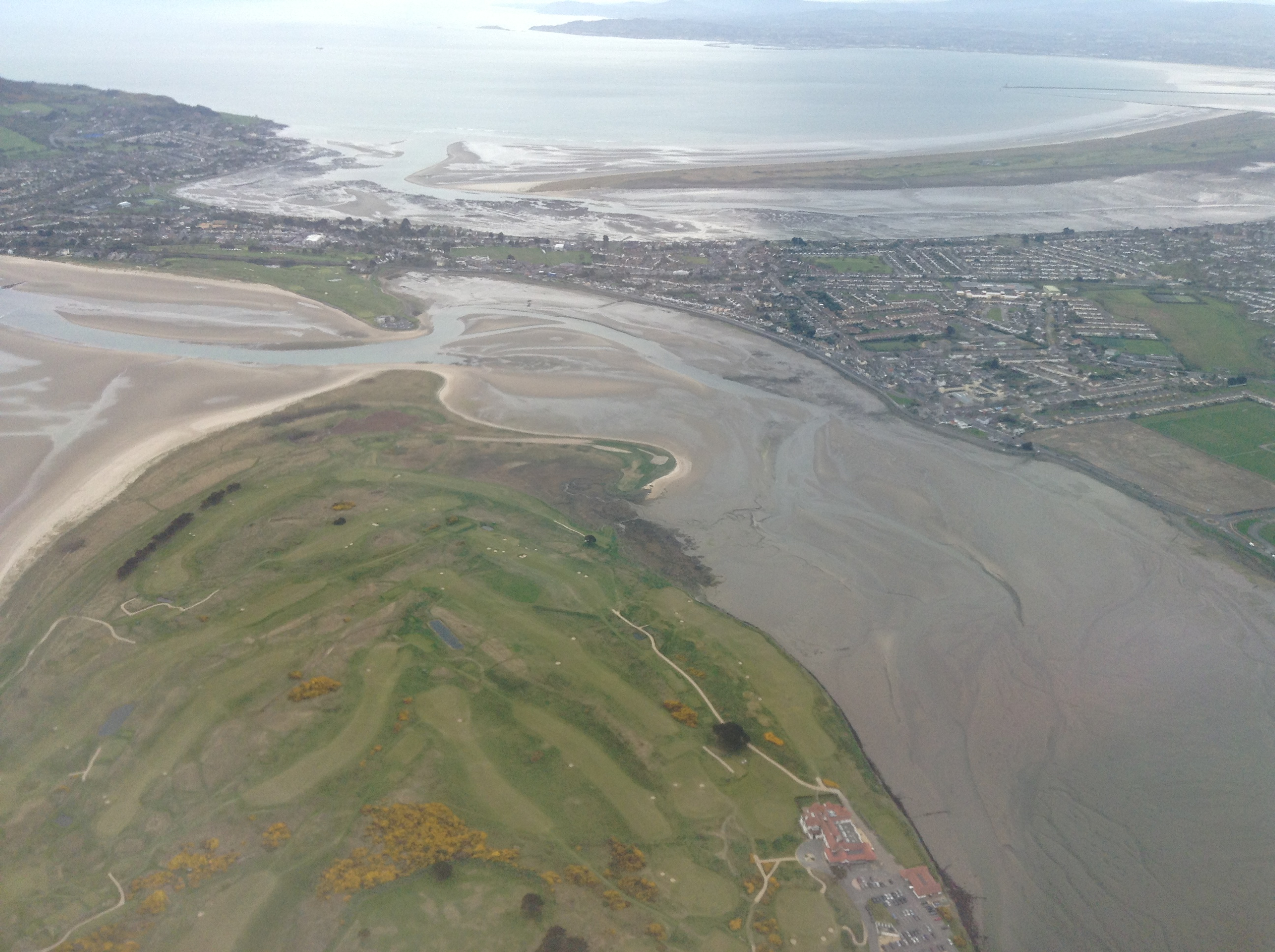
An aerial photo of the isthmus of Sutton which connects Howth Head and County Dublin

== See also ==
- Ayre (landform) – Shingle beaches in Orkney and Shetland
- Bar – Natural submerged sandbank that rises from a body of water to near the surface
- Causeway – Route raised up on an embankment
- Cuspate foreland – Geographical features found on coastlines and lakeshores
- Isthmus – Strip of land connecting two larger areas
- Peninsula – Land feature
- Tied island – Island that is connected to land only by a tombolo
- Shoal – Natural submerged sandbank that rises from a body of water to near the surface
