= Mount Taipingot =

Mountain in Songsong, Rota, Mariana Islands

Coordinates: 14.1256°N 145.1280°E

Mount Taipingot is a mountain that is located at the southern end of the village of Songsong on the Rota in the Mariana Islands. It is connected to the main part of Rota by a tombolo, on which is the southern part of Songsong. It is more commonly known as "Wedding Cake Mountain" because of its resemblance to a layered wedding cake. The areas in and around the mountain are conservation areas established to protect the native flora and fauna that thrive there.
