= Princeville, Hawaii =

- Unincorporated community Census-designated place
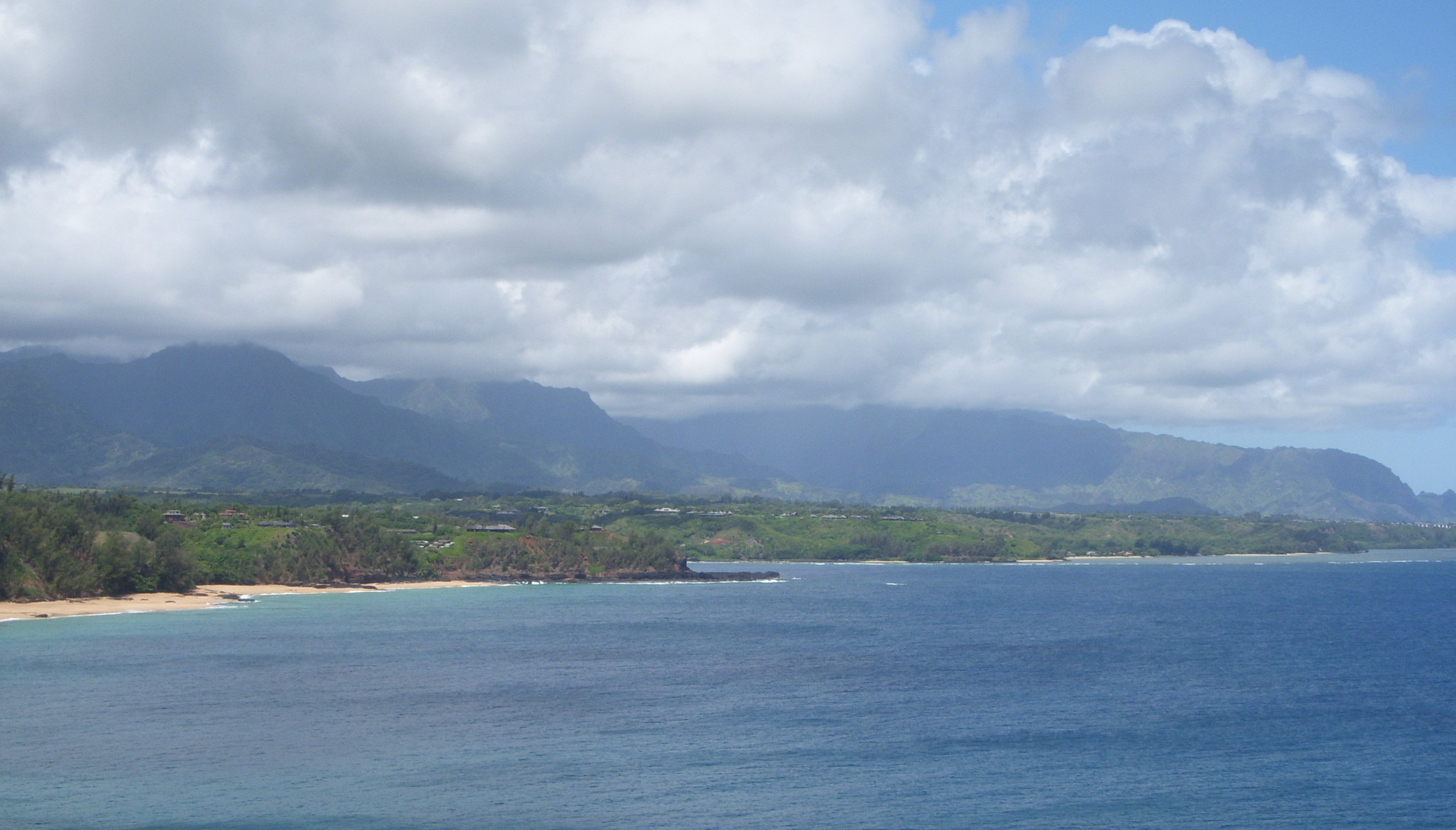
- Princeville from the Kilauea Point National Wildlife Refuge

- Location in Kauaʻi County and the state of Hawaii
- Coordinates: 22°13′25″N 159°29′7″W
- Country: United States
- State: Hawaii
- County: Kauaʻi
- Named for: Prince Albert Kamehameha

Area
  - Total: 2.64 sq mi (6.85 km^{2})
  - Land: 2.60 sq mi (6.74 km^{2})
  - Water: 0.046 sq mi (0.12 km^{2})
- Elevation: 194 ft (59 m)

Population (2020)
  - Total: 2,157
  - Density: 829.2/sq mi (320.17/km^{2})
- Time zone: UTC-10 (Hawaii-Aleutian)
- ZIP codes: 96714, 96722
- Area code: 808
- FIPS code: 15-65075
- GNIS feature ID: 1867259

Princeville is a 9,000-acre (3,600 ha) unincorporated area mostly consisting of master-planned homes, a 27 hole golf course, a hotel and condos on the north shore of the island of Kauaʻi in Kauaʻi County, Hawaii, United States. As of the 2020 census, Princeville had a population of 2,157.

Currently, the community is a Master Planned Development approved by the County of Kauai and is under State of Hawaii and county land use regulations.

== Geography ==
Princeville is bordered to the east by Kalihiwai, to the west by Hanalei, and to the north by the Pacific Ocean. It is the northernmost settlement in the state of Hawaii. For statistical purposes, the United States Census Bureau has defined Princeville as a census-designated place (CDP). The census definition of the area may not precisely correspond to local understanding of the area with the same name.

According to the United States Census Bureau, the Princeville CDP has a total area of 2.5 square miles (6.4 km^{2}), of which 2.4 square miles (6.2 km^{2}) are land and 0.1 square miles (0.2 km^{2}), or 2.60%, are water.

=== Climate ===
The climate of Princeville is a tropical rainforest climate (Köppen: Af.) It is not equatorial.

Climate data for Princeville, Hawaii, 1991–2020 normals, extremes 1999–2017
Month	Jan	Feb	Mar	Apr	May	Jun	Jul	Aug	Sep	Oct	Nov	Dec	Year
Record high °F (°C)	88 (31)	89 (32)	91 (33)	89 (32)	90 (32)	101 (38)	94 (34)	96 (36)	95 (35)	94 (34)	92 (33)	89 (32)	101 (38)
Mean daily maximum °F (°C)	78.4 (25.8)	77.2 (25.1)	76.5 (24.7)	79.6 (26.4)	82.5 (28.1)	83.6 (28.7)	84.8 (29.3)	85.9 (29.9)	84.6 (29.2)	83.0 (28.3)	80.1 (26.7)	77.6 (25.3)	81.2 (27.3)
Daily mean °F (°C)	70.3 (21.3)	69.9 (21.1)	69.9 (21.1)	72.2 (22.3)	74.6 (23.7)	75.8 (24.3)	77.0 (25.0)	77.7 (25.4)	77.1 (25.1)	75.5 (24.2)	73.5 (23.1)	71.3 (21.8)	73.7 (23.2)
Mean daily minimum °F (°C)	62.3 (16.8)	62.6 (17.0)	63.3 (17.4)	64.8 (18.2)	66.7 (19.3)	68.1 (20.1)	69.3 (20.7)	69.5 (20.8)	69.7 (20.9)	68.1 (20.1)	66.9 (19.4)	65.1 (18.4)	66.4 (19.1)
Record low °F (°C)	54 (12)	56 (13)	56 (13)	58 (14)	55 (13)	57 (14)	59 (15)	62 (17)	59 (15)	62 (17)	59 (15)	54 (12)	54 (12)
Average precipitation inches (mm)	5.43 (138)	6.63 (168)	8.26 (210)	5.60 (142)	5.10 (130)	5.01 (127)	5.42 (138)	6.29 (160)	5.54 (141)	6.43 (163)	7.43 (189)	8.03 (204)	75.17 (1,910)
Average precipitation days (≥ 0.01 in)	17.7	16.7	20.9	22.8	21.3	24.9	26.4	25.8	22.4	22.6	22.5	21.8	265.8
Source 1: NOAA
Source 2: National Weather Service

== History ==
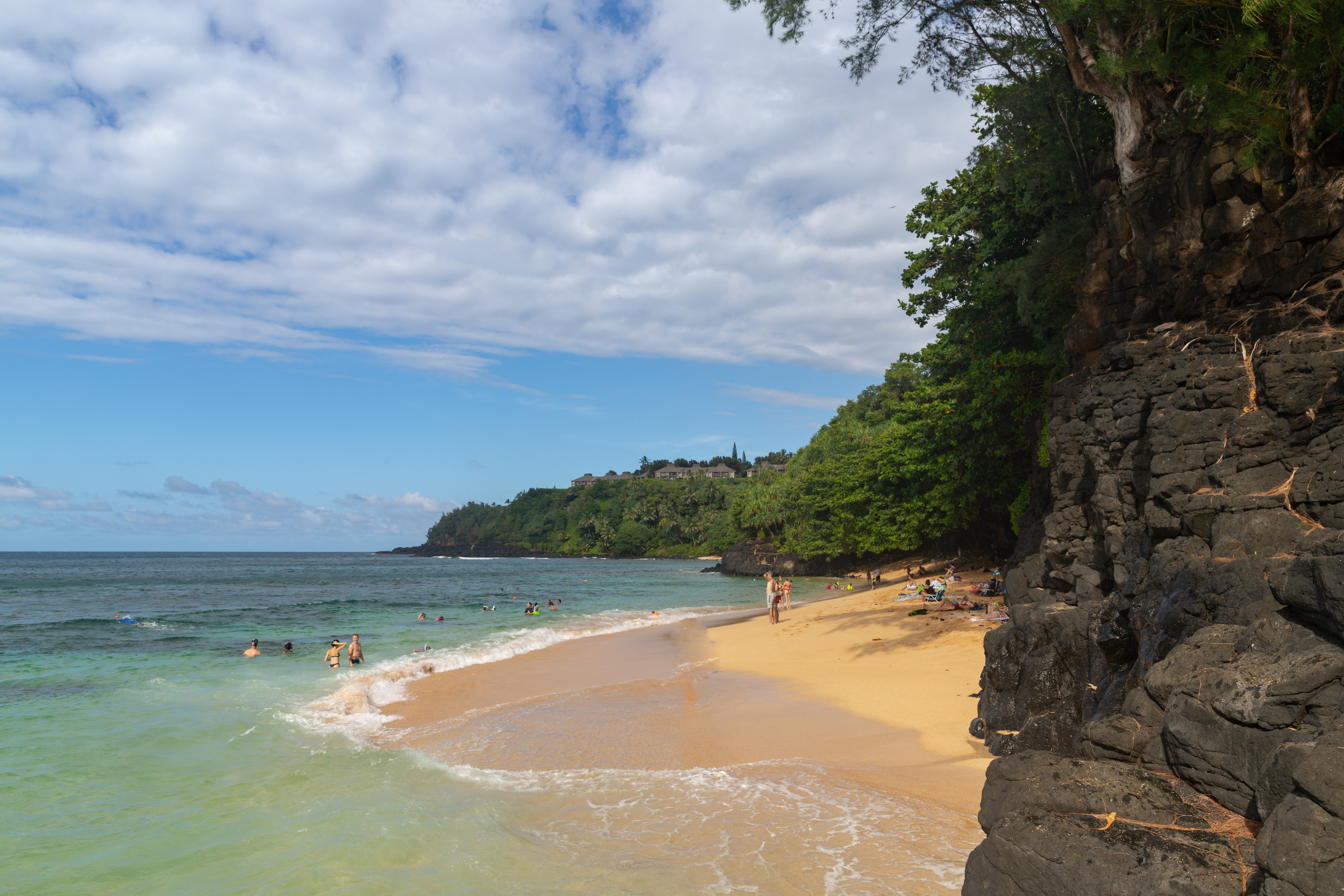
Hideaways Beach, Princeville

This region was part of the Crown Lands following the Great Māhele. There was no private property prior to the Māhele, but in 1842 the land had been leased by the governor of Kauai to Godfrey Rhodes and John Bernard for a coffee plantation and this lease of Crown Lands was sold to Robert Crichton Wyllie in 1853. The area was named in honor of an 1860 visit by Prince Albert Kamehameha, son of King Kamehameha IV and Queen Emma. It was then a plantation leased by Robert Crichton Wyllie. He named another part of the plantation "Emmaville", but that name never stuck.

Originally the land was planted with coffee, which was not suited to the wet lowlands. It was then planted with sugarcane. Wyllie's nephew Robert Crichton Cochran inherited the land on the condition he would adopt the Wyllie surname, but he died by suicide on February 7, 1866. In 1867, it was purchased by Elisha Hunt Allen and later became a cattle ranch. It was sold for development in 1968 and became a golf course and resort called "Princeville at Hanalei".

== Demographics ==
Historical population
Census	Pop.	Note	%±
2020	2,157		—
U.S. Decennial Census

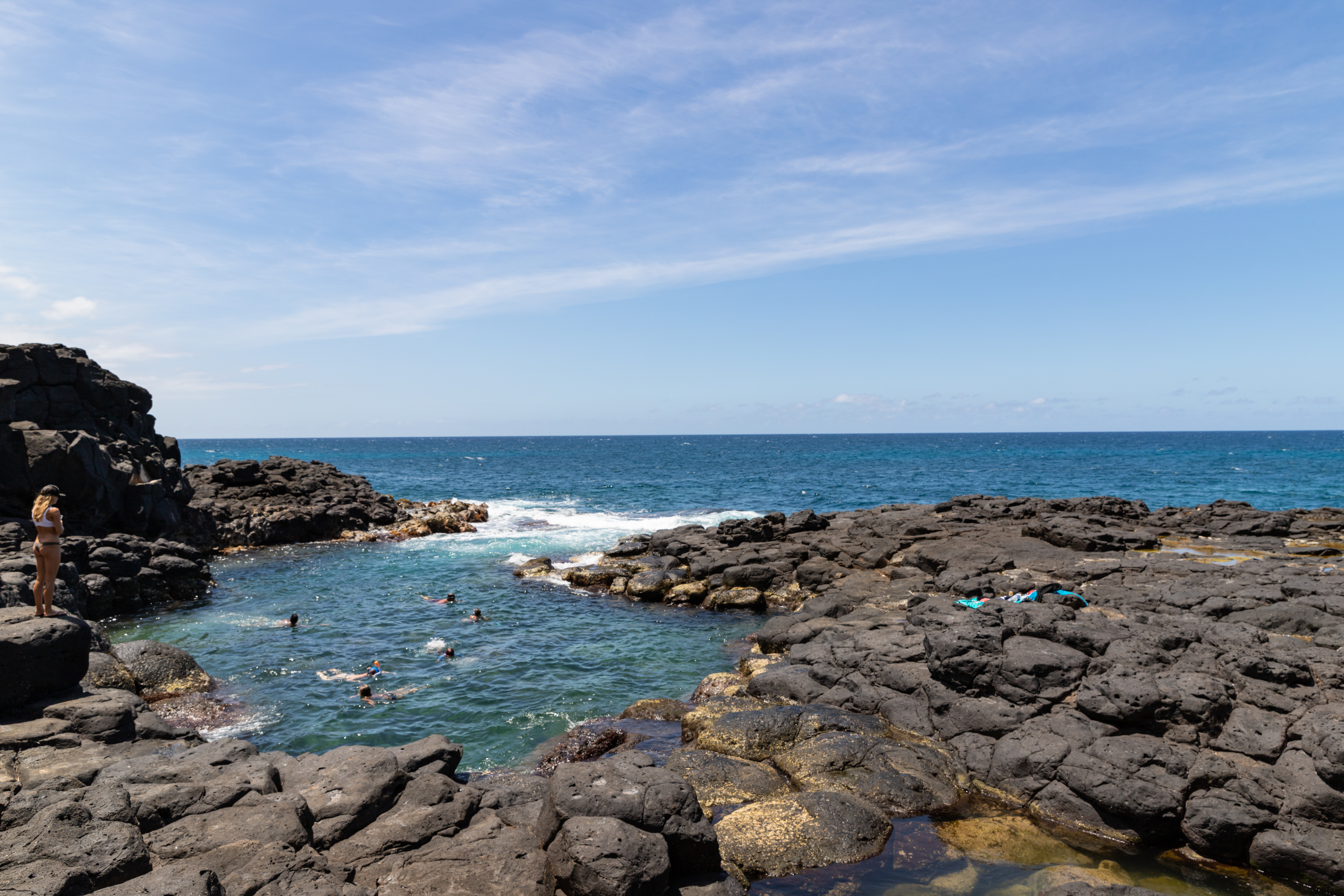
Queen's Bath, Princeville

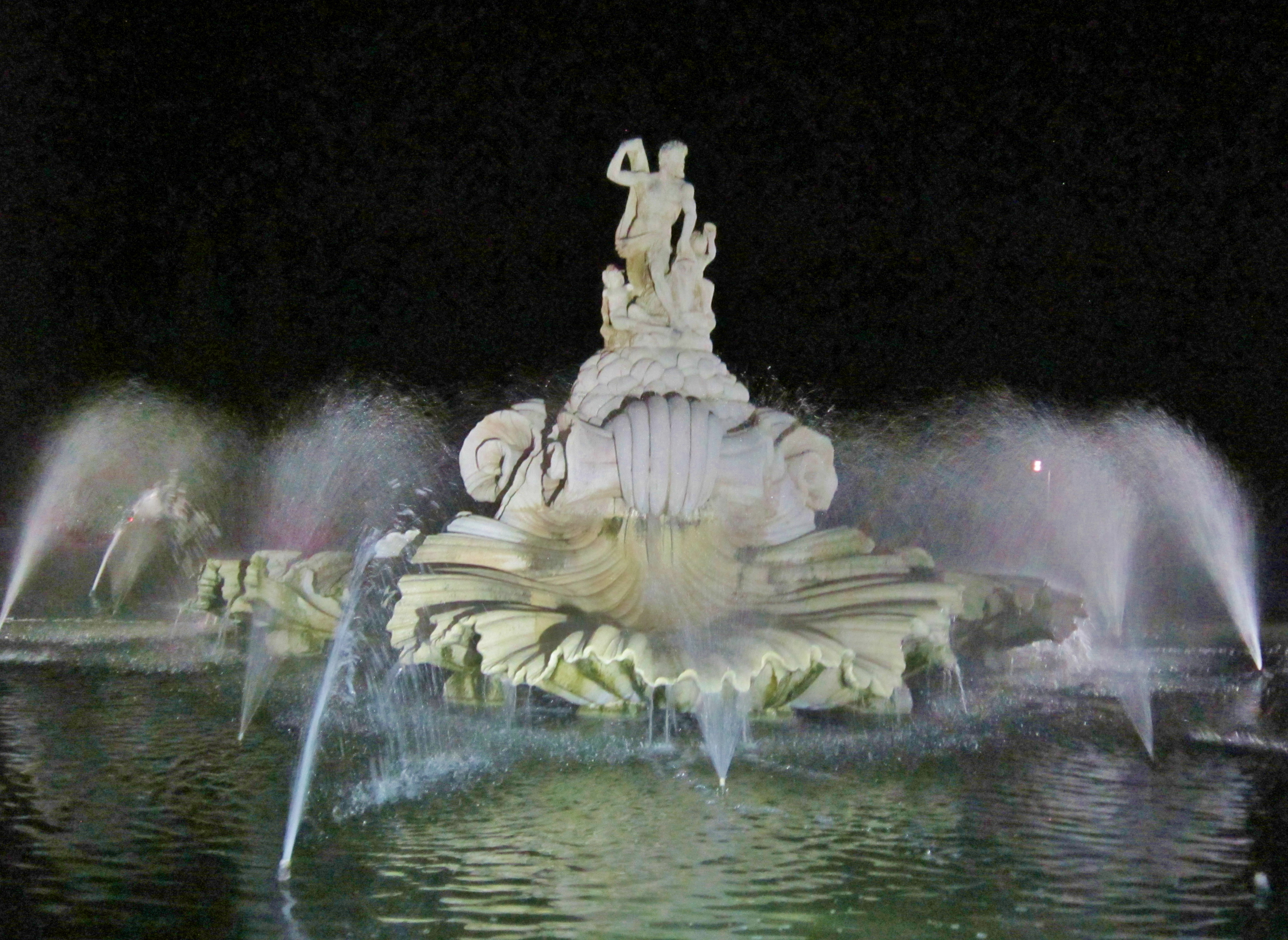
The Princeville roundabout statue at night

=== 2020 census ===
As of the 2020 census, Princeville had a population of 2,157. The median age was 54.8 years. 16.4% of residents were under the age of 18 and 34.0% of residents were 65 years of age or older. For every 100 females there were 90.9 males, and for every 100 females age 18 and over there were 90.3 males age 18 and over.

99.2% of residents lived in urban areas, while 0.8% lived in rural areas.

There were 969 households in Princeville, of which 21.9% had children under the age of 18 living in them. Of all households, 50.3% were married-couple households, 16.0% were households with a male householder and no spouse or partner present, and 25.1% were households with a female householder and no spouse or partner present. About 26.1% of all households were made up of individuals and 14.5% had someone living alone who was 65 years of age or older.

There were 2,502 housing units, of which 61.3% were vacant. The homeowner vacancy rate was 2.9% and the rental vacancy rate was 45.6%.

Racial composition as of the 2020 census
Race	Number	Percent
White	1,678	77.8%
Black or African American	15	0.7%
American Indian and Alaska Native	1	0.0%
Asian	116	5.4%
Native Hawaiian and Other Pacific Islander	32	1.5%
Some other race	52	2.4%
Two or more races	263	12.2%
Hispanic or Latino (of any race)	153	7.1%

=== 2000 census ===
As of the 2000 census, there were 1,698 people, 752 households, and 491 families residing in the CDP. The population density was 806.7 inhabitants per square mile (311.5/km^{2}). There were 1,640 housing units at an average density of 779.1 per square mile (300.8/km^{2}). The racial makeup of the CDP was 81.3% White, 0.3% African American, 0.5% Native American, 4.6% Asian, 3.4% Pacific Islander, 1.0% from other races, and 9.0% from two or more races. Hispanic or Latino of any race were 4.0% of the population.

There were 752 households, out of which 23.4% had children under the age of 18 living with them, 53.5% were married couples living together, 9.2% had a female householder with no husband present, and 34.7% were non-families. 26.1% of all households were made up of individuals, and 6.6% had someone living alone who was 65 years of age or older. The average household size was 2.26 and the average family size was 2.70.

In the CDP, the population was distributed by age as follows: 19.3% under 18, 3.4% aged 18 to 24, 25.3% aged 25 to 44, 35.6% aged 45 to 64, and 16.4% aged 65 or older. The median age was 46 years. There were 100.7 males for every 100 females, and among those aged 18 and over, there were 100.3 males per 100 females.

The median income for a household in the CDP was $63,833, and the median income for a family was $67,266. Males had a median income of $48,229 versus $29,542 for females. The per capita income for the CDP was $37,971. About 7.4% of families and 8.1% of the population were below the poverty line, including 11.5% of those under age 18 and 4.3% of those age 65 or over.

== Education ==
Hawaii has one statewide school district, Hawaii Department of Education.

The Hawaii State Public Library System operates the Princeville Library. This library began operations on April 14, 1999.

== See also ==
- Legacy of Prince Albert Kamehameha
- Queen's Bath
