= Queen's Bath =

Tide pool and springs, Kauaʻi, Hawaii

Coordinates: 22°13′44.9″N 159°29′15.0″W

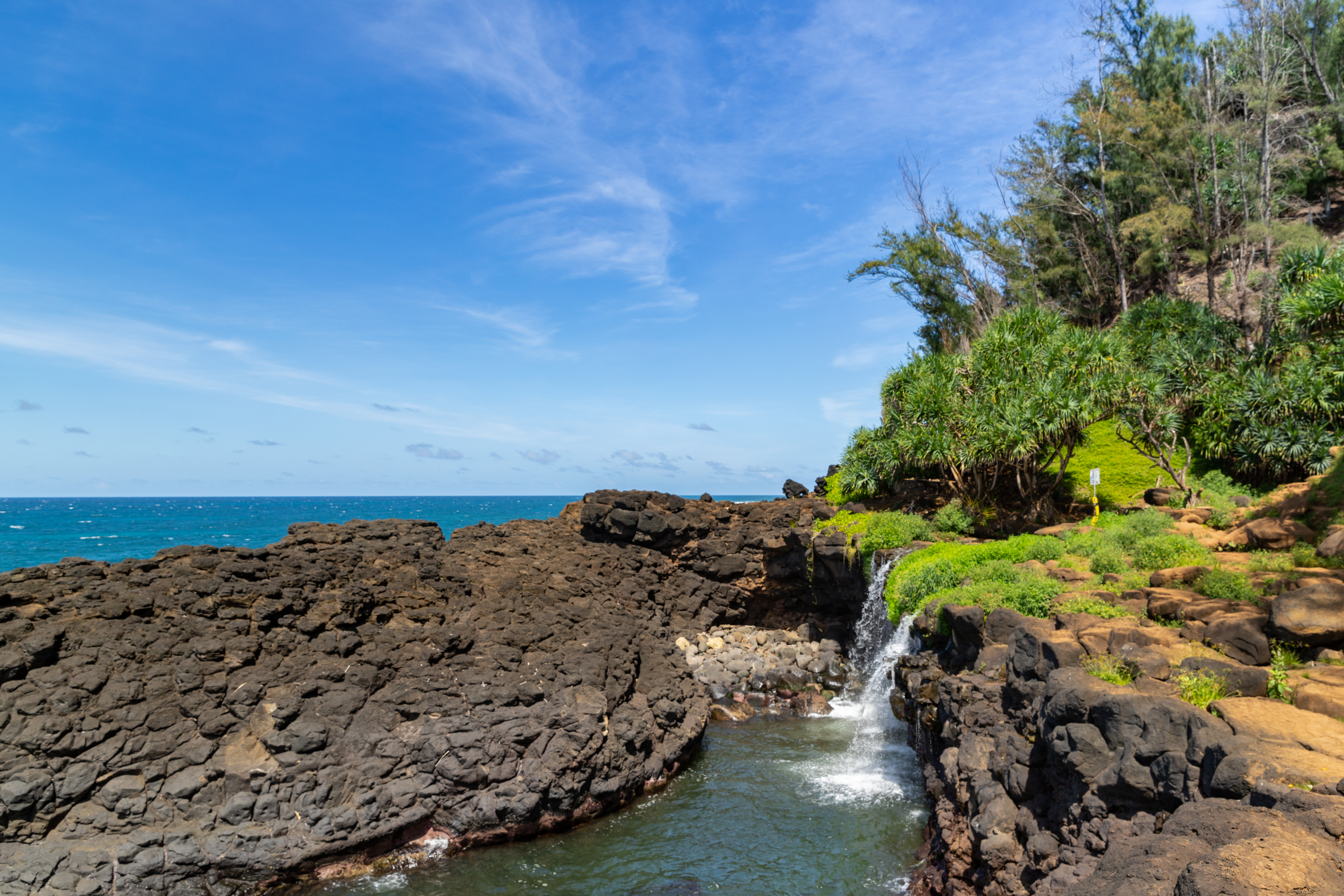
Waterfall in Queen's Bath, Kauaʻi, Hawaii

The Queen's Bath is an ocean pool on the island of Kauaʻi, Hawaii. It is formed by lava rock and is next to multiple lagoons. It is located on the north shore of Kauaʻi in the town of Princeville. Small fish and other sea creatures live inside the bath, while green sea turtles are a common sight in the surrounding waters. The site is considered to be dangerous and a number of drownings have occurred there.

== Safety concerns and recreational use ==
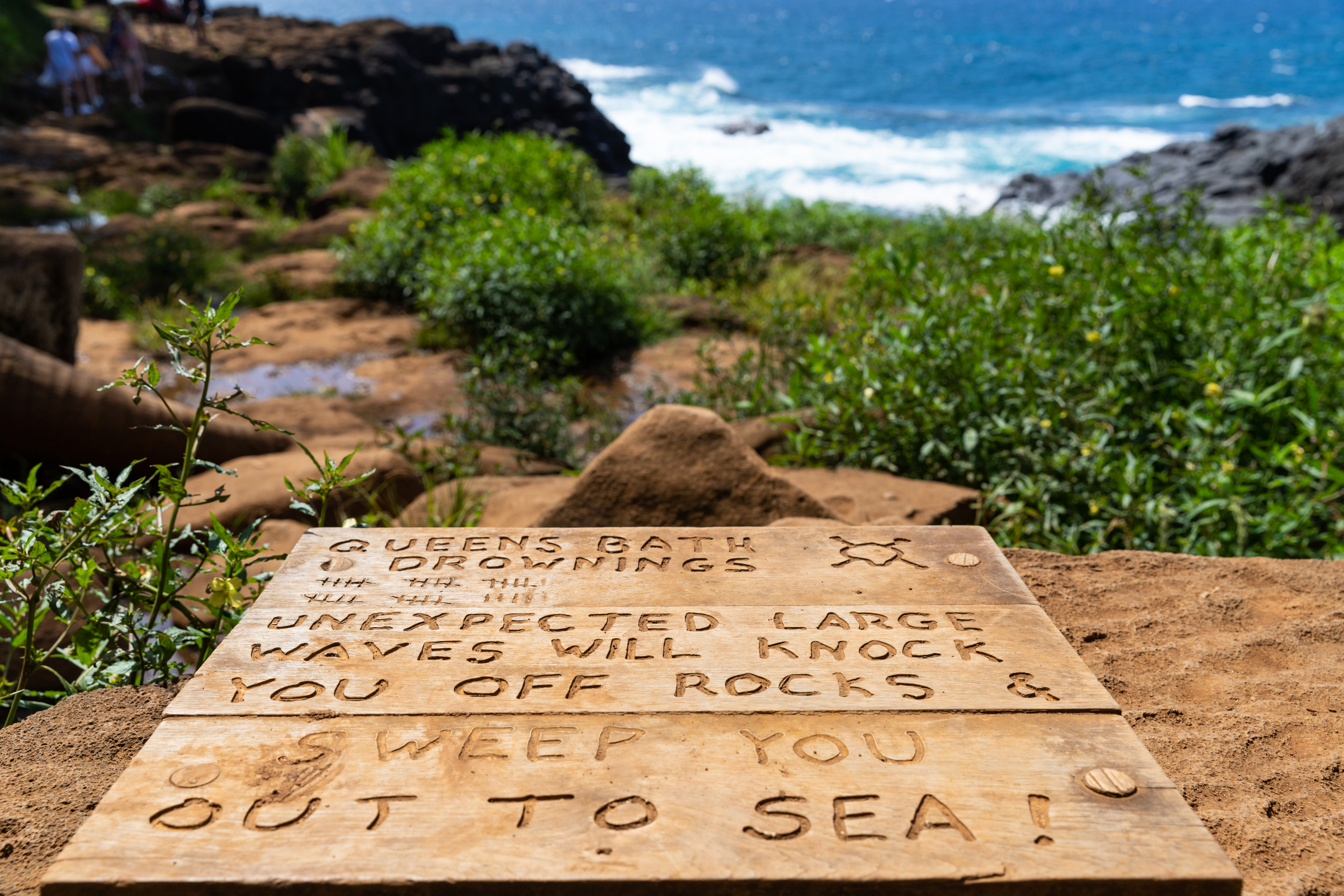
Sign warning visitors about drownings

The site is accessible via a trail. According to Honolulu Civil Beat, the Princeville at Hanalei Community Association has gone to significant lengths to discourage and prevent visitors from visiting the site, including fencing and warnings, due to the danger of people being swept away by waves, and there have been "countless rescues" of visitors to the site. As of May 2024, at least 10 people had died at the site. The death toll sign at the bottom of the trail, indicating 28 drownings, was created by concerned citizens and is not an official county sign reflecting the actual number of drownings.

== History ==
Queen's Bath used to be called Keanalele and known for a mound with the most concentrated complex petroglyphs in Hawai'i.

The original "Queen's Bath" was located in Kalapana on the Big Island of Hawaiʻi. It was formed after a lava tube collapsed and filled with fresh water supplied by natural springs. In ancient times only the Aliʻi (Royalty) were permitted entry to the sacred waters. In 1983 Kilauea erupted and in 1987 the original site was destroyed by lava flow. Only after the original site on the Big Island of Hawaiʻi was destroyed did the location on Kauai become better known as "Queen's Bath".
