= Dogashima =

Coastal area in Japan

Coordinates: 34°46′N 138°45′E

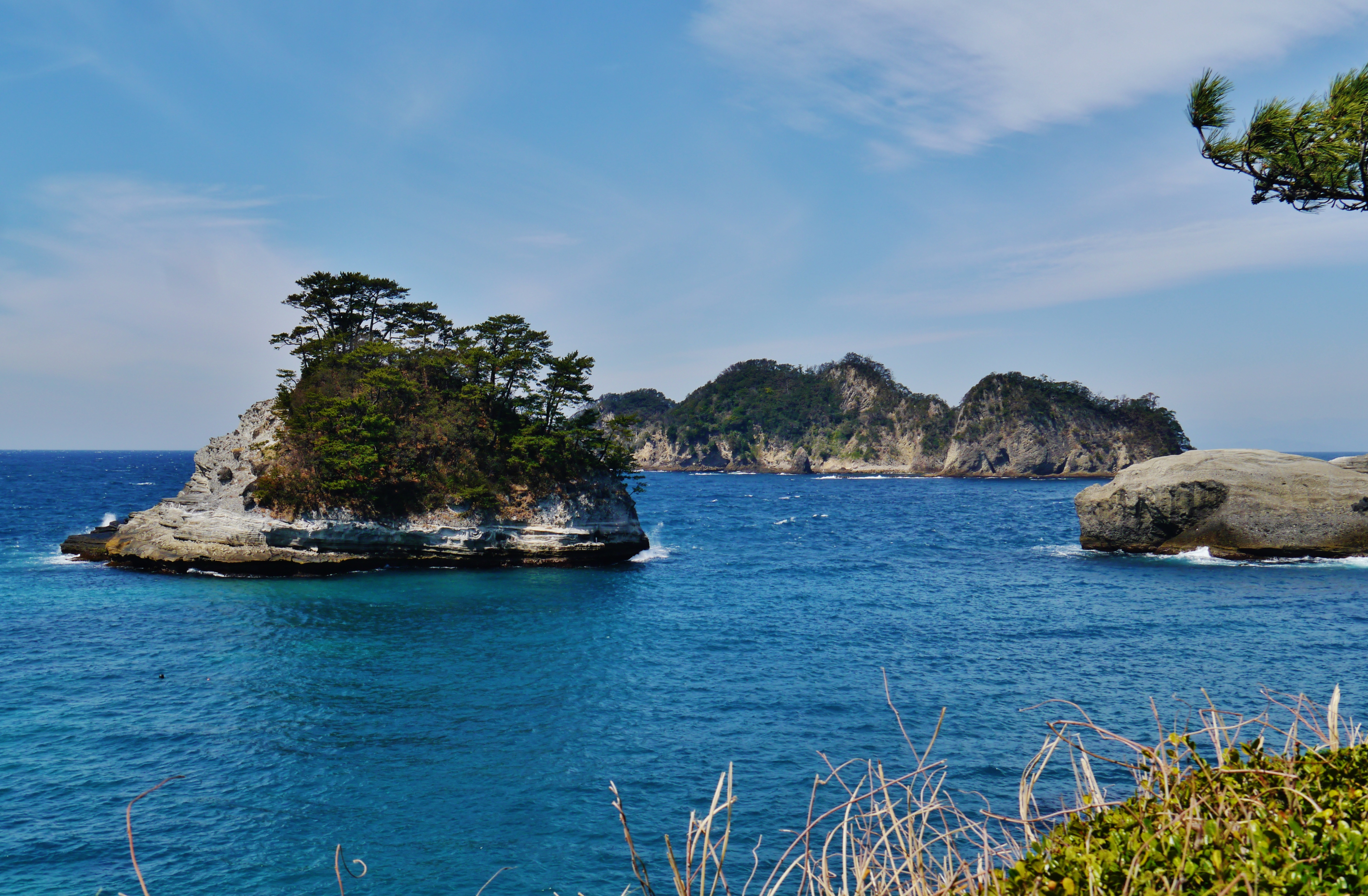
View of Jajima Island (left) with the Sanshiro Islands in the background.

Dogashima (堂ヶ島, Dōgashima) is a scenic coastal area in Nishiizu, Japan. It is also known as "Izu's Matsushima" due to the beauty of its scenery which features pumice cliffs, volcanic rock formations, sea caves, and uninhabited islands.

== Geology and topography ==
The pumice cliffs around Dogashima were deposited by subaqueous volcaniclastic currents which came from the explosive eruption of an underwater lava dome.

=== Tensodo Cave ===
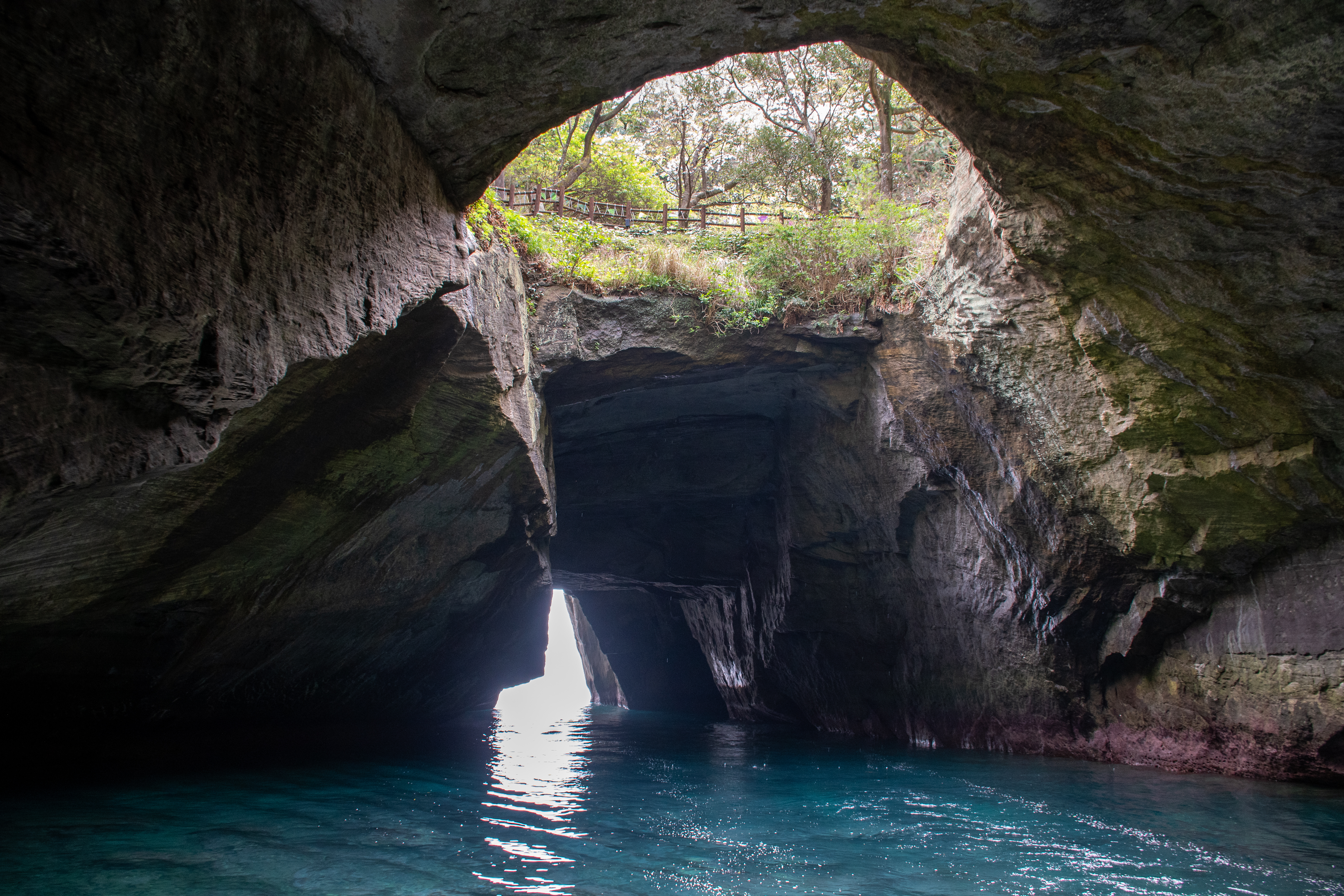
Tensodo Sea Cave Skylight

Tensodo Cave (天窓洞, tensōdō) is named after the skylight (tensō) that was created when the ceiling of the sea cave collapsed. There is a promenade around the skylight, allowing visitors to view the hole from above. Boat cruises regularly travel through the cave as well. It was designated as a Natural Monument (天然記念物, tennen kinenbutsu) in 1935.

=== Tombolo ===
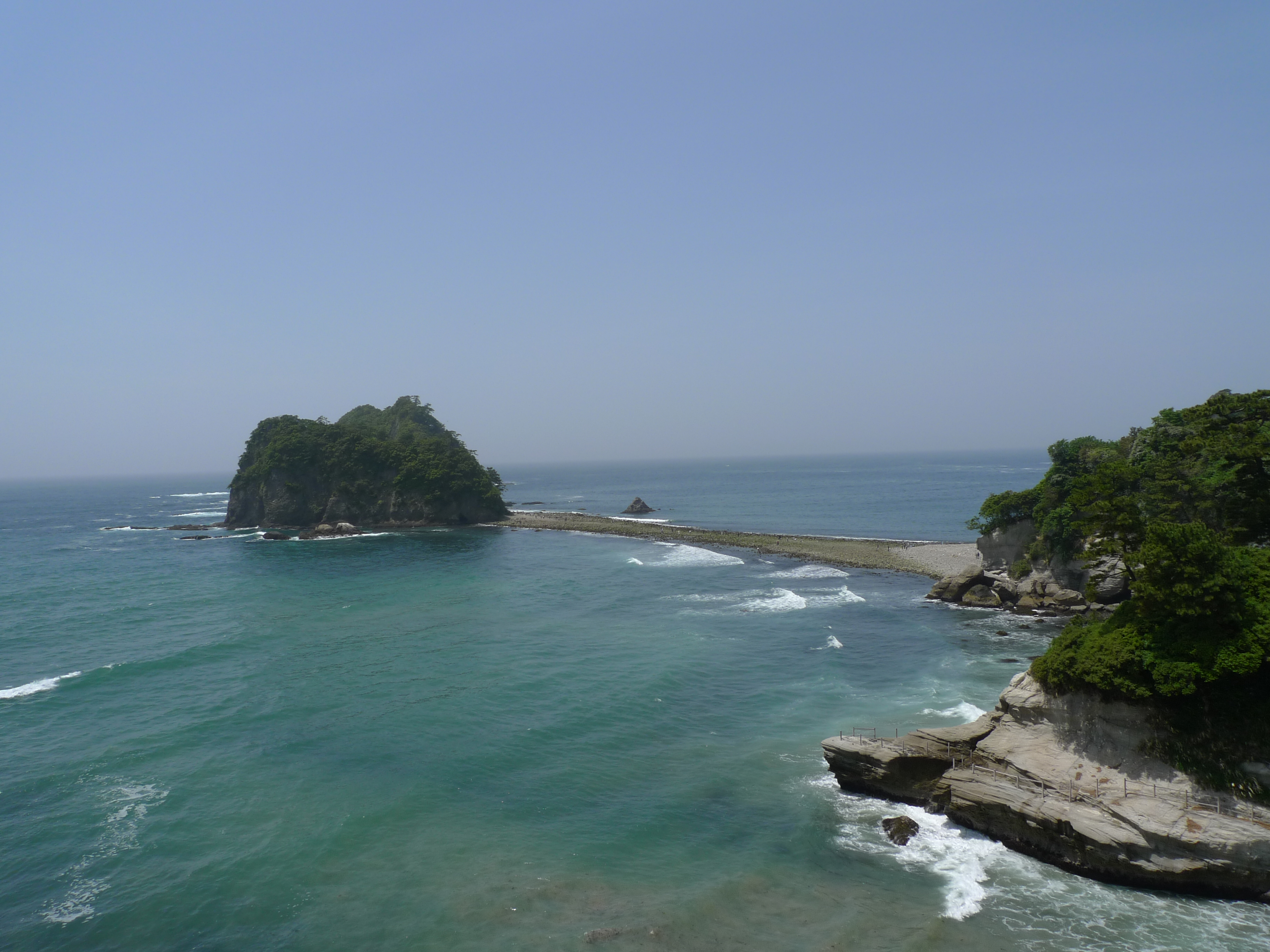
Tombolo seen from Dogashima Park

A narrow, rocky strip of land (a tombolo) connects Hamase Beach with the Sanshiro Islands at low tide.
