= Sea cave =

Cave formed by the wave action of the sea

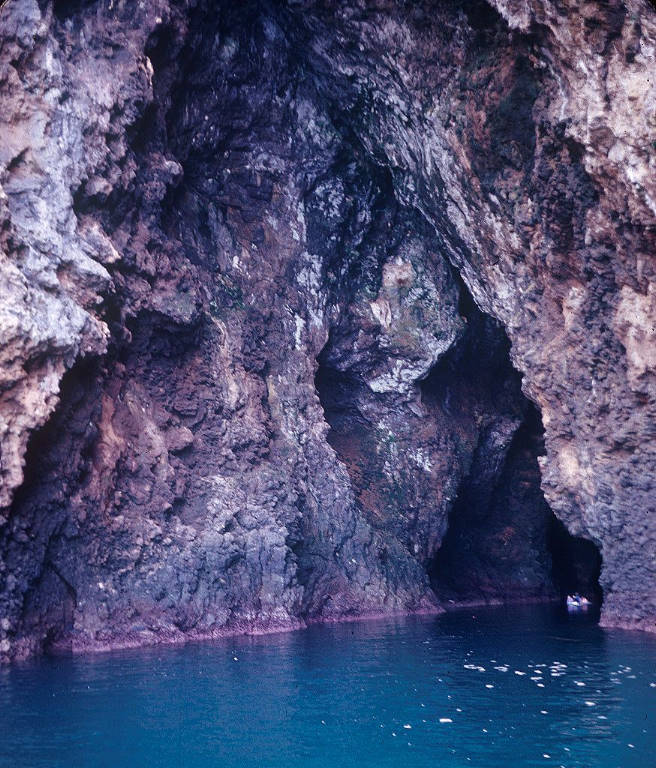
Sea cave formation along a fault on Santa Cruz Island, California, United States

A sea cave or littoral cave is a type of cave formed primarily by the wave action of the sea. The primary process involved is erosion. Sea caves are found throughout the world, actively forming along present coastlines and as relict sea caves on former coastlines. Some of the largest wave-cut caves in the world are found on the coast of Norway, but are now 100 feet or more above present sea level. These would still be classified as littoral caves. By contrast, in places like Thailand's Phang Nga Bay, solutionally formed caves in limestone have been flooded by the rising sea and are now subject to littoral erosion, representing a new phase of their enlargement.

Some of the best-known sea caves are European. Fingal's Cave, on the island of Staffa in Scotland, is a spacious cave some 70 m long, formed in columnar basalt. The Blue Grotto of Capri, although smaller, is famous for the apparent luminescent quality of its water, imparted by light passing through underwater openings. The Romans built a stairway in its rear and a now-collapsed tunnel to the surface. The Greek islands are also noted for the variety and beauty of their sea caves. Numerous sea caves have been surveyed in England, Scotland, and in France, particularly on the Normandy coast. Until 2013, the largest known sea caves were found along the west coast of the United States, the Hawaiian islands, and the Shetland Islands. In 2013 the discovery and survey of the world's largest sea cave was announced. Matainaka Cave – located on the Otago coast of New Zealand's South Island – has proven to be the world's most extensive at 1.5 km in length. Also in 2013, Crossley reported a newly surveyed complex reaching just over a kilometer in survey at Bethells Beach on New Zealand's North Island.

== Formation ==
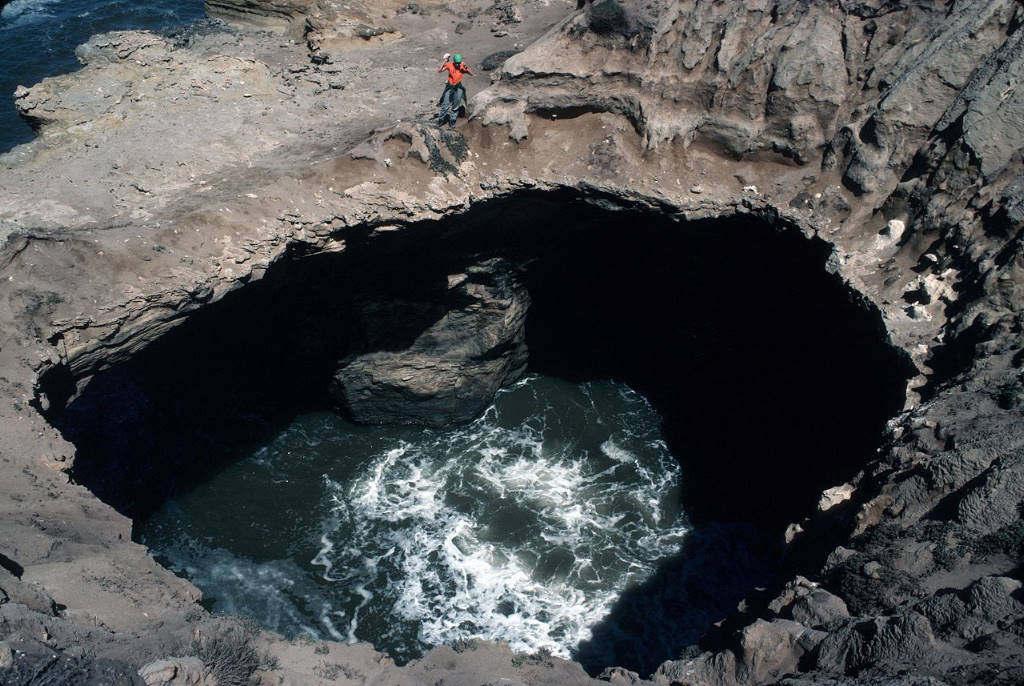
Littoral cave collapse

Littoral caves may be found in a wide variety of host rocks, ranging from sedimentary to metamorphic to igneous, but caves in the latter tend to be larger due to the greater strength of the host rock. However, there are some notable exceptions as discussed below.

In order to form a sea cave, the host rock must first contain a weak zone. In metamorphic or igneous rock, this is typically either a fault as in the caves of the Channel Islands of California, or a dike as in the large sea caves of Kauai, Hawaii’s Na Pali Coast. In sedimentary rocks, this may be a bedding-plane parting or a contact between layers of different hardness. The latter may also occur in igneous rocks, such as in the caves on Santa Cruz Island, California, where waves have attacked the contact between the andesitic basalt and the agglomerate.

The driving force in littoral cave development is wave action. Erosion is ongoing anywhere that waves batter rocky coasts, but where sea cliffs contain zones of weakness, rock is removed at a greater rate along these zones. As the sea reaches into the fissures thus formed, they begin to widen and deepen due to the tremendous force exerted within a confined space, not only by direct action of the surf and any rock particles that it bears, but also by compression of air within. Blowholes (partially submerged caves that eject large sprays of sea water as waves retreat and allow rapid re-expansion of air compressed within) attest to this process. Adding to the hydraulic power of the waves is the abrasive force of suspended sand and rock. Most sea-cave walls are irregular and chunky, reflecting an erosional process where the rock is fractured piece by piece. However, some caves have portions where the walls are rounded and smoothed, typically floored with cobbles, and result from the swirling motion of these cobbles in the surf zone.

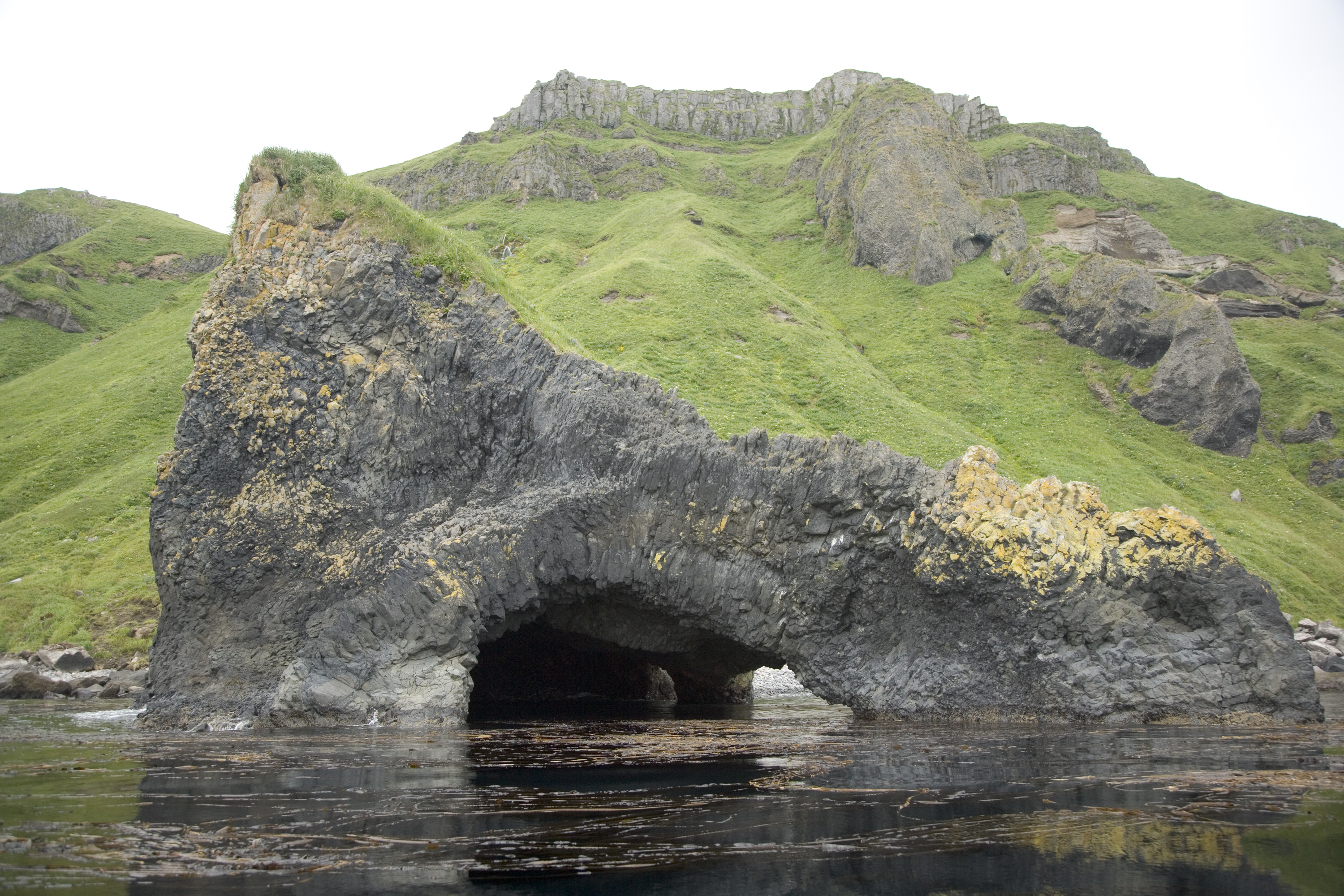
Akun Island basalt sea cave

True littoral caves should not be confused with inland caves that have been intersected and revealed when a sea cliff line is eroded back, or with dissolutional voids formed in the littoral zone on tropical islands. In some regions, such as Halong Bay, Vietnam, caves in carbonate rocks are found in littoral zones, and being enlarged by littoral processes but were originally formed by dissolution. Such caves have been termed as hybrid caves.

Rainwater may also influence sea-cave formation. Carbonic and organic acids leached from the soil may assist in weakening rock within fissures. As in solutional caves, small speleothems may develop in sea caves.

Sea cave chambers sometimes collapse leaving a "littoral sinkhole". These may be quite large, such as Oregon’s Devils Punch Bowl or the Queen's Bath on the Na Pali coast. Small peninsulas or headlands often have caves that cut completely through them, since they are subject to attack from both sides, and the collapse of a sea cave tunnel can leave a free-standing "sea stack" along the coast. The Californian island of Anacapa is thought to have been split into three islets by such a process.

Life within sea caves may assist in their enlargement as well. For example, sea urchins drill their way into the rock, and over successive generations may remove considerable bedrock from the floors and lower walls.

== Factors influencing size ==
Most sea caves are small in relation to solutionaly formed caves, but a compilation of sea-cave surveys as of February 2026 shows 3 over 1000 meters, 10 over 400 meters, 18 over 300 meters, and 45 over 200 meters in length. In Norway, several relict sea caves exceed 300 meters in length and are unusually voluminous. There is no doubt that many other large sea caves exist but have not been investigated due to their remote locations and/or hostile sea conditions.

Several factors contribute to the development of relatively large sea caves. The nature of the zone of weakness itself is surely a factor, although difficult to quantify. A more readily observed factor is the situation of the cave's entrance relative to prevailing sea conditions. At Santa Cruz Island, the largest caves face into the prevailing northwest swell conditions—a factor which also makes them more difficult to survey. Caves in well-protected bays sheltered from prevailing seas and winds tend to be smaller, as are caves in areas where the seas tend to be calmer.

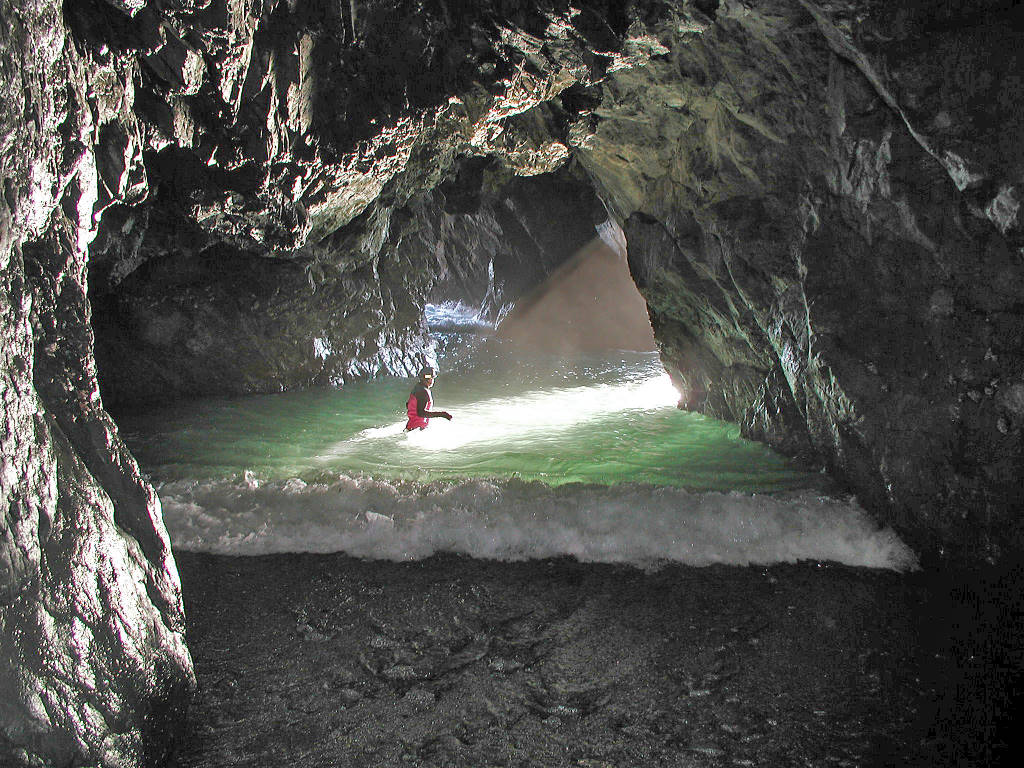
Exploring a sea cave

The type of host rock is important as well. Most of the large sea caves on the Western U.S. coast and Hawaii are in basalt, a strong host rock compared to sedimentary rock. Basaltic caves can penetrate far into cliffs where most of the surface erodes relatively slowly. In weaker rock, erosion along a weaker zone may not greatly outstrip that of the cliff face. However, the world's largest sea cave has formed in the heavily fractured Caversham sandstone (Barth, 2013) changing our understanding of which host rocks can form large sea caves.

Time is another factor. The active littoral zone changes throughout geological time by an interplay between sea-level change and regional uplift. Recurrent ice ages during the Pleistocene have changed sea levels within a vertical range of some 200 meters. Significant sea caves have formed in the California Channel Islands that are now totally submerged by the rise in sea levels over the last 12 000 years. In regions of steady uplift, continual littoral erosion may produce sea caves of great height — Painted Cave is almost 40 m high at its entrance. On the Norwegian coast there are unusually voluminous sea caves now uplifted 30 or more meters above sea level. Sediment dating in the largest of these (Halvikshulen in Osen, 340 m long) shows that it was formed over a period of at least a million years. Indeed its entrance, measuring 722 feet in width, is among the largest of any type of cave. The largest known sea cave by volume, based on a survey, is Rikoriko Cave in the Poor Knights Islands in New Zealand with 221,494 m^{3}.

Finally, caves that are larger tend to be more complex. By far the majority of sea caves consist of a single passage or chamber. Those formed on faults tend to have canyon-like or angled passages that are very straight. In Seal Canyon Cave on Santa Cruz Island, entrance light is still visible from the back of the cave 189 m from the entrance. By contrast, caves formed along horizontal bedding planes tend to be wider with lower ceiling heights. In some areas, sea caves may have dry upper levels, lifted above the active littoral zone by regional uplift.

Sea caves can prove surprisingly complex where numerous zones of weakness—often faults—converge. In Catacombs Cave on Anacapa Island (California), at least six faults intersect. In several caves of the Californian Channel Islands, long fissure passages open up into large chambers beyond. This is invariably associated with intersection of a second fault oriented almost perpendicularly to that along the entrance passage. When caves have multiple entrances, they are exposed to more wave action and hence may grow relatively faster. There is an exceptionally large cave underlying the Fogla Skerry, an islet off the coast of Papa Stour, in the Shetland Islands. Though unsurveyed, estimates place it at almost 500 m of passage. Matainaka Cave in New Zealand has 12 separate entrances into which waves can penetrate and numerous joints along which intersecting passages have developed.

== Bibliography ==
- Bunnell, D.E. & Kovarik, J.L. (2013). "Littoral Cave Development on the Western U.S. Coast". In Lace, M.J. & Mylroie, J.E.. (eds.). Coastal Karst Landforms. New York: Springer. ISBN 978-94-007-5015-9.
