= Polihale State Park =

State park in Hawaii, United States

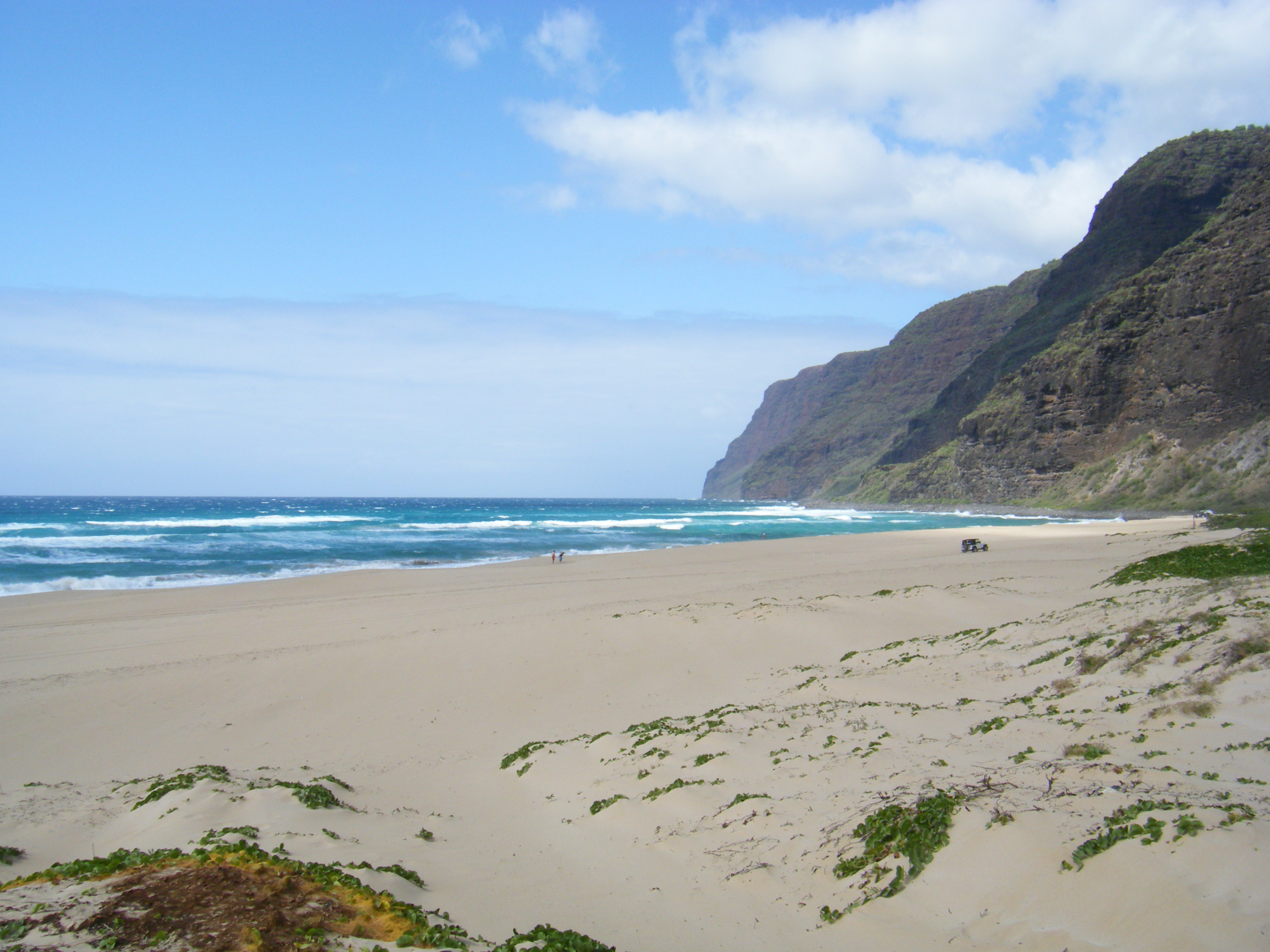
- Polihale Beach facing north

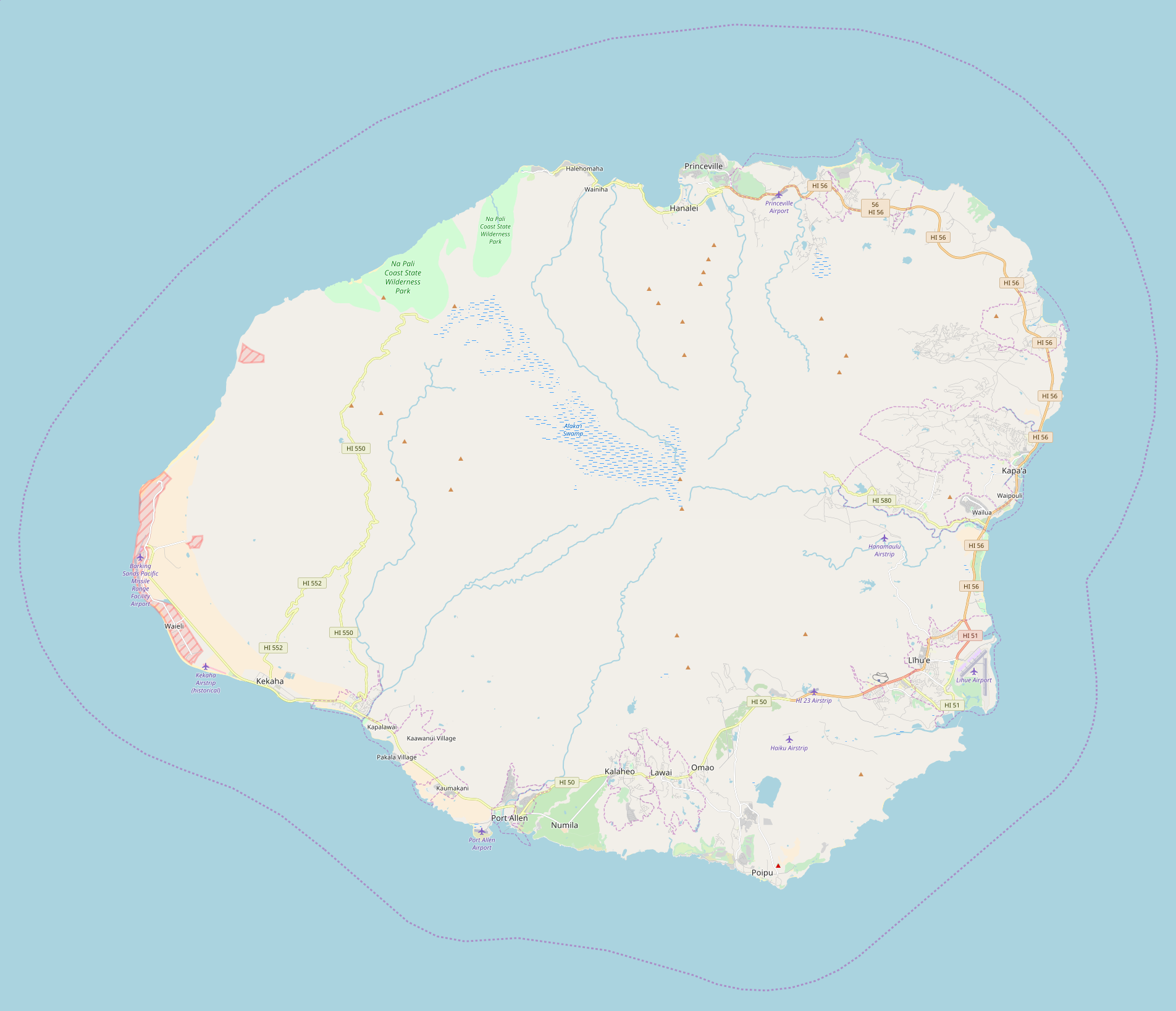
- Location within Kauai Location within Hawaii
- Nearest city: Kekaha
- Coordinates: 22°5′33″N 159°45′00″W
- Website: hawaiistateparks.org/parks/kauai/polihale-state-park/

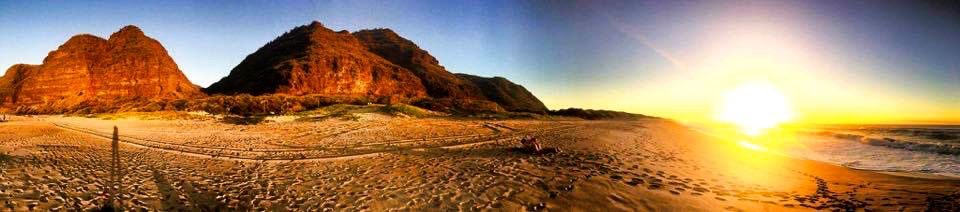
Polihale State Park at Sunset

Polihale State Park is a remote wild beach on the western side of the Hawaiian island of Kauaʻi. It is the most western publicly accessible area in Hawaii, although the privately owned island of Niʻihau is farther west. The park is miles away from the town of Kekaha, and it can only be reached via a poorly marked, dirt sugarcane road, making a four-wheel drive vehicle preferable. The beach is several miles long, yet only the area known as "Queen's Pond" offers safe swimming.

== Location ==
The park is located at the western end of Kauai and has many miles of shoreline that averages about 300 feet from the barrier dunes to the surf line. Sand dunes along the beach can reach heights nearing 100 feet. Driving on the beach is no longer permitted.< https://dlnr.hawaii.gov/dsp/parks/kauai/polihale-state-park/> The only road to the park is dirt, with many ruts and potholes, and is difficult to access by non-4WD vehicles. The park is located to the north of the Pacific Missile Range Facility and Barking Sands Beach. The beach is flanked to the north by the Na Pali Coast mountain ridges. On the east side park is adjacent to the field used for agriculture, that is in turn adjacent to the mountain ridge. Mountains are so close that at night park visitors can hear goats bleating on this ridge. Road access is west from the town of Kekaha.

The park is the terminus for Kauai's road network on the western side of the island, and it is not possible to proceed overland further along the coast, either by vehicle or on foot. The Nā Pali Coast between Polihale Beach and Kalalau Beach can only be accessed by boat or helicopter. Kayak trips being a popular way to travel along this stretch of the coast, however, because of the direction of the ocean current, most kayak trips are one way and end at Polihale Beach.

== Facilities ==
The park has running cold water, flush toilets, simple semi-private showers and a few pavilions. Visitors to the park should bring additional water, food, an umbrella or other shade apparatus and all supplies they feel they need. Nothing is available for purchase anywhere in the park. There is no medical facility or lifeguard available. Most of the year, especially during the Hawaiian Summer (March to October) the sun is extremely intense and there is no place to find shade.

== Activities ==
Except for the usual water-related activities the park is officially open to campers. Swimming is safe only at the Queens Pond, located toward the southern end of the park. This is a wild beach. The shore is unprotected from the open ocean. The usual surfing, snorkeling, etc. are not safe activities along this beach. The beach drops off rapidly to deep water and rip currents along the shore are very strong, especially in the winter months.

== History and mythology ==
This beach is said to have a strong basis in Hawaiian mythology.

Unofficially, Polihale has been incorrectly translated in many instances as the "House of the Po", where Po is the Hawaiian afterworld. By this account, spirits are said to travel to the coastal plain adjacent to the beach, and stay in the temple, known as the heiau. From there, they would climb the cliffs to the north, jump off into the sea to get to the mythical Po. The story further indicates that this belief was so strong that all the homes built in the vicinity of Polihale would have had no east facing doors, so that no traveling spirit could become trapped within.

The foregoing story, however, offers an erroneous translation of the place name. The name "Polihale" literally translates as "House Bosom". The root Po refers to the original night/darkness from which creation is manifested. Po in this case is the "source"; poli, is literally "bosom" or "breast", revealing the word's root in the concept of "source of life". "Polihale" should not be literally translated as "bosom house", but "house bosom".

A sea lettuce called pahapaha grows in the waters near Polihale. A wreath made from pahapaha can fade and dry out, but when soaked in water, it will revive to its original freshness. Only the pahapaha from Polihale does this. According to mythology, Na-maka-o-Kaha'i, sister of Pele and Goddess of the Ocean, blessed Polihale's pahapaha with this special quality. Visitors once took home wreaths made from pahapaha from Polihale to prove they had indeed been there.

== Road to Polihale ==
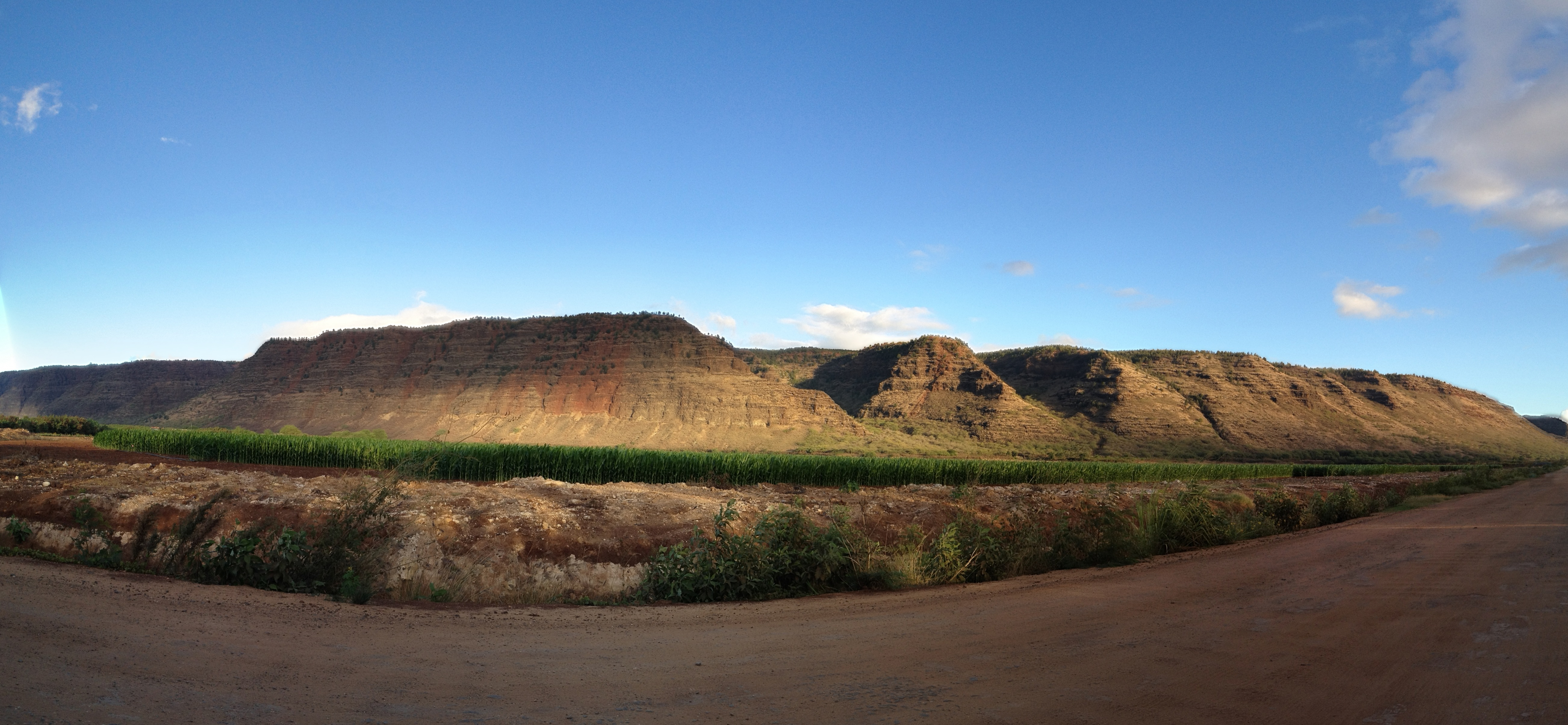
The ridge enclosing ‘Ohai‘ula Valley as seen from the road to Polihale

In December 2008 flooding damaged facilities and closed the access road. With the park site closed and fearing the economic impact, numerous local residents and businesses volunteered to repair the road on their own rather than wait for the government to take action. The cost had been estimated at $4 million, an amount that the Department of Land and Natural Resources did not have budgeted, with repair time estimated at one to two years. On March 23, 2009, local volunteer residents and private businesses began repairing the road on their own and completed the job eight days later.

As of March 25, 2011 the road to the park prefers a 4-wheel drive vehicle but a car is passable to the parking area. If it rains the road will be impassible to non-4wd.

== Gallery ==
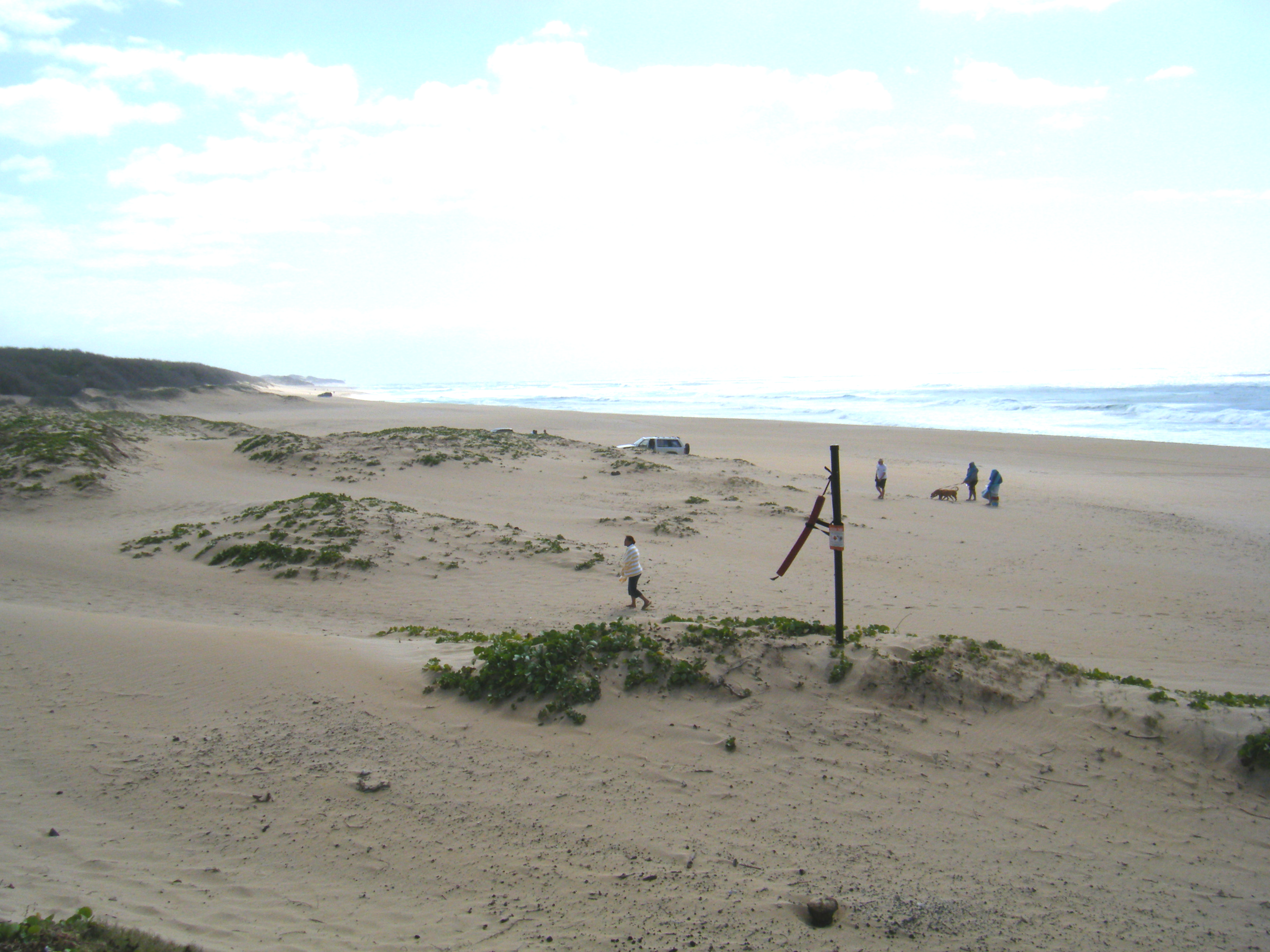
Polihale Beach facing south

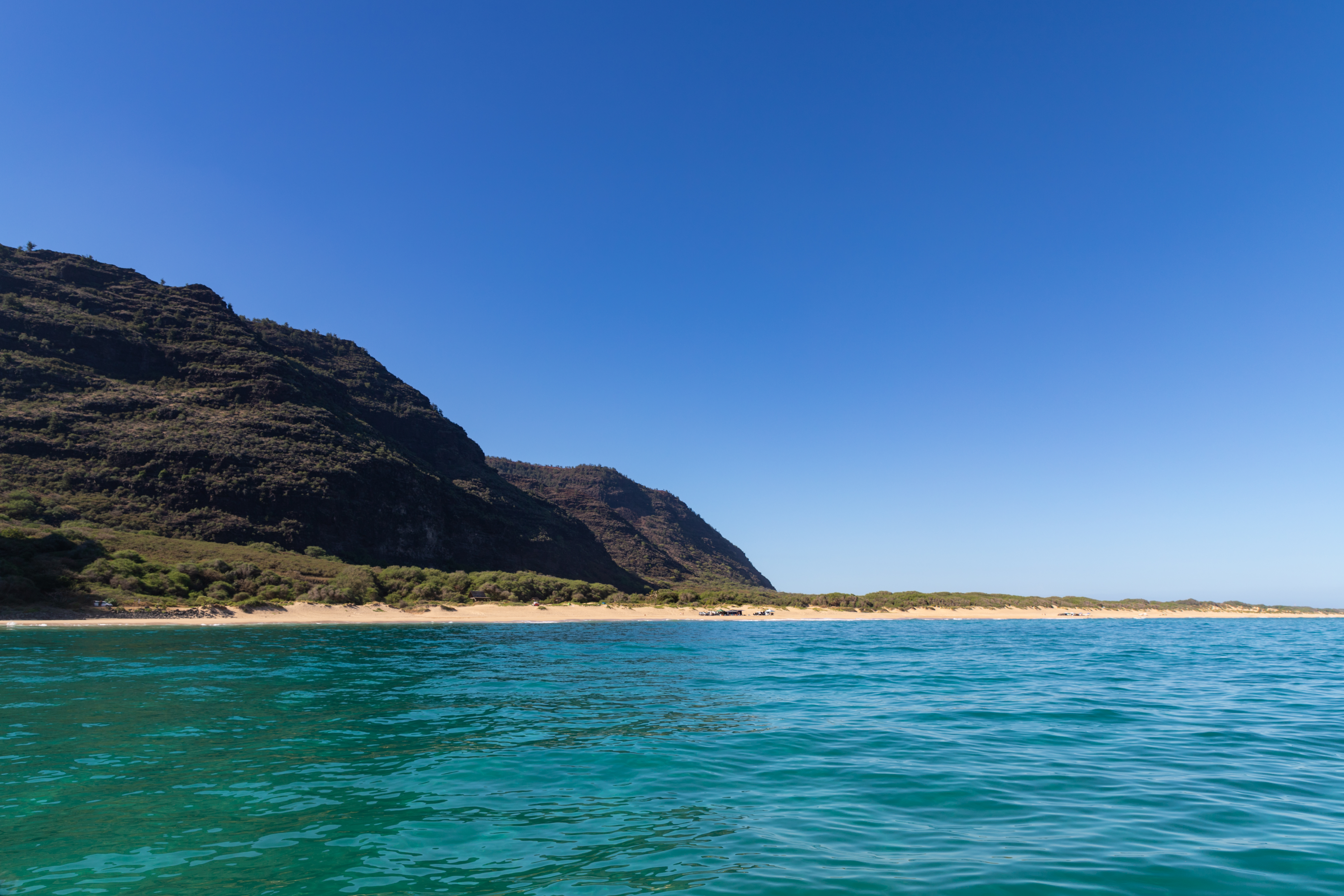
Polihale Beach, Kauai, Hawaii

== See also ==
- List of Hawaiian state parks
