= Hāʻena, Hawaii =

Hāʻena may refer to the following places in the U.S. state of Hawaii:

- Hāʻena, Hawaiʻi County, Hawaii, an unincorporated community
- Hāʻena, Kauaʻi County, Hawaii, an unincorporated community and census-designated place
- Haʻena State Park
