= Na Pali =

Na Pali can refer to:

- Nā Pali Coast State Park (a portion of the Nā Pali coast) in Kaua'i
- Return to Na Pali expansion pack for the computer game Unreal
