= Hanakoa Valley =

Valley in Hawaii, United States

Coordinates: 22.198333°N 159.626944°W

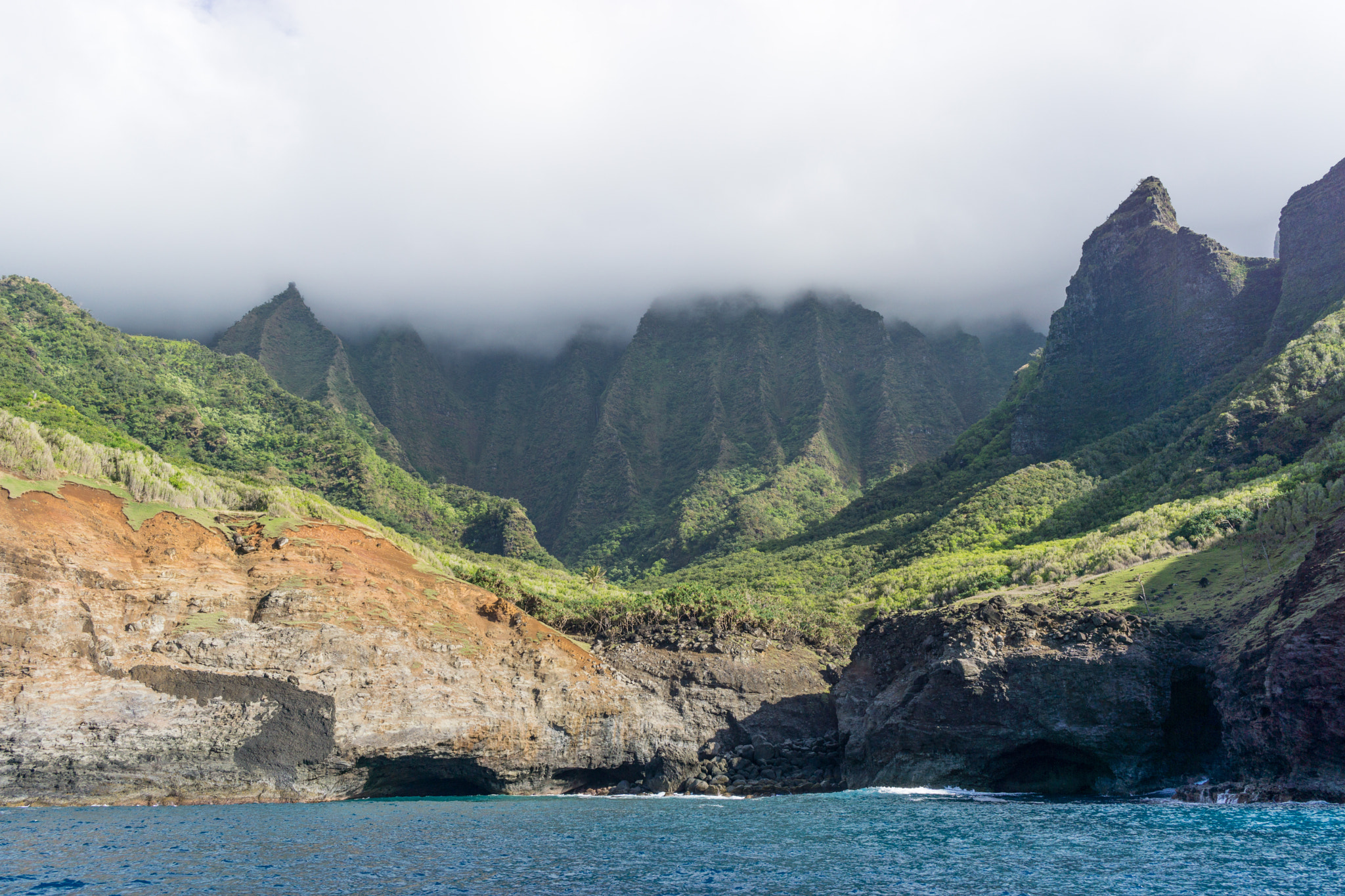
Hanakoa Valley viewed from sea

Hanakoa Valley is a hanging valley along the Kalalau Trail along the Nā Pali Coast of the island of Kauai in the state of Hawaii. Hanakoa has primitive camping via permit only and offers individual campsites, shelters, and basic composting toilets. It is located on mile 6 of the Kalalau Trail, often used as a resting destination for hikers completing the Kalalau Trail to Kalalau Valley. Hanakoa Stream runs through camp and divides it in half. Nearby Hanakoa Falls is accessible by an unmaintained trail.
