= Schiedea waiahuluensis =

Scientific classification
- Kingdom: Plantae
- Clade: Tracheophytes
- Clade: Angiosperms
- Clade: Eudicots
- Order: Caryophyllales
- Family: Caryophyllaceae
- Genus: Schiedea
- Species: S. waiahuluensis

Binomial name
- Schiedea waiahuluensis W.L.Wagner, Weller, B.Nyberg & A.K.Sakai

Species of flowering plant

Schiedea waiahuluensis is a species of Schiedea that was discovered using a drone-based collection system operated by the National Tropical Botanical Garden.

The University of California, Irvine greenhouse that showed that it had enlarged, somewhat whitish sepals similar to those of the cliff-dwelling Schiedea attenuata.

Schiedea waiahuluensis is a member of the family Caryophyllaceae and one of 36 Schiedea species native to Hawai‛i, twelve of which are found only on Kauaʻi.

It is the first plant species to be discovered using a drone-based collection system.
