= Kalalau Beach =

Beach on the Nā Pali Coast in north-west Kauaʻi in Hawaiʻi, U.S.

Coordinates: 22°10′39″N 159°39′31″W

Kalalau Beach is a beach on the Nā Pali Coast at the base of the Kalalau Valley in north-west Kauaʻi in Hawaiʻi. It is the final destination of the Kalalau Trail, one of the most difficult trails on the Hawaiian Islands. The beach is approximately 1 mile long, with trails snaking through the rest of the valley where people in hiding are rumored to live. There is a camp site on the beach, with a waterfall providing fresh water and composting toilets available. Camping requires a permit.

The beach has high surf, due to the lack of off shore reefs to break the waves. There are strong rip currents making swimming near impossible. In years past, companies offered a landing service, boating hikers in and out of the beach so that they could hike the trail easily. It is still possible to kayak into and out of the beach.

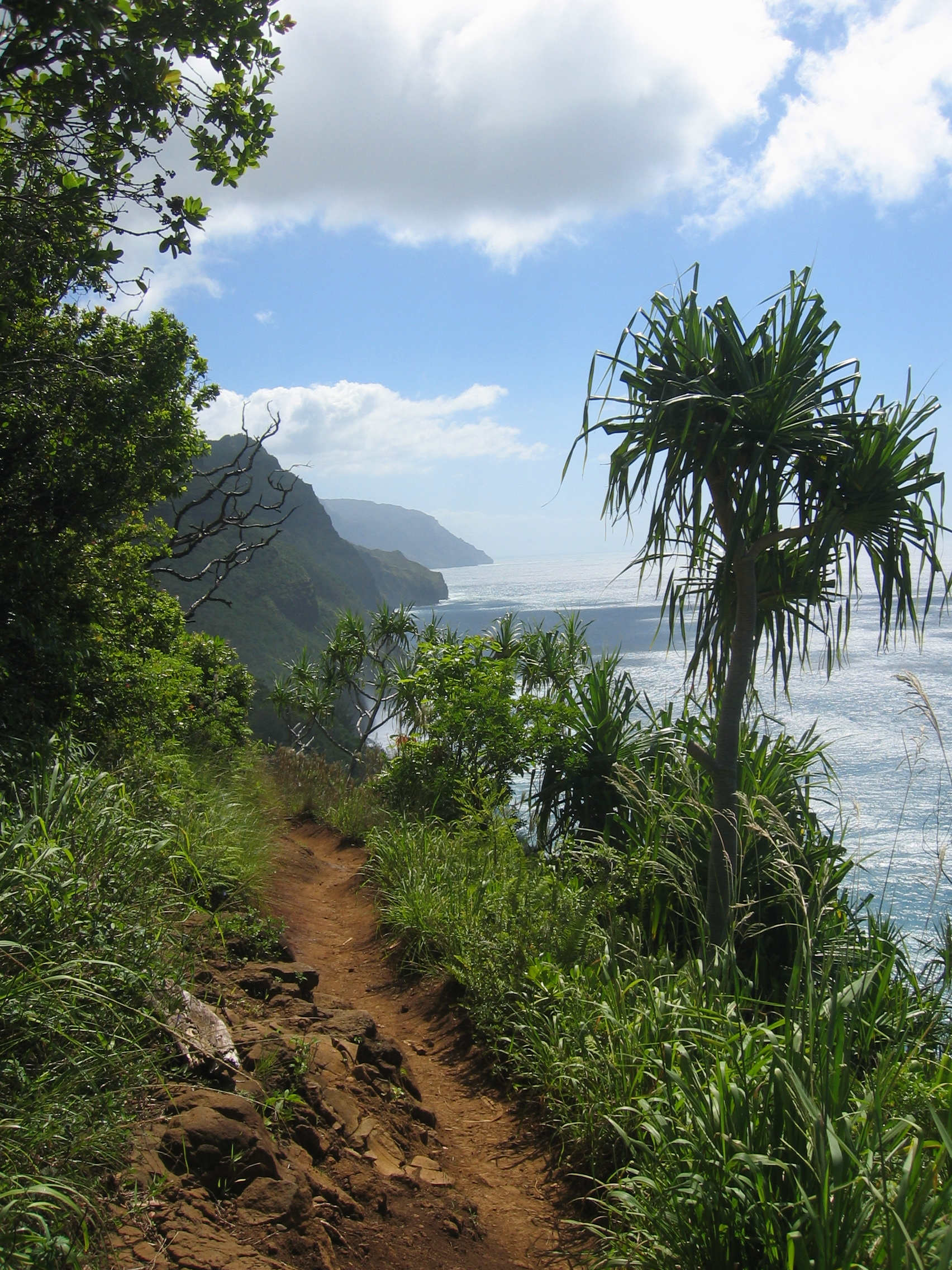
Kalalau Trail leading to the beach

The trail ends at Kalalau Beach, as the ocean comes up the cliffs at the western end. The stretch of the Nā Pali Coast westward from Kalalau Beach to Polihale Beach is inaccessible overland and beaches along that part of the coast can only be reached by sea or by helicopter. Kayaking and swimming (by strong swimmers with fins) from Kalalau Beach are the only ways to reach Honopū Beach.

Long term tourists who stay beyond the authorized five days that a camping permit allows are generally considered squatters. These year-round residents may hike out every few months to get food and supplies. Their presence creates an interesting local culture. Many squatters are students on summer vacation, but others have lived in the valley for decades. Park rangers occasionally clear these inhabitants out or chase them into hiding.

Water from the waterfall should be purified by boiling or iodine pills, due to the threat of leptospirosis, a bacterial disease spread through contact with infected rat and goat urine. There are herds of feral goats roaming the beach and valley. The goats are a non-native species, and to prevent overpopulation the Department of Land and Natural Resources allows hunting on weekends in August and September. Visitors can find field-dressed pelts hanging around, as hunters pack out only the meat.

Mango, guava, passion fruit, and cherry tomatoes are abundant in the valley and are cultivated by the locals.

On March 27, 2026, a helicopter crash occurred at the beach, killing three people.

== See also ==
- List of beaches in Kauai
