= Nā Pali Coast State Park =

State park in Hawaii, United States

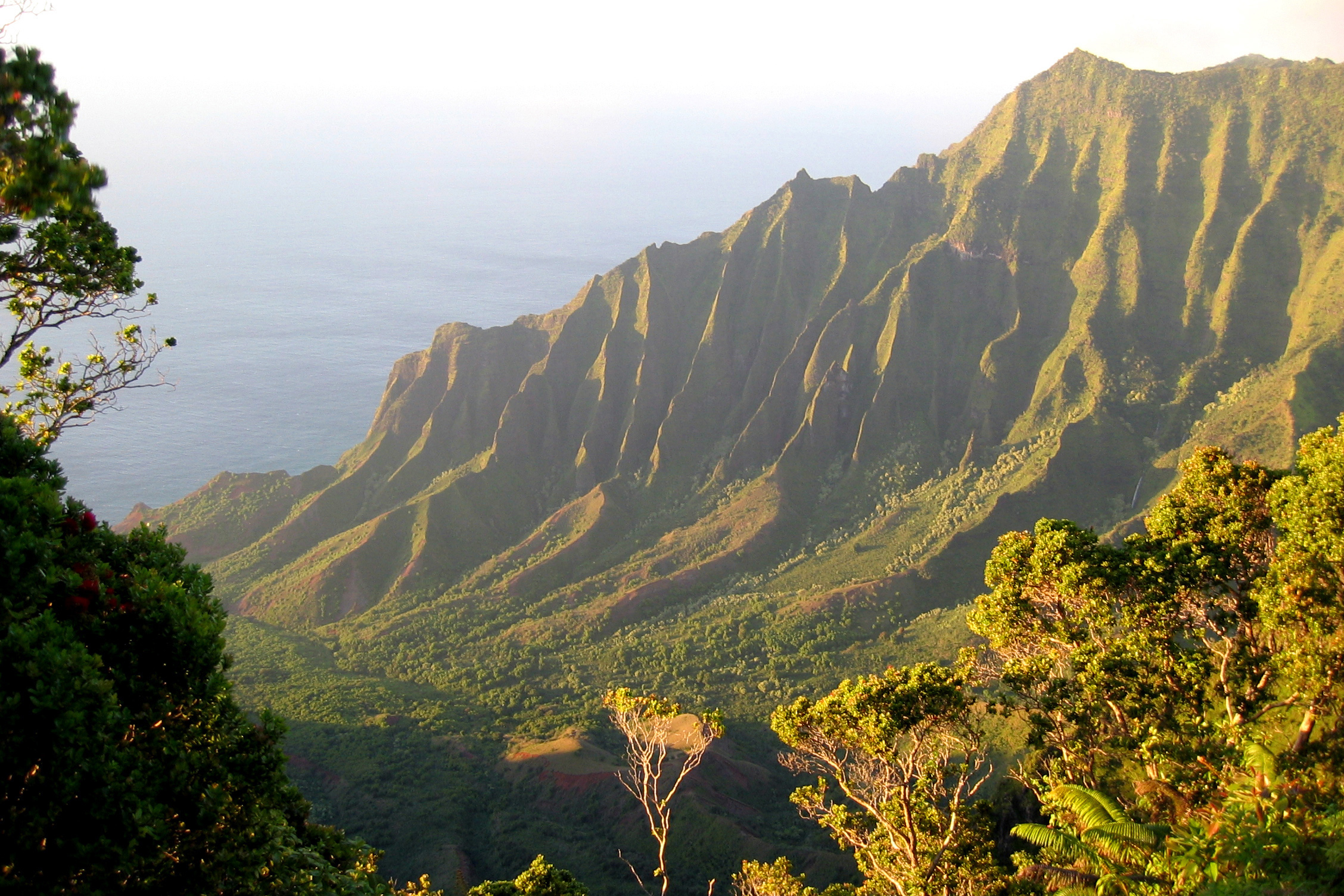
- Nā Pali overlook of the Kalalau Valley

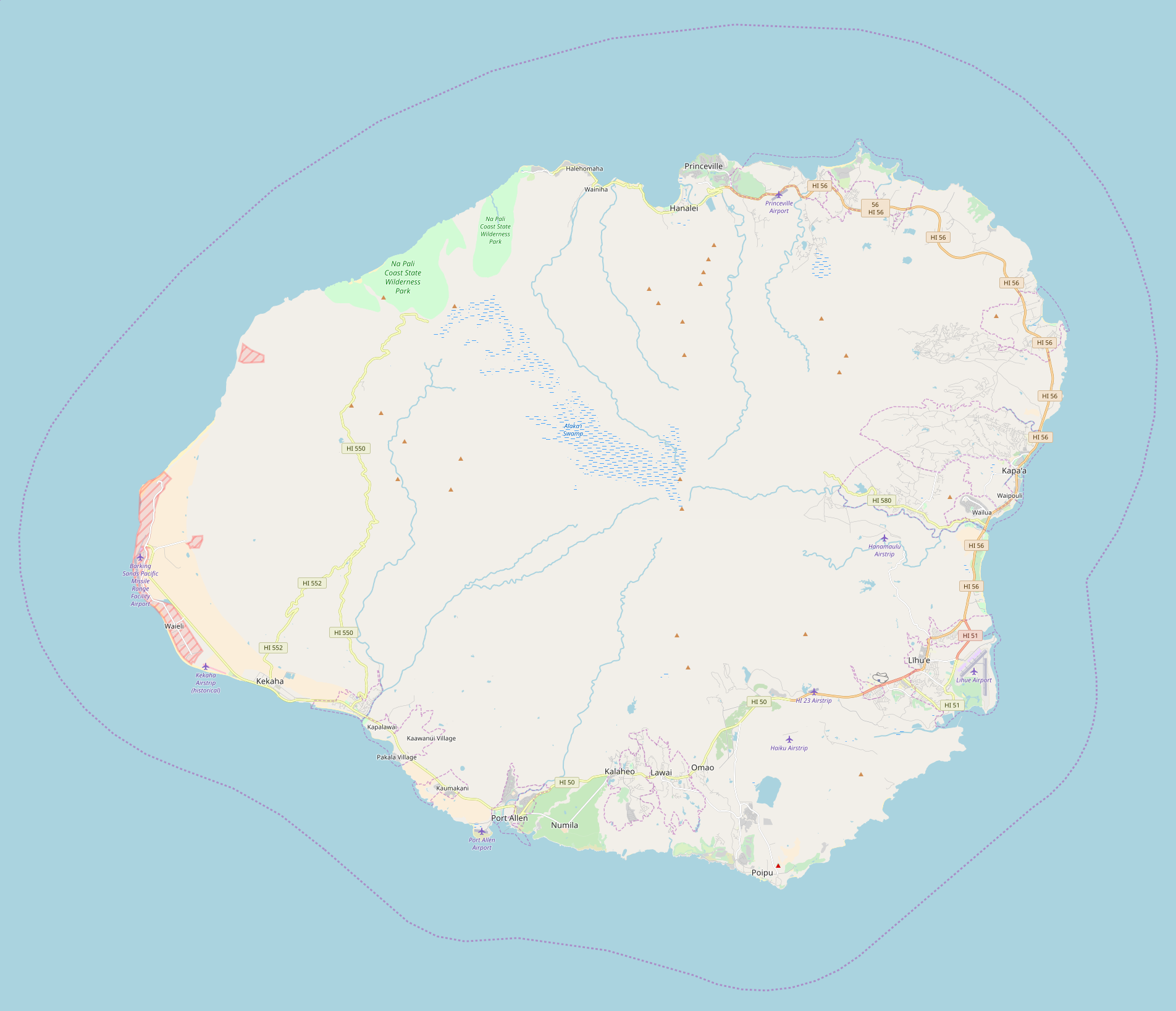
- Location within Kauai Location within Hawaii
- Location: Kauaʻi, United States
- Coordinates: 22°10′32″N 159°38′37″W
- Area: 6,175 acres (24.99 km^{2})
- Governing body: Hawaii Department of Land and Natural Resources

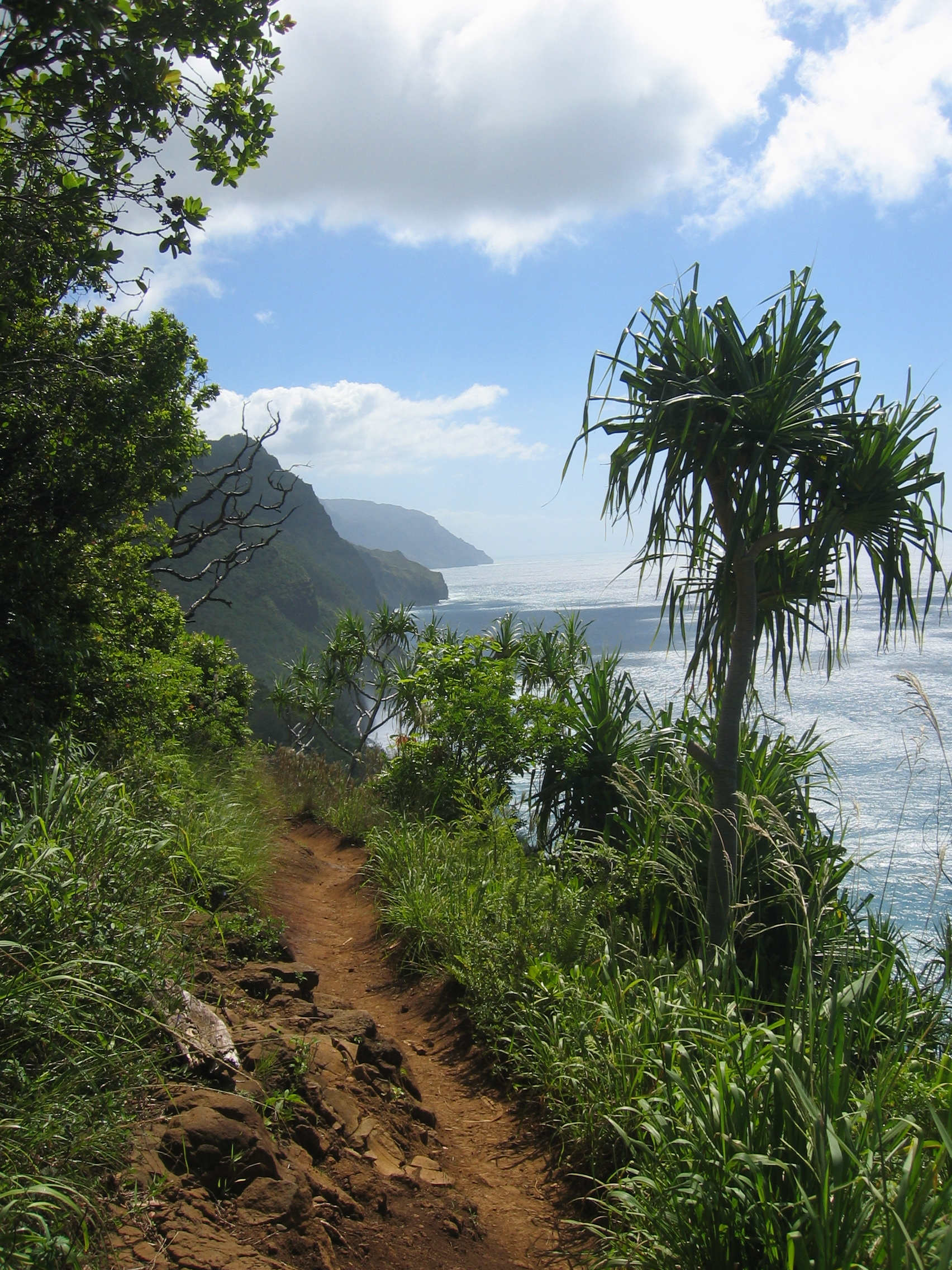
Along the Kalalau Trail

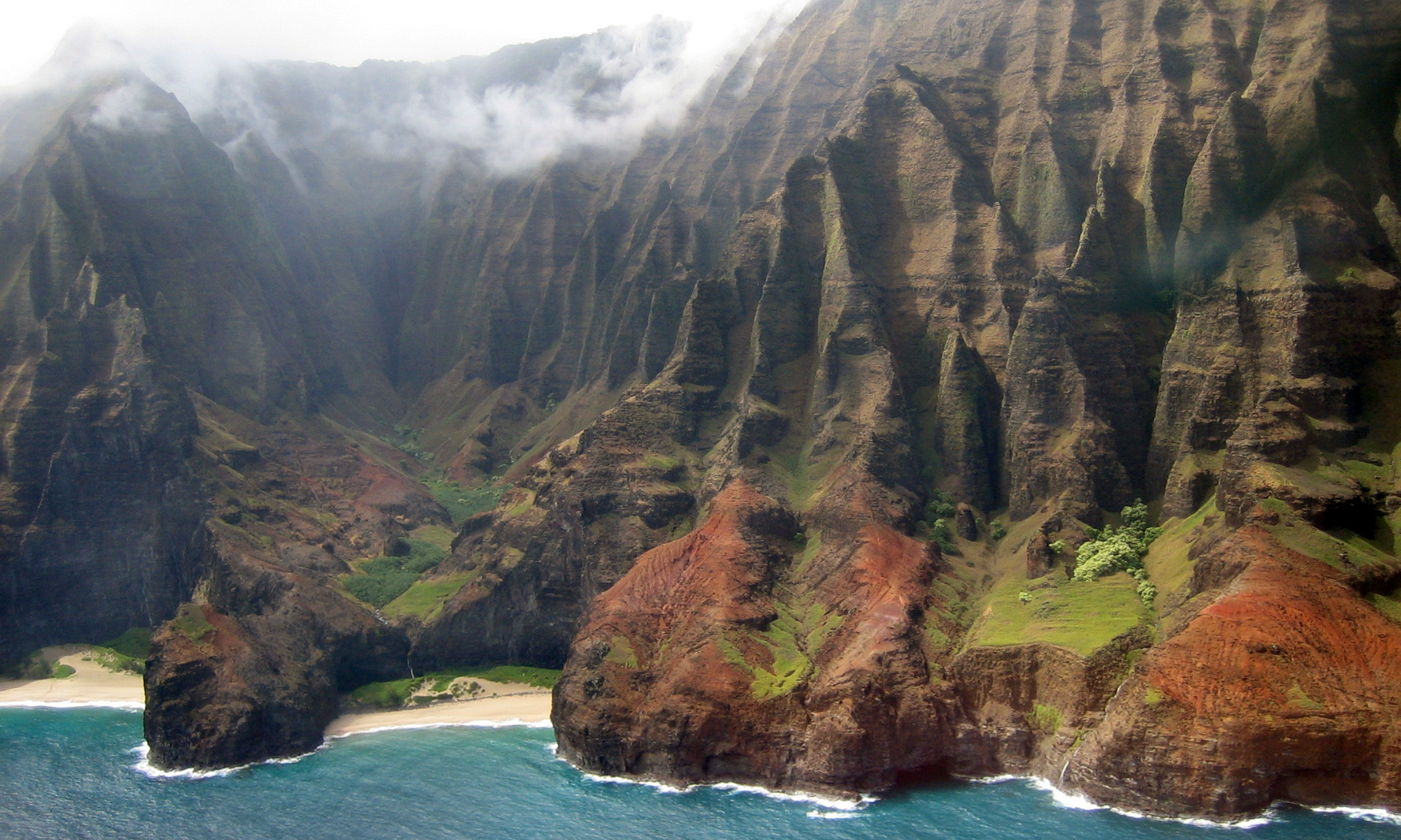
Honopū Valley, aerial view

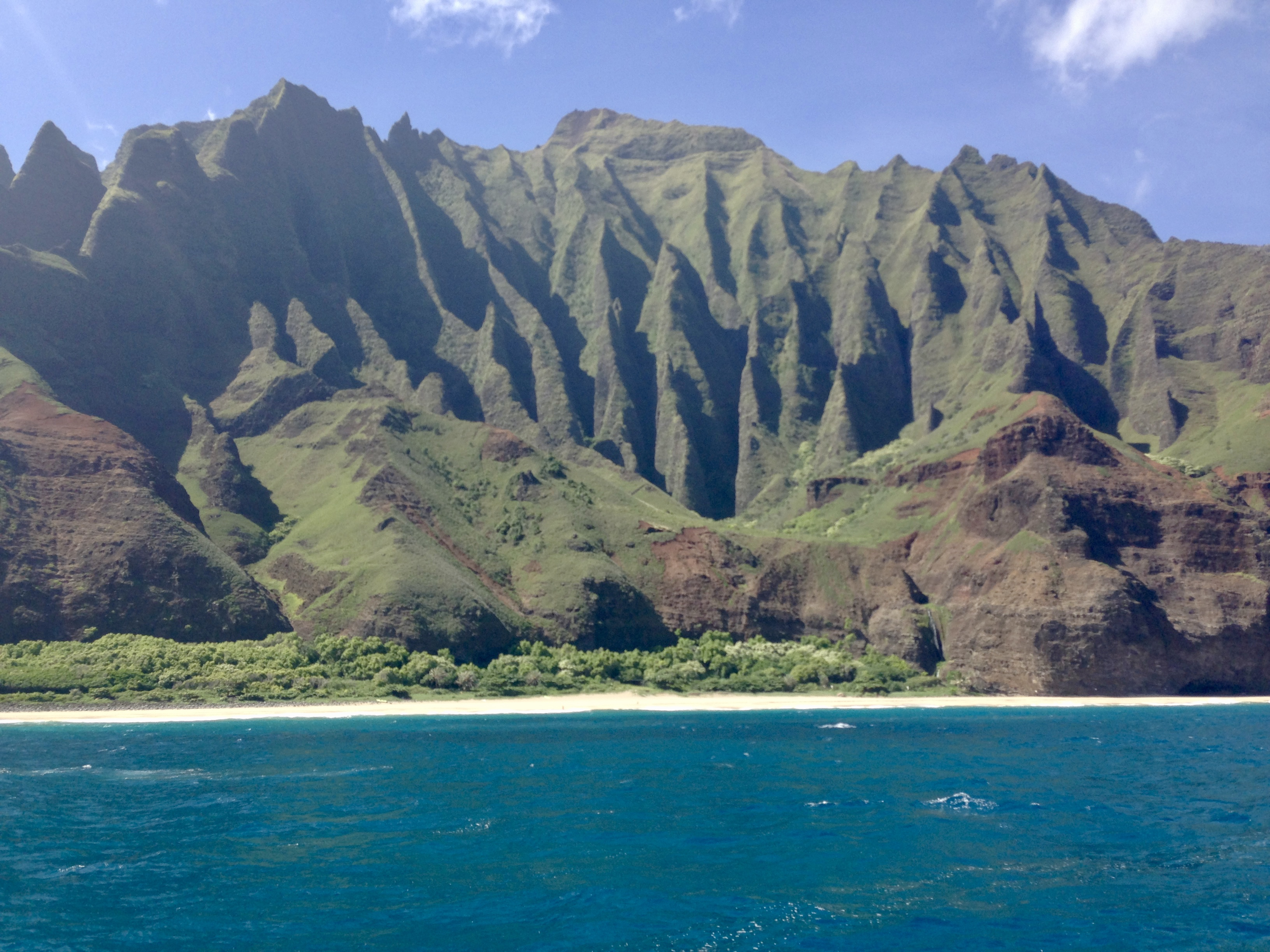
Nā Pali Coast view from a boat

Nā Pali Coast State Park is a 6,175-acre (2,499 ha) state park in the U.S. state of Hawaii, located in the center of the rugged 16-mile (26 km) northwest side of Kauaʻi, the second-oldest inhabited Hawaiian island. The Nā Pali coast itself extends southwest from Keʻe Beach all the way to Polihale State Park. The nā pali (many cliffs) along the shoreline rise as much as 4,000 feet (1,200 m) above the Pacific Ocean. The state park was formed to protect the Kalalau Valley.

To the east of the state park is the Hono O Nā Pali State Natural Reserve. It was established in 1983 and later extended to over 3,578 acres (1,448 hectares) in 2009. Hiking trails and hunters' roads provide access to the sharp ridges from Koke'e Road (route 550) in Waimea Canyon.

== Accessibility ==
Although inaccessible to vehicles, this coast can be enjoyed over land by hiking or in a helicopter, and from the ocean by kayak and paddleboard. Charter tours are available on rigid-hulled inflatable boat or catamaran, originating from Port Allen and Hanalei Bay. The Kalalau Trail from the end of Hawaii Route 560 (called the Kuhio Highway) provides the only land access along the coast, traversing 11 miles (18 km) and crossing five major valleys (and many smaller ones) before reaching Kalalau Beach at the base of Kalalau Valley. Side trails along the way lead to waterfalls in the valleys above. The coast in between Kalalau Beach and Polihale Beach is inaccessible by hiking and can only be reached by boat or helicopter. Kayak trips are a popular way to visit this area.

== History ==
The Nā Pali Coast was formed five million years ago, when a massive amount of water spilled onto the northwest side of the island, carving its valleys.

The first settlers on the Nā Pali Coast were Polynesian navigators around 1200 AD. Soon after, many Tahitian migrants followed, shaping the culture of Kauaʻi and other Hawaiian islands today. The coast was a center for trade between Hanalei, Waimea and Niʻihau, and branched out to nearby island colonies. After Kauaʻi was visited by Captain Cook in 1778, many Westerners began traveling to the island. As more foreigners arrived, the Hawaiian tribes along the Nā Pali Coast, where Nā Pali Coast State Park now exists, began to die off from Western diseases. The last known native Hawaiians to live along the Nā Pali Coast were sighted in the 20th century.

== Camping ==
Camping in Nā Pali Coast State Park is only allowed with a valid permit. There are three sites that allow camping access. During the summer season from May 15 to September 7, access from the ocean via boat or kayak is only allowed with a valid camping permit. Along the Kalalau Trail, the two authorized spots for camping are in Kalalau and Hanakoa. Both are covered by the same permit and can be accessed by hiking. These locations include facilities to accommodate campers. Five nights is the maximum stay on the Kalalau Trail, and one night maximum for Hanakoa. The camp site at Miloli'i is only accessible by boat or kayak. Permits allow access for maximum of three days. Composting toilets are available at all three camp sites.

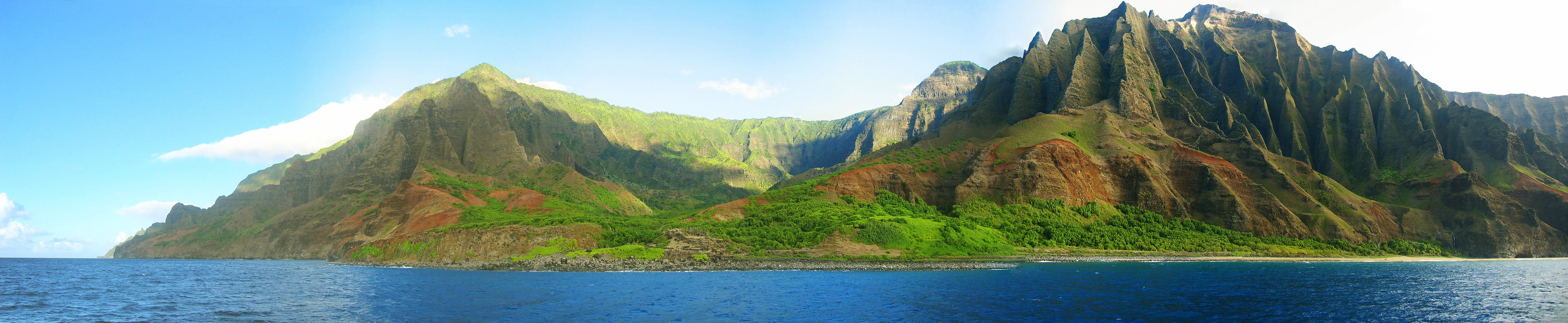
A view of the Nā Pali Coast from the ocean

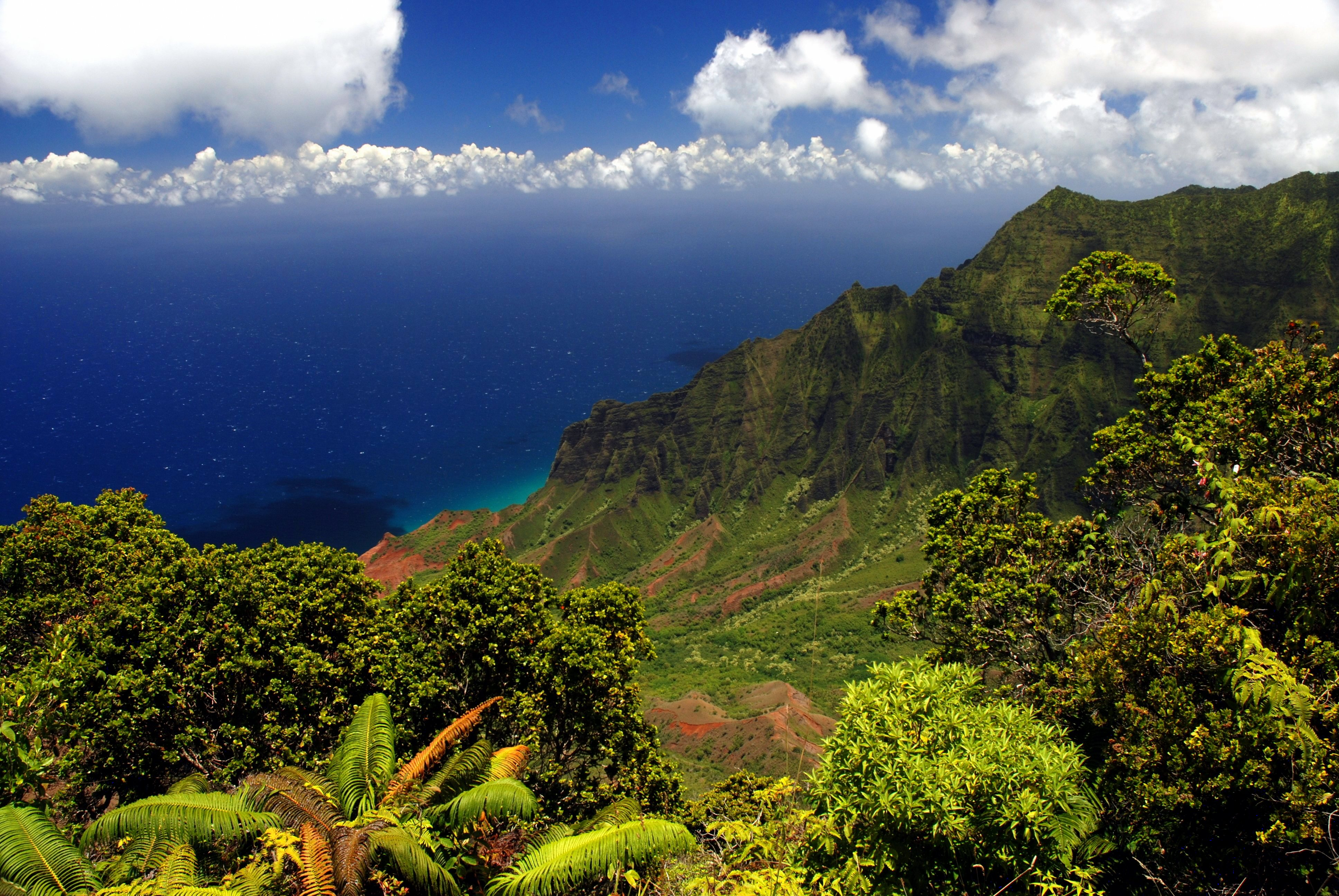
Nā Pali Coast view

== See also ==
- Natural Area Reserves System Hawaii
- Hanakapiai Beach
- Hanakapiai Falls
- Hanakoa Valley
