= Kalalau Valley =

Valley in Hawaii, United States

Coordinates: 22°10′48″N 159°39′13″W

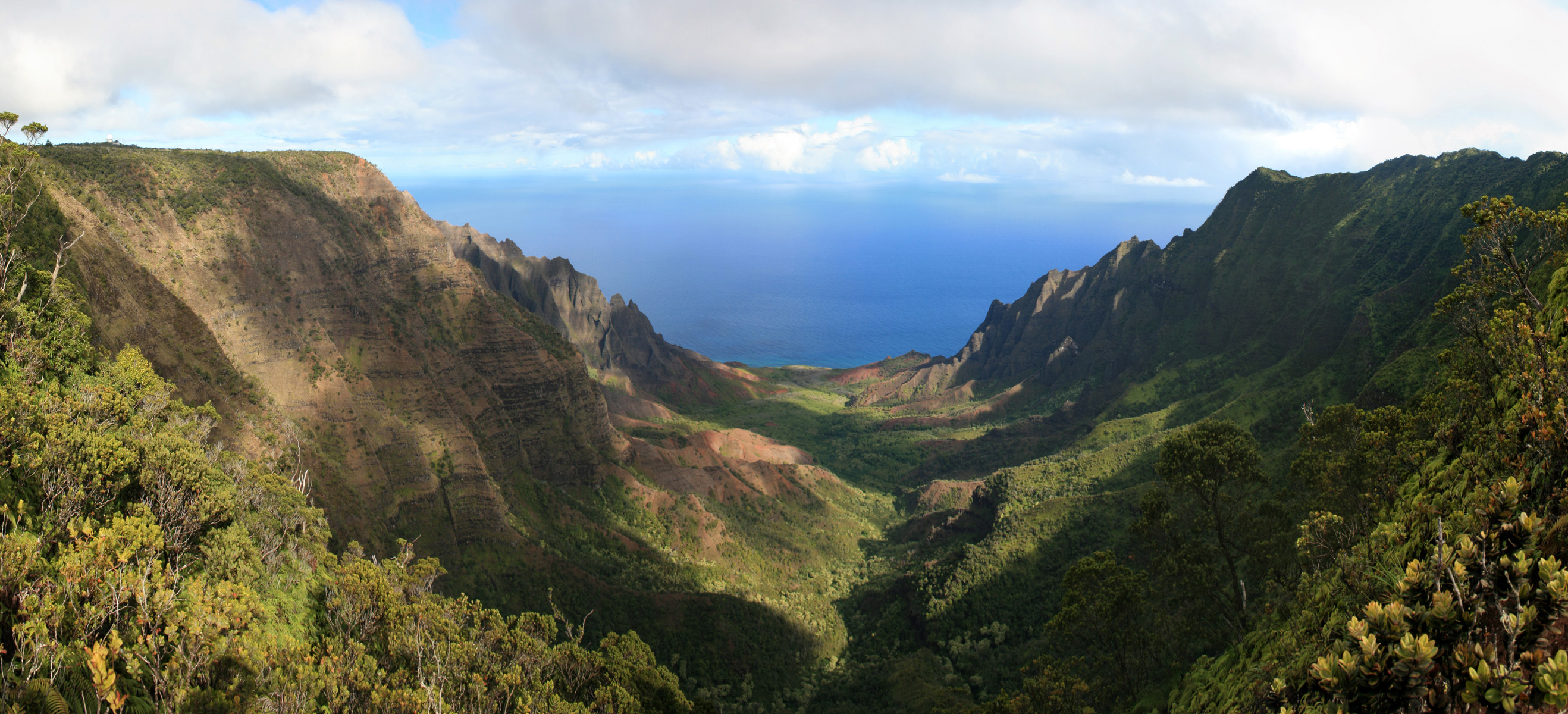
Kalalau Valley viewed from the Nā Pali Kona Forest Reserve Pihea Trail

The Kalalau Valley is on the northwest side of the island of Kauai in the state of Hawaii. The valley is in Nā Pali Coast State Park and houses the Kalalau Beach. The Nā Pali Coast is rugged and is inaccessible to automobiles. The only legal ways to access the valley are by kayak or by hiking the Kalalau Trail.

The valley is surrounded by cliffs more than 2,000 feet (610 m) high. This valley's bottom is broad and relatively flat, with an accessible region about 2 miles (3.2 km) long and 0.5 miles (0.80 km) wide. The abundant sun and rain provides an ideal environment for flora and fauna. Many Native Hawaiians lived in the valley into the 20th century, farming taro from a vast complex of terraced fields. Today, its designation as a state park forbids anyone from residing there.

== Access to Kalalau Valley ==
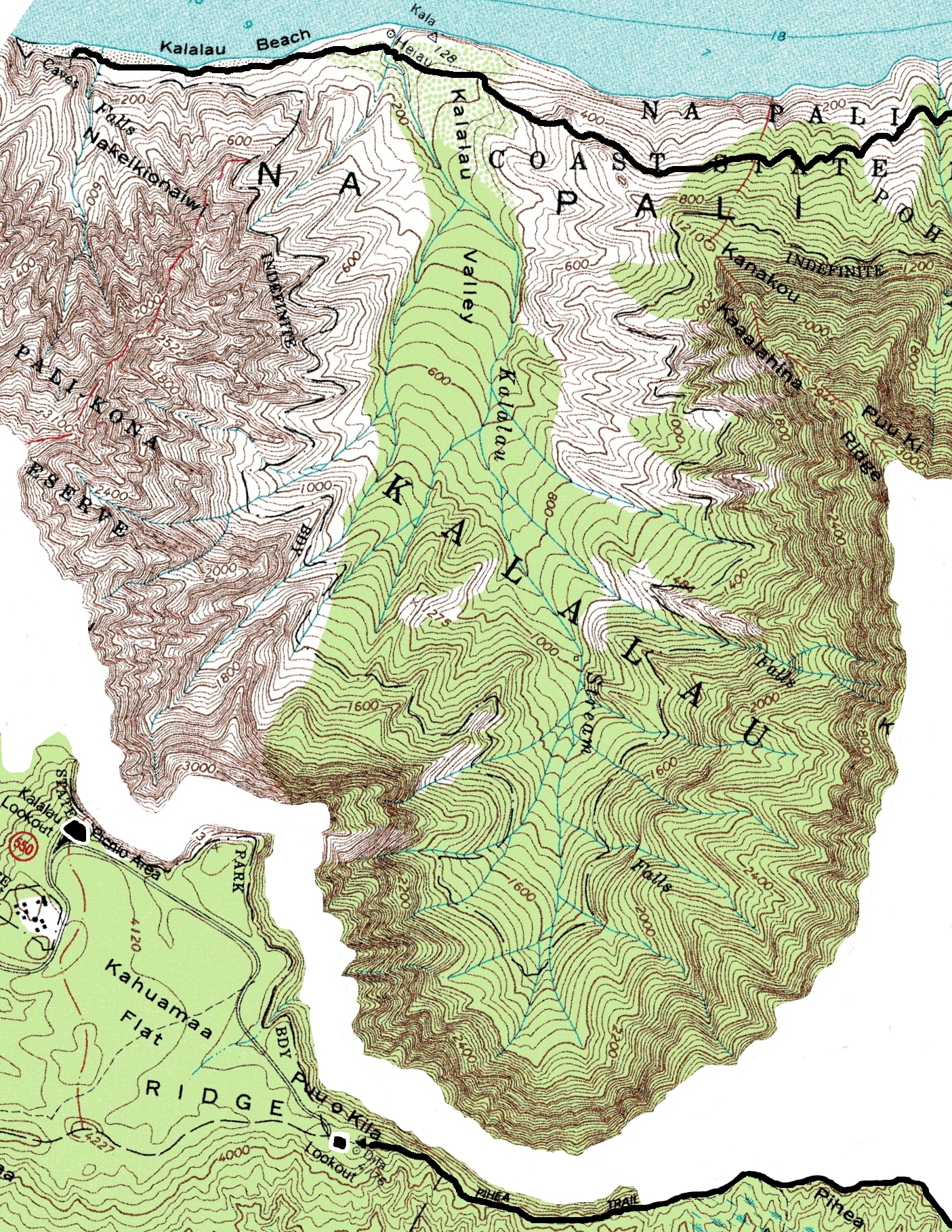
Edited version of USGS topographical chart of Kalalau Valley below 2,000 feet elevation. The Kalalau Trail is shown as a black line near the top of the image. The Pihea Trail is shown as a black line near the bottom of the image.

Since the Nā Pali Coast is too steep for any motorized vehicles, all access to the valley is by boat or foot, except for emergency helicopter landings. Kayaks are a popular way to visit the valley, although sea conditions can make this dangerous during the winter. Hiking and trail running the Kalalau Trail are also popular, but the trail is about 11 miles (18 km) long, quite strenuous for those not in good shape, and can be dangerous at parts for inexperienced people.

Access to the Kalalau Valley is controlled. A limited number of permits are sold for camping in Kalalau Valley every year by the Hawaii Department of Land and Natural Resources (DLNR), although parking for campers is no longer allowed at the trail head. Instead, parking is now an exclusive privilege for day users of Ha'ena State Park, where the Kalalau Trail head is, and permitted Kalalau campers are provided no overnight parking whatsoever. Anyone wishing to hike or run beyond Hanakāpīʻai valley must have a permit to stay in Kalalau Valley overnight, even if their intention is to return the same day. Sixty overnight permits are issued for each night. Permits must generally be sought as early as six months in advance of travel.

== Ecology ==
The valley is home to many rare species, including the endangered plant Dubautia kalalauensis, which was named for the valley and is found nowhere else in the world. Other endemics include the endangered Schiedea attenuata., and previously unknown plant species have been discovered there .

== Life in Kalalau Valley ==
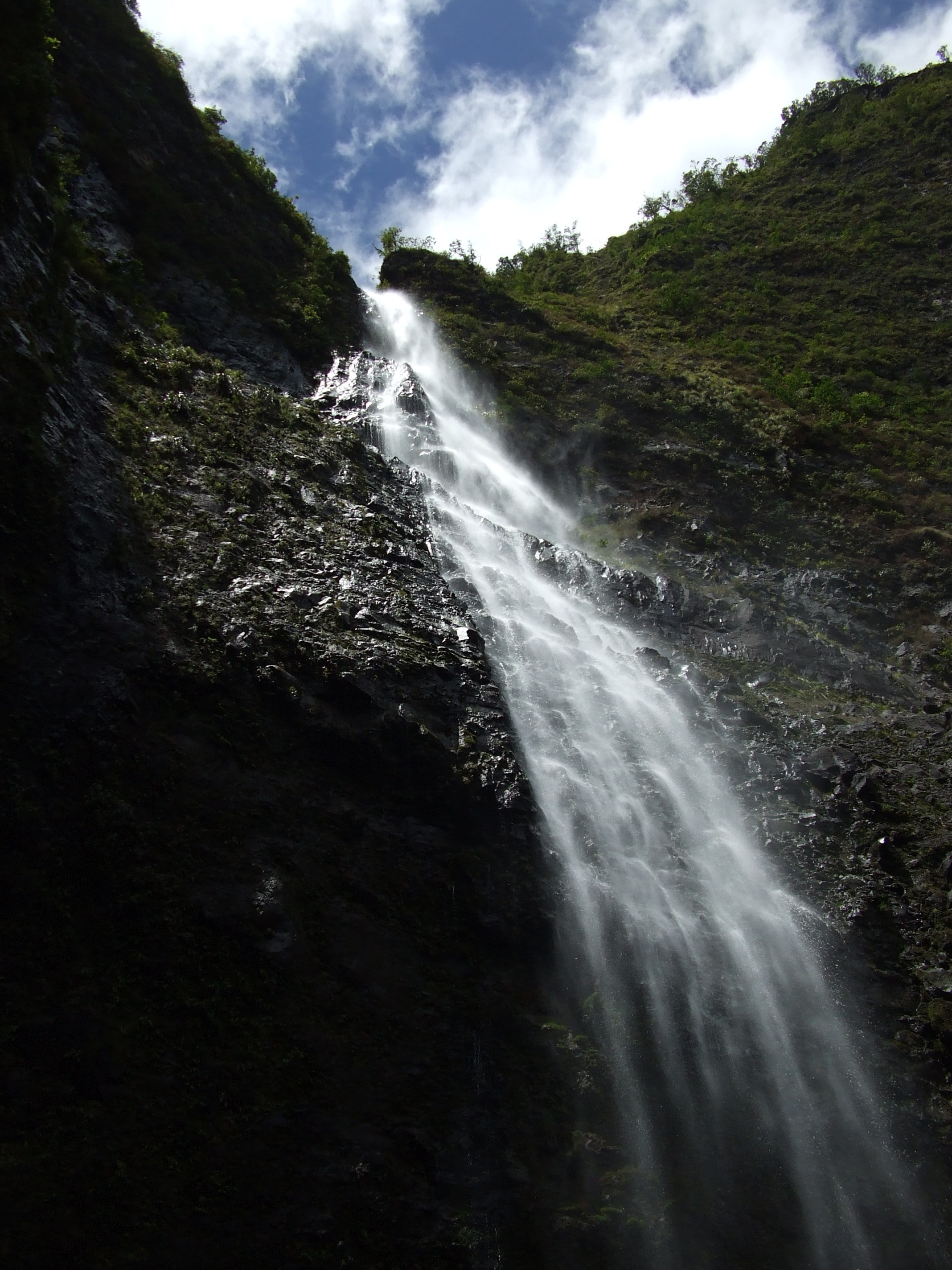
The falls at the end of Hanakapi`ai Valley, on the Nā Pali Coast.

The natural environment and relative isolation, despite the noise of constant helicopter traffic, are the valley's major attractions. Legal campers stay outside the valley in the designated camping area within roughly 300 feet (91 m) of Kalalau beach. A small waterfall in this area is used for bathing and washing dishes.

At one end of the beach is a stream that is also used for fresh water. All the streams are susceptible to contamination with leptospirosis, a bacterium transmitted from infected rodents' urine.

=== Squatters ===
Despite the efforts of the state of Hawaii, some people illegally hike the Kalalau Trail and camp and even live in the valley. Visitors without a permit are occasionally issued citations that require a court appearance and a fine of up to $500 for a first offense.

On April 28, 2017, Cody Safadago, a man alleged to be living in Kalalau, was charged with stealing a truck and causing an accident that killed a Kauai woman the previous day, while he was driving drunk. This incident seems to have increased awareness of illegal activity in Kalalau Valley, and may have helped lead to a May 2017 crackdown on illegal campers in Kalalau by officers of the Department of Land and Natural Resources (DLNR). Some Hawaii residents have complained about illegal campers in Kalalau, referencing videos posted online by some of those campers. Some videos appear to have been removed, but the anger among locals continues. Some feel contempt for what they call "hippies" and "squatters" who violate state law by camping without required permits—sometimes for months or longer—in Kalalau Valley. Some Kauai residents decry the camping by people they consider to be disrespectful of the land, citing reports of accumulating trash in the camps, and disrespect of the citizenry of Kauai through illegal conduct.

=== Destruction of terraced gardens ===
Kalalau Valley's terraced gardens are threatened by invasive trees that create underground root networks invading the rock walls. The trees then fall and topple the rock walls, causing permanent damage. The origin of the trees is disputed.

== Management of Kalalau Valley ==
The valley is a part of the Nā Pali Coast State Park and the DLNR is responsible for its maintenance and preservation.
