= Hanakāpīʻai Beach =

Beach in the Hawaiian islands known for its deadly currents

Coordinates: 22.2092°N 159.598°W

Hanakapiai Beach
- Beach
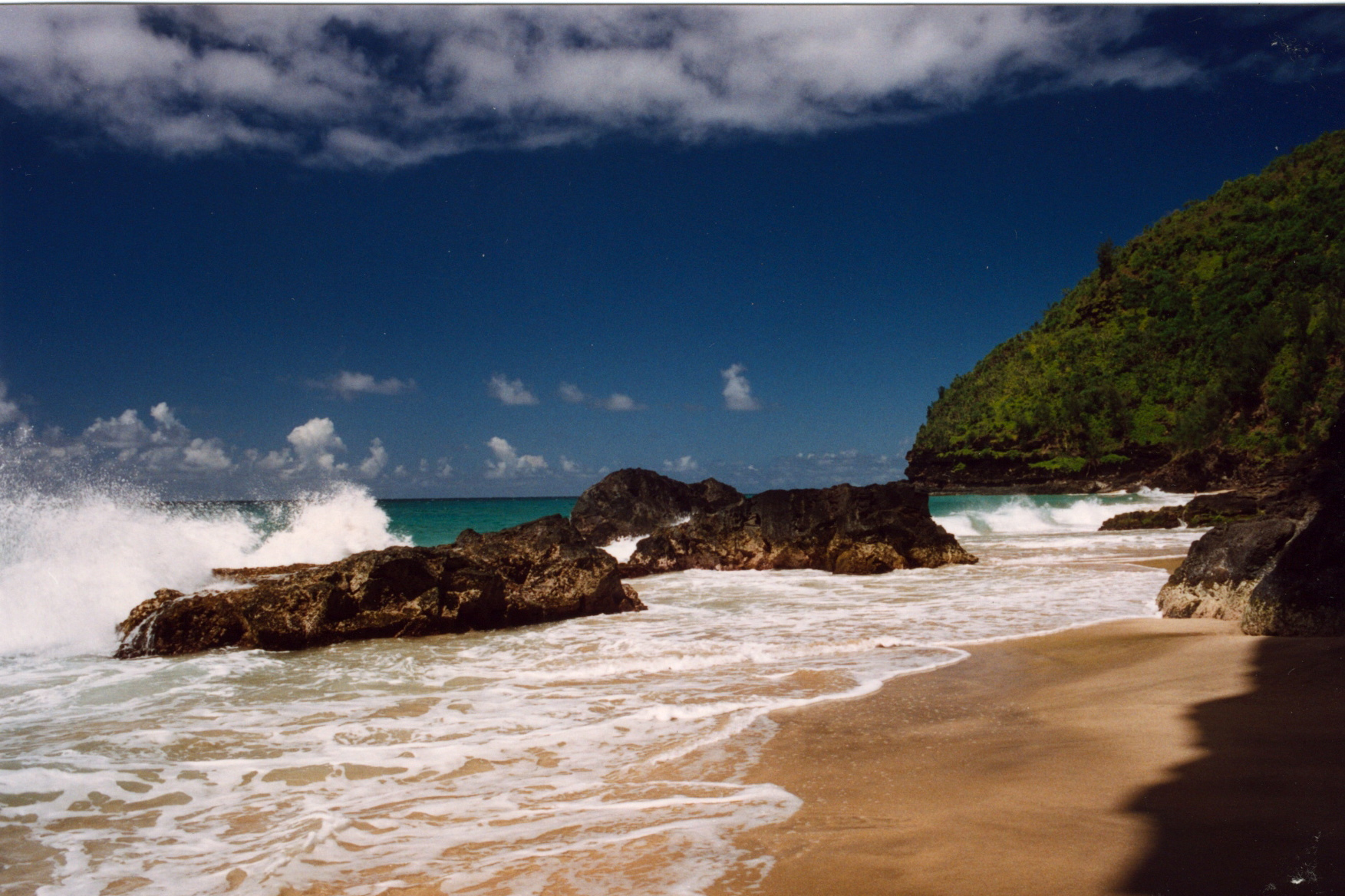
- Hanakāpīʻai Beach in 1995
- Interactive map of Hanakapiai Beach
- Location: Hawaiian islands
- Access: No road access

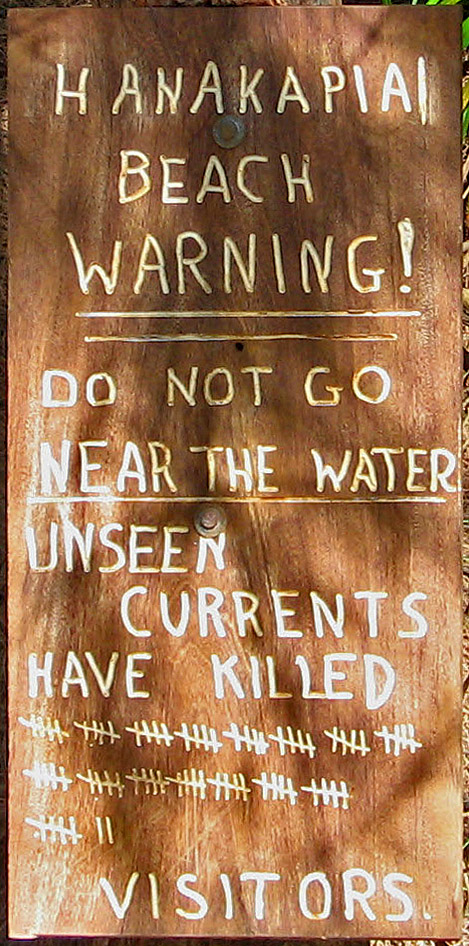
Tally marks sign warning hikers on the trail to Hanakapiai Beach. The number shown is 82.

Hanakāpīʻai Beach is a beach in the Hawaiian islands located on Kauai's Nā Pali Coast. The beach is approximately 2 miles (3.2 km) from the start of the Kalalau Trail, a very popular hiking trail which is located at Keʻe Beach. It is also about 2 miles (3.2 km) from Hanakapiai Falls. During summer months, Hanakāpīʻai Beach's sandy shore line is clearly visible; during winter months, dangerously powerful waves and high tides wash away the sandy shore line. The beach is remotely located with no road access. The word Hanakāpīʻai literally means "bay sprinkling food" in Hawaiian.

Hanakāpīʻai Beach is a popular tourist attraction; however, like many beaches on the Nā Pali Coast, strong rip currents, as well as high surf, dangerous shore breaks and other hazardous ocean conditions make Hanakāpīʻai Beach extremely dangerous. The Nā Pali Coast is especially treacherous because there are no major reefs to hinder potent ocean currents.

Kauai's geography makes Hanakāpīʻai conditions even more hazardous; in the event that one gets caught in a rip current (or otherwise swept out to sea) the nearest safe shore area is approximately six miles away. The currents in the region are so powerful that the bodies of at least 15 drowning victims have yet to be recovered. According to the local newspaper, from 1970 to 2010 about 30 people are known to have drowned here. Tourists often refer to a warning sign with 82 tally marks (as of August 2014) counting drowning victims. It has no official sponsor and this count is highly speculative.

== See also ==
- List of beaches in Hawaii
