= Honopū Valley =

Valley in Kauai County, Hawaii, United States

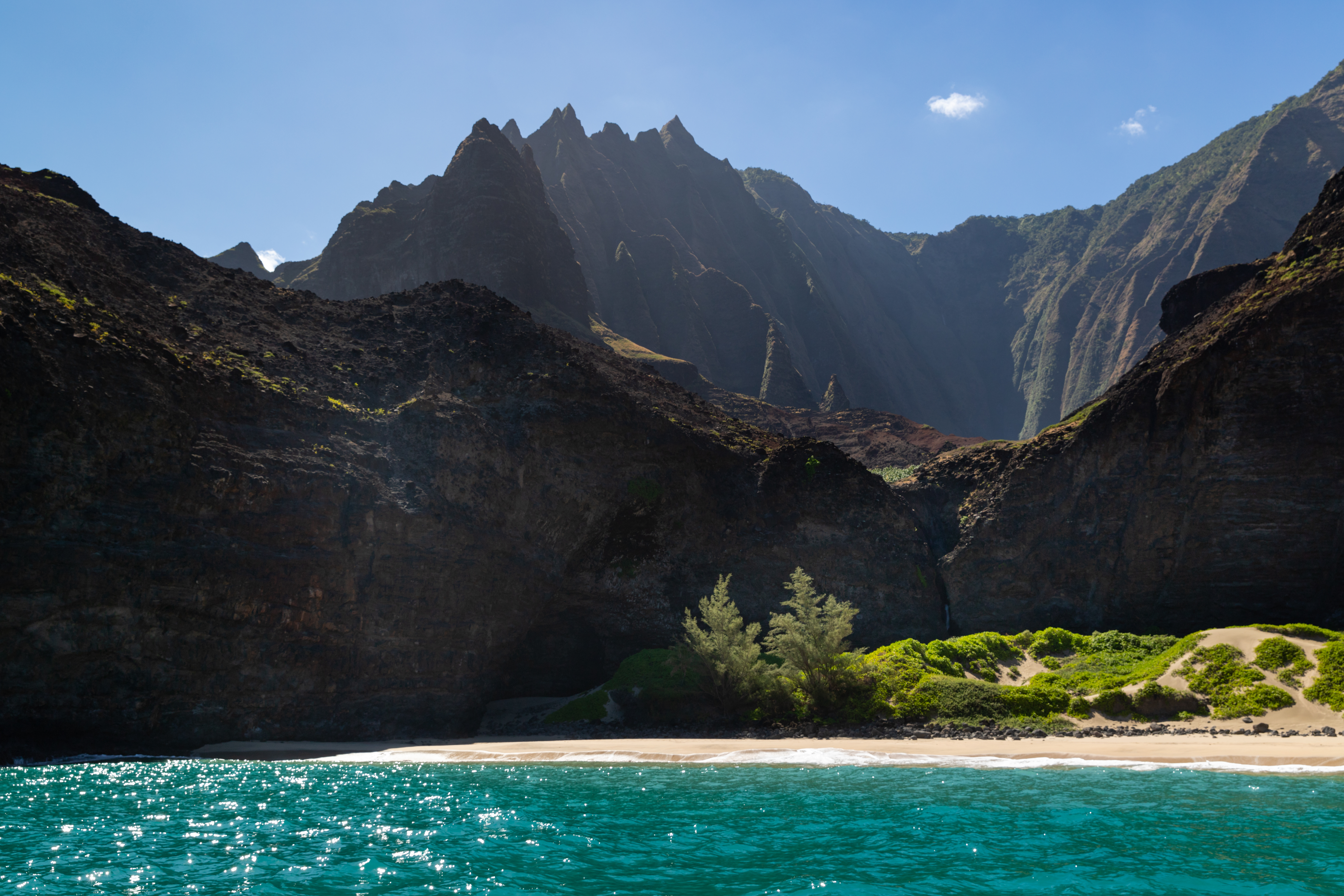
- View of the Honopū valley

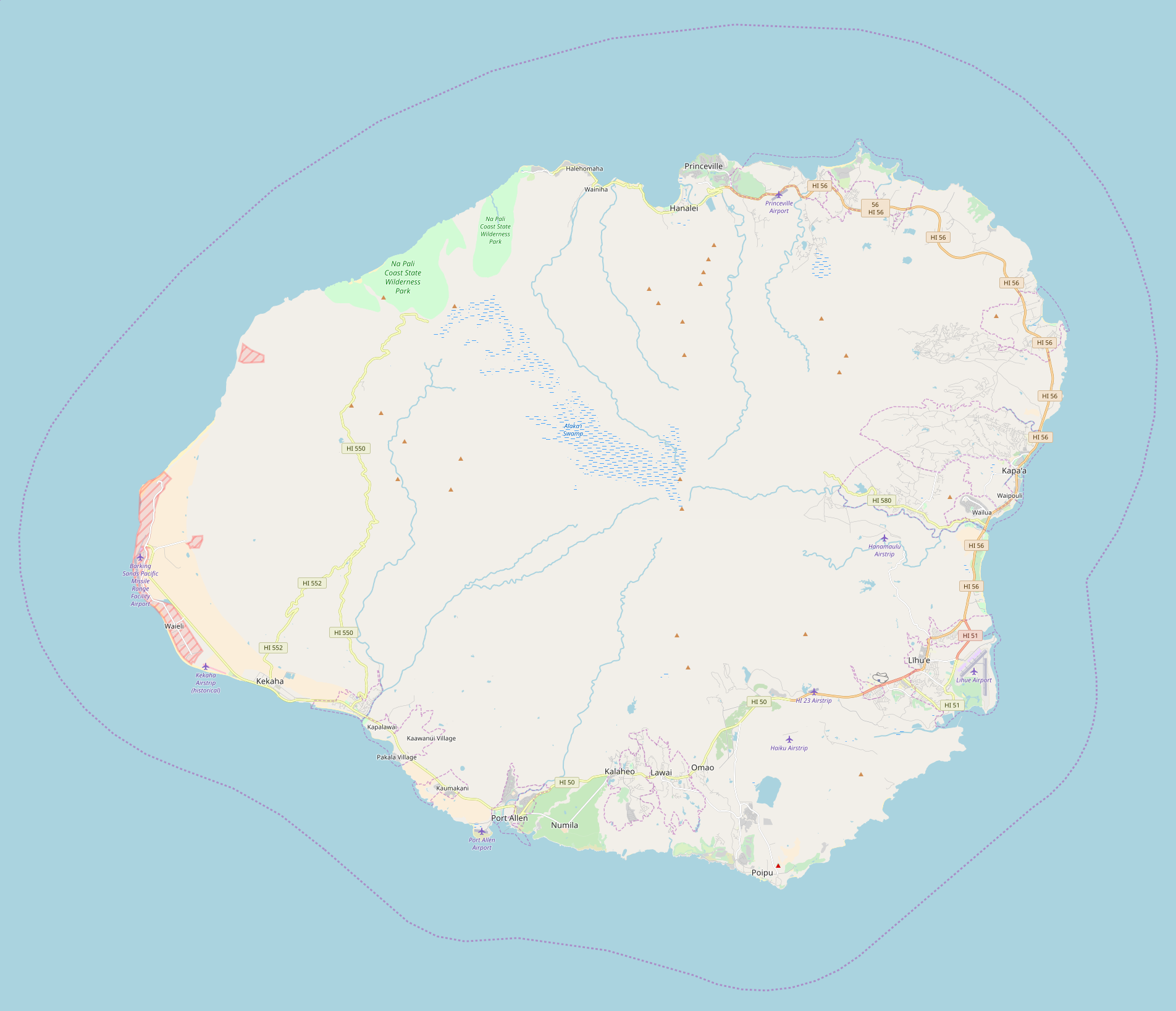
- Location within Kauai Location within Hawaii

Geography
- Location: Kauaʻi County
- Coordinates: 22°09′35″N 159°39′53″W
- Interactive map of Honopū Valley

Honopū Valley is a landmark valley within Nā Pali Coast State Park along the northwest shore of Kauaʻi, Hawaii, United States. It is known for its distinctive natural arch, which at approximately 90 feet (27 m) tall is the tallest in Hawaii. At the lower end of the valley is Honopū's secluded, 0.25-mile (0.40 km) beach, also known as Cathedral Beach.

Honopū means "conch shell", and the valley's name is derived from the conch shell-like sound its arch makes when hit by winds from the north.

== History ==
Honopū Valley and Beach sit along the northwest shore of the Hawaiian island of Kauaʻi, on the Nā Pali coast. The valley is isolated and not easily accessible except by water. No landing of any aircraft or boat is allowed in Honopū Valley or on its beach, so visitors must swim from an offshore boat or from neighboring Kalalau Beach.

The valley, because of the mystery surrounding the exodus of the people who lived there until the mid-19th century, is sometimes called the "valley of the lost tribe." In 1922, visiting archaeologists found several skulls thought to be primitive, pre-Hawaiian people. Later studies of the valley and its artifacts determined all of its residents were clearly Hawaiian, but the erroneous legend endures.

As the valley is hidden and isolated, it is believed to be spiritual: it is a place of temples and burial grounds, and the source of multiple Hawaiian legends and myths. The burial site for the local chiefs was located on the surrounding cliffs. It was believed that once a chief died, his bones held a supernatural power, and if found by others they could be used against the chief's tribe. When chiefs died, their bones were collected and taken to the cliffs, and the warrior who transported the bones had to die in order to ensure the secrecy of the location of the bones.

The land on Honopū Valley is highly fertile; wild fruit, such as guava and grapefruit, grow there.

On June 16, 1983, a US Navy Lockheed P-3 Orion BuNo 152720, tail coded YB-06, from VP-1 at NAS Barbers Point crashed during low clouds and fog into the ridge between the Honopu and Kalalau valleys, killing all 14 on board.

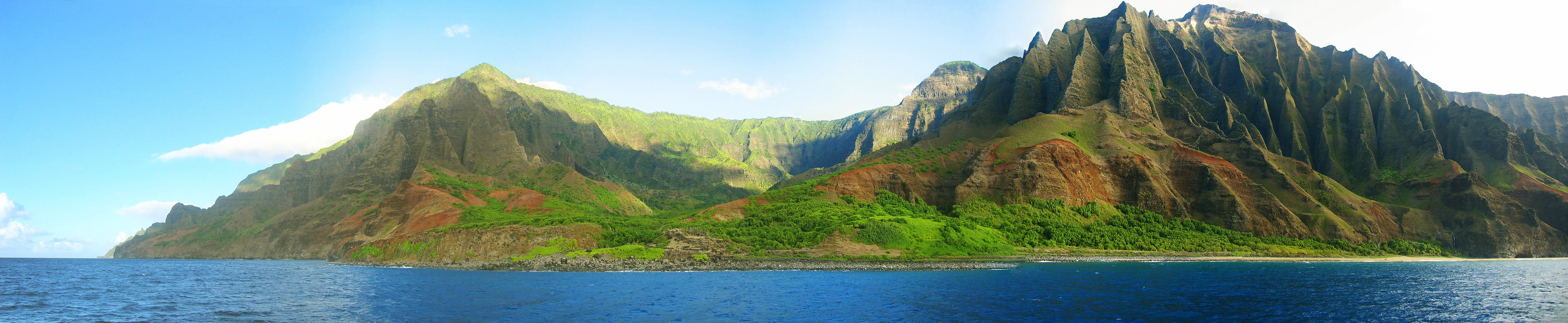
A view of the Nā Pali Coast from the ocean

== Menehune ==
Native Hawaiians refer to the ancient mythological Menehune people of Polynesia as being kamaʻaina, or "children of the land". While they may simply be mythical, the Menehune are said to have lived throughout the Hawaiian Islands, including Kauaʻi, which they inhabited in large numbers. The Honopu Valley is also known as "the valley of the lost tribe" because it was the home of the last Menehune.

== Travel ==
Honopū Ridge, above the cliffs, can be visited with a few miles' walk. The view along the way includes that of the ocean and the beach of Honopū. There are tour boats that travel along the coast and helicopters offering aerial views of the valley. The Kalalau Trail ends near Honopū Valley.

== Honopū Valley in film ==
Aircraft and boats that are part of Hollywood film productions are the only ones allowed in Honopū Valley. Honopū Valley is perhaps most famous for its appearances in the 1976 remake of King Kong and in the 1998 movie Six Days Seven Nights.

In the 1976 remake of King Kong the beaches and jungles of Kauai, Hawaii stood in for South Pacific. Originally only the jungle scenes were to be shot in Hawaii and the rest on Zuma Beach, California. Producer Dino De Laurentiis, however, was so pleased with Hawaii that he decided to film all the beach scenes at Honopū and Kalalau Valley. The producers and production crew of King Kong were told that Honopū Valley was uninhabited, but on the day that they arrived to start filming, they were shocked to find honeymooners on the beach. Scenes that involved filming in the ocean were hard to film due to the 12-foot-high waves. Most of the crew got seasick and one filming boat almost capsized. Examples of involved scenes are when the party arrive on Skull Island and the nighttime arrival to rescue Dwan; other scenes are the arrival of equipment to capture King Kong and Fred Wilson directing the rescue mission.

For the film Six Days Seven Nights, Hawaii stood in for French Polynesia. Among the scenes filmed on Honopū Beach is the one in which Harrison Ford runs from pirates. The arch is also included in the film.

Other Hollywood movies filmed in Honopū Valley include Honeymoon in Vegas, Acapulco Gold, and Raiders of the Lost Ark. More recently the beach and surrounding scenery were used as location for the fourth in the Pirates of the Caribbean series of movies, On Stranger Tides (2011).
