= Hāʻena, Hawaiʻi County, Hawaii =

Hāʻena, Hawaii
- Unincorporated community
- Location within Hawaii
- Coordinates: 19°38′37″N 154°59′01″W
- Country: United States
- State: Hawaii
- County: Hawaiʻi
- Elevation: 7 ft (2.1 m)
- Time zone: UTC-10 (Hawaii-Aleutian)
- Area code: 808
- GNIS feature ID: 358840

Hāʻena is an unincorporated community on the island of Hawaiʻi in Hawaiʻi County, Hawaii, United States. The community is located at a beach on the eastern side of the island, 9 miles (14 km) southeast of Hilo.
