= Schiedea attenuata =

Conservation status
- Critically endangered, possibly extinct in the wild (IUCN 3.1)

- Critically Imperiled (NatureServe)

Scientific classification
- Kingdom: Plantae
- Clade: Tracheophytes
- Clade: Angiosperms
- Clade: Eudicots
- Order: Caryophyllales
- Family: Caryophyllaceae
- Genus: Schiedea
- Species: S. attenuata

Binomial name
- Schiedea attenuata W.L.Wagner, S.G.Weller & A.K.Sakai

Species of flowering plant

Schiedea attenuata is a rare species of flowering plant in the family Caryophyllaceae known by the common name Kalalau schiedea. It is endemic to Hawaii, where it is known only from the Kalalau Valley on the island of Kauai. It is threatened by the degradation of its habitat. It was federally listed as an endangered species of the United States in 2010.

This plant is a shrub growing up to about 75 centimeters tall. It is covered in tiny, curved, purplish hairs. The oppositely arranged leaves have thick, somewhat fleshy blades which are linear to lance-shaped and measure up to 7 centimeters long by less than a centimeter wide. The inflorescence is an open cyme of up to 55 flowers. The flower has small lance-shaped green sepals and no petals.

This shrub grows on very steep basalt cliffs on the slopes of the Kalalau Valley of Kauai. Other plants in the habitat include Gouania meyenii, Peucedanum sandwicense, Poa mannii, Hedyotis sp., Lysimachia glutinosa, Melicope pallida, Dubautia sp., Dryopteris unidentata, Metrosideros polymorpha, Coprosma sp., Vaccinium sp., Lipochaeta sp., Wilkesia sp., Lobelia niihauensis, Lepidium serra, Nestegis sandwicensis, and Hibiscus kokio. When the plant was first described in 1994 there were only 20 individuals counted. By 2007 there had been no more plants discovered.

One major threat to the species is the feral goat population. It is also threatened by the invasion of non-native plants into its habitat. Because there are only a few plants of this species, it could face extinction in any one major event, such as a hurricane.
