= Barking Sands Beach =

Beach in Hawaii, United States

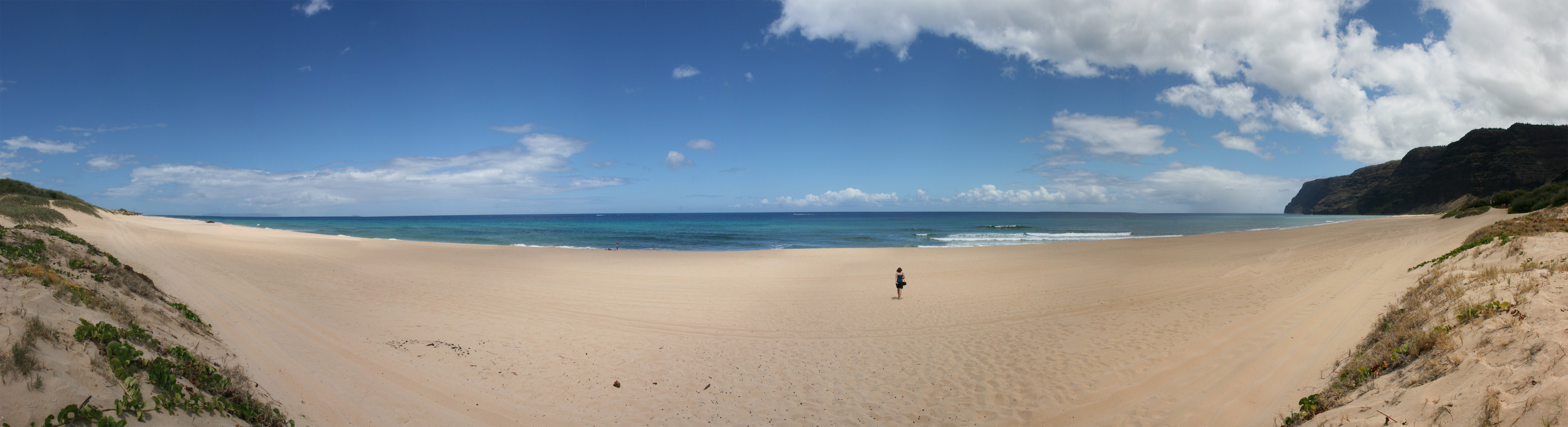

Highest point
- Coordinates: 22.0004°N 159.7708°W

Geography
- Location: Kauaʻi, Hawaii, United States

Geology
- Mountain type: dune
- Rock type: sand

Barking Sands Beach is a dune landscape of the Polihale Beach on the west coast of Kauaʻi in the U.S. state of Hawaii. You can hear a barking noise, when the sand moves.

== History ==
The native Hawaiians already mentioned the beach in their traditional songs, in which they describe the special features of their respective isles, and named it Keonekani o Nohili ("the sounding beach of Nohili"). In 1875, W.R. Frink wrote a letter about the beach's special features to the California Academy of Sciences. ″If you take two handful of the sand and, you can hear a noise sounding similar to the howling of an owl [..] The loudest noise we made was, when a local lay down on his stomach and was pulled down the slope by his feet by another person."

In 1921, the region of the Barking Sands was purchased by Kekaha Sugar Company, who built a runway for private planes. Seven years later, the Australian Charles Kingsford Smith successfully made a historical flight from Barking Sands across Fiji to Australia, flying a Fokker F.VII. In 1940, the United States Army took over the ownership of the runway, tarred it and named it Mana Airport. During World War II, a number of flights have been accomplished at Mana Airport. In 1954, the runway was renamed Bonham Air Force Base; in 1958, the Pacific Missile Range Facility was founded.

== Scientific explanation ==
Dr. James Blake, a scientist of the California Academy of Sciences, who examined a sand sample in 1875, explained the phenomenon that the grains of sand all have more or less small holes that end in cavities and enlarge inwards. They communicated with the surface by a small opening. The structure of the sand grains is the reason, why you can hear noises, if they get moved. The mutual attrition leads to vibration in the cavities. As soon as the vibrations transfer to the air in the cavities, you can hear the sound. There are millions of reverberating cavities, Each of which making noises, which together make a loud sound. That tone can even sound like a thunderclap. However, that can only happen, if the sand is absolutely dry, because if the cavities are filled with water, the sand grains cannot generate vibrations. The sand on this beach consists of carbonates, unlike other sand grains that consist of quartz.

== Legends ==
The legend of Barking Sands Beach is about an old Hawaiian fisherman, named Nohili, who had lived in a hut at the beach with his nine dogs. He tethered his Dogs to three poles in the sand, three on each pole, when he wanted to go fishing. He forgot to untie his dogs, when he got back of an exhausting boat trip and storms. When he woke up the next morning, they had disappeared. On the spot where they once sat, there were now 3 small mounds of sand. When he stepped on one of them, he heard loud barking. He immediately thought that his dogs were buried in sand and started to dig. However, his efforts were in vain and the fisherman gave up in the end. Each day, on which he then crossed the beach, he could hear the deep barking.

The beach is appearing in the legends "Ke one kani o Nohili" in the book: Wichmann, Frederick B., Polihale and Other Kauai Legends, “Kapahe, Captain of the Nihau Whale Boat“ in the book: Knudsen, Eric A., Teller of Hawaiian Tales, “Kawelu, the Shark God“ in the book: Teller of Hawaiian Tales and “The Heiau of Polihale“, also in the book: Teller of Hawaiian Tales.

== Limited access ==
Access to the beach is closed for the general public as it is located in a restricted military exclusion zone.

== Literature ==
- Beaches of Kaua'i and Ni'ihau, John R. K. Clark, University of Hawaii Press, 1990, ISBN 9780824812607, S. 49
