= Kalalau Trail =

Trail along Nā Pali Coast of the island of Kauai in the state of Hawaii, U.S.

Coordinates: 22°12′01″N 159°37′13″W

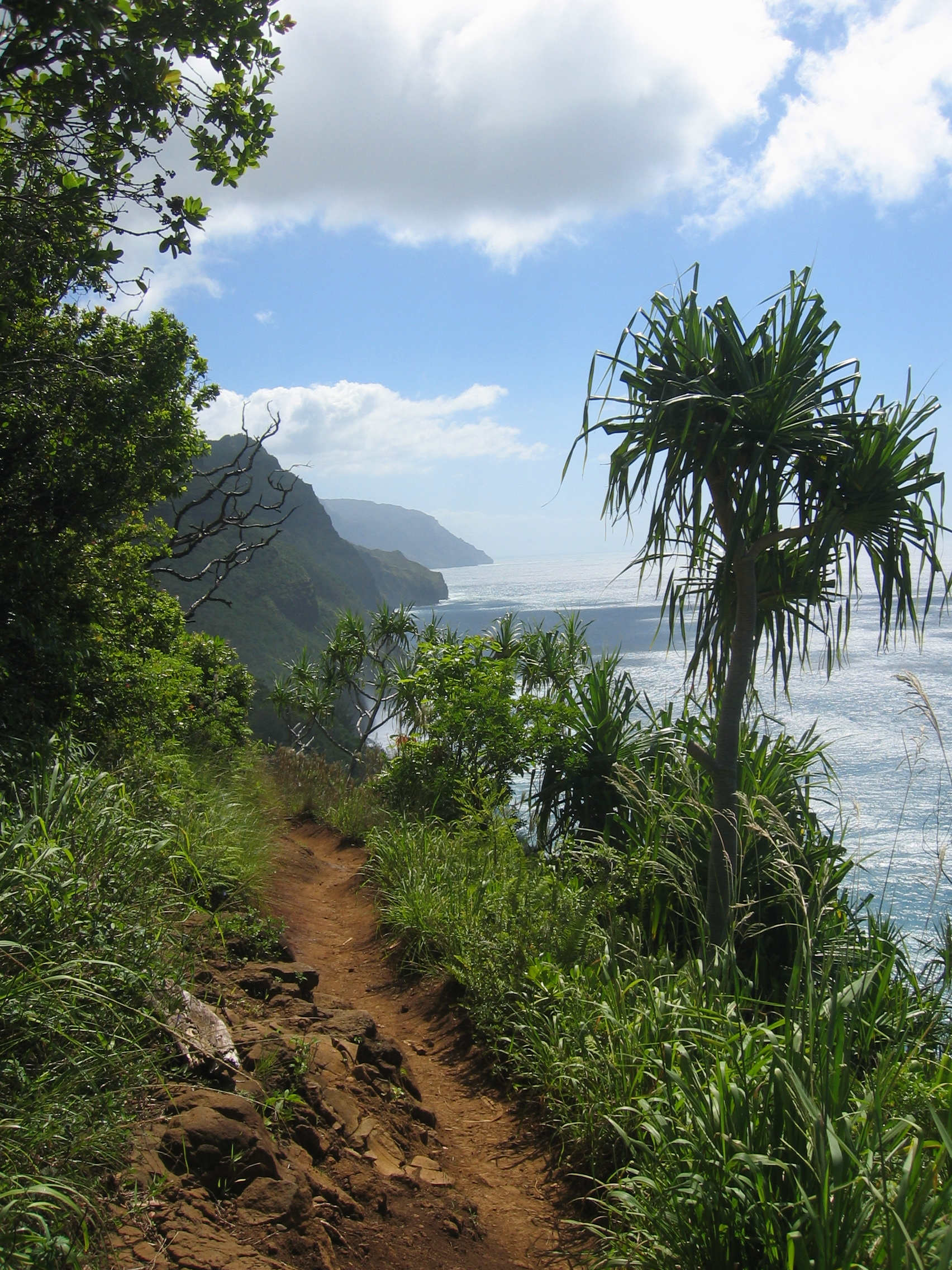
Along the Kalalau Trail

The Kalalau Trail is a trail along Nā Pali Coast of the island of Kauai in the state of Hawaii. The trail runs approximately 11 miles (18 km) along the island's north shore from Keʻe Beach to the Kalalau Valley. The trail has been named one of the most beautiful, and dangerous, hikes of the United States.

== Route ==
Expert hikers or trail runners can complete the roundtrip 22 miles (35 km) trek in a day, but the average hiker requires a two-day minimum and will camp along the trail. Camping is only permitted at a forested streamside campsite Hanakoa Valley (6 mile mark) and Kalalau Beach.

The first section of the trail is a 2 mile (3 km) stretch from Keʻe Beach to Hanakapiai stream and beach. This section is moderately strenuous and does not require a camping permit however does require reservations to enter the State Park. Reservations can be made at GoHaena.com The next section connects Hanakapiai stream to Hanakoa Valley, six miles from the trailhead. To continue past Hankapiai Beach to Hanakoa Valley, hikers must obtain a camping permit from the Hawai'i Department of Land and Natural Resources. No day-use permits are issued, and only hikers with valid camping permits may legally proceed beyond the sign. Violation of this rule is a petty misdemeanor under Hawaii law, and a conviction will result in a criminal record in addition to penalties.

Hanakoa Valley contains Hanakoa Falls and stream but the valley is a hanging valley with no access to the beach. The trail to Hanakoa Falls is not well maintained and sometimes difficult to follow. The trail begins after the Hanakoa stream crossing, just before the covered shelter.

The trail continues on to Kalalau Valley, a large, flat-bottomed valley almost a mile across. After hiking down Red Hill, it is about a half mile to Kalalau Beach requiring crossing Kalalau stream.

There are several water sources along the trail which allow hikers to refill and hydrate, but stream water is generally not safe to drink and requires treatment.

Camping permits are only issued for Kalalau Beach and are limited to 5 consecutive nights. Hikers are allowed to camp at Hanakoa Valley one night with a valid Kalalau permit.

The most strenuous part of the hike occurs after Hanakapiai Beach where the trail climbs from sea level to 800 feet (240 m) over 1 1/4 miles (2 km).

== Reviews ==
The Huffington Post named the hike "the most incredible" and "epic" trail in the United States, citing its impressive views of the Pacific Ocean, beaches, and valleys.

The narrow trail, three major stream crossings that can rapidly rise when raining, and falling rock have been cited as reasons for why the trail is one of the most dangerous in the world. In 2008, Backpacker Magazine listed it as one of the "10 Most Dangerous Hikes" in the US. Outside magazine rated it as one of "The 20 Most Dangerous Hikes" in the world, noting that in addition to the dangers of the trail itself, more than 100 people have died swimming on the trail's remote beaches.

== Notable incidents ==
A fatality occurred in June 2012 at Kalalau Beach campsite when a 30-year-old woman fell to her death near the beach waterfall.

Another incident occurred in December 2012 when a 31-year-old Japanese national was pushed from a cliff along the trail and was critically injured. Police, firefighters, and officers with the Hawaii Department of Land and Natural Resources closed the trail and conducted a four-day search for the alleged perpetrator, Justin Wynn Klein. Klein was apprehended months later in Wailua on April 6, 2013 and subsequently indicted for attempted second-degree murder. Klein was later sentenced to five years in prison.

In February 2013 a woman drowned while trying to cross Hanakapiai stream during a flash flood. Fifty-four hikers were stranded overnight.

On April 6, 2014, the Kauai County Fire Department had to rescue 121 hikers over a two-day period when several streams became impassable because of heavy rain.

In August 2014 According to the Kauai Police Department, a hiker died when he fell over the edge and landed on the rocks roughly 50 feet below. The accident occurred at approximately 7 p.m. near mile marker 7 of the Kalalau Trail, in an area known as Red Hill.

== Photographs and images ==
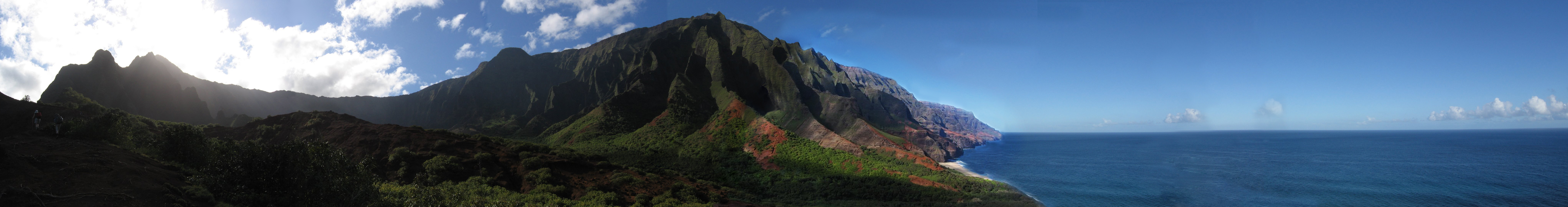
Panoramic view from the Kalalau trail of the Kalalau Valley and beach

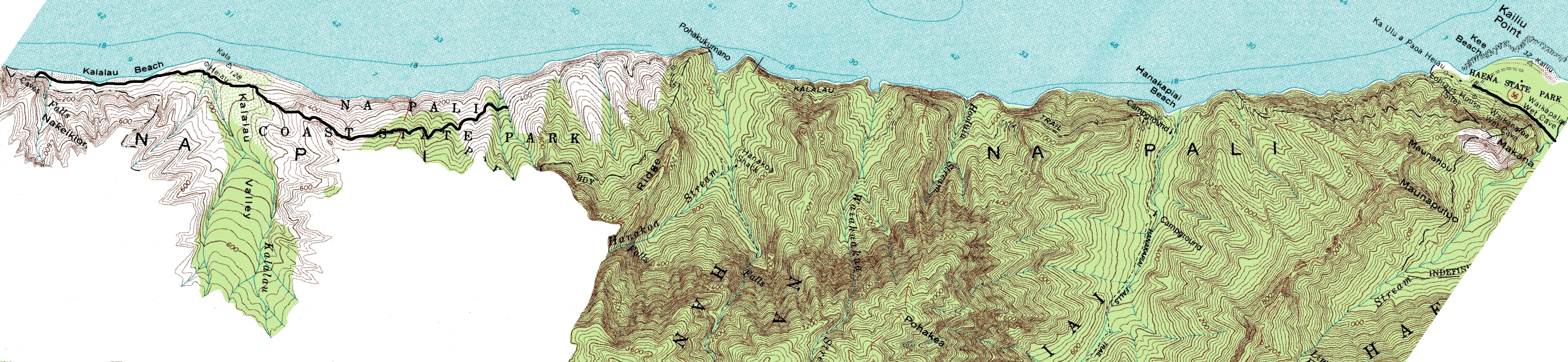
Edited version of a high resolution USGS topographical chart of the Kalalau Trail. On the left portion of the image the Kalalau Valley below 800 feet elevation is shown. Also, a portion of the Kalalau Trail is shown as a black line. On the top right portion of the image the end of the paved road is shown as a black line.

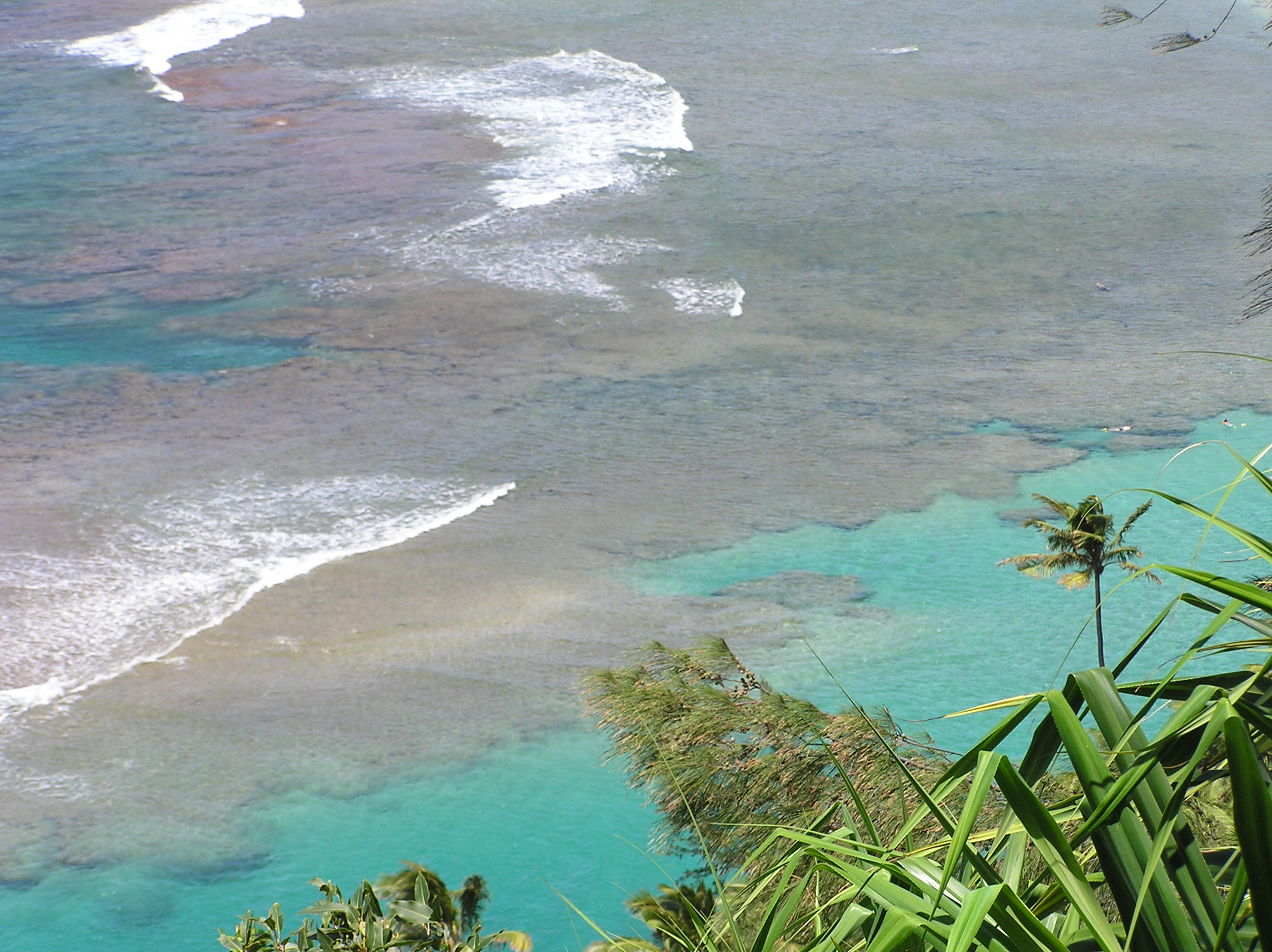
Oceanview from Kalalau Trail
