= Hanakāpīʻai Falls =

Coordinates: 22°11′08″N 159°35′42″W

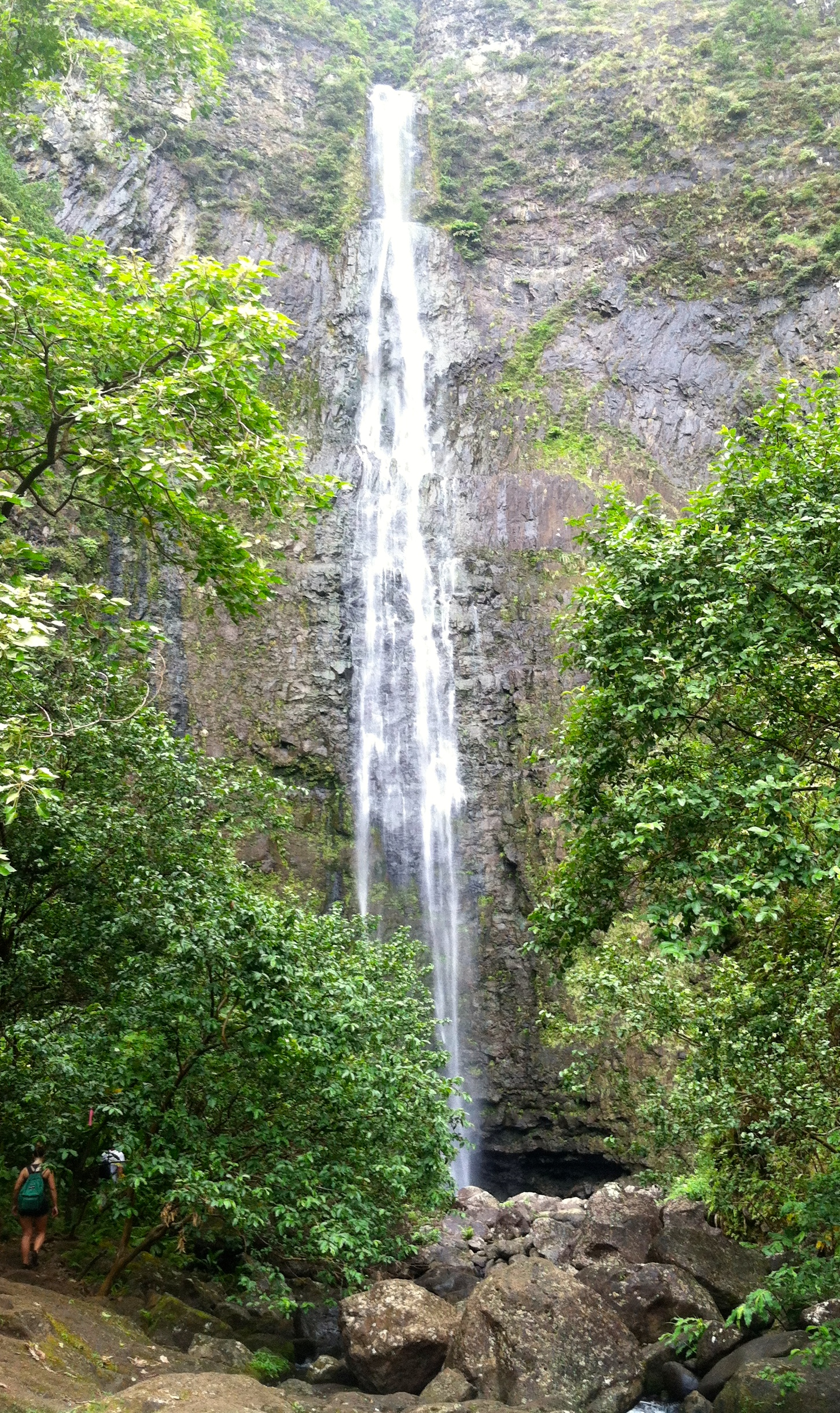
Hanakāpīʻai Falls, Hawaii, August 2014

Hanakāpīʻai Falls is an approximately 300-foot (91 m) high waterfall located in Hawaii, United States on the Na Pali side of the island of Kauai. It requires a hike of approximately 2 miles (3.2 km) from Hanakāpīʻai Beach. The trail is a popular day-hike for able-bodied hikers.

== See also ==
- List of waterfalls
- List of Hawaii waterfalls
