= Hāʻena State Park =

Shoreline park in Kauai County, Hawaii, US

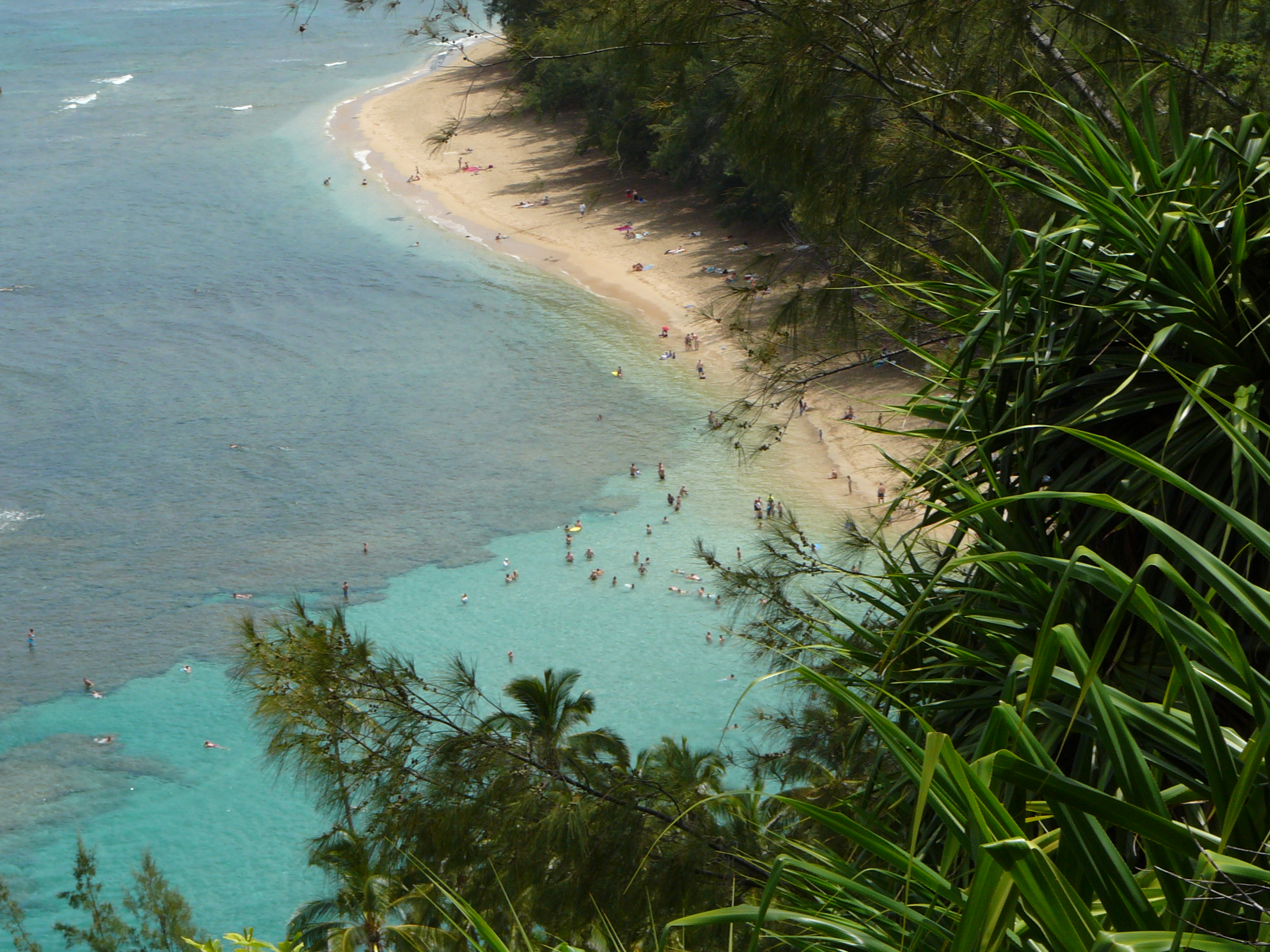
- Keʻe Beach from the Kalalau Trail

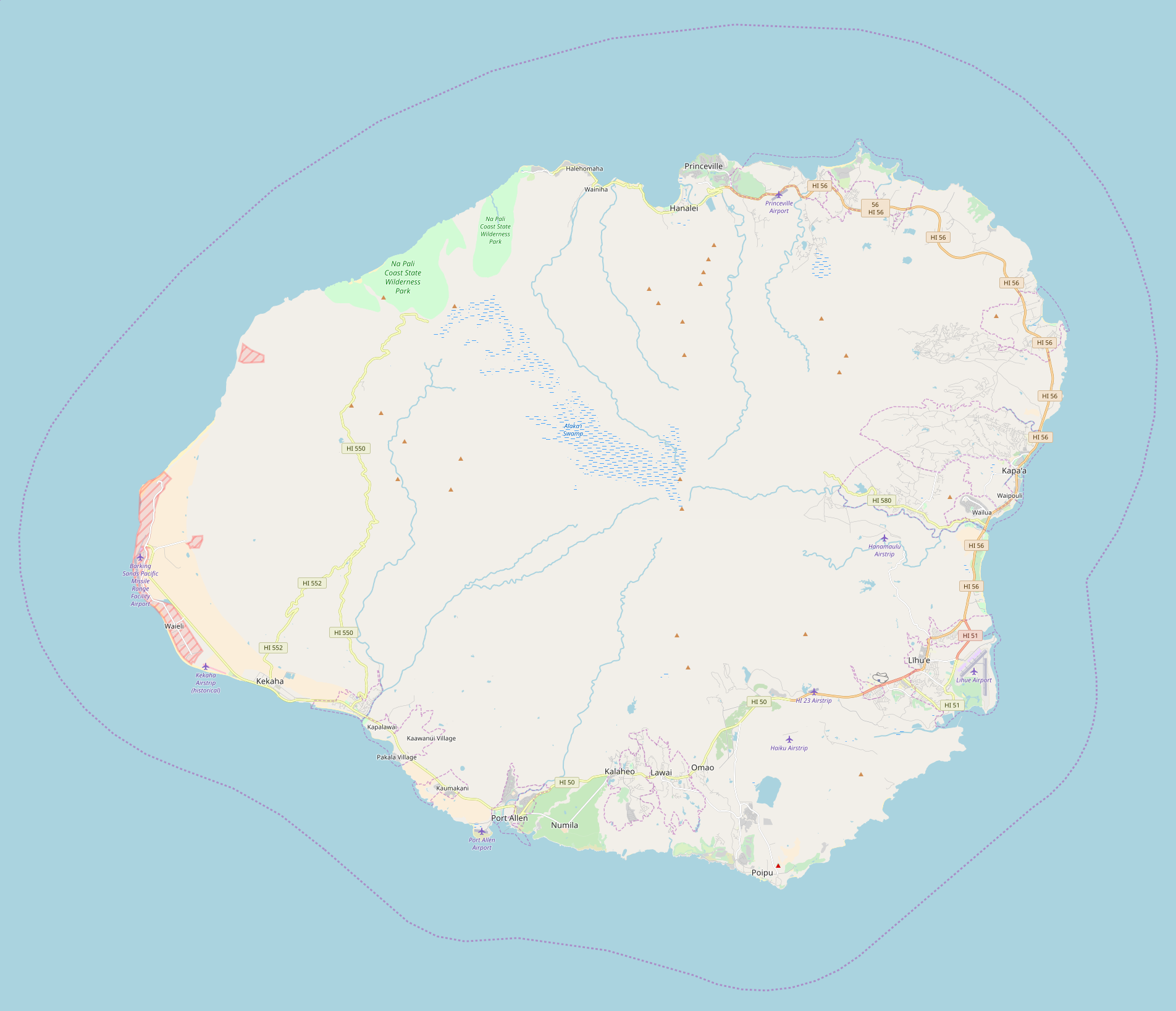
- Location within Kauai Location within Hawaii
- Location: Hawaii, U.S.
- Nearest city: Hanalei, Hawaii
- Coordinates: 22°13′15″N 159°34′42″W
- Area: 230 acres (93 ha)
- Governing body: Hawai'i Department of Land and Natural Resources
- Website: www.hawaiistateparks.org/parks/hawaii/Index.cfm?park_id=8

Hāʻena State Park is a state park on the north shore of the Hawaiian island of Kauaʻi. It is often called the "end of the road" and marks the endpoint of the Kuhio Highway. The park provides access to beaches, trails, and several ancient Hawaiian sites, including sea caves estimated to be more than 4,000 years old. Archaeological sites associated with the hula, including a heiau (shrine) dedicated to Laka, are above the park's beaches.

== Description ==
The beach has a relatively safe lagoon, but very strong currents have been reported at the bay, especially in the winter. Amenities at the park include pay phones, picnic tables, restrooms, and outdoor showers.

Limahuli Stream enters the ocean at the park's eastern edge. South of the park, Makana mountain soars above Limahuli Garden and Preserve in the valley. Just before the Kēʻē beach is the Kalalau Trail trailhead, an 11-mile (18 km) footpath that is the only land access to Nā Pali Coast State Park. The area surrounding the beaches is vegetated by ironwood trees, coconut palms, ti, and guava.

A little over an hour's drive from Lihue and 5 miles (8.0 km) west of Hanalei, Hawaii, the 230-acre park (93 ha) is at the terminus of the Kuhio Highway (Hawaii Route 560). A parking reservation with an entry fee is required. The daily limit is 900 people.

== Beaches ==
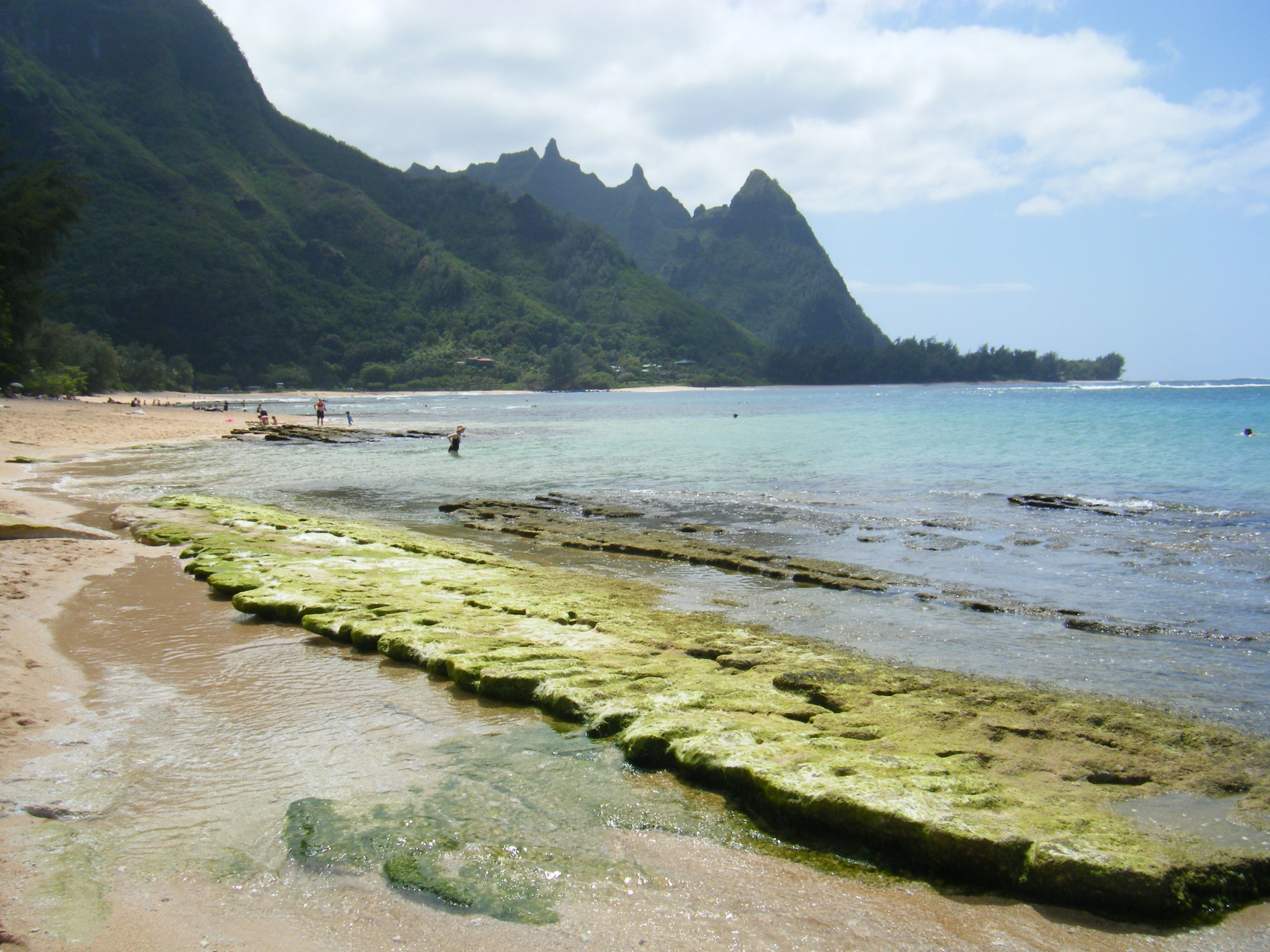
Haʻena, looking west

- Kēʻē Beach is at the park's western edge. This beach is west of Tunnels Beach (a.k.a. "Makua Beach" at Haena Point), which refers to the large waves thought to be ideal for surfing. Kēʻē Beach has a unique reef lagoon that makes the water calm and attractive for snorkeling and swimming. Beyond the reef, very strong currents, especially in the winter, have been reported. Kēʻē means "avoidance", referring to stories in Hawaiian mythology about the goddess Pele and Lohiʻau.
- Hāʻena Beach is just east of Haʻena State Park. Haena is Hawaiian for "red hot". The beach is located at 22°13′17″N 159°33′41″W.

== Management ==
During the park's extended closure because of the 2018 flood damage to Kuhio Highway, a parking and concession agreement was negotiated with a local nonprofit. The park is a destination management example for state parks that are environmentally, culturally, or historically unique.
