= Kahauloa Crater =

Tuff cone located in Hawaii

- Location within Hawaii

Highest point
- Elevation: 92 ft (28 m)
- Coordinates: 21°16′35″N 157°41′23″W

Geography
- Location: Honolulu County, Hawaii, United States

Geology
- Mountain type: Tuff cone
- Last eruption: Unknown

Kahauloa Crater is a tuff cone located in Hawaii. It sits between Koko Crater and Hanauma Bay. The Koko Head Shooting Complex operates in its crater.

== Geology ==
Kahauloa Crater formed out of eruptions by the Koʻolau Range during its rejuvenating stage. These eruptions are known as the Honolulu Volcanic Series, which also created other nearby tuff cones such as the famous Diamond Head.

Pyroclastic units in Hanauma Bay indicate that both the craters of Hanauma and Kahauloa likely had overlapping eruptions at one point.

== See also ==
- Koko Head
- Hanauma Bay
- Honolulu Volcanics
