= Tantalus (Oahu) =

Mountain located in Hawaii, U.S.

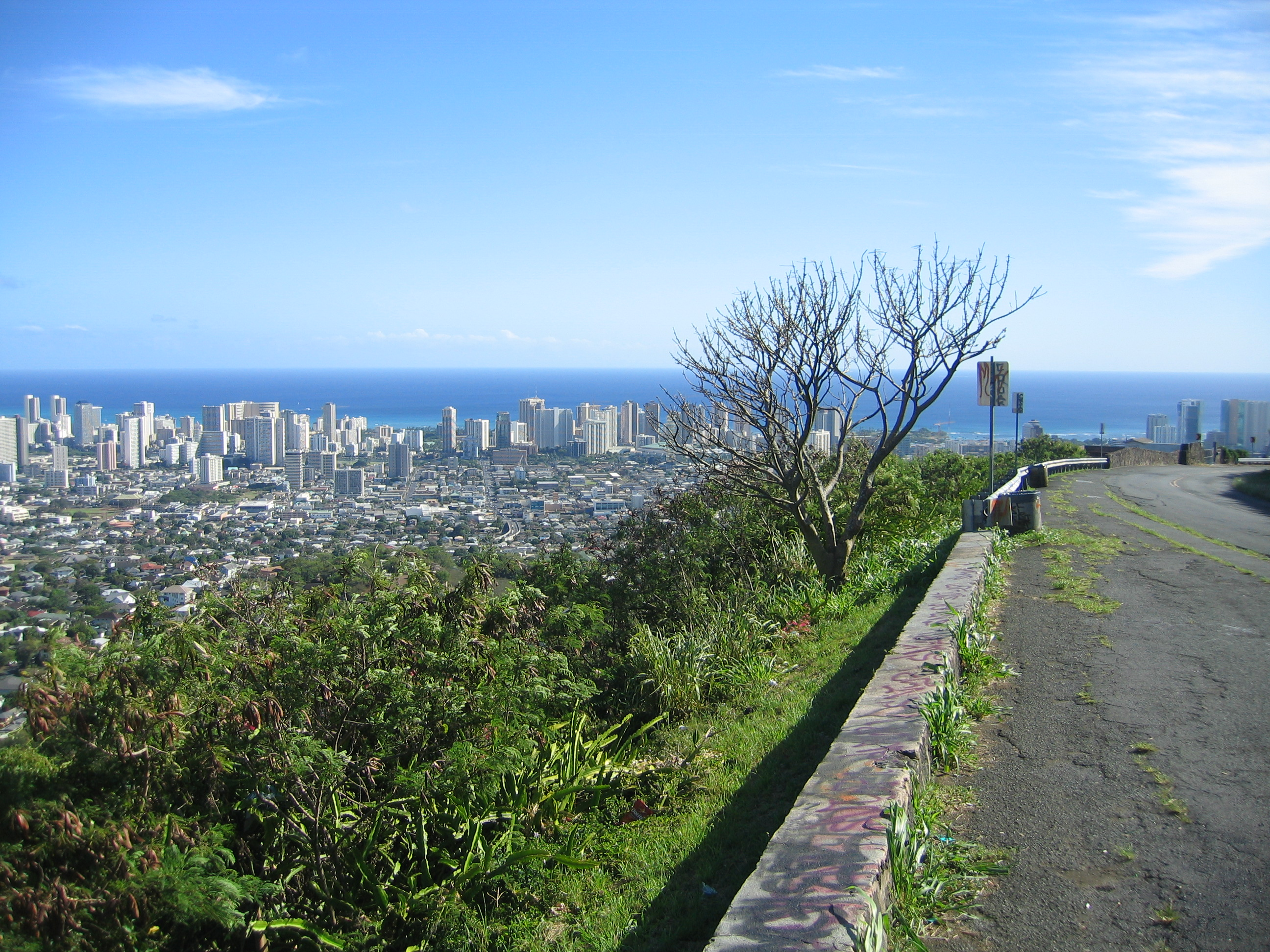
- A view of Honolulu seen from Tantalus (2008)

Highest point
- Elevation: 2,014 ft (614 m)
- Coordinates: 21°19′57.58″N 157°48′53.34″W

Geography
- Location: Honolulu County, Hawaiʻi, U.S.
- Parent range: Hawaiian Islands
- Topo map: USGS Honolulu

Geology
- Rock age: Greater than 10,000 years
- Mountain type: Cinder cone

Climbing
- Easiest route: Paved road

Mount Tantalus (Puʻu ʻōhiʻa) is an extinct cinder cone in the southern Koʻolau Range on the Hawaiian Island of Oʻahu. It also has a summit crater, Tantalus Crater. The cinder cone formed after the demise of Koʻolau Volcano, during a time of rejuvenated-stage volcanism in southeastern Oʻahu that also formed Punchbowl Crater, Diamond Head and Koko Head as part of the Honolulu Volcanics. Tantalus overlooks the modern city of Honolulu, which is built on top of Tantalus cinders.

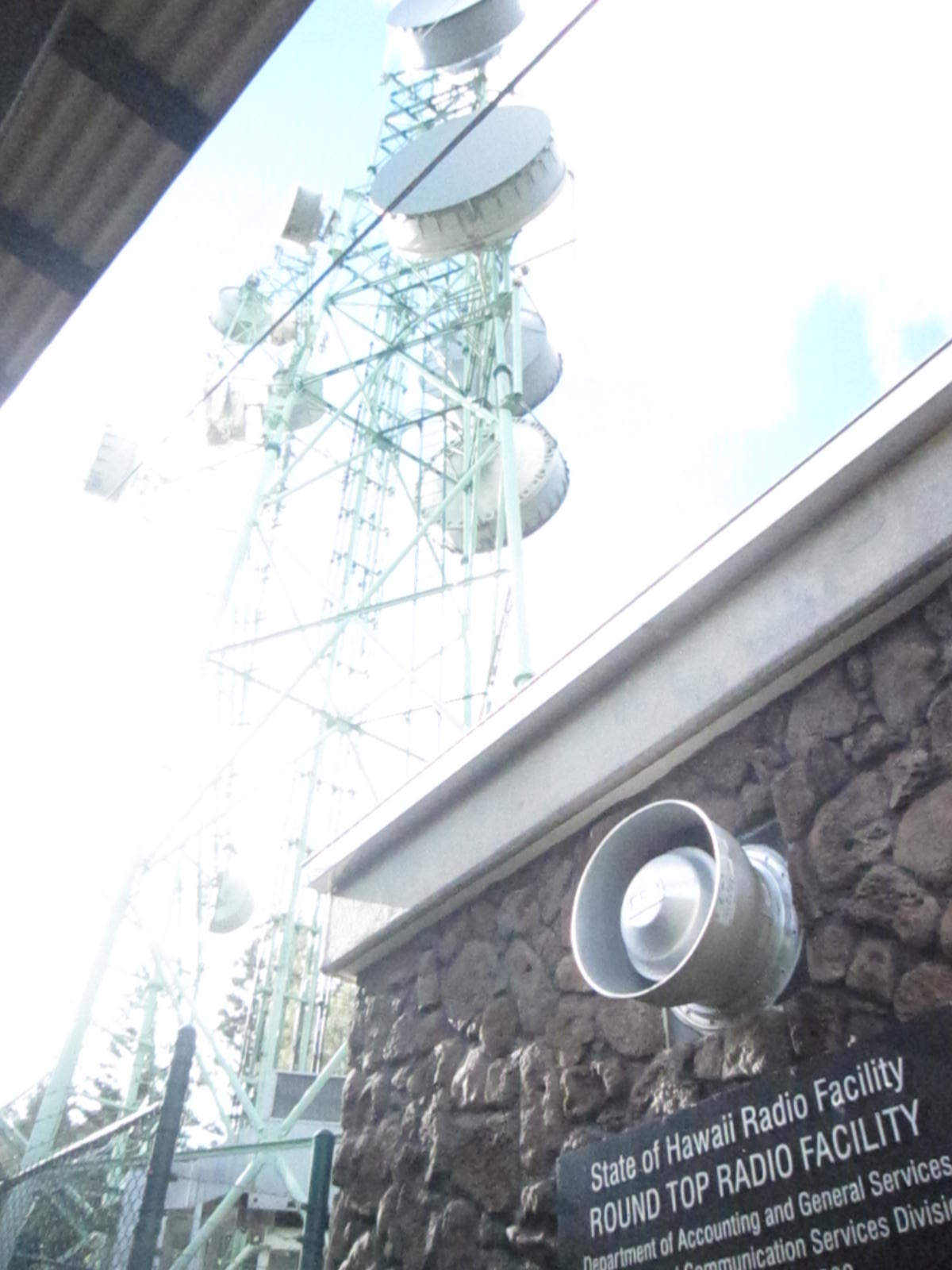
The radio transmitter at the Round Top summit in Tantalus

== History ==
The 6-mile (9.7 km) Tantalus Loop was a popular wagon trail from the late 1800s for views and picnic parties. It had "rugged canyons, wooded valleys, aromatic eucalyptus giants, stag-horn fern, pungent guava", monkeypod, shower cassias, and myrtle, with a two-room, corrugated-roofed "Half-Way House", managed by 1900s forester David Haugh, offering a welcome stop for trekkers. Many immigrant families of note settled there "in cool picturesque seclusion", including the Waterhouses, Giffords, Wilders, Dickeys, Davies, Isenbergs, Browns, and Alexanders. A 25-foot (7.6 m) cliff of pitch-black volcanic sand was an attraction on Tantalus until it was mined for blacktopping paths and yards.

As part of the U.S. Army's coastal artillery defense system, a fire-control station was built on Tantalus. In conjunction with the fire-control station at Diamond Head, the two positions were used to control coast artillery batteries: at Fort DeRussey and Fort Ruger. The southern slope of Tantalus was bombed in Operation K, Japan's unsuccessful second attack on Oʻahu, which took place March 4, 1942.

Today, Tantalus is a popular destination for hikers, road bicyclists, and skateboarders as well as one of the most frequented tourist spots on Oʻahu. Starting in 1974, The Tantalus Time Trial, a bicycle race from the bottom to the top of the loop, is the longest continuously running cycling race in Hawai‘i.

== Etymology ==
Tantalus was named in the 19th century by students from Honolulu's Punahou School for Tantalus, the mythological Greek whose eternal punishment in Hades was to be frustrated and tempted by food and water receding out of his reach, unable to quench his thirst or hunger. "Perhaps similarly, as the students climbed, the peak seemed always to recede." This group of students also named other Hawaiian summits like Olympus, Round Top and Sugarloaf.

== Popular culture ==
Tantalus Crater is a setting in the novel Micro by Michael Crichton and Richard Preston.
