= Makapuʻu Point =

Easternmost point on Oahu, Hawaii

Coordinates: 21°18′50″N 157°39′07″W

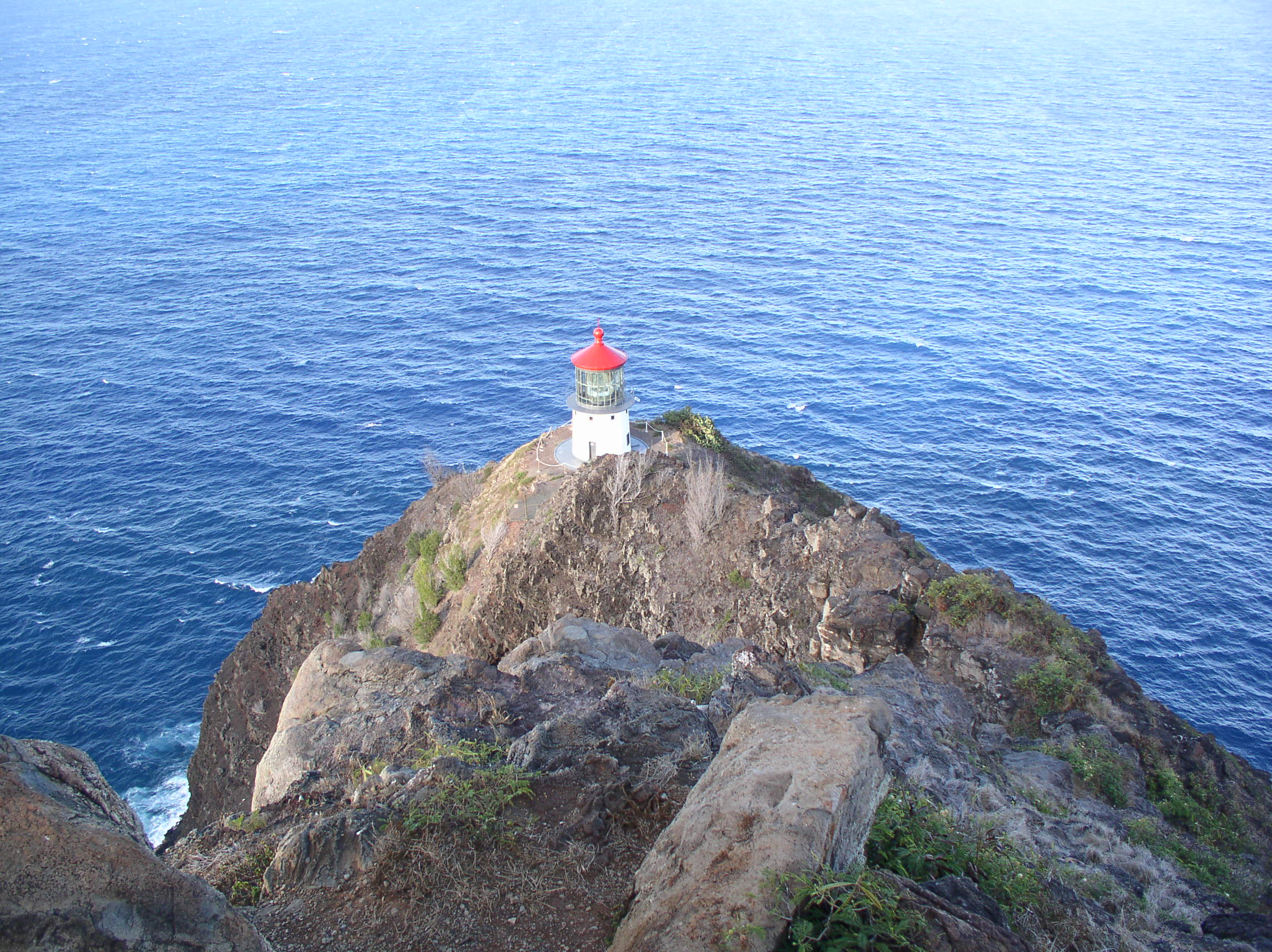
Makapuʻu Point Lighthouse

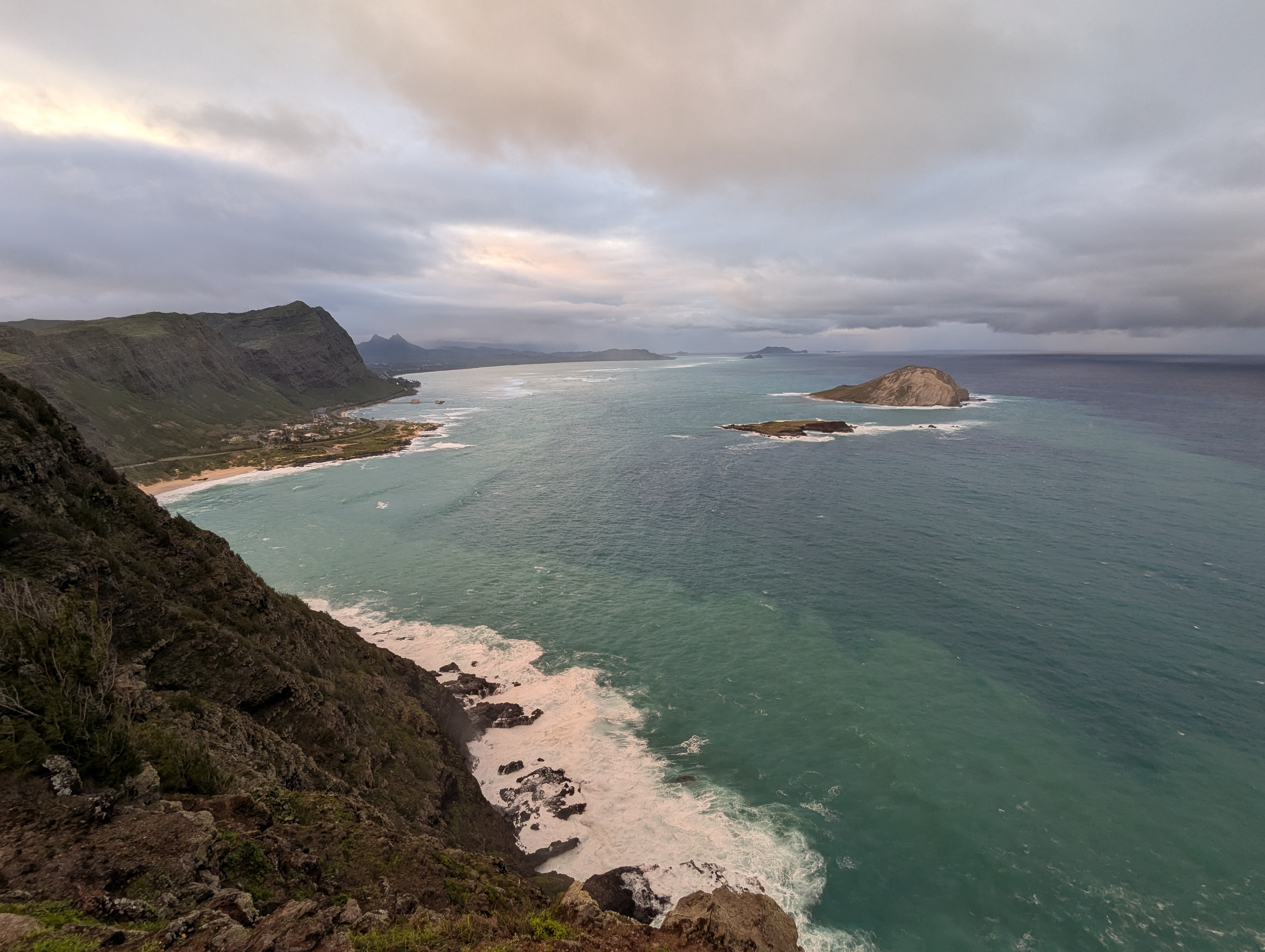
View north, including Makapuʻu Beach Park and Mānana and Kāohikaipu islets

Makapuʻu Point is the easternmost point on the Hawaiian island of Oʻahu, located in the Makapuʻu region. Twelve miles east of Honolulu, it is a popular hiking spot, offering great views of Makapuʻu and Waimanalo Bay on one side and the Ka ʻIwi Channel on the other side. It is the home of the Makapuʻu Point Light, which was established in 1909; the light was automated in 1974. The lighthouse contains one of the world's largest Fresnel lenses. According to Neal McHenry, the procedure to produce another 12-foot (3.7 m) high Hyper-Radiant Fresnel Lens is no longer known. The Light House is lit by a single 1,000-watt, 120-volt alternating current lamp. Should the first lamp burn out, a tangent lamp will automatically rotate into place. The lighthouse and the area around it are owned by the U.S. Coast Guard.

The location is also popular for viewing the ocean, whale watching in the winter, or seeing the neighboring islands of Molokai and Lanai. Additionally, one of the popular "first kisses" from the romantic comedy, 50 First Dates, was filmed beside the lighthouse with the camera spanning the picturesque landscape.

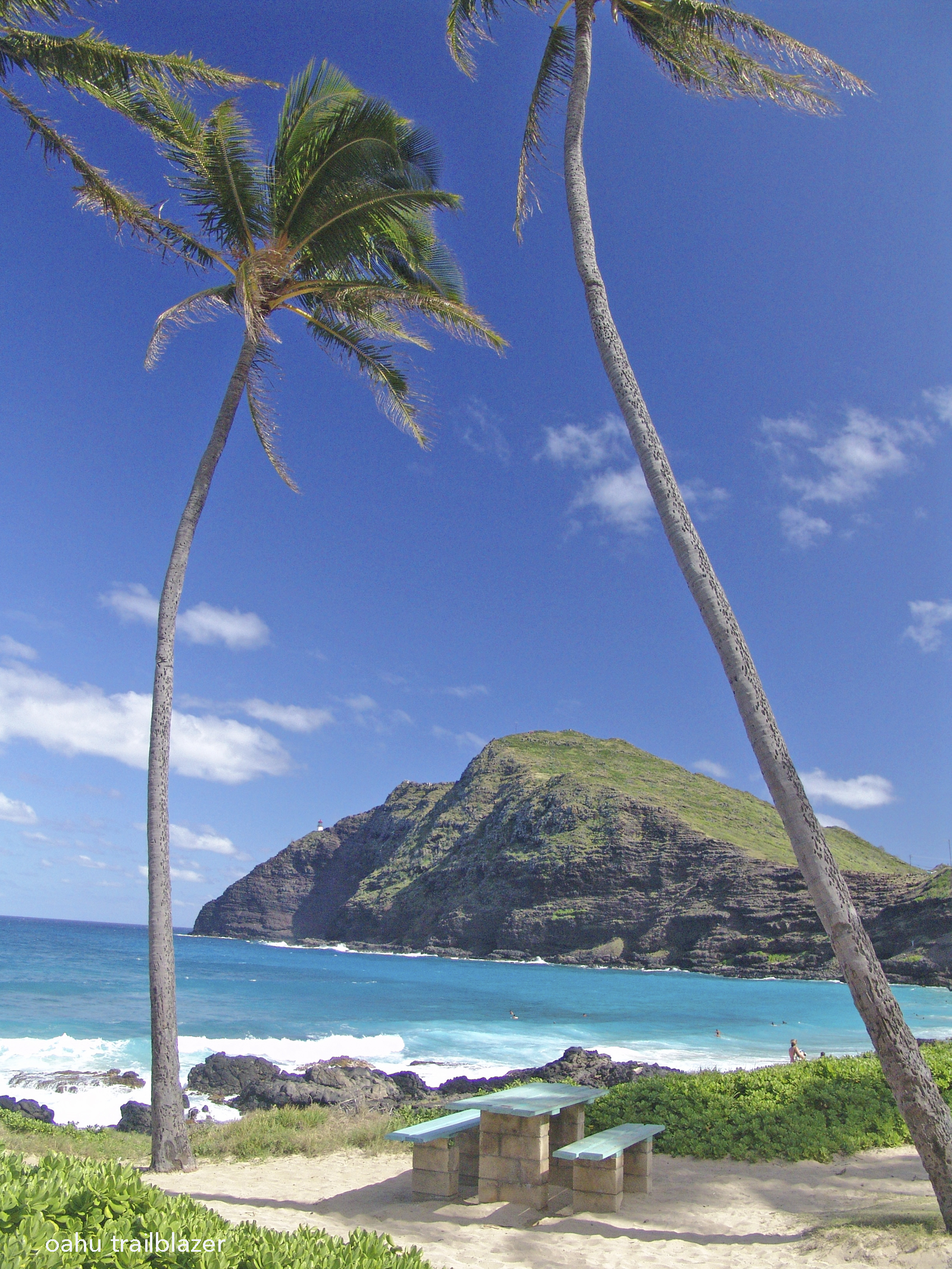
Makapuu Beach Park picnic area
