= Honolulu Volcanics =

Volcanic field in Oʻahu, Hawaiʻi

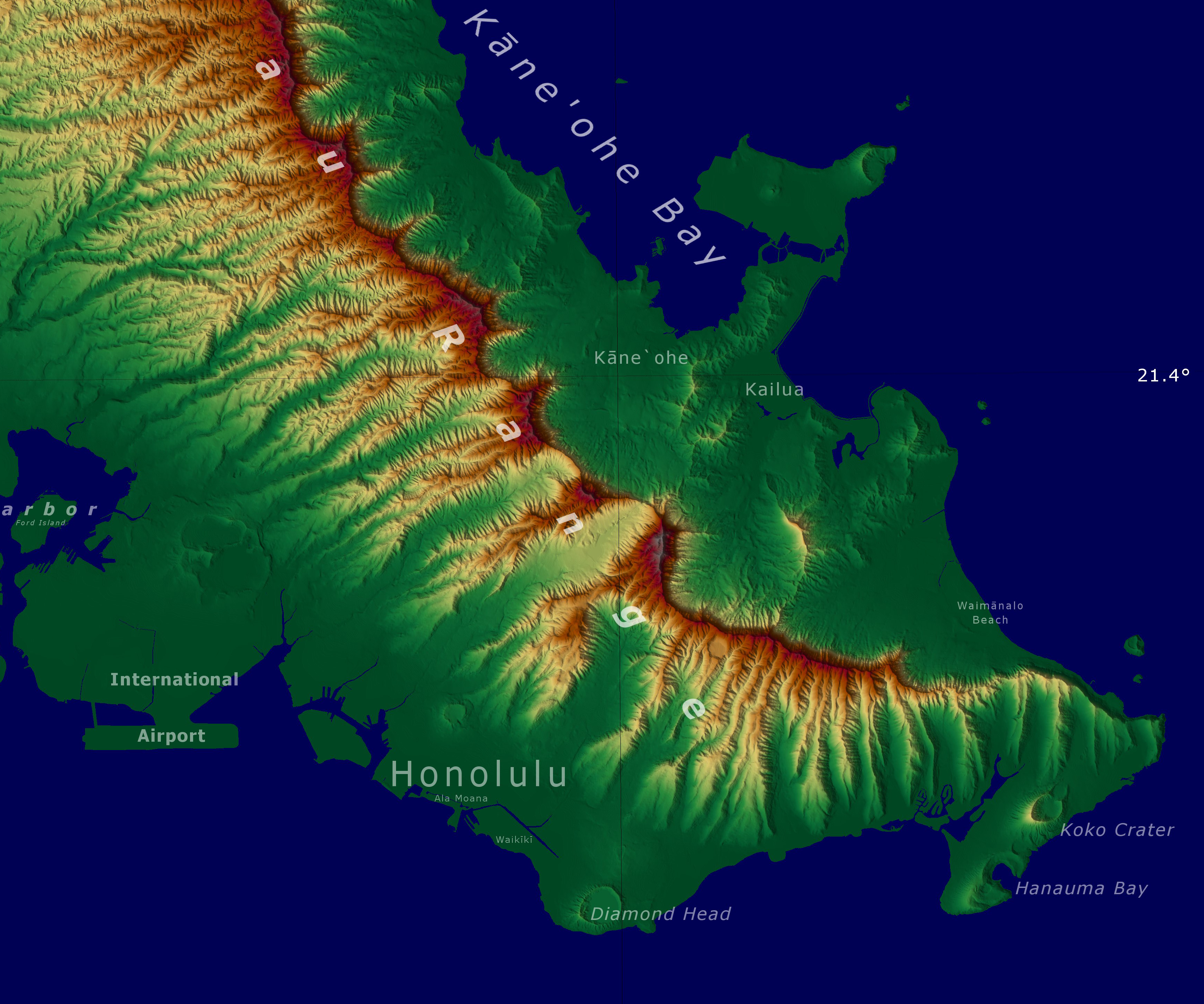
- Topography of southeastern Oʻahu

Highest point
- Coordinates: 21.37°N 157.8°W

Geography
- Location within Hawaii

The Honolulu Volcanics are a group of volcanoes which form a volcanic field on the island of Oʻahu, Hawaiʻi, more specifically in that island's southeastern sector and in the city of Honolulu from Pearl Harbor to the Mokapu Peninsula. It is part of the rejuvenated stage of Hawaiian volcanic activity, which occurred after the main stage of volcanic activity on Oʻahu that built the Koʻolau volcano. These volcanoes formed through dominantly explosive eruptions and gave rise to cinder cones, lava flows, tuff cones and volcanic islands. Among these are well known landmarks such as Diamond Head and Punchbowl Crater.

Volcanic activity began less than one million years ago and occurred at between 40 and 30 separate volcanic vents, some of which are submarine. Sea level varied during the activity of the volcanic field, and some volcanic eruptions have been dated through correlation with individual sea level fluctuations. The field erupted various kinds of lavas of mostly basaltic type with a high content of xenoliths. During eruptions, ascending magma often underwent interactions with water and thus caused steam explosions and the formation of particular volcanic structures such as tuff cones. The last eruption took place 35,000 or 76,000 years ago and future hazardous eruptions are possible.

== Geography and geomorphology ==
The Honolulu Volcanics are a series of volcanoes in the southeastern sector of Oʻahu and includes dikes, lava flows, spatter cones, tephra deposits, tuff cones, and mesas where the surrounding terrain has been eroded away. Vents span the area southeast of a line between Mokapu Peninsula and Pearl Harbor, and extend from the ridges of Koʻolau volcano to below sea level and to the coast plain of southern Oʻahu.

The system takes its name from Honolulu, the capital of Hawaiʻi, as craters are scattered in and around the city. The volcanic system includes well-known landmarks of Honolulu such as Diamond Head, Koko Head, Punchbowl Crater, Rabbit Island, Tantalus, Hanauma Bay (notable as a snorkeling site) and the Mokapu Peninsula, which is the location of Marine Corps Base Hawaiʻi. The United States military has made use of some of the volcanic islands that were formed by the Honolulu Volcanics. The Koko area is designated as the Koko Head Regional Park and Hanauma Bay is also a state park. Parts of this system are among the best known volcanic vents of Hawaiʻi.

About 30–40 vents have been identified. Most cinder cones on Oʻahu are quite large, over 76 metres (250 ft) high and up to 0.80 kilometres (0.5 mi) wide. Some of the lava flows filled deep valleys cut into the older Koʻolau volcano and displaced streams that previously ran through these valleys; for example, water passing over a lava flow in Kamanaiki Valley forms a waterfall. Together with sediments coming down from the mountains and coral reef growth, the deposits of the Honolulu Volcanics have formed the coastal plain on which the city of Honolulu and military installations are built.

The vents of the Honolulu Volcanics follow northeastward-trending alignments that are at right angles to the rift zone of the Koʻolau volcano. From northwest to southeast these are the Haʻikū Rift, the Tantalus Rift, the Kaimukī/Kaʻau Rift and the Koko Head/Koko Rift, but each rift has had eruptions at different times and with different compositions. It is not clear whether these alignments are in any way related to the structure of the previous Koʻolau volcano, instead of being controlled by the crust of the Pacific Ocean, but the trends along the Koko and Tantalus Rifts are parallel to that of the flexural arch (Note: The flexural arch is a structure formed when the crust under Hawaiʻi Island sags and bends under the weight of the growing volcanoes.) of Hawaiʻi Island. There is also a hypothetical "Diamond Head fault" that may be associated with earthquakes on Oahu that occurred in 1948, 1951 and 1961–1981, but it is not parallel to these alignments and its very existence is questionable.

Submarine vents are also known, including a 300-metre (980 ft) high solitary cone with two ridges off northeast Oʻahu, which is covered by pillow lavas and volcaniclastic sediments. At least five cones are found off the southwestern extension of the Koko Rift where they are situated on a southwestward extending ridge. Another set of submarine vents is found south of Diamond Head. It was once proposed that some seamounts (underwater mountains) off northeastern Oʻahu such as Tuscaloosa Seamount are related to the volcanic series; today however they are considered to be fragments of the giant Nuʻuanu Slide off northeastern Oʻahu.

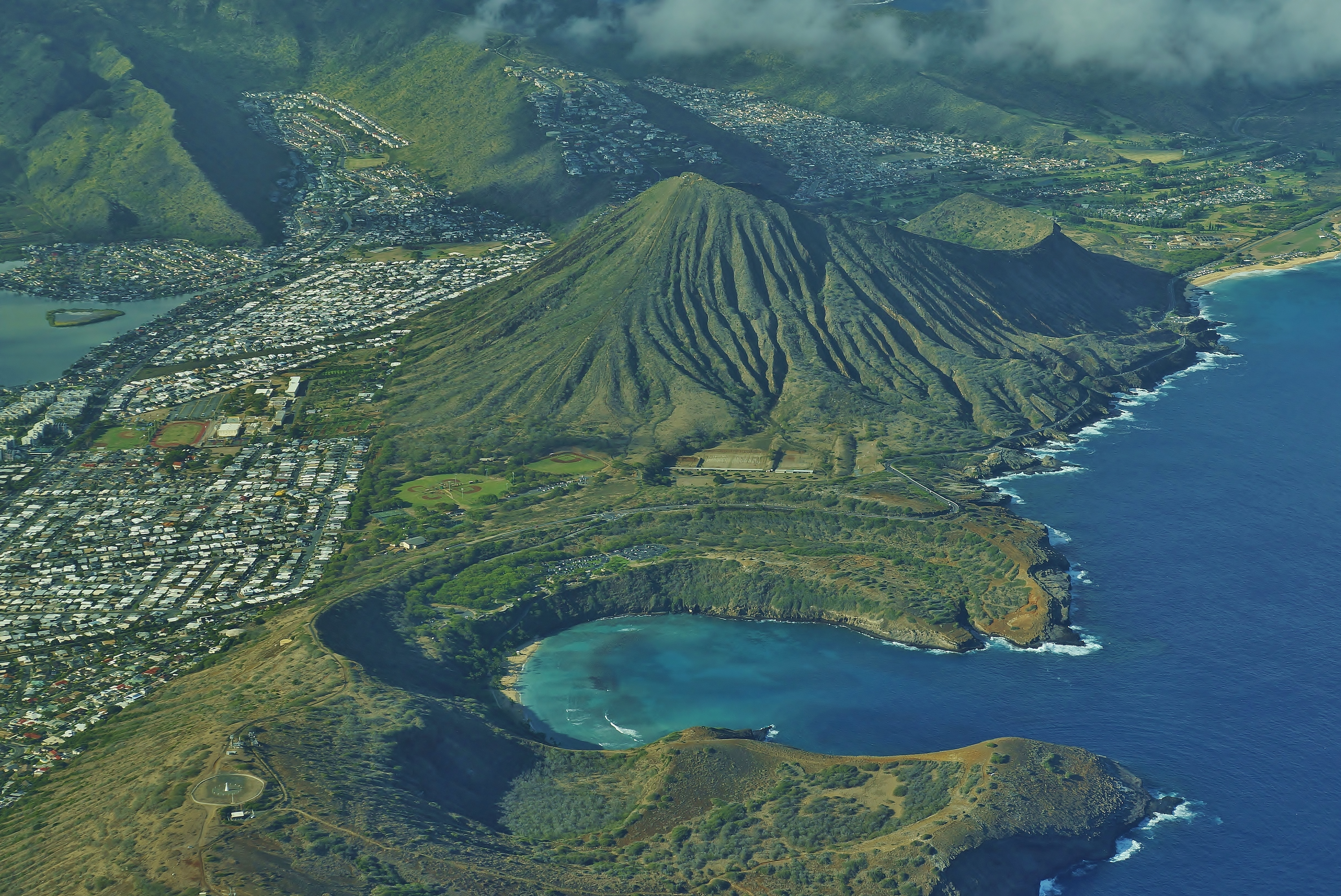
Hanauma Bay in the foreground, Koko is in the middle

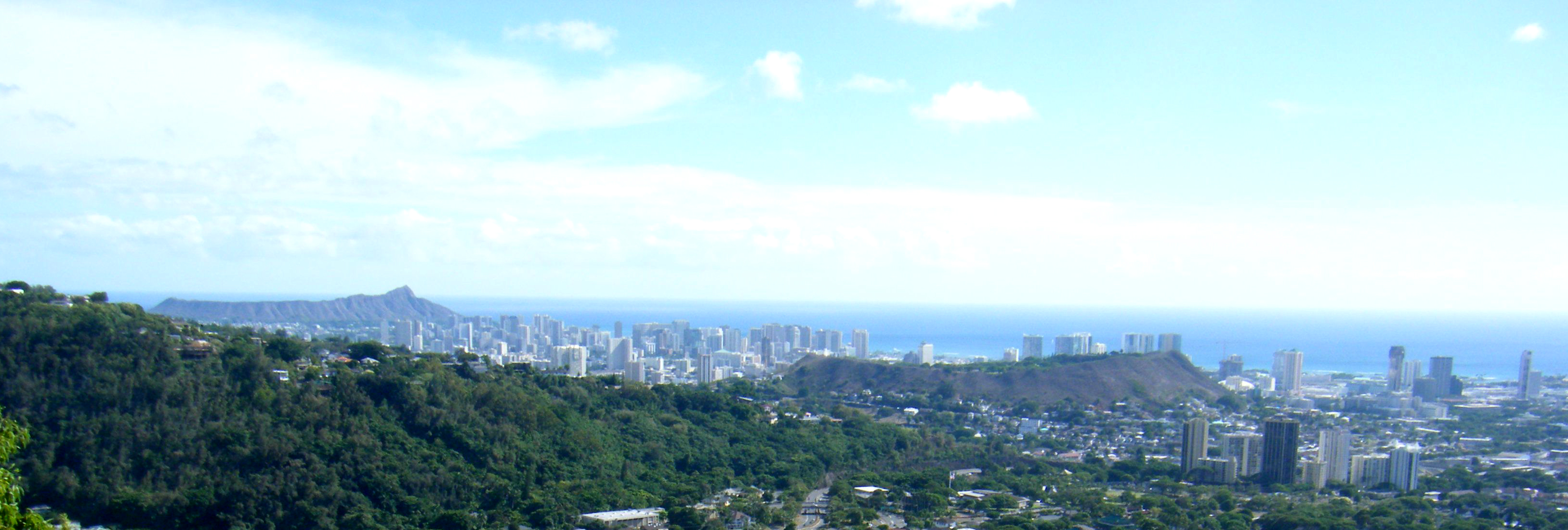
Diamond Head to the left, Punchbowl in the middle

=== Description of individual volcanoes ===
Most of the present-day shoreline of Hawaiʻi Kai was formed by Honolulu Volcanics; the Kuapā Pond is a leftover lake between the new shoreline and the old shoreline of the Koʻolau volcano. The volcanic vents there include Koko Head, the Hanauma Bay craters, Kahauloa crater bay, a wave-eroded cone, Koko Crater and Kalama cinder cone; Koko Head cones are heavily eroded, and the sea has broken into one of the cones, exposing its structure in outcrops. Koko Head is the largest cone of the Honolulu Volcanics and the crater of Koko Crater is about 1 kilometre (0.62 mi) wide. Hanauma Bay close to Kalanianaʻole Highway is located 13 kilometres (8.1 mi) east of Honolulu and is a 0.4 by 0.8 kilometres (0.25 mi × 0.50 mi) large, 18 metres (59 ft) deep compound crater/tuff cone with several associated dykes and lava flows- It was breached by the sea and coral reefs grow within it. Together with Kahauloa and Kalama all these vents form the Koko Rift. Farther northeast lie the Kaupō lava flow and the islands of Kāohikaipu and Mānana; all these except Mānana are also in the Koko Rift. This 15 kilometres (9.3 mi) long rift includes at least 12 separate volcanic vents and its vents appear to have formed in a single eruption.

Diamond Head is a 1,700-metre (5,600 ft) (rim-to-rim) wide typical tuff cone with a wide and not overly deep crater that forms a prominent promontory east of Honolulu. Inland from Diamond Head lie the Kaimukī and Mauʻumae cones, which appear to come from a shared fissure. Mauʻumae features a lava flow and Kaimukī is an unusual lava cone with a summit crater. Its slopes are gentle and lava ponded against topographical obstacles. The Kaimukī and Kaʻau cinder cones together with Mauʻumae and Diamond Head form the Kaʻau or Kaimukī rift zone; the Kaʻau crater lies close to the crest of the Koʻolau Range and is filled by a swamp that drains into Waimao stream. Punchbowl Crater rises north of and at the centre of Honolulu and is a good outlook to the city and its surroundings.

The Mokapu peninsula was formed by Honolulu Volcanics and includes the three volcanic vents of Puʻu Hawaiʻiloa, Pyramid Rock and Ulapaʻu Head; additional vents form islets off the peninsula, such as Moku Manu and Mōkōlea Rock. Puʻu Hawaiʻiloa is a cinder cone in the middle of the peninsula, Pyramid Rock at the northwestern tip is deeply eroded and probably the oldest vent in the peninsula, and Ulapaʻu Head is a crater that was breached by the sea and of which only a crescent-like western part remains.

Salt Lake Crater contains a salt lake and is located east from Pearl Harbor; the salt lake formed when salty groundwater seeped into the crater and was concentrated by evaporation. A cluster of additional older vents known as ʻĀliamanu, Makalapa, ʻĀliamanu School Cone, Moanalua Cone, ʻĀkulikuli Vent and Wiliki Cone are associated with Salt Lake Crater. The Salt Lake Tuff is associated with these craters and covers an area of at least 13 square kilometres (5 mi^{2}); Honolulu International Airport and Hickham Air Force Base lie south and southwest from the vents respectively. Some of these vents have been identified as maars.

== Geology ==
The Honolulu Volcanics developed on the 2.3-million-year-old Koʻolau Volcanic Series, which forms the core of eastern Oahu and extends underwater far from the shore. Like other Hawaiian volcanoes Koʻolau is a shield volcano that grew through lava flows erupted from a rift system with a central caldera, although a large section of the volcano has sunk below sea level. This volcano constitutes the tholeiitic stage of Hawaiian volcanism, and developed possibly during Miocene to Pleistocene time. Before Koʻolau volcano was active, between 3.5 and 2.74 million years ago, Waiʻanae volcano formed the western part of Oʻahu. Koʻolau volcano appears to be unrelated to the Honolulu Volcanics, which are considered to be a separate volcanic system; sometimes the "Kokohead Volcanics" are split off from the Honolulu Volcanics.

The Honolulu Volcanics constitute a late stage of volcanism which in Hawaiʻi is known as the rejuvenated stage and the third stage of a typical Hawaiian volcano. They have a much smaller volume than the Koʻolau volcano even though their lava flows are usually thicker; the unconformity that separates the Honolulu Volcanics from the Koʻolau Volcanic Series was already recognized in the 19th century.

As Hawaiian volcanoes grow, they start to sink under their weight. As volcanism moves along the Hawaiian chain, the Hawaiian Arch moves behind the volcanism at a distance of several hundred kilometres, and appears to have passed under Oahu in geologically recent times. The tectonic effect of the Hawaiian Arch passing under the island may be responsible for the onset of Honolulu Volcanics volcanism, as well as of the Kōloa Volcanics on Kauaʻi and perhaps for future volcanism on Maui or Molokaʻi, but also for ongoing uplift on Oʻahu. Other proposed mechanisms are a conductive heating of the lithosphere or ongoing upwelling in the mantle plume. There is evidence that a fall in sea level at the beginning of the last ice age triggered the last eruptions.

The terrain that the volcanoes developed on includes both old volcanic rocks of the Koʻolau volcano, sediments of the coastal plains, and soils. Some Honolulu Volcanics have grown on coral deposits, Koko Head developed on limestone for example, and coral reef development was widespread during the activity of the Honolulu Volcanics. The Honolulu Volcanics are not associated with either aeromagnetic or gravimetric anomalies; only Salt Lake Crater has an associated gravity anomaly. There is rejuvenated volcanism on Waiʻanae volcano also, but it appears to be older than the Honolulu Volcanics.

=== Composition ===
The petrology of the Honolulu Volcanics is well studied. The volcanic rocks of the Honolulu Volcanics are diverse; they include alkali basalts, melilite and nepheline basalts, basanites, melilite, nephelinite and websterite, and form an alkaline-nephelinite suite. The variations in composition reflect distinct proportions of melts produced from parent rocks. Phenocrysts include augite, labradorite, olivine and plagioclase; additionally spinels are found in the rocks. Xenoliths of amphibole, calcite, clinopyroxene, dunite, garnet, garnet peridotite, orthopyroxene, phlogopite, garnet pyroxenite, lherzolite and spinel have been described. The most common ones are dunite, garnet containing rocks and lherzolite and the relative prevalence of the various xenoliths is a function of the position of their source vent relative to the Koʻolau caldera. Their formation was influenced by mantle rocks left over from the Koʻolau volcano.

Coral fragments have been found in Koko and Salt Lake rocks, and metamorphic rocks included in the volcanics may be part of the basement that the magmas of the volcanoes traversed. Calcite – which in the form of crystals gives Diamond Head its name – in the volcanic rocks may come from coral reefs, groundwater or even from the magma itself; isotope ratios of the rocks indicate that groundwater carbonates are the most important source, however.

In Punchbowl Crater, where the rocks have been quarried, they have a brown to yellow colour. Cinders have red-black colours which can grade to yellow when they are hydrothermally altered, due to the formation of the glassy rock palagonite. Many of the erupted rocks have undergone various degrees of alteration, including the formation of zeolitic palagonite; minerals included in altered rocks include analcime, aragonite, calcite, chabazite, erionite, faujasite, gonnardite, gypsum, montmorillonite, natrolite, opal, phillipsite and thomsonite. In some vents, such as Diamond Head, the rocks are so heavily altered that their original composition and texture can no longer be reconstructed.

=== Origin of the rocks ===
The Honolulu Volcanics rocks originate at greater depths than the rocks from Koʻolau volcano and their composition is fairly dissimilar as well, while there are substantial geochemical similarities to young volcanic rocks from East Molokaʻi, Kauaʻi and West Maui. Jackson and Wright suggested that the pyroxenite may be the source rock of the magmas, with orthopyroxene-rich rocks being leftovers from the melting process; strontium isotope ratios endorse this origin although none of the xenoliths appears to be entirely representative of the source melts. Water- and carbon dioxide-containing volatiles may have altered the source rocks of the Honolulu Volcanics melts before these actually melted. In terms of the ultimate origin of the magmas, either an origin from a mixing between MORB mantle with mantle plume rocks, (Note: Sometimes described as "Kalihi component" which is found in all Koʻolau volcanic rocks) the lithosphere (Note: Either ancient one or 100 million years old as is the lithosphere beneath Hawaii) or exclusively from lithospheric mantle have been proposed. Research published in 2007 favoured an origin from a depleted mantle component along with a mantle plume "Kalihi" component, with additional material contributed from the margins of the mantle plume. Magma may have remained in the crust for months or years before erupting and originated at much greater depth than Haleakala or Kilauea magmas.

=== Groundwater content ===
Groundwater contained in Honolulu Volcanics rocks, while not voluminous, is important in some areas such as Maunawili Valley. Moreover, impermeable tuff layers can hold groundwater in rock layers above them. However, Koʻolau volcanic rocks contain most of the groundwater on Oʻahu, and most Honolulu Volcanics have little significance. Some groundwater in Honolulu Volcanics rocks is saline, and has been used both as a water source for a sea-life park at Makapuʻu and for the discharge of salty wastewaters.

== Eruption history ==
=== Chronology ===
The activity of the Honolulu Volcanics began less than one million years ago during the late Pleistocene and Holocene, after volcanic activity at Koʻolau had ceased and the volcano been substantially eroded. The first eruptions occurred within the Koʻolau caldera and the youngest in the far southeastern part of Oʻahu, coinciding with the Koko Rift. There is otherwise little evidence for a spatial pattern in the volcanic activity, with each rift having eruptions widely spaced in time. The lava flows from Honolulu Volcanics have been used to construct a history of variations of Earth's magnetic field.

Eruptions of the Honolulu Volcanics have been correlated to shorelines generated by sea level variations, which have left both drowned and emergent platforms and terraces on Oʻahu. Some volcanoes formed when sea level was lower than today and thus part of their structures are now submerged, others formed when it was higher and grew on reefs. These sea level variations are a function of glacial-interglacial changes, with higher sea levels associated with interglacials when polar glaciers expand and retreat. Thus four stages of volcanic activity have been defined, a first during the Kahipa highstand, a second during the Kaʻena and Lāʻie highstands, a third during the Waipiʻo and Waimānalo highstands and a fourth after the Waimānalo highstand. In turn, the Waimānalo stage was correlated to the last interglacial/Sangamonian interstadial and the Kaʻena highstand to an interglacial 600,000 ± 100,000 years ago.

First dating efforts yielded ages of Pleistocene-Holocene based on sea level variations, while potassium-argon dating has yielded ages ranging between 800,000 and 60,000 years old. However, the presence of excess radiogenic argon due to the xenoliths makes dates obtained by potassium-argon dating unreliable and dates older than 800,000 years are especially questionable. Argon-argon dating has been applied to submarine vents of the Honolulu Volcanics and has yielded ages of 700,000 to 400,000 years for submarine vents northeast of Oʻahu while the southwestern submarine vents have ages clustering around 140,000 ± 50,000 years, in line with the ages of the Koko rift.

Volcanic activity occurred in two pulses, one between 800,000 and 250,000 years ago and the other in the last 120,000 years, with a hiatus in between the two pulses. Sometimes the vents of the Sugar Loaf, Tantalus Peak and Koko Rift area are classified separately from the other vents of the Honolulu Volcanics as they are usually less than 100,000 years old. Volcanic eruptions in the Koko Rift occurred between 100,000 and 60,000 years ago; it is not clear whether Koko Rift or Tantalus Rift erupted last, as ages of 35,000 and 85,000 years before present have been obtained on the Koko Rift while the Tantalus Rift has yielded ages of 76,000 ± 1,000 years ago, and the two rifts are clearly unrelated to each other. The average recurrence interval for eruptions in the Honolulu Volcanics is about 35,000 years assuming that the younger ages for the Koko Rift are correct.

=== Eruption characteristics ===
Many eruptions were highly explosive, probably due to the magma being rich in gases, threw tephra high into the air, and ripped pre-existent volcanic rock and limestone out. When the rising magma intercepted water—especially close to the coast—steam explosions ensued which threw up rock debris including older rocks such as coral fragments. Lava flows were erupted mainly during the late stage of the eruption and were typically of small dimensions; the longest flow is 7 kilometres (4.3 mi) long and the largest one at Kaimukī forms a 4 square kilometres (1.5 sq mi) lava shield or lava dome. Cinder cones form from the fallout of volcanic ejecta material, which is variously described as cinder, lava bombs, pumice and spatter and forms layered deposits. Tuff cones in addition can also contain non-magmatic ejecta. Many of these eruptions, especially that of Diamond Head, probably only lasted for a short time such as a few hours, as has been observed in similar eruptions during historical time.

The field has also seen many Surtseyan or phreatomagmatic eruptions, especially at nearshore vents, when ascending magma encountered water, such as at Mānana Island, Koko and Punchbowl; these eruptions were explosive and they are the best exposed site of Surtseyan activity in the United States. Some formed small islands when they emerged, and one vent may now be buried beneath coral deposits. At Koko Crater and Diamond Head, the amount of water interacting with the developing volcano varied over the course of the eruption, as more water entered the vent when the eruption enlarged it.

Volcanic rocks of Honolulu Volcanics include agglomerates, breccia, breccia-tuffs, scoria bombs and tuffs. Tephra takes the form of both lapilli and volcanic ash and some eruptions were followed by lahars when volcanic ash was swept up by streams; one such deposit is found in Pālolo Valley. During eruptions, trade winds blew material from the vent; this wind-driven material transport is responsible for the frequently asymmetric shape of the volcanoes such as at Diamond Head where the southeastern rim is the highest part of the crater rim.

Drill cores in Hanauma Bay have found ash layers; a black ash known as "black sand" is widespread across Honolulu and originated in volcanic eruptions of the Honolulu Volcanics, and ash layers cover coral reef deposis both onshore and offshore as far as ʻEwa Beach. Ash from the Salt Lake Craters was transported by winds to Pearl Harbor and is considered to be responsible for the formation of the bay by closing off its access to the sea.

Activity at specific vents:

- At Diamond Head, eruptions commenced underwater and first deposited white rocks formed mostly by reworked corals. Proper tuff layers were emplaced on top of this unit.
- The formation of Kaʻau Crater was also accompanied by phreatic activity that deposited alluvial tuffs. Some eruptions – such as those of the Kaʻau, Mōkōlea and Training School vents – may have occurred as one sequence over a 13 kilometres (8.1 mi) long line.
- Intense explosive eruptions took place when magma erupted underwater, forming Hanauma Bay. The eruption took place in several stages; pauses between these stages lasted no more than a few months, and erosion was already underway during the eruption. Hanauma Bay was colonized by coral reefs after it formed, and marine benches developed within the bay; the exact origin of these benches is often not clear. The eruption of Kahauloa was synchronous to that of Hanauma Bay.
- Koko Head was formed by the Koko Tuff. Later explosion craters, such as Hanauma Bay, developed within Koko Head. Koko Crater was also the source of an ash layer that covers the surrounding terrain, and of pyroclastic density flows. After Koko Head had formed, a second volcanic explosion generated another crater on its eastern foot and filled gullies which had been carved into Koko Head by erosion.
- Punchbowl Crater formed from the fallout of an eruption column. Material from the column fell onto the coral plain where the vent was located, forming the crater.
- The formation of the Sugarloaf flow was accompanied by tephra fallout. The tephra reached over 1 metre (3 ft 3 in) thickness 6 kilometres (3.7 mi) away in what is now downtown Honolulu, landing on a limestone 123,000 ± 2,000 years old. The flow was erupted on a ridge, west from the Manoa Valley. It is a 15 metres (49 ft) thick ʻaʻā flow, an unusual trait given its composition which resembles that of Nyiragongo volcano which produces fast flowing lava flows. The eruption of the Tantalus vent was apparently synchronous to that of Sugarloaf; both eruptions were highly explosive due to a high volatile content of the magmas, shedding ash over a large area.
- Ulupaʻu Head crater contained a lake, which was once the largest lake of Hawaiʻi with a surface area of 0.5–0.6 square kilometres (0.19–0.23 sq mi). It persisted for a long time during the Middle Pleistocene until the sea breached the crater rim. A number of bird fossils have been found in the lake deposits. Rano Kau on Easter Island resembles the former Ulupaʻu Head lake.

Many vents of the Honolulu Volcanics are furrowed; erosion has cut gullies in the slopes of Diamond Head and Punchbowl Crater. Wavecut terraces formed in some volcanoes during sea level highstands; it is likely that wave erosion breached Hanauma Bay, flooding it, either during or after the eruption that created it.

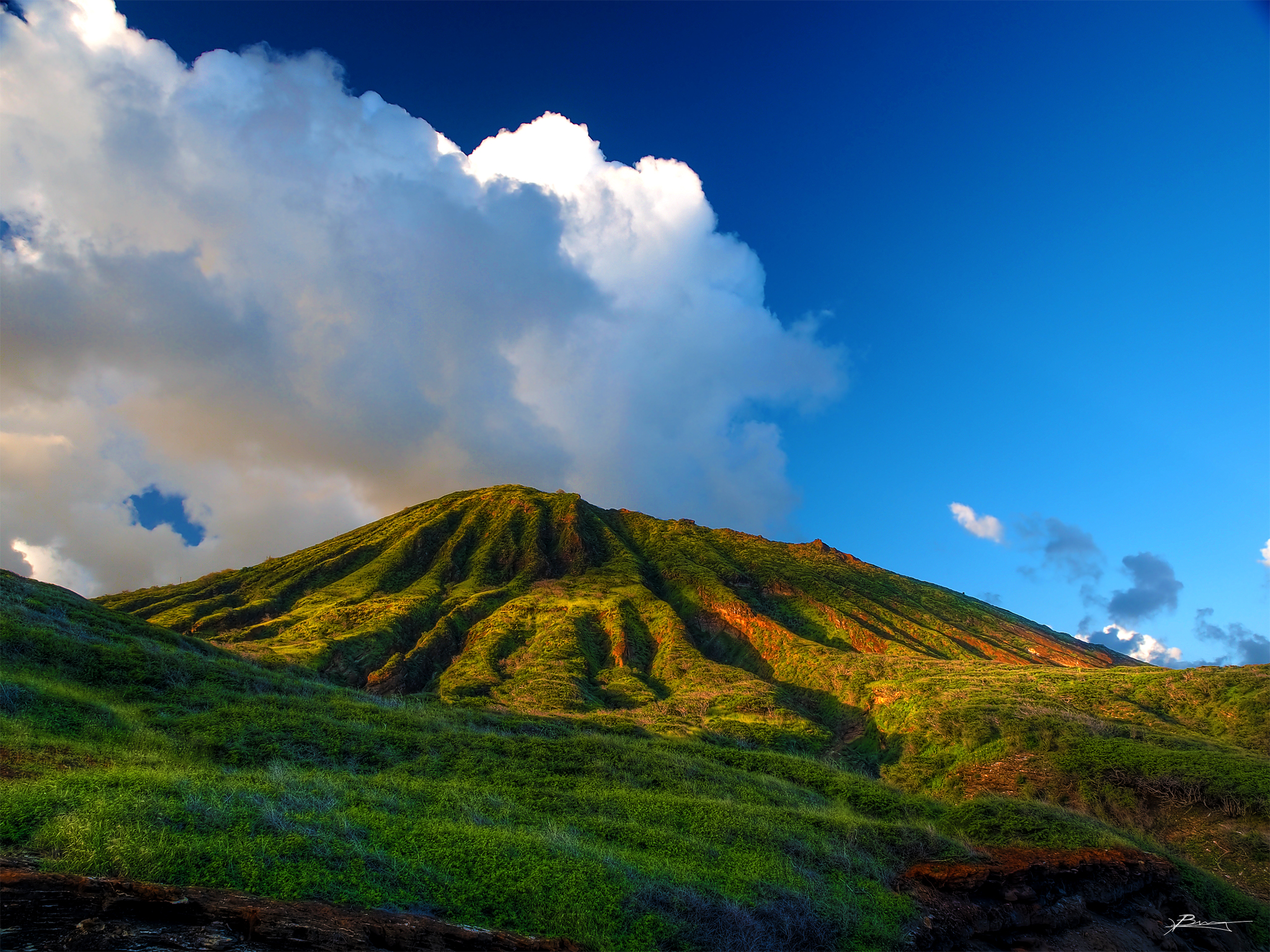
Erosion gullies on the flanks of Koko Crater

== Youngest activity and hazards ==
The youngest eruptions of the whole field took place either 30,000 or 76,000 years ago, making it the youngest rejuvenated volcanism in Hawaii. Some of the youngest volcanics of Honolulu Volcanics were once considered 5,000 years old, with an age of 7,000 years attributed to a volcanic event at Hanauma Bay and another of 10,000 years to the Kaupō flow. However, radiometric dating has not yielded ages younger than 31,000–43,000 years old, and most age estimates of less than 30,000 years ago are misinterpreted. There is no evidence in oral tradition for eruptions during historical times.

Future eruptions of Honolulu Volcanics are possible, but the likelihood of a new event in the next hundred or thousand years is considered to be so small as to be negligible; it is probably comparable to the Kohala peninsula on Hawaiʻi, the lowest risk area of the active island. Additionally, only small areas of Oʻahu are likely to be affected by an eruption.

Any future eruption is likely to occur in the southeastern sector of Oʻahu and will be of small volume, involving the emplacement of cinders, lava flows and mudflows with characteristics similar to those of past Honolulu Volcanics eruptions:

- Tephra fall would be drawn by winds in a most likely southwestward direction, and could depending on the vent location fall over downtown Honolulu and Pearl Harbor; known dangers of tephra falls are collapsing roofs, pollution of the air and of water resources, impaired visibility and damage to machinery and vegetation. Close to the vent volcanic gases and falling lava bombs would constitute additional dangers. Tephra deposits can be swept away by rainfall, forming mudflows which owing to their high speed and density can be hazardous.
- Steam explosions could generate lateral blasts, which can spread to distances of 8 kilometres (5.0 mi) from vents at high speed and transport dangerous heat and debris. Such lateral blasts may have occurred when Diamond Head, Koko Head and Punchbowl formed.
- Lava flows can cause severe property damage as they can destroy structures in their way, but owing to their slowness are seldom a threat to life; additionally a lava flow would most likely be preceded by other eruptive phenomena which would drive people away from the hazard zone before a lava flow can become a threat.

== Geothermal power prospecting ==
The Mokapu Peninsula has been prospected for the presence of geothermal power resources, but the presence of such resources was judged to be unlikely. Short-lasting volcanism typical for Honolulu Volcanics is unlikely to leave remnant heat resources. The only anomalously warm springs in the area are found within the Koʻolau caldera and are related to that volcanic system rather than the Honolulu Volcanics. Some evidence of geothermal activity has been found elsewhere on Oʻahu.

== List of vents ==
Name	Age in years before present	Photo	Traits of the vent; most vents include a cone and lava flows	Location	Coordinates per Ozawa, Tagami and Garcia 2005
ʻAinoni	440,000 ± 30,000			This vent lies 2 miles (3.2 km) southwest of Olomana Peak	21°21′14″N 157°45′40″W
ʻĀkulikuli	290,000 ± 70,000				21°21′03″N 157°55′00″W
Āliamanu Crater	250,000 ± 40,000		Maar	This vent is located between Pearl Harbor and Honolulu, directly northwest from Salt Lake Crater	21°21′43″N 157°54′32″W
Black Point	400,000–330,000, older age estimates are 290,000 and 410,000 by potassium-argon dating as well as 300,000 and 480,000 Apparently two eruptions occurred here		Cone and lava flow just south of Diamond Head.	Southeast of Diamond Head	21°15′34.5″N 157°47′47″W
Castle	410,000 ± 50,000, older age estimates are > 800,000 years old or 850,000 by potassium-argon dating		Lava flow at the foot of the Nuanuʻu cliffs.	4.8 kilometres (3 mi) east of Kailua	21°24′00″N 157°46′09″W
Diamond Head	520,000–350,000 or 360,000 ± 70,000			Southeast of Honolulu	21.2638033°N 157.8089652°WGoogle Maps for Diamond Head State Monument
Haʻikū	800,000 ± 80,000		The Haʻikū volcanics are found on the crest of the Koʻolau Range. A Haʻikū lava flow is found at Heʻeia Stream at 15 metres (50 ft) elevation.	At the head of the valley of the same name	21°25′51″N 157°48′27″W
Hanauma Bay	70,000 ± 30,000, ot 68,000 ± 5,000 if identical with "Toilet Bowl"		Tuff cone	East of Honolulu close to Koko Head peninsula	21°16′24″N 157°41′34″W
Kaʻau	580,000 ± 120,000, older age estimate is 650,000 by potassium-argon dating			At the head of the Pālolo valley	21°19′40″N 157°46′39″W
Kahauloa	70,000 ± 30,000		Tuff cone	East of Honolulu just southwest from Koko Head.	21.2797414°N 157.7041887°WFrom Google Maps
Kaimukī	380,000 ± 110,000, older age estimate is 280,000 by potassium-argon dating		Lava cone or lava dome	In Kaimukī, Honolulu on the northern flank of Diamond Head	21°17′08″N 157°48′32″W
Kalama	71,000 ± 6,000, older age estimates are 34,000, 30,000 by potassium-argon dating and another is 80,000 ± 50,000		Lava flow with a cinder cone; with a volume of 0.11 cubic kilometres (0.026 cu mi) the Kalama lava flow is the largest of the Honolulu Volcanics.	Northeast of Koko Head	21°17′37″N 157°40′01″W
Kalihi	460,000 ± 70,000, older age estimates are 460,000–580,000 by potassium-argon dating		Kalihi volcanics on the crest of the Koʻolau Range, which consist of cinder cones and lava flows. A Kalihi lava flow is found in Honolulu at 12 metres (40 ft).	At the head of the valley of the same name	21°20′33″N 157°52′39″W
Kamanaiki	590,000 ± 20,000		Lava flows	In the Kamanaiki valley	21°21′36″N 157°50′26″W
Kāneʻohe	500,000 ± 90,000, older age estimate is 700,000 by potassium-argon dating			2 miles (3.2 km) south of the place of the same name	21°23′51″N 157°47′46″W
Kāohikaipu	63,000 ± 14,000		Cone that forms an island	Northeast of Makapuʻu Point, the easternmost tip of Oʻahu	21.320340069547882°N 157.6563609211429°WTaken from Google Maps
Kaupō	68,500 ± 5,000, older age estimates are 320,000 and 30,000 by potassium-argon dating as well as 32,000		Spatter cone and lava flow		21°18′56″N 157°39′52″W
Koko Crater	100,000 ± 30,000, older age estimate is 40,000 by potassium-argon dating for the Koko Crater Group		Tuff cone	East of Honolulu	21°16′45″N 157°41′18″W
Luakaha	470,000 ± 30,000, older age estimates are 360,000 and 420,000 by potassium-argon dating		Together with Makuku forms the Nuanuʻu group	At the head of the Nuanuʻu valley	21°19′30″N 157°51′34″W
Makalapa	470,000 ± 60,000		Maar or crater just east from Pearl Harbor, which drops off steeply from about 30 metres (100 ft) to the shore.	Northwest from Honolulu and directly east from Pearl Harbor (at grounds of United States Pacific Fleet headquarters)	21°21′50″N 157°55′54″W
Makawao				Olomana Peak lies 2 miles (3.2 km) northeast	
Makuku	400,000 ± 30,000		Together with Luakaha forms the Nuanuʻu group	At the head of the Nuanuʻu valley	21°20′32″N 157°50′55″W
Mānana			Tuff cone, also known as Rabbit Island, in Waimānalo Bay.	Northwest of Makapuʻu Point, the easternmost tip of Oʻahu. It appears to be formed by two cones, with one crater still preserved.	21.328873289004072°N 157.6570605741068°WTaken from Google Maps
Mānoa	200,000–70,000				21°18′37″N 157°48′56″W
Maunawili	790,000–780,000		Cinder cone and lava flow	South of Olomana Peak	21°21′14″N 157°45′40″W
Mauʻumae	480,000 ± 40,000, older age estimate is 430,000 by potassium-argon dating			In Kaimukī, Honolulu	21°17′20″N 157°48′05″W
Mōʻiliʻili	90,000 ± 90,000 and more recently 76,000; an older estimate is 67,000				21°17′54.5″N 157°49′07″W
Mōkōlea	580,000 ± 90,000		Also known as Mokapu South or Mokulea	In Kailua Bay	21°26′04″N 157°43′22″W
Moku Manu	700,000 ± 80,000		An island.	North of Mokapu Point	21°28′22″N 157°43′28″W
Pali	640,000–600,000			At the Pali road close to the crest of the Koʻolau Range	21°22′27″N 157°47′29″W
Pali Kilo	400,000 ± 40,000			On Mokapu peninsula	21°27′35″N 157°46′16″W
Punchbowl Crater	430,000–390,000, older age estimates are 300,000 and 530,000 by potassium-argon dating			At the centre of Honolulu	21°18′57.5″N 157°51′05″W
Puʻu Hawaiʻiloa	450,000–420,000		Located on Mokapu peninsula, it is a symmetric cinder cone with associated lava flows.	On Mokapu peninsula	21°27′28″N 157°45′42″W
Puʻu Kakea / Round Top / Sugar Loaf	76,000 ± 1,000 by argon-argon dating, another estimate for the group is 70,000 by potassium-argon dating		Tuff Cone, cinder cone with ash and lava. The vents that generated the flow are also known as Round Top and Puʻu Kakea	On the divide between Pauoa and Mānoa valleys	21.315362108192296°N 157.8163454550223°WTaken from Google Maps
Pyramid Rock	680,000 ± 100,000, older age estimate is 710,000 by potassium-argon dating		Located on Mokapu Peninsula, close to Puʻu Hawaiʻiloa.	On Mokapu peninsula	21°27′56″N 157°46′00″W
Rocky Hill	60,000–40,000 or 60,000 ± 70,000		Located close to Punahou School, the vent consists of one main cinder cone and subsidiary vents and lava flows.	At Punahou Street	21°18′20″N 157°49′17″W
Salt Lake	430,000		Tuff Cone	Northwest from Honolulu	21.35957814997149°N 157.91320580927862°WTaken from Google Maps
Tantalus	110,000–80,000		Tuff Cone	On the divide between Pauoa and Mānoa valleys	21°20′21.5″N 157°48′50″W
Training School	580,000 ± 100,000		Lava flow accompanied by a mudflow	North of Olomana Peak	21°23′29″N 157°44′57″W
Ulupaʻu Head	600,000–400,000		Ulupaʻu cone is located on Mokapu peninsula, and forms its tip and its highest point.	The tip of Mokapu peninsula	21.454556728663615°N 157.72796037142552°WTaken from Google Maps
