= Koko Crater =

Volcanic crater in Hawaii

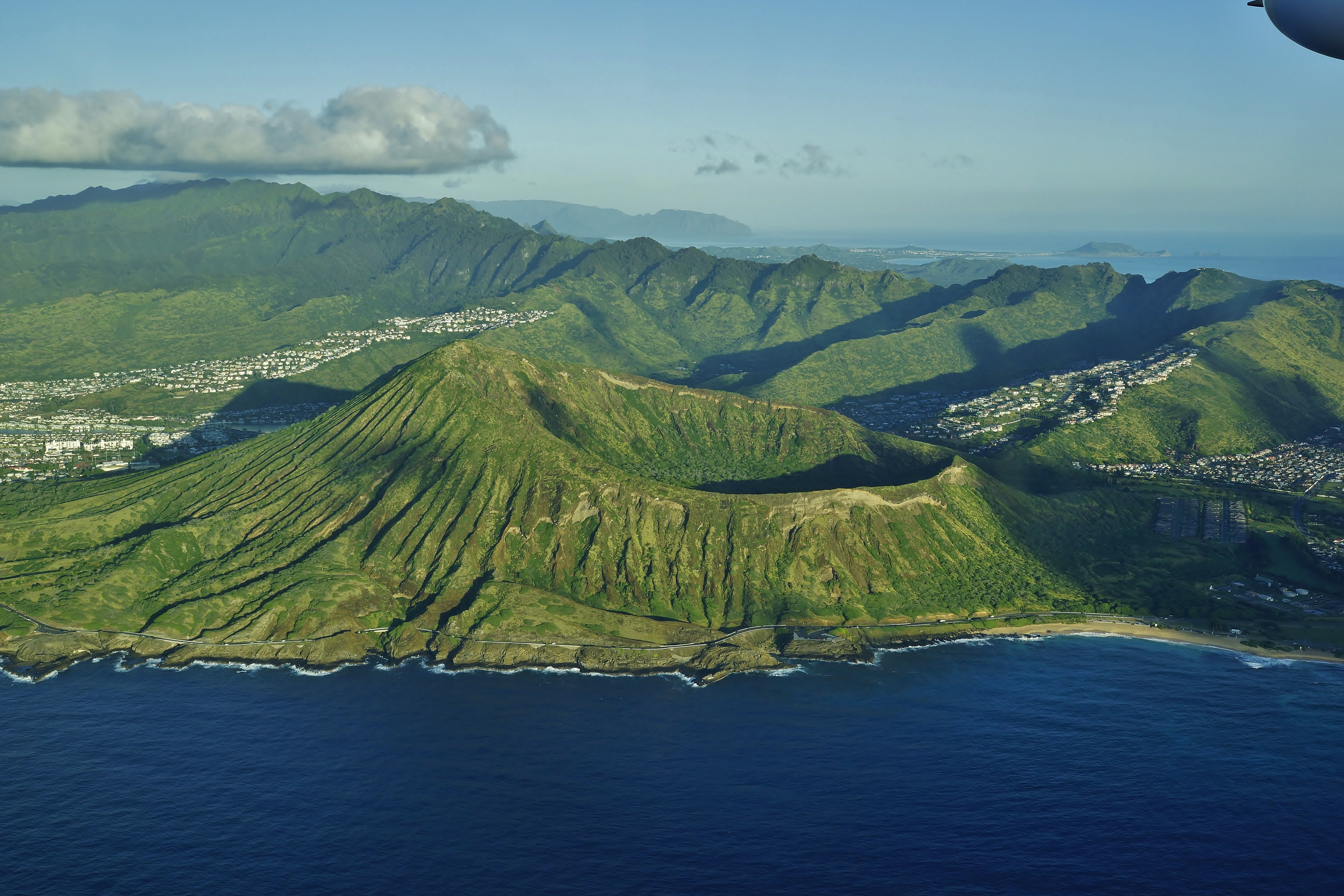
- Koko Crater with the Koʻolau Range in the background

Highest point
- Elevation: 1,208 ft (368 m)
- Coordinates: 21°17′10″N 157°40′53″W

Geography
- Location within Hawaii
- Location: Honolulu County, Hawaii, United States

Geology
- Mountain type: Tuff cone
- Volcanic arc: Hawaiian–Emperor seamount chain

Koko Crater (Hawaiian: Kohelepelepe or Puʻu Mai) is an extinct tuff cone located on the Hawaiian island of Oʻahu near Hawaiʻi Kai. It is northeast of Hanauma Bay and south of the Koʻolau Range.

== Geology ==
Koko Crater is a part of the Honolulu Volcanics, which were craters that formed as vents of the Koʻolau Volcano during its rejuvenation stage. Other notable landmarks within the Honolulu Volcanics include nearby Hanauma Bay and the well-known Diamond Head crater.

Koko Crater, Hanauma Bay, and other nearby tuff cones form the Koko Rift Zone, which marks the latest episode of volcanic activity on the island of Oahu. Radiocarbon dating suggests that the latest eruption within the Koko Rift Zone occurred 7,000 years ago; however, the validity of these results is disputed. Its elevation is 1,208 ft (368 m), making it the tallest and most preserved tuff cone in the area.

== Trail ==
During World War II, the US military built bunkers on top of Koko Crater with a railroad leading to its summit. In 1966, the US Air Force ceded administration of Koko Crater to the city of Honolulu. It was then renamed to the Koko Head Regional Park. Within this park is the Koko Crater Trail, which is a 0.42-mile-long trail (0.68 km) that uses the abandoned railroad as its pathway. The Kokonut Koalition is a nonprofit that has a city contract to maintain the trail.

== Mythology ==
Its original Hawaiian name was Kohelepelepe – Hawaiian for vagina labia minor. The legend tells a story where Pele, goddess of vulcanoes and fire, was attacked on Hawaii by Kamapuaʻa, a shapeshifting man with a pig head. Her sister Kapo came to her aid, luring the attacker away by throwing her vagina to Oʻahu. Kamapua'a followed it to the location of Koko head, where it left a deep imprint, believed to be Koko crater.

== See also ==
- Honolulu Volcanics
- Koko Head
