= Kāohikaipu =

Islet in Hawaii, United States

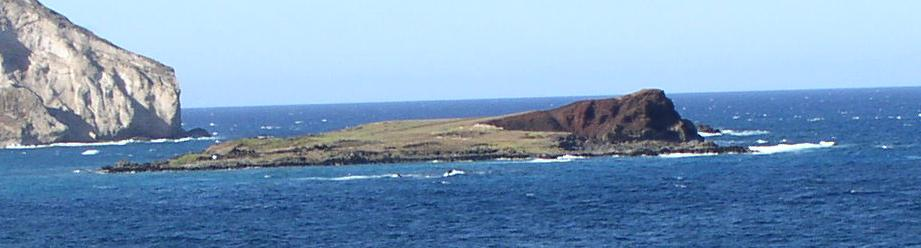
- Kāohikaipu as seen from Oahu, some of Mānana Island can be seen on the left

Highest point
- Elevation: 10 m (33 ft)
- Prominence: 10 m (33 ft)
- Coordinates: 21°19′13″N 157°39′23″W

Geography
- Location within Oahu Location within Hawaii
- Location: Hawaii, United States

Geology
- Mountain type: Tuff cone
- Last eruption: Unknown

Kāohikaipu (also known as Black Rock) is an islet located in Honolulu County, Hawaii, off the east coast of Oahu. It is situated 0.6 miles (0.52 nmi; 0.97 km) from nearby Mānana Island (Rabbit Island). Both Kāohikaipu and Mānana Island are northeast of Makapuʻu Point. The total size of Kāohikaipu is 11 acres (4.5 ha).

Kāohikaipu′s formation was due to the Honolulu Volcanic Series, which were a series of eruptions by the Koʻolau Range that created numerous vents near Honolulu such as Diamond Head.

The islet is a wildlife sanctuary for birds and a permit is needed for people to access it.

== See also ==
- Mānana (Rabbit Island)
- Honolulu Volcanics
- Makapuʻu
