= Kaʻau Crater =

Extinct volcanic crater in Hawaii, United States

- Location within Hawaii

Highest point
- Elevation: 1,516 ft (462 m)
- Coordinates: 21°19′43″N 157°46′21″W

Geography
- Location: Honolulu County, Hawaii

Geology
- Mountain type: Tuff cone
- Last eruption: Unknown

Kaʻau Crater is an extinct volcanic crater located on the island of Oahu in the U.S. state of Hawaii near Palolo Valley.

== Geology ==
Kaʻau Crater formed as a result of the Honolulu Volcanic Series, which were a set of eruptions from the Koʻolau Range. The HVS also created other tuff cones throughout Oahu such as Diamond Head.

== Legends ==
According to Hawaiian legend, the crater was formed when the demigod Maui tried pulling the islands of Oahu and Kauai together with a hook and line. Maui failed to do so due to the line snapping. The hook landed somewhere and created an indent, forming Kaʻau Crater.

The word "Kaʻau" comes from "Kaʻauhelemoa", which was the name of a supernatural chicken that lived in the same valley.

== Hike ==
The Kaʻau Crater Hike receives visitors every year. However, due to its hidden appearance, its popularity is overshadowed by other tuff cones in Honolulu. Due to Ka'au Crater location, visitors must receive permission from the landowners nearby to access it. Additionally, it can be dangerous to hike this crater after any sort of rain or heavy winds.

== See also ==
- Honolulu Volcanics
- Koʻolau Range
- Cinder cone
