= Koko Head =

Headland in Hawaii, United States

Coordinates: 21.261585°N 157.702949°W

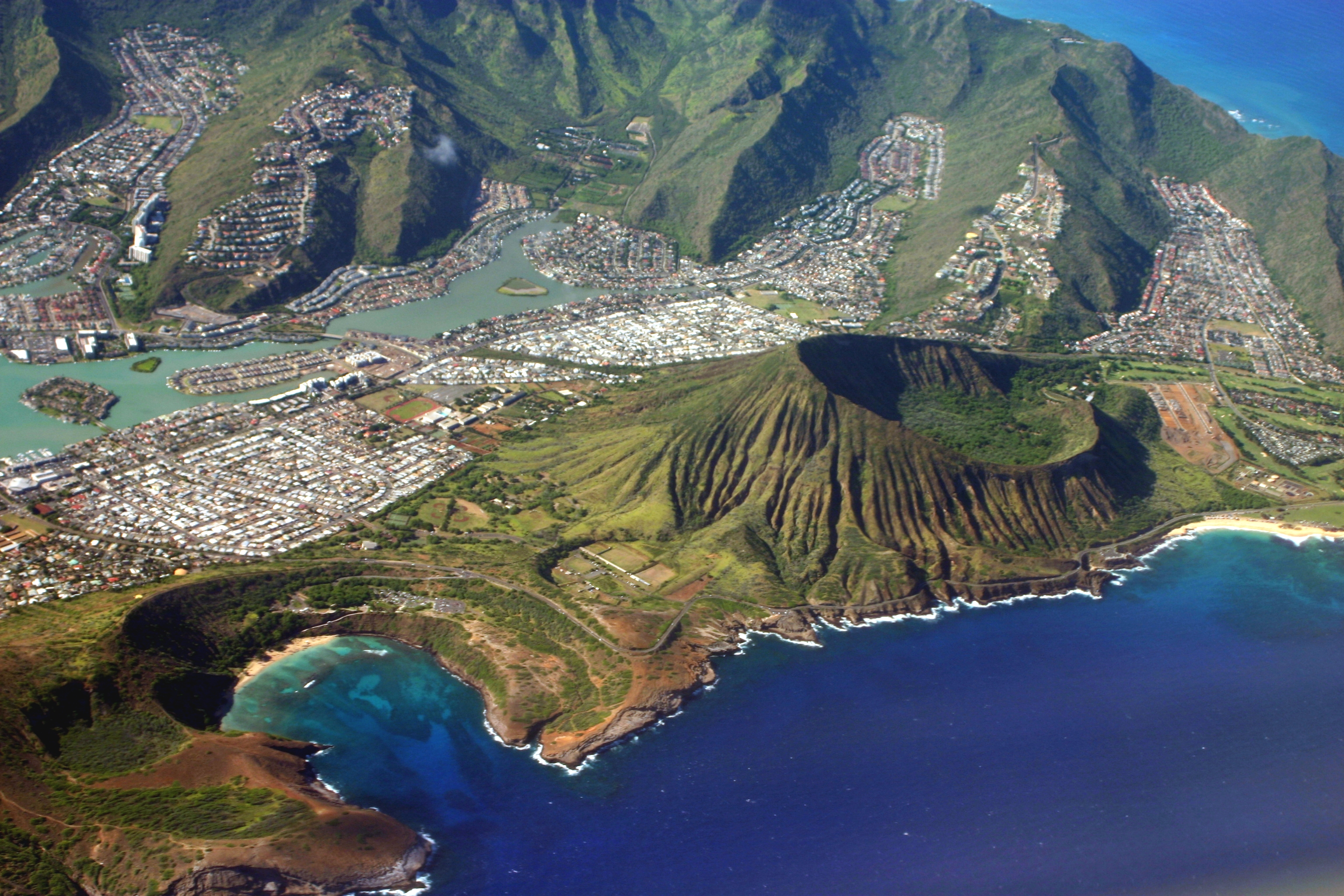
Hanauma Bay, Koko Crater and Hawaii Kai

Koko Head is the headland that defines the eastern side of Maunalua Bay along the southeastern side of the Island of Oahu in Hawaii. On its western slope is the community of Portlock, a part of Hawaiʻi Kai. Koko Head (at 642 ft or 196 m) is an ancient tuff cone that is somewhat dwarfed by its neighboring tuff cone, Koko Crater, with its peak, Kohelepelepe (or Puʻu Mai), rising to 1208 ft or 368 m. Koko Head itself has three significant depressions or old vents, the largest of which forms the well-known Hanauma Bay. Koko Head's last eruption was 3,000-5,000 years ago and it is part of the Honolulu Volcanics.

A strenuous 1.6-mile (2.6 km) rail trail leads hikers to the summit.

This eastern end of Oʻahu is quite scenic and most of the area is part of Koko Head Regional Park, administered by the City & County of Honolulu. The following features and natural areas are found between Koko Head and the eastern end of the island at Makapuʻu:

- Koko Crater is a large tuff cone that visually dominates the area. Within the crater are horse stables and the Koko Crater Botanical Garden specializing in cacti and succulents.
- Hanauma Bay is a tuff ring breached by the ocean.
- Lānaʻi Lookout is a scenic lookout that features a very distant view of the Island of Lānaʻi to the southeast of Oʻahu. Molokaʻi, directly across the Ka'iwi Channel, is closer and nearly always visible during the day; Lānaʻi is visible only under good atmospheric conditions, although if visible from anywhere on Oʻahu, it will be visible from this pull-out/parking area. The cremated ashes of Barack Obama's mother and maternal grandmother were scattered here in 1995 and 2008.
- Hālona Blowhole is a blowhole in the rocky shore. A large pull-out/parking area is present. The adjacent Hālona Cove is best known as the site of the love scene between Burt Lancaster and Deborah Kerr in the movie From Here to Eternity.
- Sandy Beach is a popular beach for surfing and a park popular for kite flying because trade winds (offshore here) are strong and steady most days. Sea conditions off the beach tend to be rough most of the time and the bottom drops away relatively quickly, so this is not a beach for relaxed swimming, but very popular for more extreme water sports and watchers.
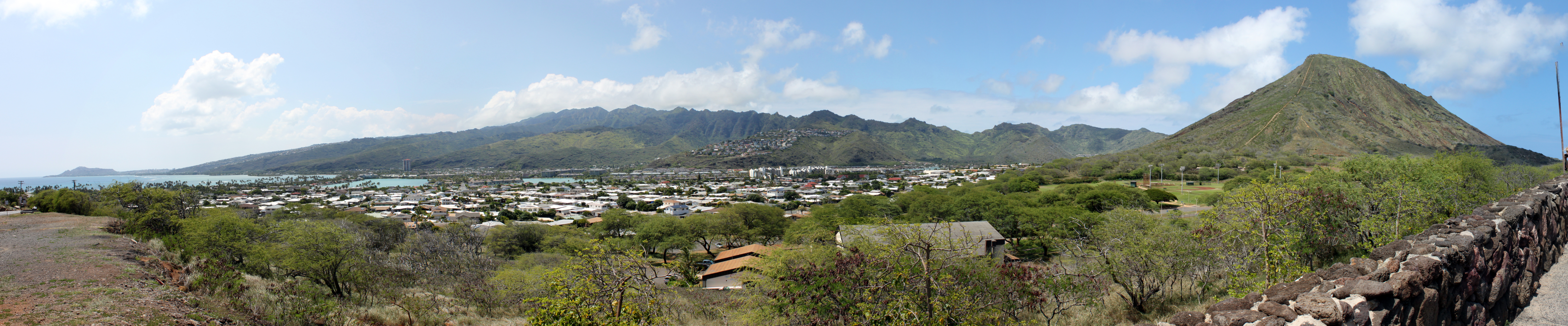
Panoramic view of Hawai'i Kai and Koko Crater

== Gallery ==
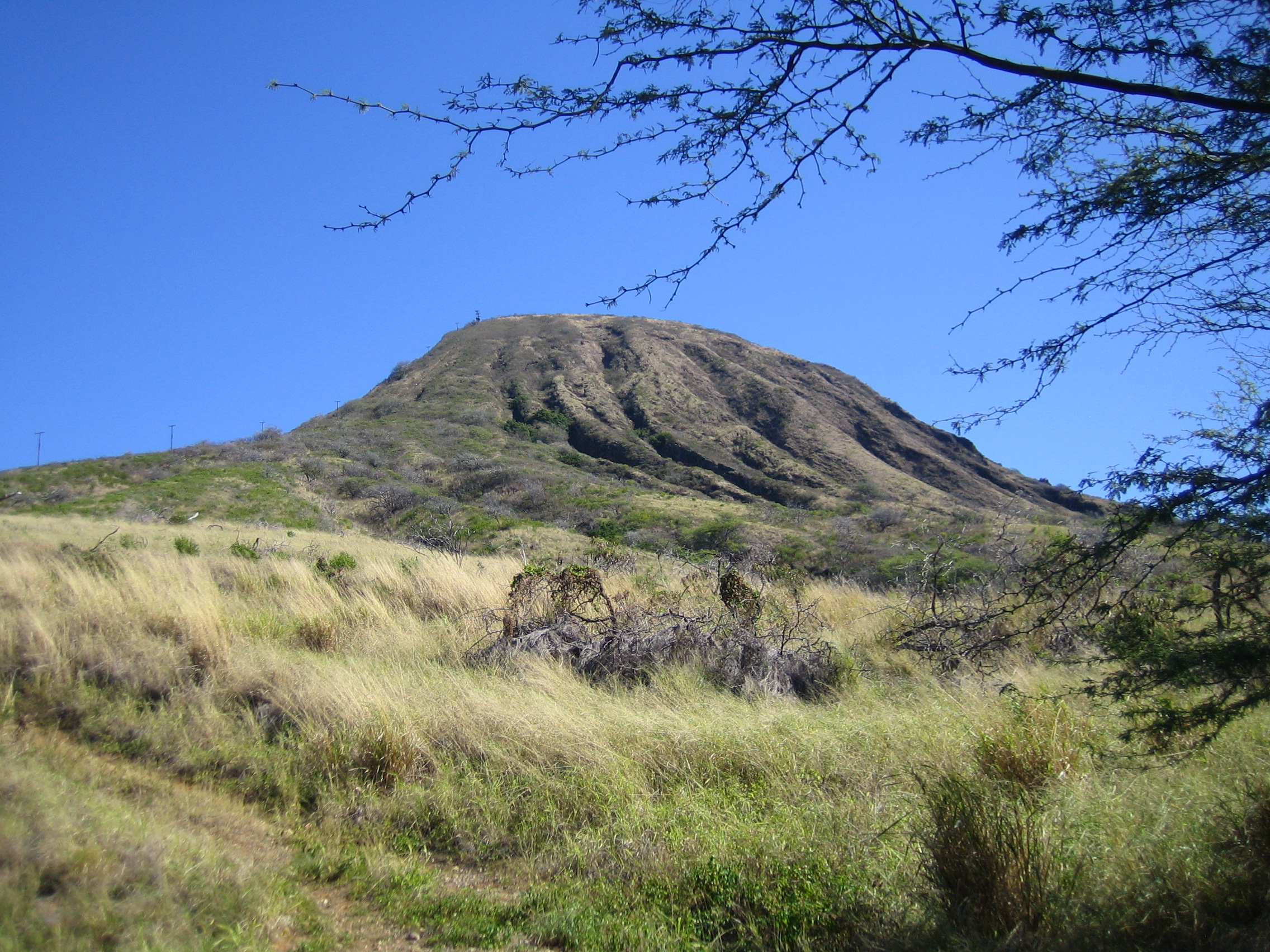
Koko Crater from the base of the old railway trail

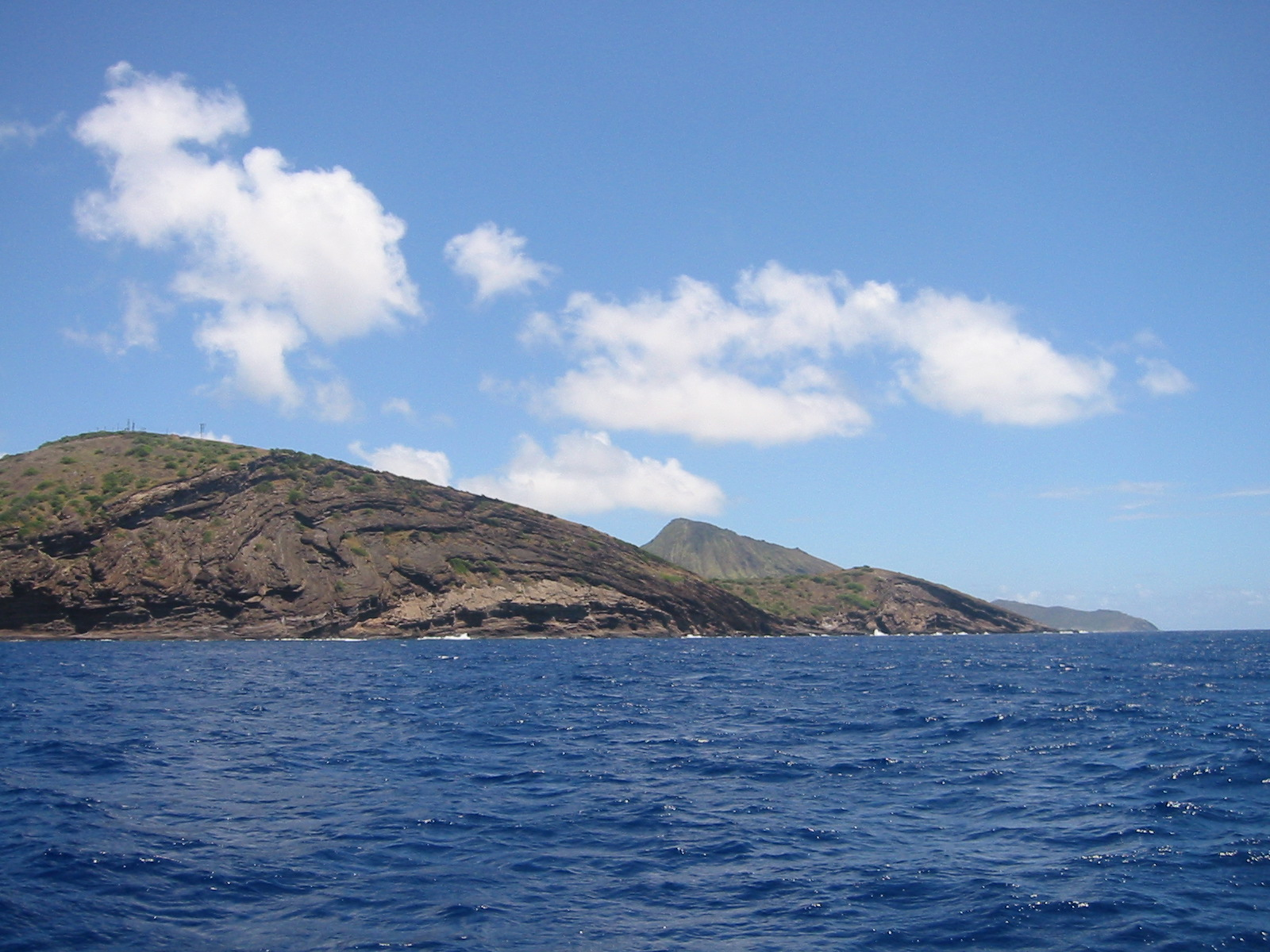
Koko Crater as seen from a boat, with Koko Crater and Makapu'u point

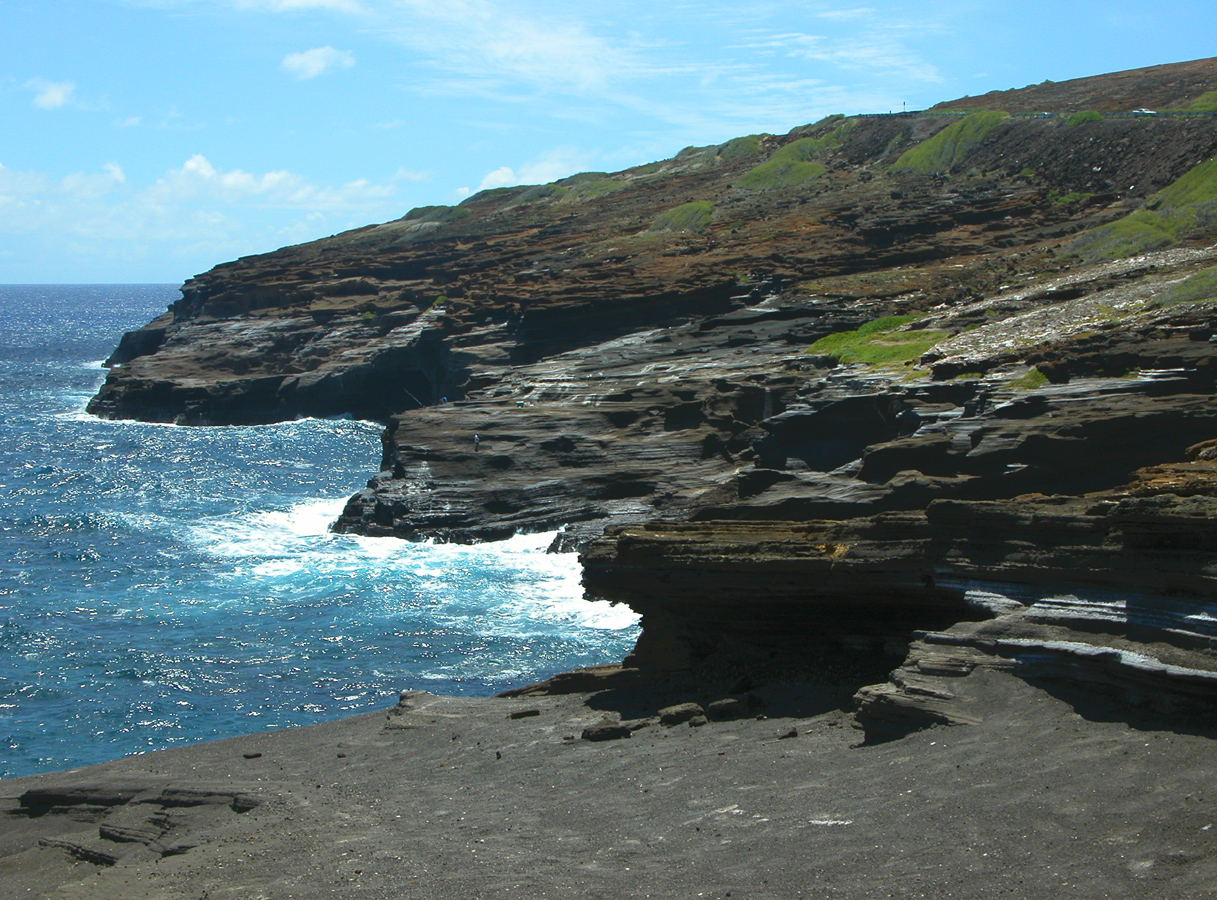
The coastline, looking northwest, from Lanaʻi Lookout

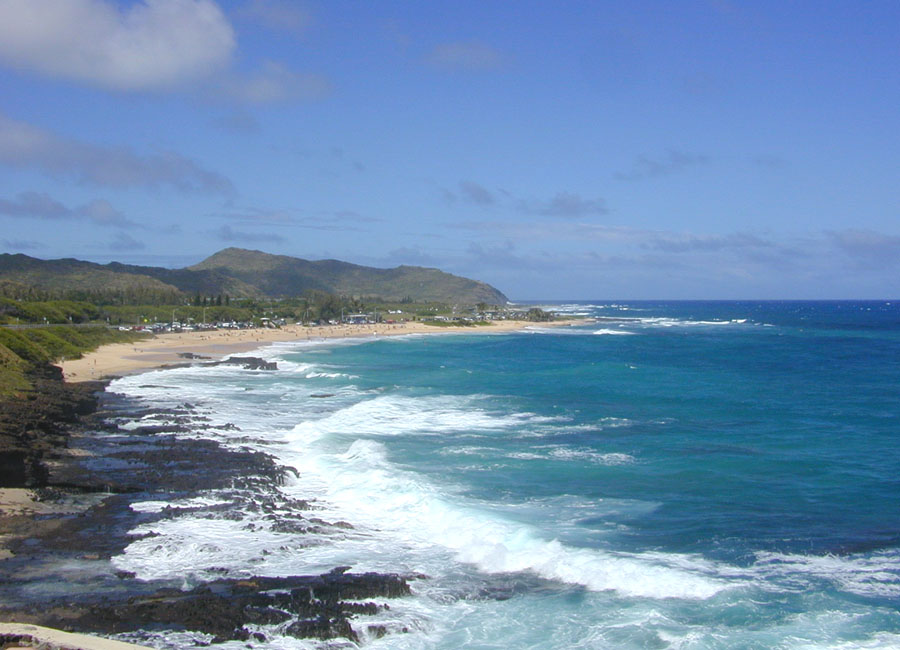
Sandy Beach from the Hālona Blowhole lookout. The far distant ridge is Makapuʻu Head, the eastern end of Oʻahu

Koko Stairs hike up the side of Koko Crater

Koko Crater South Rim with Hawaiʻi Kai in background

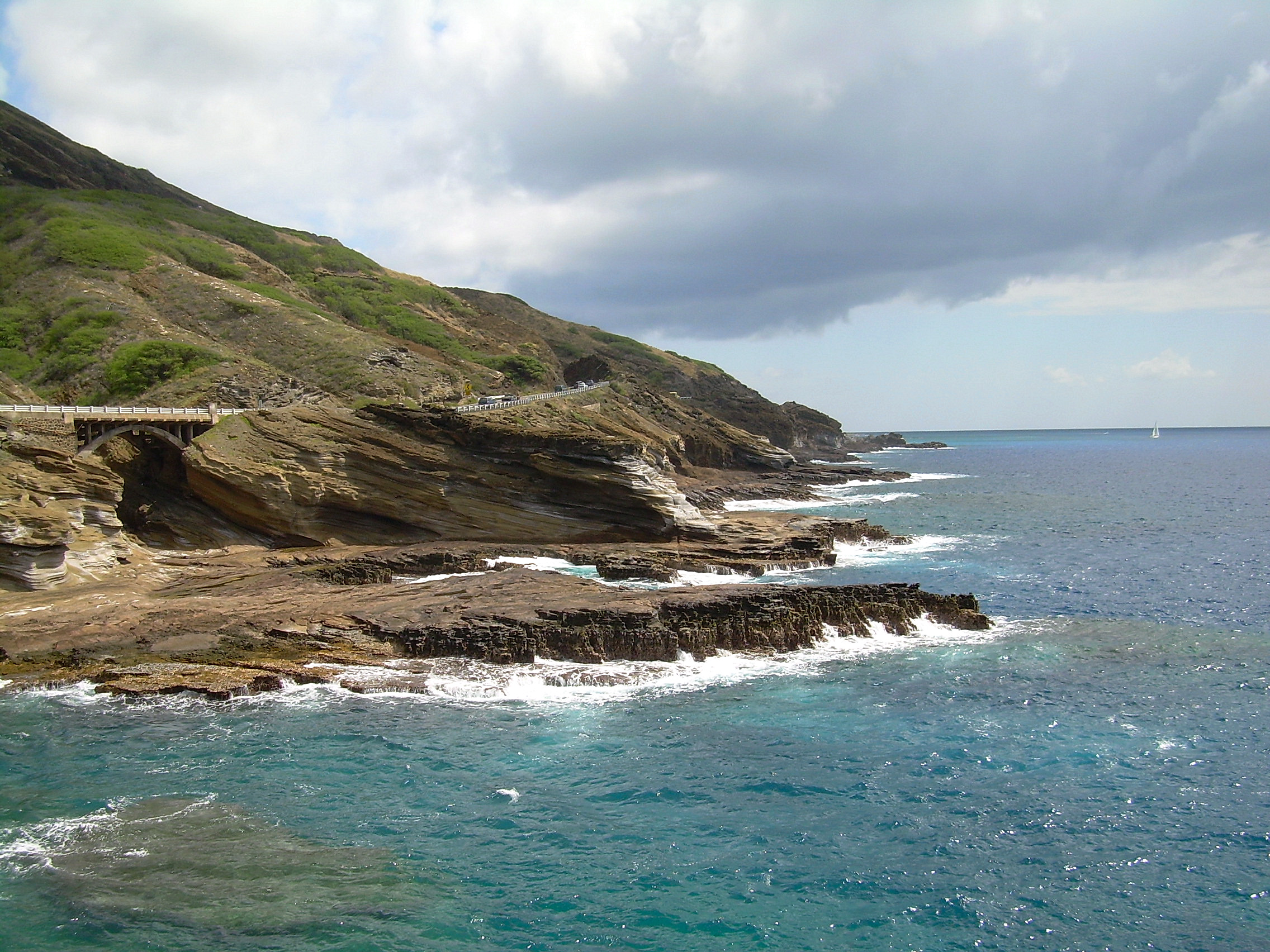
The coastline, looking southeast, from Lanaʻi Lookout

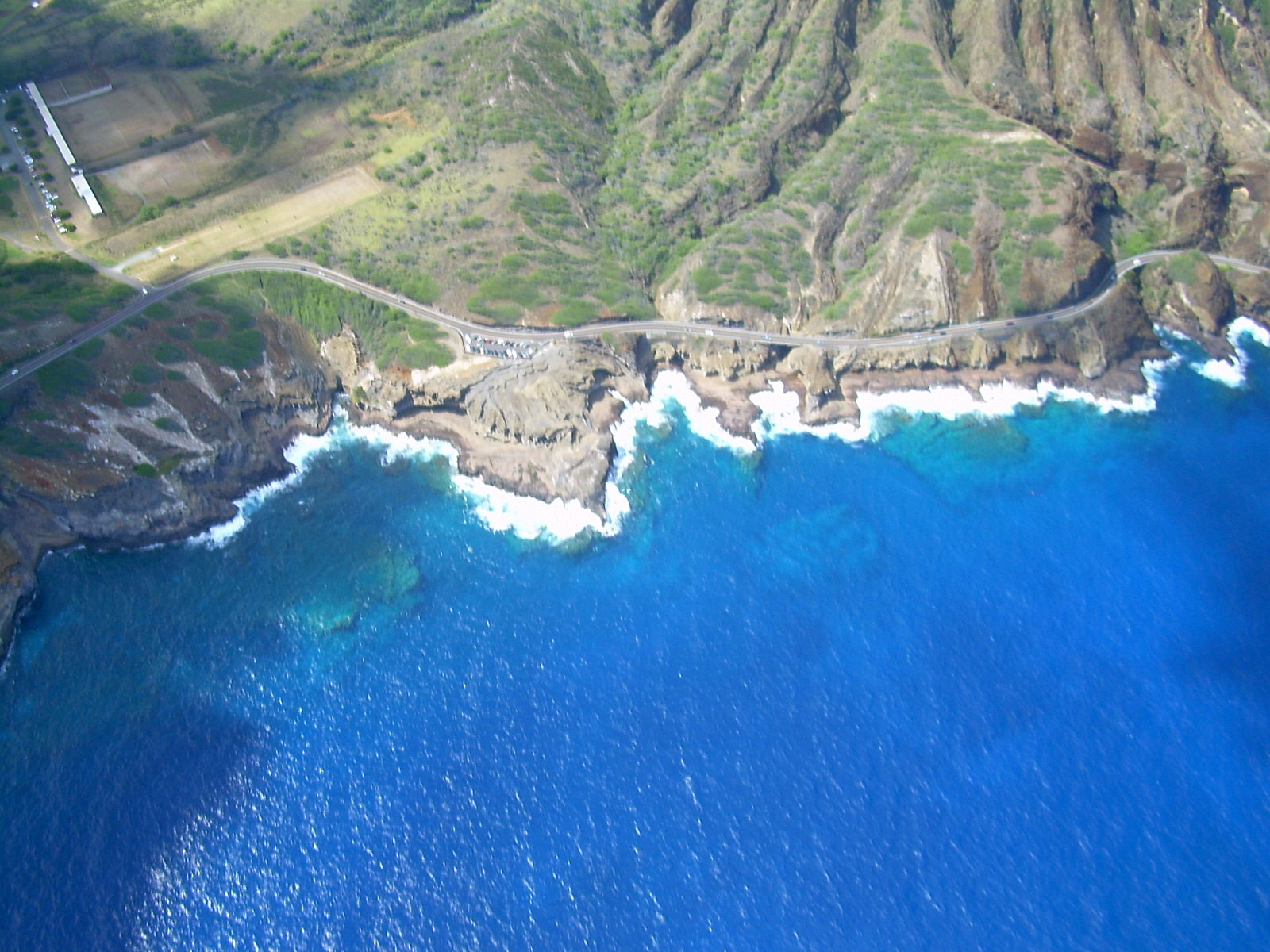
Aerial view of Lanaʻi Lookout, below Koko Crater

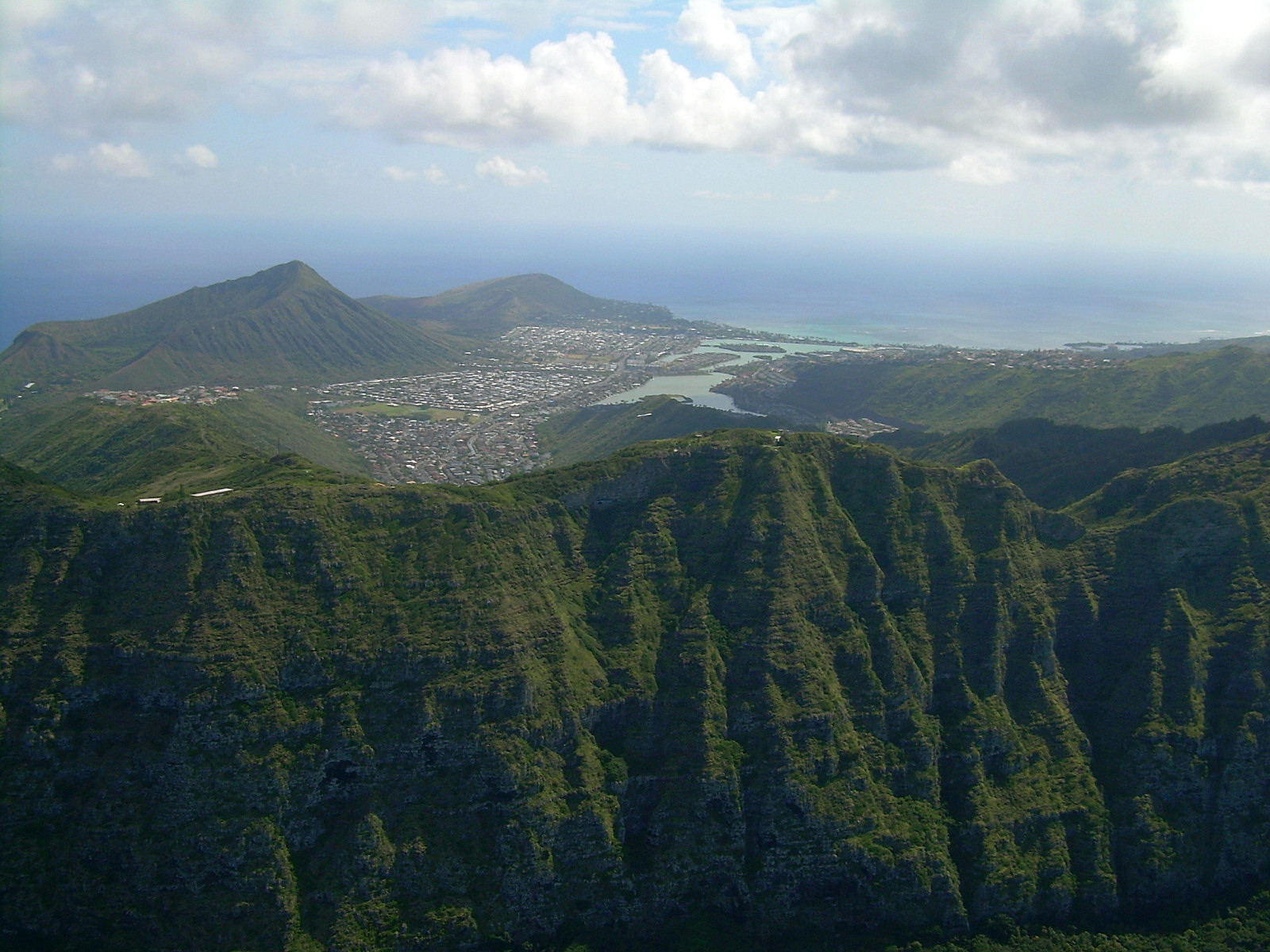
View of Koko Crater (far left) over the Koʻolau Range.

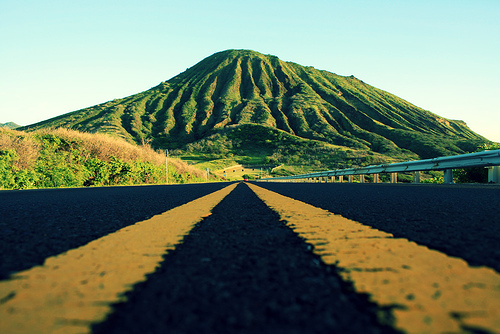
View of Koko Crater from the Kalanianaole Hwy

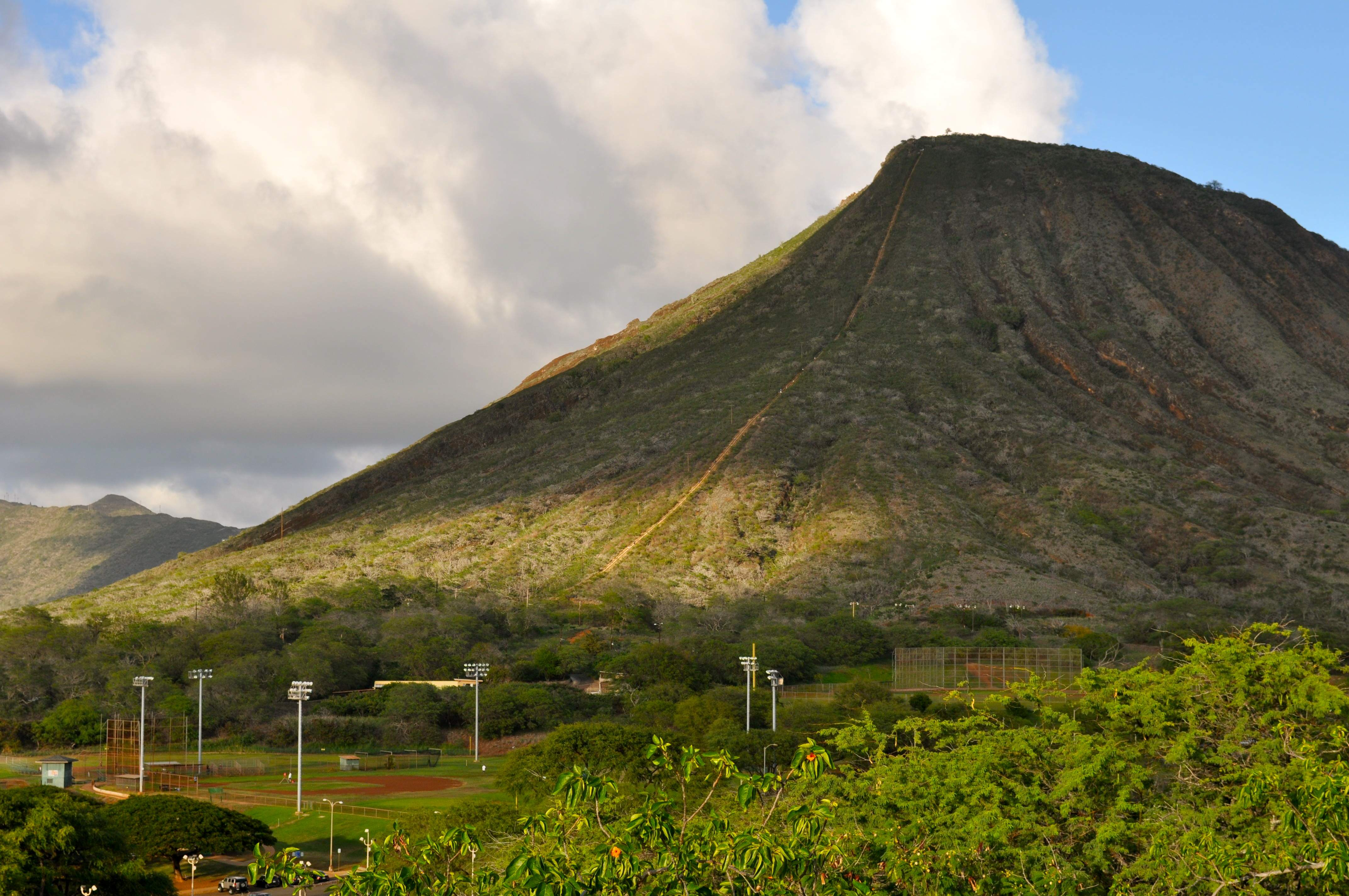
View of Koko Crater from the Kalanianaole Hwy, stairs visible ascending the slope.

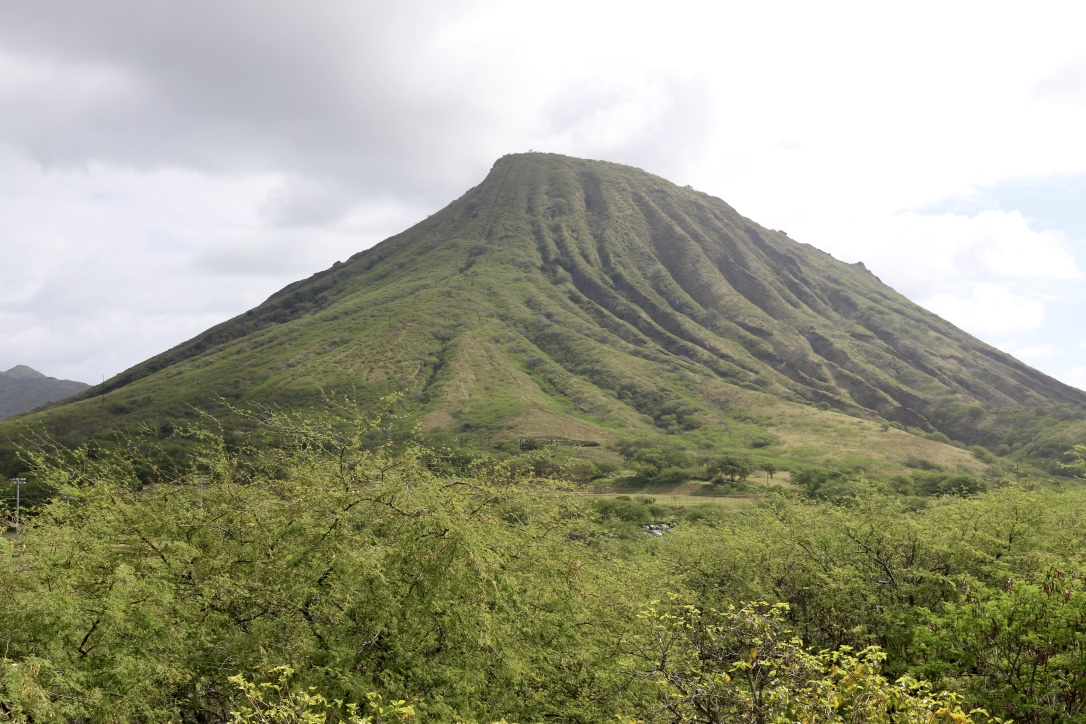
A view of Koko Crater from the lookout point nearby.

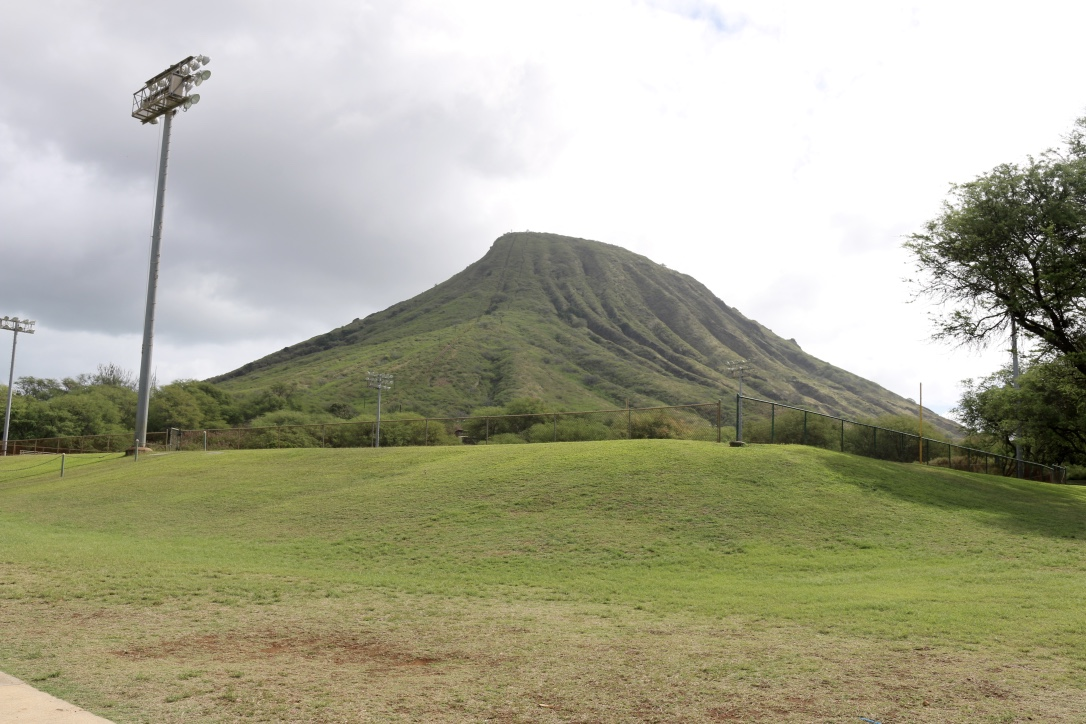
A view of Koko Crater from the park at the base of the mountain.
