= Mānana =

Islet in Hawaii, United States

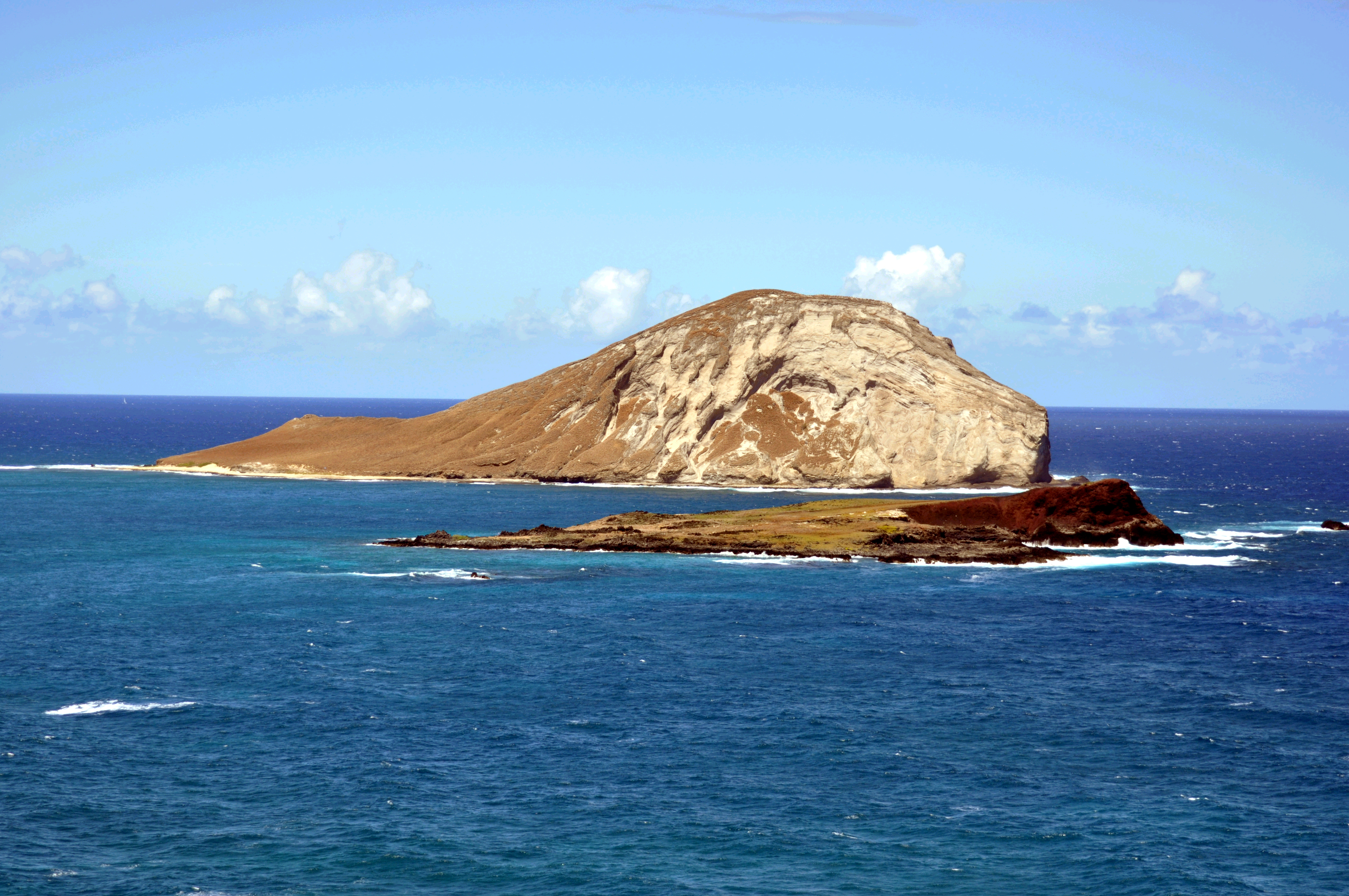
- Mānana Island (and Kāohikaipu) as seen from Oahu

Highest point
- Elevation: 110 m (360 ft)
- Prominence: 110 m (360 ft)
- Coordinates: 21°19′52″N 157°39′32″W

Geography
- Location within Hawaii
- Location: East of Oʻahu, Honolulu County, Hawaiʻi

Geology
- Mountain type: Tuff cone
- Last eruption: Less than 100,000 years ago

Mānana Island is an uninhabited islet located 0.75 mi (0.65 nmi; 1.21 km) off Kaupō Beach, near Makapuʻu at the eastern end of the island of Oʻahu in the Hawaiian Islands. In the Hawaiian language, mānana means "buoyant". The islet is commonly referred to as Rabbit Island, because its shape as seen from the nearby Oʻahu shore looks something like a rabbit's head and because it was once inhabited by introduced rabbits. The rabbit colony was established by John Adams Cummins in the 1880s when he ran the nearby Waimānalo plantation. The rabbits were eradicated about a hundred years later because they were destroying the native ecosystem, an important seabird breeding area.

Mānana is a tuff cone with two vents or craters. The highest point on the islet rises to 361 ft (110 m). The island is 2,319 ft (707 m) long and 2,147 ft (654 m) wide and has an area of about 63 acres (25 ha). Mānana's only sand beach is a small storm beach on the west to south-west (leeward) side of the islet. This sand deposit, located above the reach of the normal waves, is about 30 ft (9.1 m) wide and curves around to the western side of the island. Another volcanic islet named Kāohikaipu sits right next to Mānana.

Manana was formed by the Honolulu Volcanic Series. These series of eruptions were responsible for creating other tuff cones such as Punchbowl Crater.

Mānana is a State Seabird Sanctuary—home to over 10,000 wedge-tailed shearwaters, 80,000 sooty terns, 20,000 brown noddies, 5–10 Bulwer's petrels, and 10–15 red-tailed tropicbirds, and numerous Hawaiian monk seals. It is illegal to land on the islet without permission from the Hawaiʻi Department of Land and Natural Resources.
