= Hanauma Bay =

Marine embayment in Hawaii Kai, Oʻahu, Hawaii, US

Coordinates: 21°16′17″N 157°41′40″W

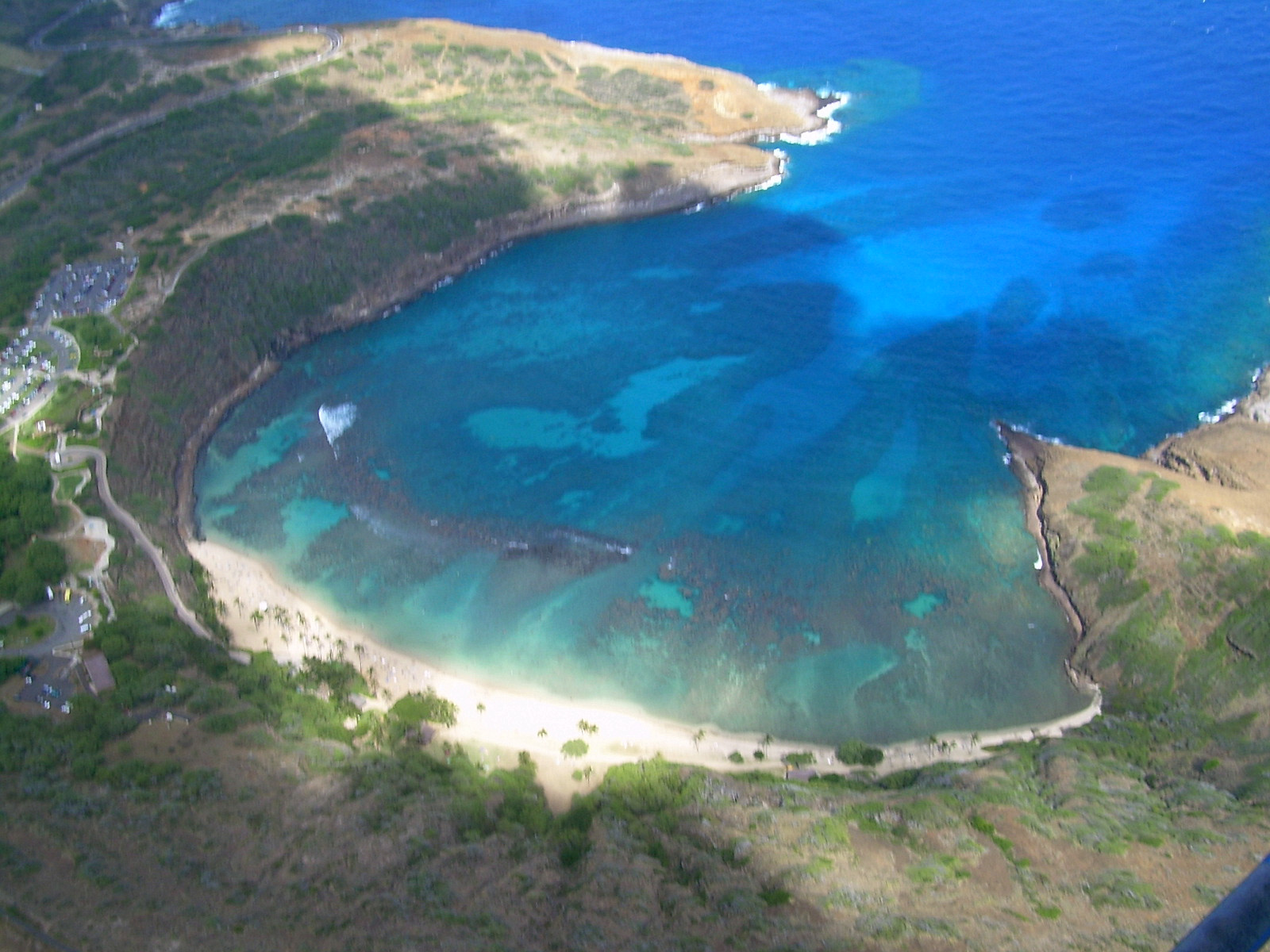
Aerial view of Hanauma Bay in April 2007

Hanauma (/ˌhɑːnəˈuːmə/; Hawaiian: [həˈnɐwmə]) is a marine embayment formed within a tuff ring and located along the southeast coast of the Island of Oʻahu in the Hawaii Kai neighborhood of East Honolulu, in the Hawaiian Islands.

Hanauma is one of the most popular tourist destinations on the Island and has suffered somewhat from overtourism. At one time, this popular tourist destination accommodated over three million visitors per year. In 1956, dynamite was used to clear portions of the reef to make room for telephone cables linking Hawaii to the west coast of the United States.

== Name ==
The prefix hana means bay in the Hawaiian language; therefore, the name is uma bay. There are two etymological interpretations of the second part of its name. One interpretation derives it from the Hawaiian word for curve, referring to either the shape of the feature or to the shape of the indigenous canoes that were launched there. Another stems from the indigenous hand-wrestling game known as "Uma".

== Marine life ==
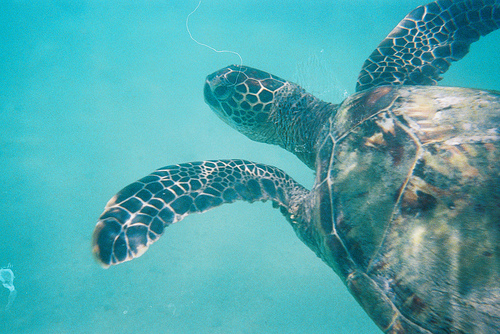
A turtle at Hanauma Bay

Hanauma is both a Nature Preserve and a Marine Life Conservation District (the first of several established in the State of Hawaiʻi). Reflecting changes in attitude, its name has changed over time from Hanauma Bay Beach Park to Hanauma Bay Nature Preserve. Visitors are required by law to refrain from mistreating marine animals or from touching, walking, or otherwise having contact with coral heads, which appear much like large rocks on the ocean floor (here, mostly seaward of the shallow fringing reef off the beach). It is always recommended to avoid contacting coral or marine rocks as cuts to the skin can result and neglecting such wounds may bring medical problems.

About 400 species of fish are known to inhabit the bay. Hanauma Bay is known for its abundance of Green sea turtles, Chelonia mydas, known as Honu. Hanauma is a nursery ground for the immature turtles, which have their nesting grounds at French Frigate Shoals. It is also known for its abundance of parrotfish.

Coral bleaching due to sediment in the water column has affected the coral reefs in Hanauma. In 2014 and 2015, 47% of the corals at Hanauma Bay Nature Preserve suffered from coral bleaching, close to 10% of the corals in the nature preserve died.

== Geology ==
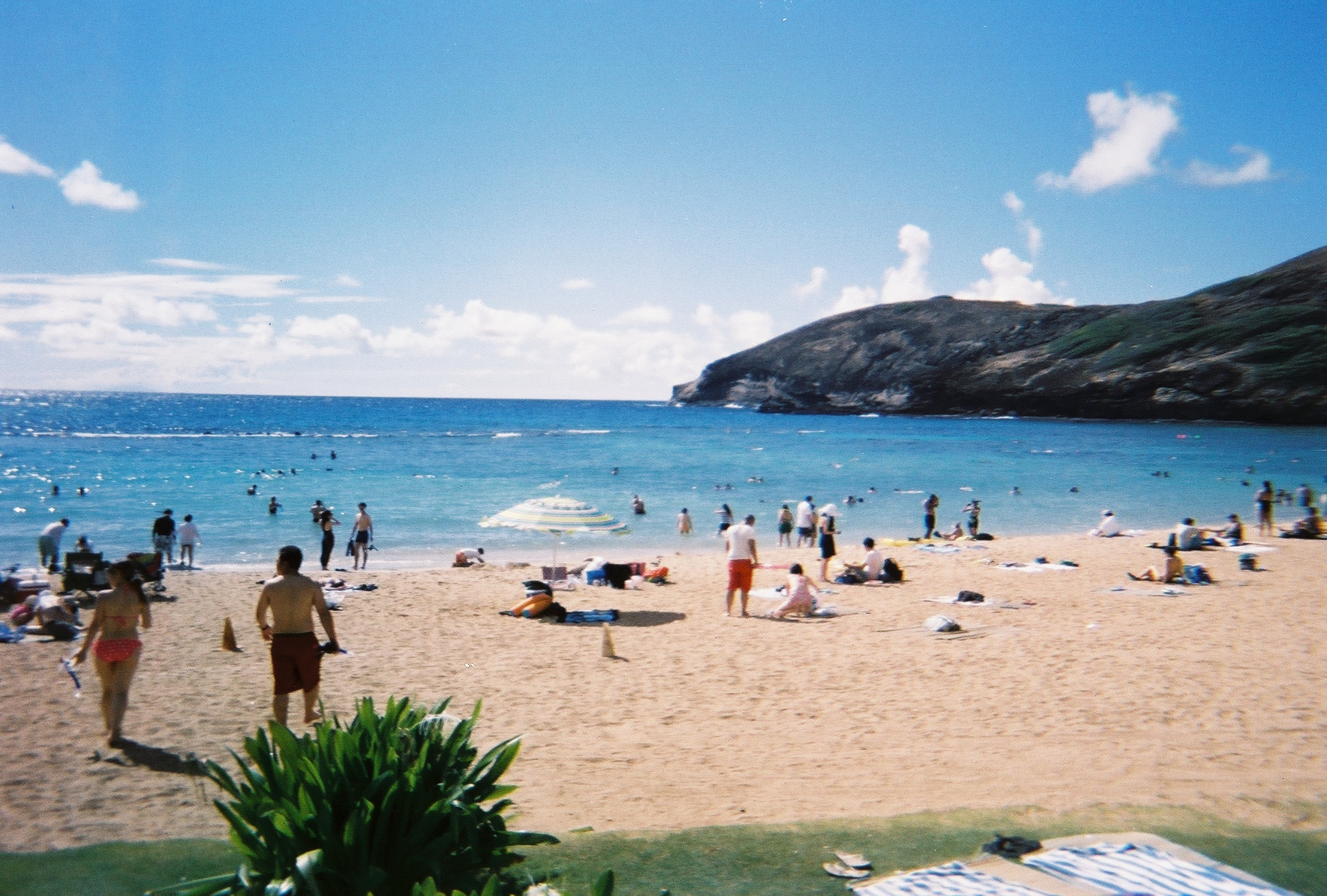
Hanauma Bay Beach area

The Hawaiian Islands are a group of volcanoes that have risen up over a hot spot, which is a section of the Earth's surface that has exhibited volcanism for an extended period of time. Volcanic chains such as the Hawaiian Islands form as a result of the movement of a tectonic plate across fixed hot spot beneath the surface. In the case of the Hawaiian Islands, the Pacific plate has moved slowly northwestward over such a hotspot.

Approximately 3.9 million years ago, the Waiʻanae volcano created the island of Oʻahu. About 2.5 million years ago, the Koʻolau volcano breached the ocean's surface and continued to grow in elevation until about 1.7 million years ago, when it went dormant. Most of the eastern or windward portion of Oʻahu are remnants of this volcano. Most of the familiar geographic landmarks of eastern Oʻahu were created by eruptions from Koʻolau from about 500,000 to 10,000 years ago. The eastern flank of the Koʻolau volcano including the caldera slid into the sea, leaving the Koʻolau mountain range that can be seen today on the windward side of the island.

The Hanauma Crater was created about 32,000 years ago during the Honolulu volcanic series, the latest (and perhaps final) round of volcanic activity to occur on Oʻahu. Tens of thousands of years ago, a series of volcanic vents opened along the southeast shoreline of Oʻahu. Unlike the gentle lava flows currently building the island of Hawaiʻi, the late-stage eruptions on Oʻahu were most often short-lived violent explosions. The volcanic vents that formed Hanauma Crater opened on the sea floor. Upwelling magma vaporized the ocean water and steam explosions blew the magma into fine ash. The explosions built cones or rings of ash, which solidified into tuff. The eruptions shattered the sea floor—coral reef and basalt—and scattered pieces that are now embedded in the tuff. Wave erosion eventually cut through the low, southeast wall of the crater, forming the current bay.

== Human history ==
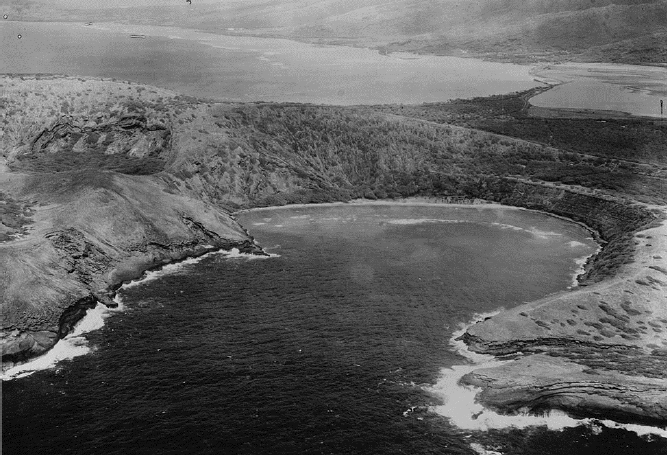
An aerial view of the bay in 1937.

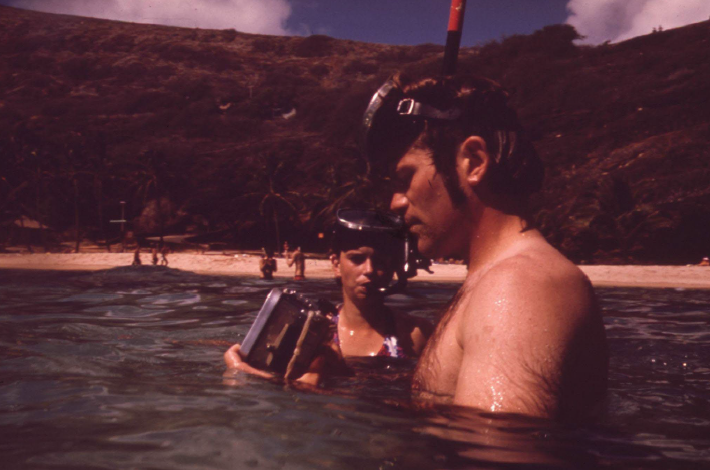
Snorkeling in the bay in 1973.

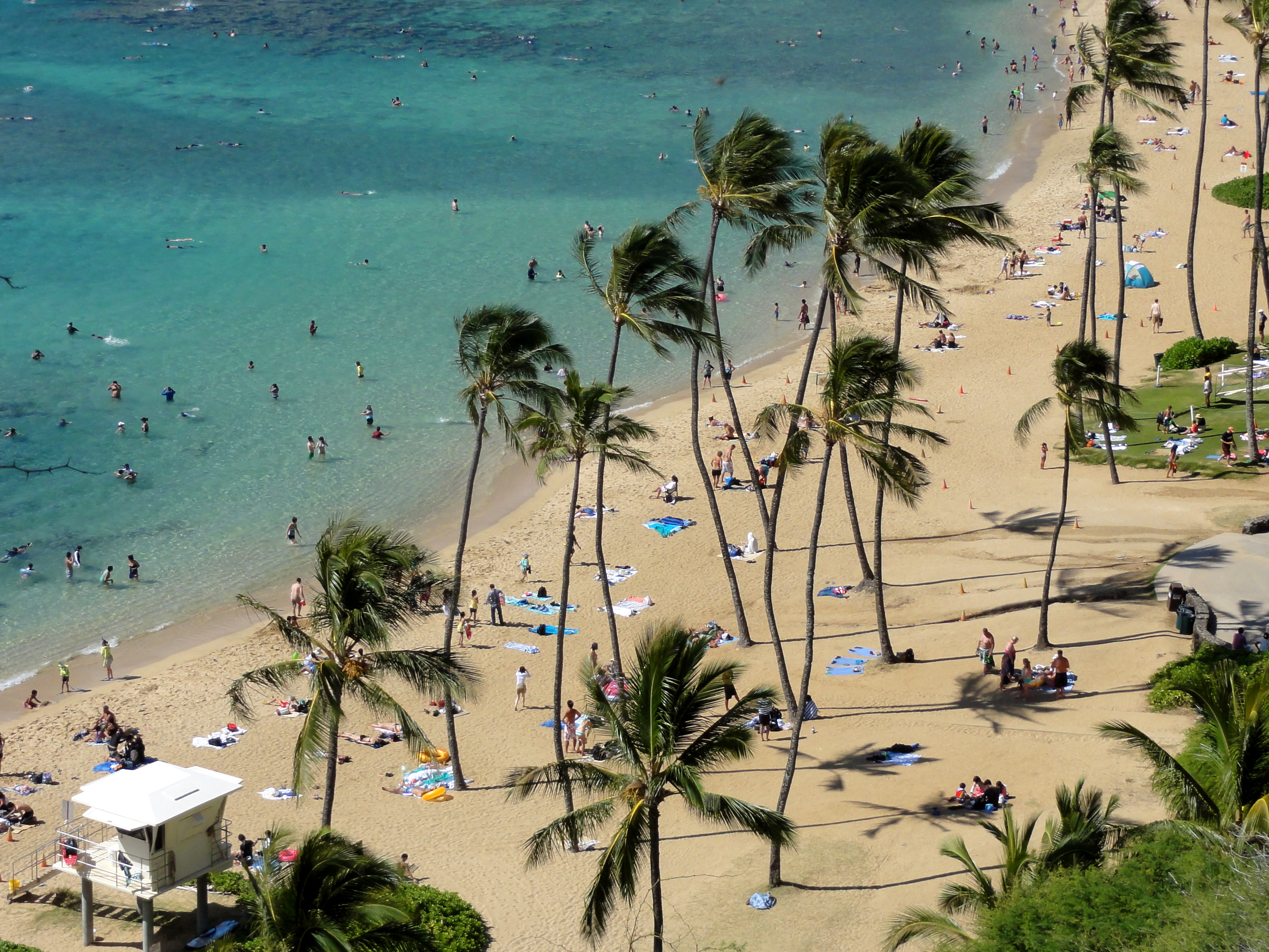
Beach area from above.

Due to the lack of fresh water in the vicinity, the area was not inhabited, although archeologists have found fishing tools and other indications of human presence there. The bay was used as a recreational area by aliʻi (Hawaiian nobility), including King Kamehameha and Queen Ka‘ahumanu, who fished, entertained visitors, and sponsored games there. It was also used as a layover and as a navigational lookout point, since the waters between Oʻahu and Molokaʻi are at times difficult.

Hanauma Bay was purchased from the Bernice Pauahi Bishop estate by the City and County of Honolulu, and subsequently opened for public use. It was initially a favorite fishing and picnic spot for residents who were willing to travel out to the bay. In the 1930s the road along Hanauma Bay's corner of Oahu was paved and a few other amenities provided that made it easier to visit the beach and reef. After the 1941 attack on Pearl Harbor, barbed wire was placed at the beach and a bunker was constructed for use by sentries. The Bay area reopened after the war and became even more visitor-friendly after blasting in the reef for a transoceanic cable provided room for swimming. Hawaii-themed films and television shows, including Blue Hawaii, Paradise, Hawaiian Style, Tora! Tora! Tora!, Hawaii Five-O, and Magnum, P.I., shot footage at the bay.

In 1967, it was set apart by the State division of Fish and Game as a Marine Protected Area, a term used generically to describe any marine area that had some or all of its resources protected. In Hanauma Bay's case everything became protected, from the fish to the reef, to the sand itself. A volunteer group set up a booth at the beach and began teaching visitors about conservation of the reef and fish who lived there. More changes in the 1970s by the City cleared more area in the reef for swimming, made an additional parking lot, and shipped in white sand from the North Shore, leaving Hanauma Bay increasingly more attractive to visitors.

By the late 1980s, the bay had become a major attraction on Oahu. Tourists were brought in by the busload and sometimes as many as 13,000 visitors descended on the beach in one day. Most were uneducated about the fragile marine ecosystem and, unwittingly, "these crowds stirred up sediment, disturbed and trampled the coral and algae, dropped trash, fed the fish and left a slick of suntan lotion on the bay's surface." Consequently, the beautiful multicolored coral reef closest to the beach died; only its blackened skeleton is visible today.

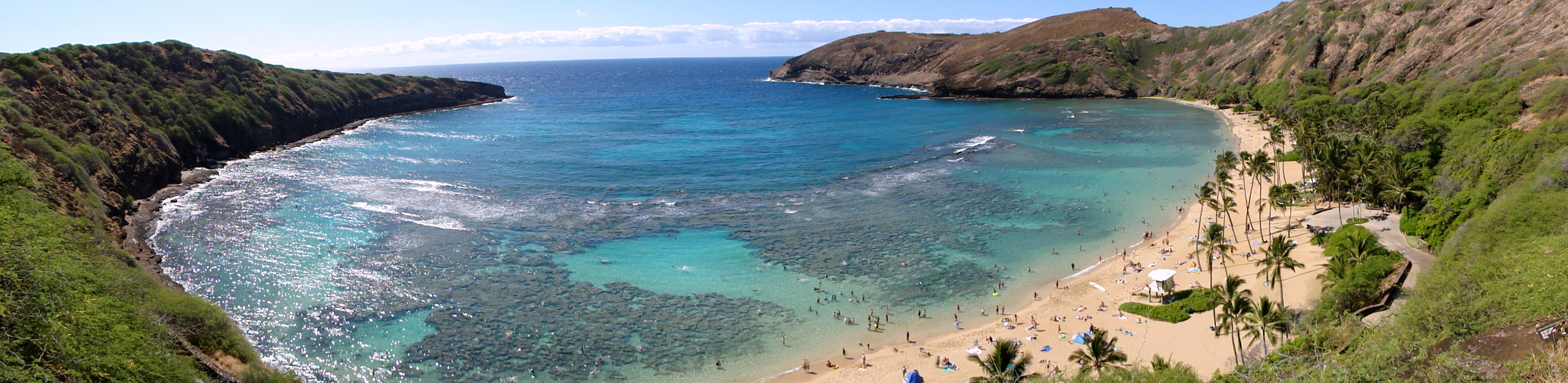
Panoramic view of Hanauma Bay

By 1990, overuse of the beach and surrounding area was a real problem, with visitors walking on the reef, swarming the surrounding areas, parking on the grass and on the sides of the road. Commercial filming was banned during that year. Measures were taken to limit use and so visitor access was limited to the parking lot, and when it was full everyone after was turned away. In 1997, the city of Honolulu levied an entrance fee on non-residents of the state, leading to a class action lawsuit by a visitor, which was settled in favor of the city during 2004. Then in August 2002 the Marine Education Center was opened at the entrance to the bay, where still today new visitors must watch a short film and receive instruction about conservation of the Bay's resources. Upon watching the film, visitors are allowed to sign a form and skip any subsequent film if they should return within the following 365 days.

== Visiting ==
Prior to 2020, Hanauma Bay saw an average of 3,000 visitors a day, with peak days reaching up to 10,000, or about 1 million per year – the majority of them being tourists. One of the largest threats to the bay is the approximately 412 lb (187 kg) of sunscreen that was deposited into Hanauma Bay every day. Sunscreen containing oxybenzone and octinoxate has been banned from the Hawaiian islands due to the deadly effects it has on coral reefs; however, sunscreens that do not have those harsh chemicals still have an effect on the reef's survival. The National Centers for Coastal Ocean Science (NCCOS) has found from oceanographic models that it takes approximately 50 hours for sunscreen deposited in a single day to be cycled out of Hanauma Bay. Hanauma Bay received sunscreen that would take two days to get rid of, but since the Bay never closed, the reef would not have the necessary time to recover. The COVID-19 pandemic caused the state park to see record lows, with this they also discovered the rehabilitation of the Hanauma Bay reef. The reservation system limits visits to 1,000 visitors per day, and the park is closed on Mondays and Tuesdays as well as holidays to give the fish a break from all the people disturbing their feeding, breeding, and other natural cycles that allow the reef to process the damage done by sunscreen pollution. The park has since been limited to 720 guests per day and requires online reservations for all non-residents. Upon entry, first-time visitors are required to watch a 9-minute video about the bay, its history, its delicate ecosystem, and how to sustainably visit the Bay, causing as minimal damage to the area as possible.

== Toilet Bowl ==
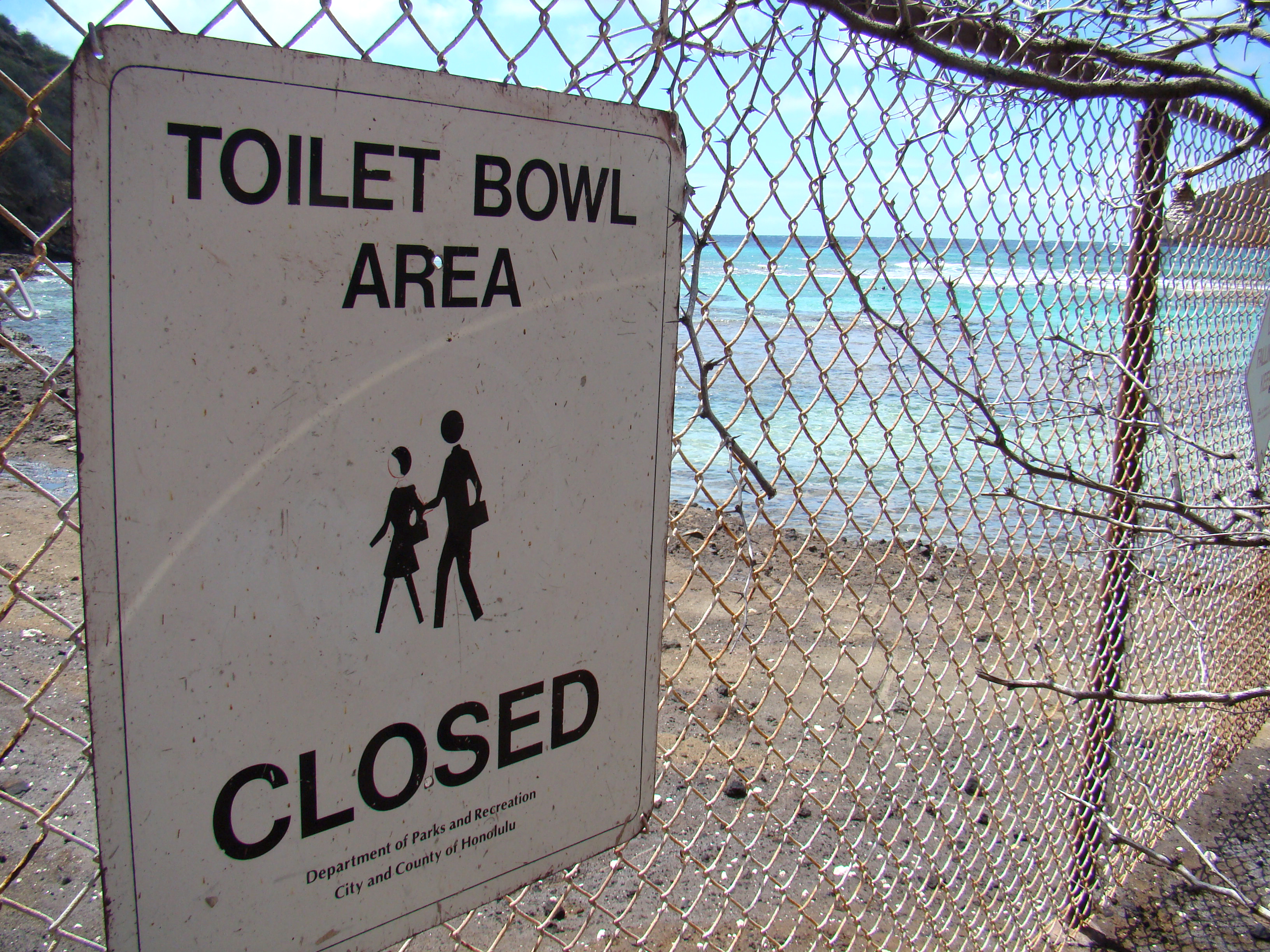
Toilet Bowl Area

Along the left point is the "Toilet Bowl", a natural spa tub that gently rises and falls with the tide. However, water in the Toilet Bowl can rise and fall with greater intensity during inclement weather conditions, and has caused injuries. Because of that, The Bowl has been permanently closed.
