= Windward Viaducts =

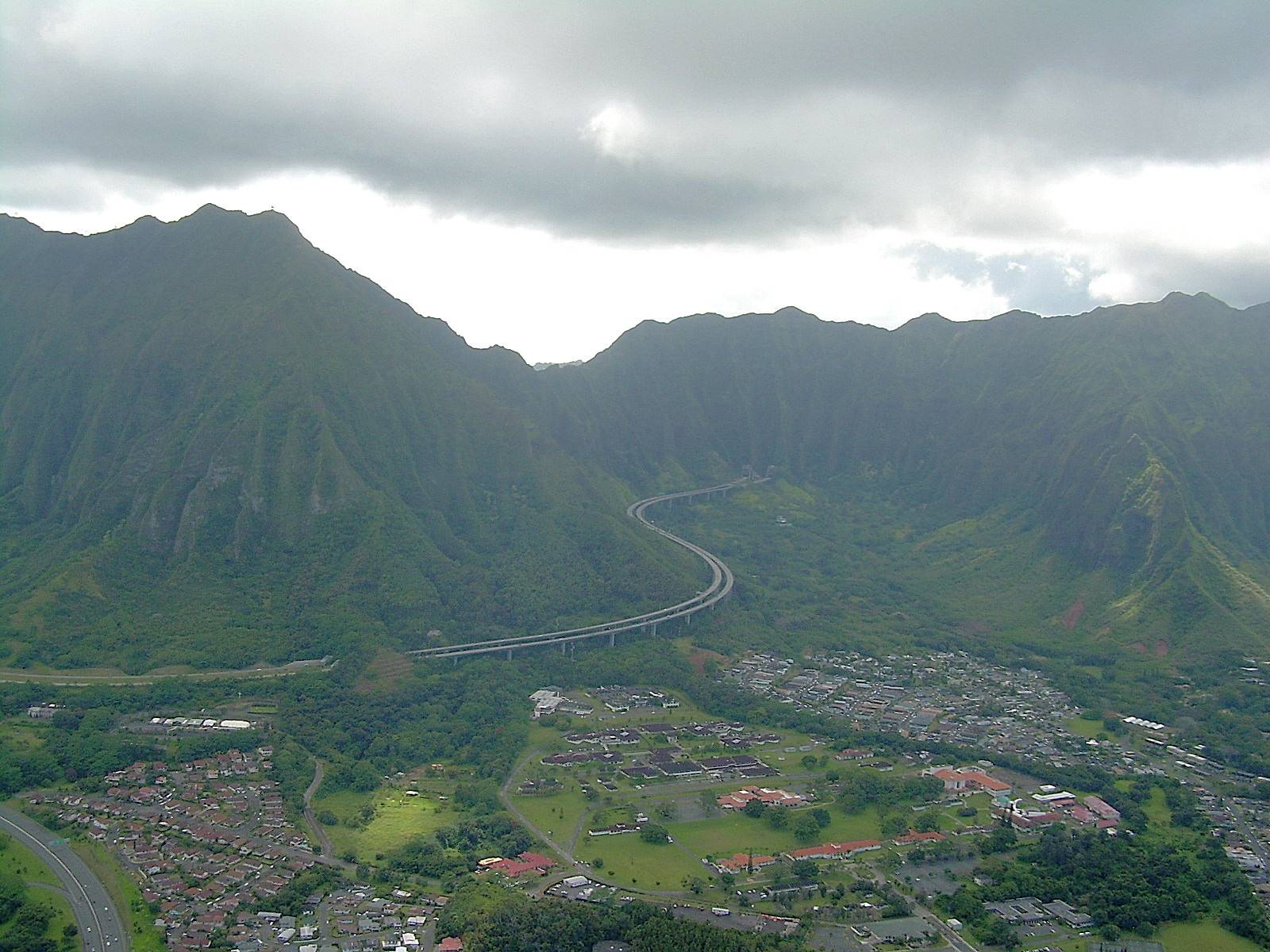
- The Windward Viaducts connecting the Hospital Rock Tunnels on the left with the longer Tetsuo Harano Tunnels in the background
- Coordinates: 21°24′18″N 157°49′12″W
- Carries: 4 lanes of H-3
- Locale: near Kaneohe, Hawaii

Characteristics
- Total length: Approximately 6,600 feet (2,000 m) in each direction

The Windward Viaducts are a pair of highway viaducts that pass along the edge of the Ko‘olau Range between the Tetsuo Harano Tunnels and the Hospital Rock Tunnels on the island of O‘ahu in the State of Hawaii. The viaducts are located on Interstate H-3, which connects Kaneohe with the Interstate H-1 and Interstate H-201 freeways at Hālawa near Pearl Harbor. These structures are among the longest bridges in Hawaii and are considered an engineering marvel.
