= Hospital Rock Tunnels =

Highway tunnels in Hawaii

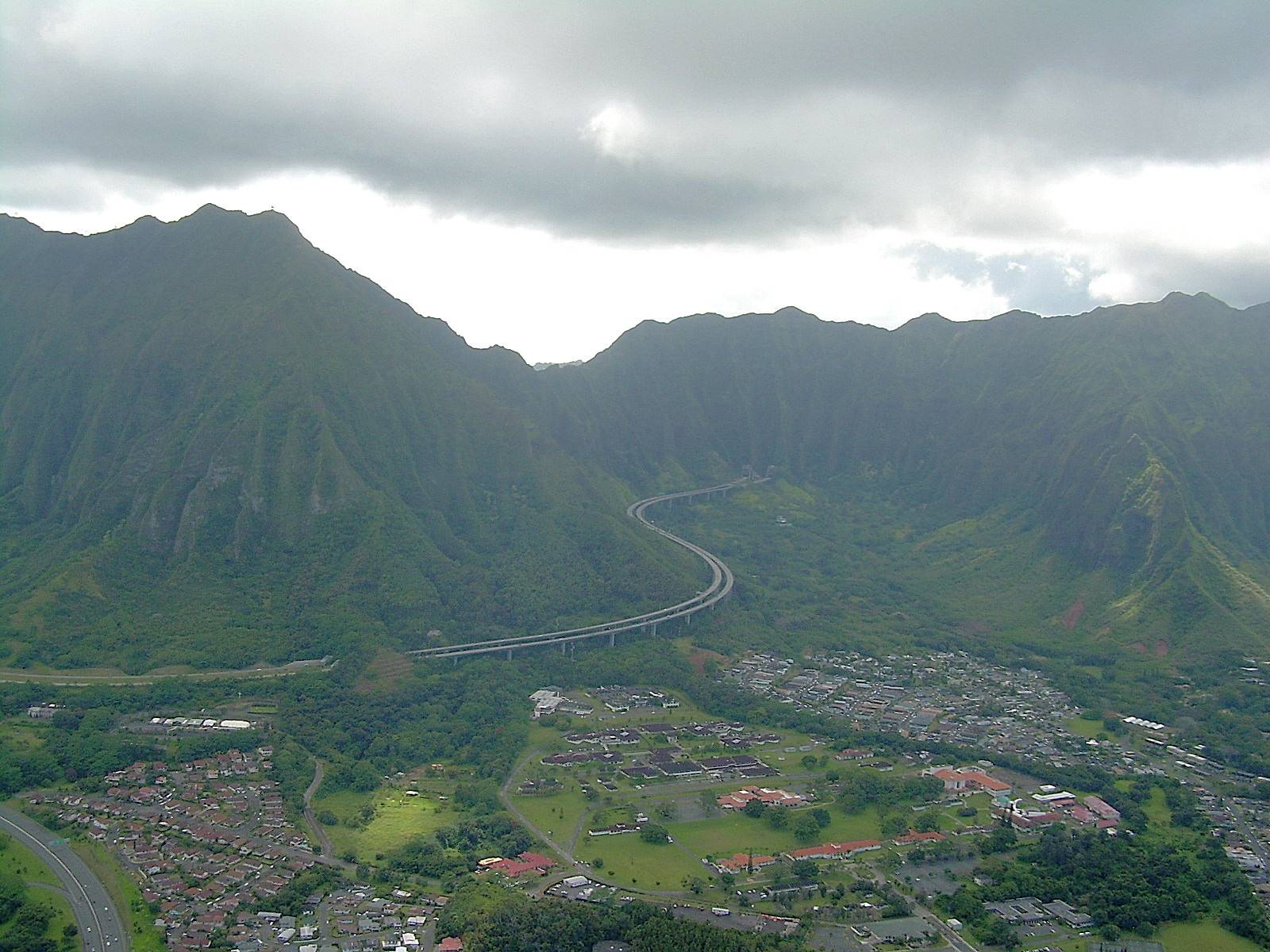
- Hospital Rock Tunnels in the foreground, to the left. The larger Tetsuo Harano Tunnels are seen entering the range in the background.
- Interactive map of Hospital Rock Tunnels

Overview
- Official name: memorial rock
- Location: near Kaneohe, Hawaii
- Coordinates: 21.401816°N 157.81505°W
- Route: H-3

Technical
- Length: 354 feet (108 m) Kaneohe bound 353 feet (108 m) Halawa bound
- No. of lanes: 4

The Hospital Rock Tunnels are a small pair of highway tunnels passing through a ridge on the edge of the Ko‘olau Range on the island of O‘ahu, Hawaiʻi, USA. The tunnels are located on Interstate H-3, which connects Kaneohe with Interstate H-1 at Hālawa near Pearl Harbor, and are 354 feet (108 m) long Kaneohe bound and 353 feet (108 m) long Halawa bound. The tunnels are "cut and cover" tunnels.

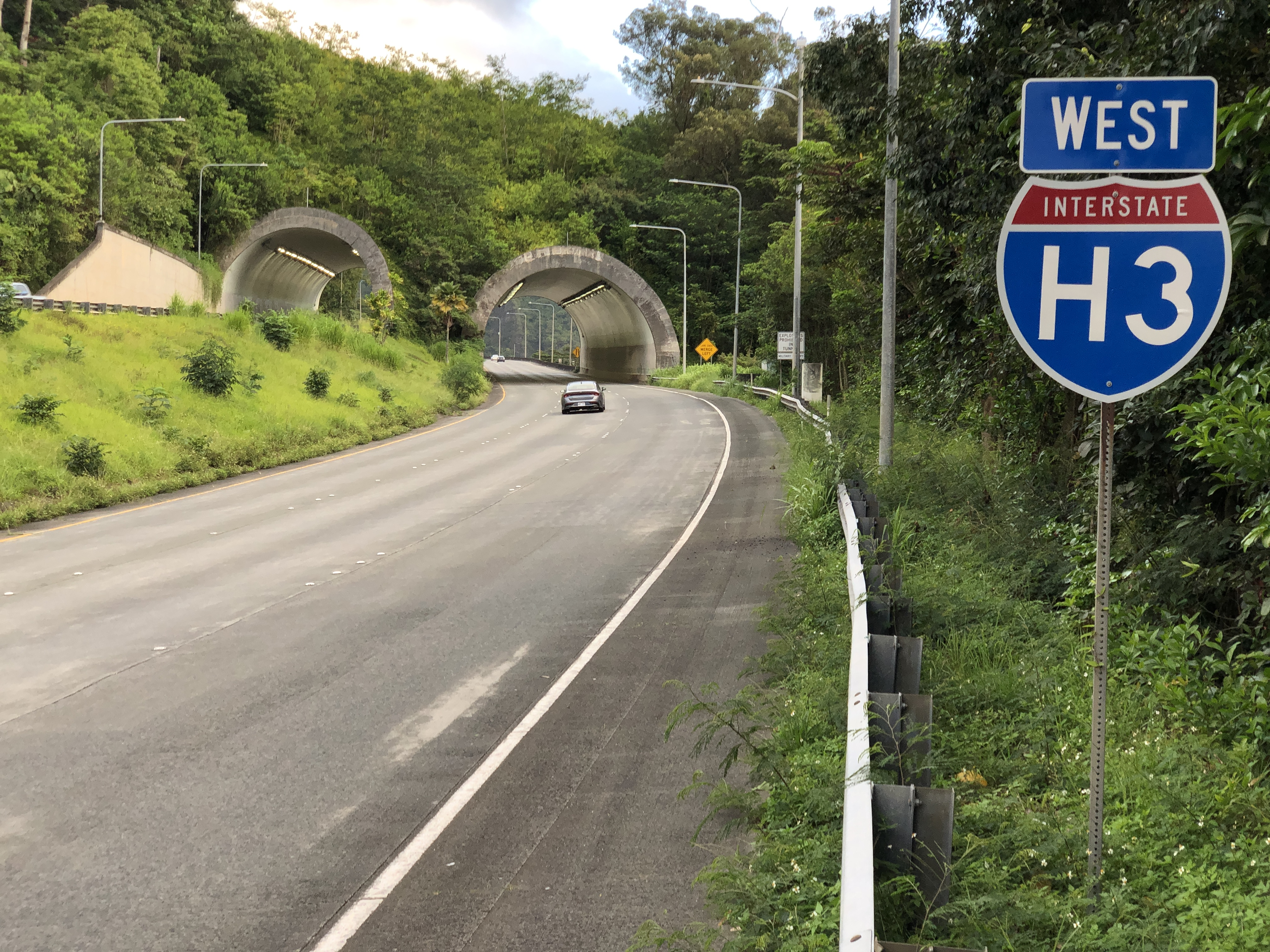
H-3 westbound approaching the tunnels

Also nearby are the larger Tetsuo Harano Tunnels.
