= John H. Wilson Tunnels =

Highway tunnels in Hawaii

- Interactive map of John H. Wilson Tunnels

Overview
- Route: Likelike Highway
- Start: Kāneʻohe
- End: Honolulu

Operation
- Work began: January 1954
- Opened: November 1960
- Operator: Hawaii State Department of Transportation

Technical
- Length: 2,775 ft (846 m)

The John H. Wilson Tunnels are a pair of highway tunnels passing through the Ko‘olau Range on the island of O‘ahu. The tunnels are located on Likelike Highway (Route 63), which connects Kāneʻohe with Honolulu, and are 2775 feet (845.8 m) long westbound and 2813 feet (857.4 m) long eastbound, at 21°22′39″N 157°48′54″W.

The tunnels are named after former Honolulu Mayor John H. Wilson, who built the first carriage road over the Nu‘uanu Pali in 1898. While mayor, Wilson advocated a tunnel connecting Kaneohe with Honolulu through Kalihi Valley. The City and County of Honolulu spent US$12 million on the tunnels and highway. Construction started on the Honolulu-bound tunnel in January 1954, and the Kāneʻohe-bound tunnel in 1957. Five people died during their construction, and they were opened to traffic in November 1960. The tunnels are now maintained by the Hawaii State Department of Transportation.
