= Hālawa, Hawaii =

Census-designated place in Hawaii, United States

Hālawa
- Census-designated place
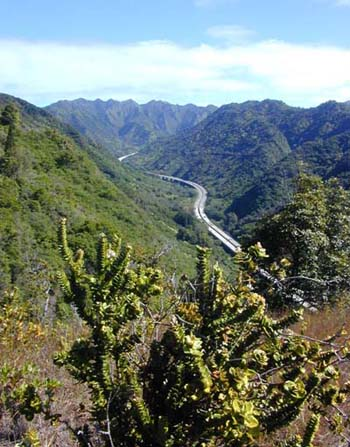
- Interstate H-3 in Hālawa Valley looking towards the Ko'olau crest

- Location in Honolulu County and the state of Hawaii
- Coordinates: 21°22′31″N 157°55′06″W
- Country: United States
- State: Hawaii
- County: Honolulu

Area
  - Total: 2.39 sq mi (6.19 km^{2})
  - Land: 2.39 sq mi (6.19 km^{2})
  - Water: 0 sq mi (0.00 km^{2})
- Elevation: 184 ft (56 m)

Population (2020)
  - Total: 15,016
  - Density: 6,286.0/sq mi (2,427.05/km^{2})
- Time zone: UTC-10 (Hawaii-Aleutian)
- Area code: 808
- FIPS code: 15-10000
- GNIS feature ID: 2414027

Hālawa (Hawaiian pronunciation: [haːˈlɐvə], lit. 'curve') is a census-designated place (CDP) in the ‘Ewa District of Honolulu County, Hawaii, United States. Hālawa Stream branches into two valleys: North and South Hālawa; North Hālawa is the larger stream and fluvial feature. Their confluence is within the H-3/H-201 highways exchange. Most of Hālawa Valley is undeveloped. As of the 2020 census, the CDP had a population of 15,016.

Camp H. M. Smith, the headquarters of the United States Indo-Pacific Command, is located here. The Hālawa (Aloha Stadium) Skyline station is located at the base of the valley.

== Cultural history ==
The entire ahupua'a of Hālawa is highly sacred to Kanaka Maoli. At the far Makai (ocean) side at Pu'uloa or Pearl Harbor, it is, according to Kanaka Maoli beliefs, the home of the shark goddess Ka'ahupahau, known as the "Queen of Sharks", who protected O'ahu and strictly enforced kind, fair behavior on the part of both sharks and humans. Until the late 1890s, the home of Ka'ahupahau was famously lined with beds of pearl oysters, however, according to Kanaka Maoli religious experts who follow the goddess, Ka'ahupahau removed all of the oysters (and some say, herself) because the area was being abused by human misdeeds. Today, the water of Pearl Harbor has been highly contaminated by nuclear defueling and other toxic influences, and has thereby been designated as a Superfund site.

The upland, or Mauka, portion of Hālawa is sacred to Papahānaumoku, the Kanaka Maoli form of Mother Earth, as it is, according to legend, her birthplace and primary home, as well as one of only two or three known remaining Hale o Papa, women's temples where Papa is worshipped. The valley contains many religious and other cultural sites sacred to Kanaka Maoli. Although many sites were destroyed by the invasion of Kahekili II and especially by the building of the highly controversial H-3 Freeway, many remain and are cared for by Kanaka Maoli Aloha 'Aina practitioners to this day.

In the last two decades, North Hālawa has been the site of a very public battle over the religious sites and ecological resources destroyed by H-3, which is the most expensive freeway per mile in human history. At least two species were driven to probable extinction (none have been sighted since construction began), many more are declining rapidly, the main aquifer of the area was badly damaged, and religious sites were seriously impacted. Although the freeway was opened in 1997, many are still fighting for mitigation of these impacts, and some are asking for the freeway's closure. In 1993, thirteen cultural practitioners were arrested while conducting a ceremony to pray for the healing of the valley. Their lele (religious altar) was destroyed, and the caretakers of the area were barred from entrance to the sites. Today, some of these caretakers, many of them kupuna (elders), have returned to care for the sites, although they now do so through a layer of soot and with the roar of the freeway as a constant sonic backdrop. Many kanaka maoli do not use the freeway because of these impacts, and because of the lasting belief that the road is haunted—an often-attributed explanation for the high accident rate on the freeway (more generally believed to be caused by the high speeds often used by the motorists who traverse it).

There is evidence in the documentary record that upper Hālawa was highly significant to Kanaka Maoli. Most of the evidence may be, however, be in the oral record. The Hale O Papa and luakini are mentioned in the massive collection of Bishop Museum reports that took many years to finally be released. However, there was no archaeological evidence that these structures existed by the time of highway construction. The area has been greatly impacted by sugarcane plantations, homesteading, and light industrial use. The site of Waipao Heiau, for example, is currently occupied by a food distribution warehouse.

The Papa temples were associated with the great Ku temples (luakini), which demanded human sacrifice and were usually in areas of greater population and state sponsorship. Without a luakini, there would be no Hale o Papa, according to Samuel Kamakau (see Bishop Museum, H-3 project reports).

== Neighborhoods ==
Historically, Hālawa was an ahupua'a, or area of land ruled by chief or king and managed by the members of the ʻaliʻi.

"Neighborhoods" of Hālawa are very disjointed, in part because of the significant highway exchanges (see below) that now occupy nearly all of the lower end of Hālawa Valley between Red Hill and Aloha Stadium. Much of the remainder of the valley along both sides of Interstate H-3 is developed into commercial and light industrial properties. On the east side of H-3 are found the State Animal Quarantine Station and the Halawa High and Medium Security Facility (main O‘ahu prison).

Where the valley widens out closer to Pearl Harbor occur residential neighborhoods: Foster Village adjacent to Āliamanu; and the stadium area between Aloha Stadium and Makalapa. The interfluve (uplands between valleys) on the west comprises Halawa Heights, extending up to Camp H. M. Smith. Along the lower, western edge, Halawa Heights merges with the neighborhoods of ‘Aiea.

The U.S. Postal Code for Halawa Heights is 96701 (the same as for Aiea). The postal code for Foster Village, the stadium area, and Makalapa is 96818 (the same as Āliamanu).

== Geography ==
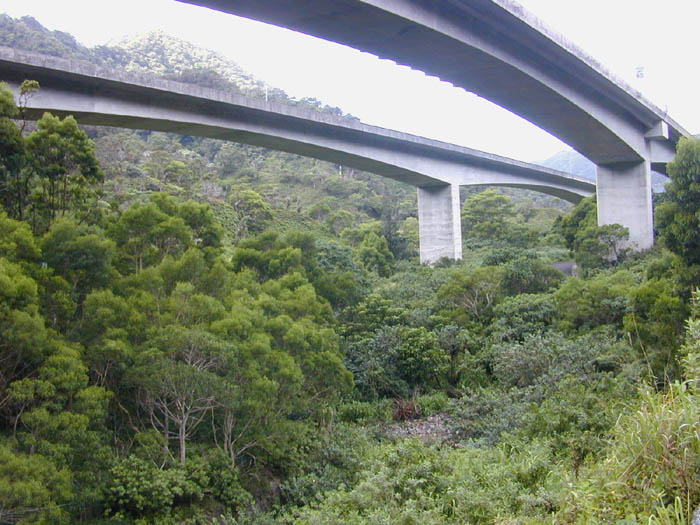
Hālawa viaducts, carrying H-3

Hālawa is located at 21°22′39″N 157°55′22″W (21.377633, -157.922759).

According to the United States Census Bureau, the CDP has a total area of 2.3 square miles (6.0 km^{2}), all land.

The route of H-3 extends from its western terminus with east–west Moanalua Freeway (H-201; connecting eastward to Honolulu or westward to H-1 and Aiea) to the 1100-foot (335-m) elevation entrance into the Tetsuo Harano Tunnels, penetrating the Ko‘olau crest. The freeway continues beyond to Kaneohe on windward Oahu.

A significant proportion of H-3 within the valley is carried on the Windward Viaducts; although very expensive to construct, the viaduct is the only way to construct a freeway of this magnitude through such a narrow valley without flooding and destabilization concerns; it is also believed to offer some returns in terms of preservation of both archeological sites and stream ecology.

== Demographics ==
Historical population
Census	Pop.	Note	%±
1990	13,408		—
2000	13,891		3.6%
2010	14,014		0.9%
2020	15,016		7.1%

As of the census of 2000, there were 13,891 people, 4,142 households, and 3,276 families residing in the CDP. The population density was 5,974.5 inhabitants per square mile (2,306.8/km^{2}). There were 4,289 housing units at an average density of 1,844.7 per square mile (712.2/km^{2}). The racial makeup of the CDP was 15.50% White, 1.83% African American, 0.20% Native American, 50.90% Asian, 10.43% Pacific Islander, 0.84% from other races, and 20.31% from two or more races. Hispanic or Latino of any race were 6.52% of the population.

There were 4,142 households, out of which 30.3% had children under the age of 18 living with them, 60.1% were married couples living together, 13.9% had a female householder with no husband present, and 20.9% were non-families. 15.5% of all households were made up of individuals, and 5.2% had someone living alone who was 65 years of age or older. The average household size was 3.28 and the average family size was 3.64.

In the CDP the population was spread out, with 23.4% under the age of 18, 9.9% from 18 to 24, 28.3% from 25 to 44, 22.6% from 45 to 64, and 15.8% who were 65 years of age or older. The median age was 37 years. For every 100 females there were 98.8 males. For every 100 females age 18 and over, there were 98.3 males.

The median income for a household in the CDP in 2000 was $63,176, and the median income for a family was $68,519. Males had a median income of $35,764 versus $28,527 for females. The per capita income for the CDP was $21,868. About 7.5% of families and 10.1% of the population were below the poverty line, including 20.9% of those under the age of 18 and 3.7% of those 65 and older.

== Recreation ==
Aloha Stadium is located in Hālawa CDP.

== Government and infrastructure ==
The Hawaii Department of Public Safety operates the Halawa Correctional Facility in an area near Hālawa.

== Education ==
Hawaii Department of Education operates public schools. Aiea Elementary School, Gus Webling Elementary School, and Aiea Intermediate School are in Hālawa CDP.
