= James B. Castle High School =

Public high school in Hawai, United States

Location
- 45-386 Kaneohe Bay Drive; Kaneohe, Hawaii 96744; United States

Information
- Type: Public, Co-educational, Creative and Performing Arts
- Motto: "Character, Commitment, Competence"
- Established: 1951
- School district: Windward District
- Principal: Bernadette Tyrell
- Faculty: 80.00 FTE
- Grades: 9-12
- Enrollment: 1,173 (2017-18)
- Student to teacher ratio: 14.66
- Campus type: Rural
- Colors: Maroon, White, and Gold
- Athletics: Oahu Interscholastic Association
- Mascot: Knight
- Rival: Kailua High School, Kalaheo High School
- Newspaper: Na Pali O Ko’olau
- Yearbook: Kaulana
- Website: http://castlehs.k12.hi.us

James Bicknell Castle High School, more commonly James B. Castle High School or simply Castle High School, is a public high school located in Kāneʻohe CDP, City and County of Honolulu, Hawaiʻi.

The school serves grades 9 through 12 and has an enrollment of around 1150 students. The school is part of the Windward Oʻahu Subdistrict of the Hawaii Department of Education.

== History ==
In 1927, the Reverend Benjamin Parker School (originally called Kāneʻohe School) opened in Kāneʻohe, Oʻahu. It started as an elementary and intermediate school, grades 1-8.

Over the years, it expanded in size and grades taught; in 1937 it became an elementary and high school, grades 1-12. In 1940, Benjamin Parker School was a founding member of the Rural O‘ahu Interscholastic Association (ROIA – with Kahuku, Leilehua, Waialua and Waipahu.)

Parker began bursting at the seams ... “Congestion and inadequate accommodations at Benjamin Parker School in Kaneohe, was disclosed Thursday in a letter to the Mayor and board of supervisors by Joseph T Ferreira, of the department of public instruction, who has asked for the installation of three Quonset huts to relieve the conditions.”

Castle High School was founded in 1951. Ground was broken in 1949 for a new windward school. On “January 2, 1951, Principal Clinton Kanahele and his 700 students of Benjamin Parker Elementary and High School made their move to the new Benjamin Parker Annex on Kāne‘ohe Bay Drive.”

“During the first year of operation, approximately 750-students enrolled in grades 7-12. A library, an office and four more classrooms were under construction.” (Star Bulletin)

“At the start of the 1951-1952 school year, the name changed to James B Castle High and Intermediate School. In June, 1952, 108-seniors made up the first graduating class of the James B Castle Intermediate and High School. (In 1965, Castle became a high school servicing grades 9-12. Grades 7-8 were then served at King Intermediate School.)

When Castle High and Intermediate started, the old Parker School reverted to an elementary school, serving grades K – 6.

Castle High School is on land donated by the Castle family and is named after Hawai‘i-born James Bicknell Castle, son of American Protestant Missionary Samuel Northrop Castle (also founder of Castle and Cooke.)

== The Community ==
James B. Castle High School is located in Kaneohe, on the Windward side of the island of Oahu. Established in 1951, it is considered a commuter community with 94.7 percent of the adult population working outside the area. Once considered rural, it is now a densely populated residential area (population of 50,000) with a mix of condominiums, single-family dwellings, acre estates, five small public housing complexes, commercial businesses, and some light industry. Based on the 2019 census report, the median family income was $108,761. 5.1% of the community is considered poor. There are eight elementary schools and one intermediate school that feed into Castle High School.

== The School ==
James B. Castle High School is a comprehensive four-year public high school, grades 9-12, with a current enrollment of approx. 1201 students and 85 teaching faculty for the 2015-2016 school year including a senior class of 287 students. Currently, 42% of the school population qualify for the federally assisted free or reduced lunch program.

Castle High started Smaller Learning Communities (SLC) in 2012 to provide a personalized learning environment of a small, focused learning community. Teachers and students integrate academic and occupation-related classes as a way to enhance real-world relevance and maintain high academic standards. All students will belong to one of the four SLCs of which approximately, 30% of our graduating seniors go on to a four-year college & approx. 50% attend a community college. Additionally, 6% go to business or trade school, 2% enroll in a military service, and the remaining 12% find employment. The needs of exceptional students are supported by Special Education and 504 programming.

Castle High was accredited in 2011 by the Western Association of Schools and Colleges for a period of 6 years, and adopted School-Community-Council in place of School/Community Based Management (SCBM).

In 1977 The Castle High Marching Band became the first high school in the United States to play the half-time show at the annual East–West Shrine Game.

The high school also has an internationally recognized performing arts program, Castle Performing Arts Center, or "CPAC" has produced multiple shows which have been the Hawaii premiere of those shows and participated in the 2009 Fringe Festival in Edinburgh, Scotland. The theatre is named after Ronald E. Bright, former director at Castle and founder of CPAC.

== School Administration ==
Current Principal:

- Bernadette Tyrell, As of 2016–Present

Past Principals:

- Sheena Alaiasa, 2014-2015
- Meredith Maeda, 1999-2014
- Barbara Teruya, 1995-1999
- Robert Ginlack, 1987-1994
- Richard Hadama, 1981-1987
- Herbert Uesugi, 1980-1981
- Harold E. Chong, 1975-1980
- Claudio R. Suyat, 1967-1975
- Howard Nakashima, 1960-1967
- Clarence N. Watson, 1952-1960
- Clinton Kanahele, 1951-1952

== Athletics ==
Castle Athletics participates in the Oahu Interscholastic Association.

Baseball | Basketball (boys and girls) | Bowling | Cheerleading | Cross country | Football | Golf | Judo (boys and girls) | Paddling | Riflery | Soccer (boys and girls) | Softball | Soft tennis | Swimming | Tennis (boys and girls) | Track and field (boys and girls) | Volleyball (boys and girls) | Water polo (girls)| Wrestling (boys and girls) |

== Notable alumni ==
Listed alphabetically by last name:

- Kimee Balmilero, actor
- Bryan Clay, Olympian decathlete. Olympic Gold and Silver medalist
- Aloha Wong Dalire, kumu hula and hula dancer, first Merrie Monarch Festival's Miss Aloha Hula winner (1971)
- Alika DeRego, volleyball player: U.S.A Open National Championship, Gold & Silver medalist
- Carlos Diaz, former professional baseball player (Atlanta Braves, New York Mets, Los Angeles Dodgers)
- John Kapele, former NFL defensive end
- Lisa Kitagawa, member of the Hawaii House of Representatives
- Linda Taira, journalist
- Jill Tokuda, member of the U.S. House of Representatives, Hawaii's 2nd Congressional District
- Dean Wilson, professional golfer
- Marjorie Ziegler, naturalist, environmental activist and writer
