= Tetsuo Harano Tunnels =

Highway tunnels in Hawaii, United States

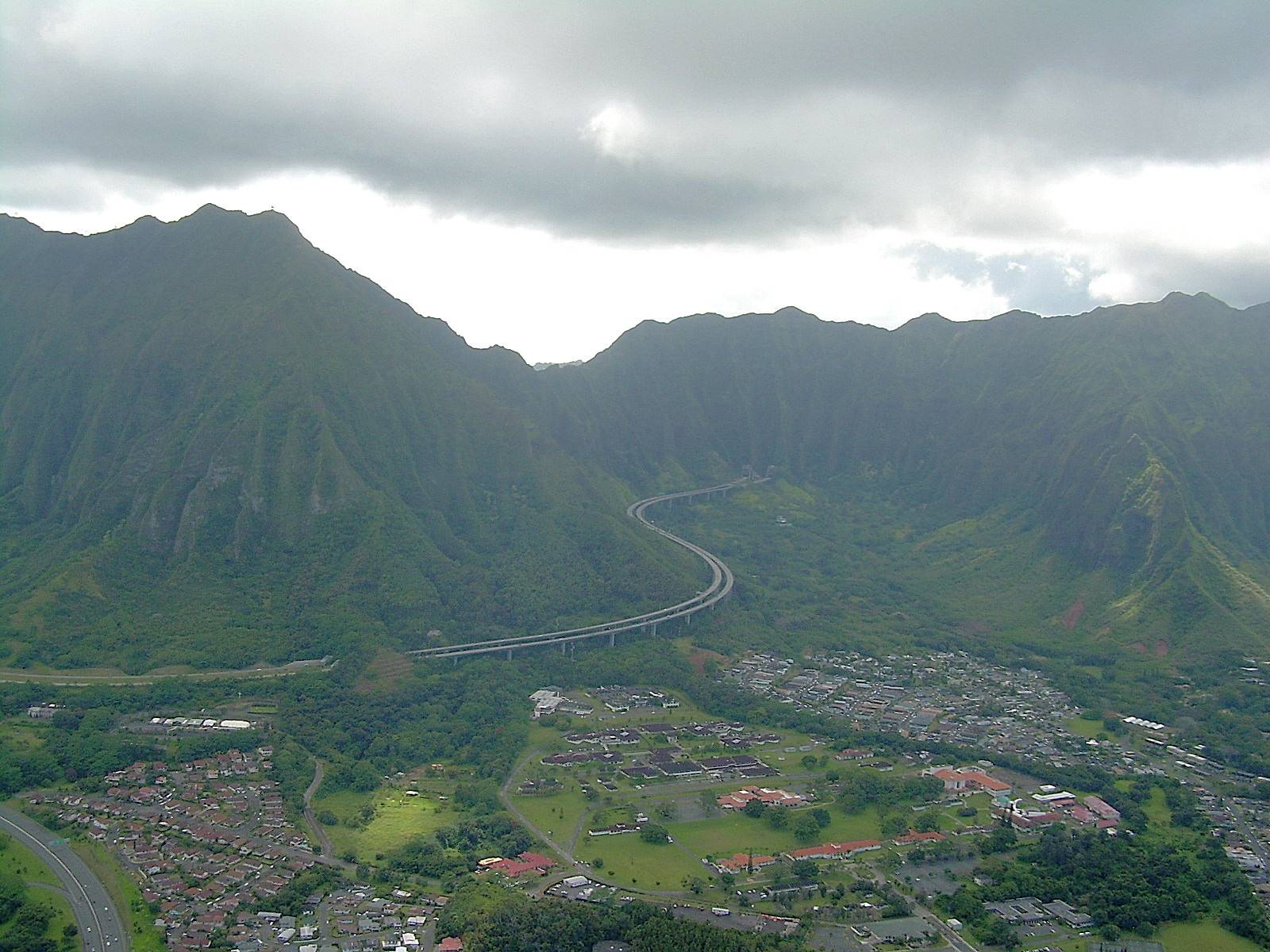
- Aerial view of the tunnel's eastern entrance. The smaller Hospital Rock Tunnels can be seen in the foreground, to the left.
- Interactive map of Tetsuo Harano Tunnels

Overview
- Location: near Kaneohe, Hawaii
- Coordinates: 21.4033°N 157.8352°W
- Route: H-3

Technical
- Length: 4,980 feet (1,520 m) Kaneohe bound 5,165 feet (1,574 m) Halawa bound
- No. of lanes: 4

The Tetsuo Harano Tunnels are a pair of highway tunnels passing through the Koʻolau Range on the island of O‘ahu. The tunnels are located on Interstate H-3, which connects Kaneohe with Interstate H-1 at Hālawa near Pearl Harbor, and are 4,980 feet (1,520 m) long Kaneohe-bound and 5,165 feet (1,574 m) long Halawa-bound.

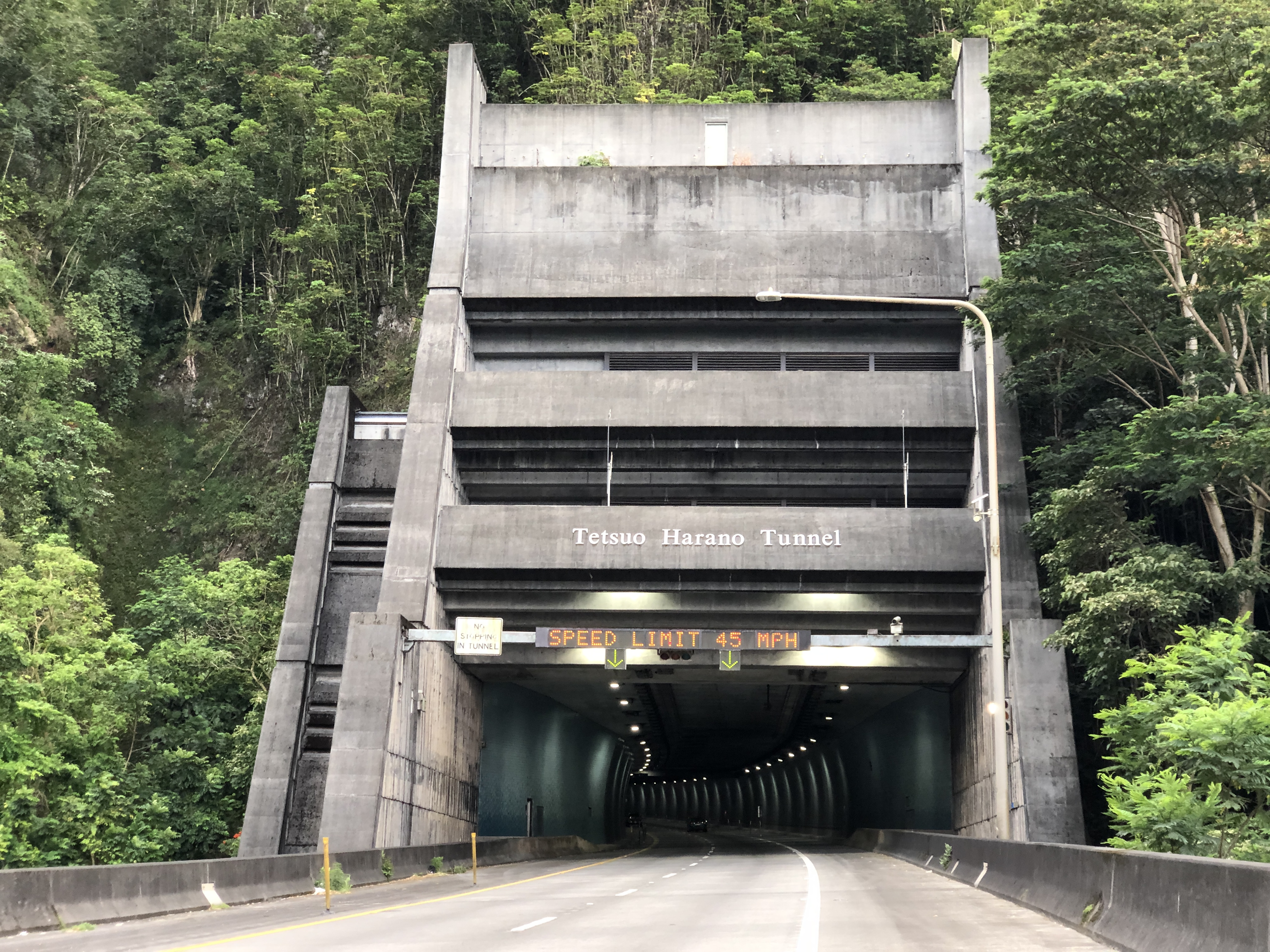
Entrance portal for the westbound tube

The tunnels are named for Tetsuo Harano, a former state highways administrator who served the state for 52 years. The tunnels were briefly renamed for the former Governor of Hawaii John A. Burns but due to the efforts of Yoshie Tanabe and Kongo Kimura, were restored to the original name by Governor Linda Lingle after she took office.

Also nearby are the smaller Hospital Rock Tunnels.

== History ==
A tunnel through the region was planned in the 1960s, as part of Hawaii's Interstate Boom. However, ever since it's conception, it faced long opposition.
