= Olomana =

Olomana may refer to:

- Olomana, a series mountain peaks on the island of Oahu, Hawaii
- Olomana, a steam locomotive
- Olomana High & Intermediate School
