= Hawaii Route 63 =

State highway in Honolulu County, Hawaii, US

Hawaii Route 63
- Route 63 highlighted in red

Route information
- Maintained by HDOT
- Length: 7.3 mi (11.7 km)

Major junctions
- South end: Route 92 in Honolulu
- North end: Route 83 / Route 830 in Kaneohe

Location
- Country: United States
- State: Hawaii
- Counties: Honolulu

Highway system
- Routes in Hawaii
← Route 61	→ Route 64

Route 63 is a state highway on the island of Oʻahu in Honolulu County, Hawaiʻi, United States, that is one of three main highways passing through the Koʻolau mountain.

== Route description ==
The highway passes through the Wilson Tunnel, and takes commuters from the towns of Kāneʻohe and Kailua on the windward (northeast) side of the island, through Kalihi Valley into Honolulu on the leeward (south) side of the island. The other trans-Koʻolau highways are Pali Highway and Interstate H-3. There is a runaway truck ramp on the highway.

Likelike Highway (pronounced LEE-kay-LEE-kay) is named after Hawaiian Princess Miriam Likelike, sister of King David Kalākaua.

== Names of Route 63 ==
- Likelike Highway from Kāneʻohe to Interstate H-1
- Kalihi Street south of Interstate H-1

== Major intersections ==
The entire route is in Honolulu County.

Location	mi	km	Destinations	Notes
Honolulu			Route 92 (Nimitz Highway)	
Honolulu			H-1 (Freeway)	H-1 exit 20A; no access from Route 63 north to H-1 west or H-1 to Route 63 south
			John H. Wilson Tunnel	
Kaneohe			H-3 west – Pearl Harbor	H-3 exit 9; southbound exit and northbound entrance
Kaneohe			Route 83 (Likelike Highway / Kahekili Highway) – Kahaluu, Laie, North Shore	
1.000 mi = 1.609 km; 1.000 km = 0.621 mi

== Gallery ==
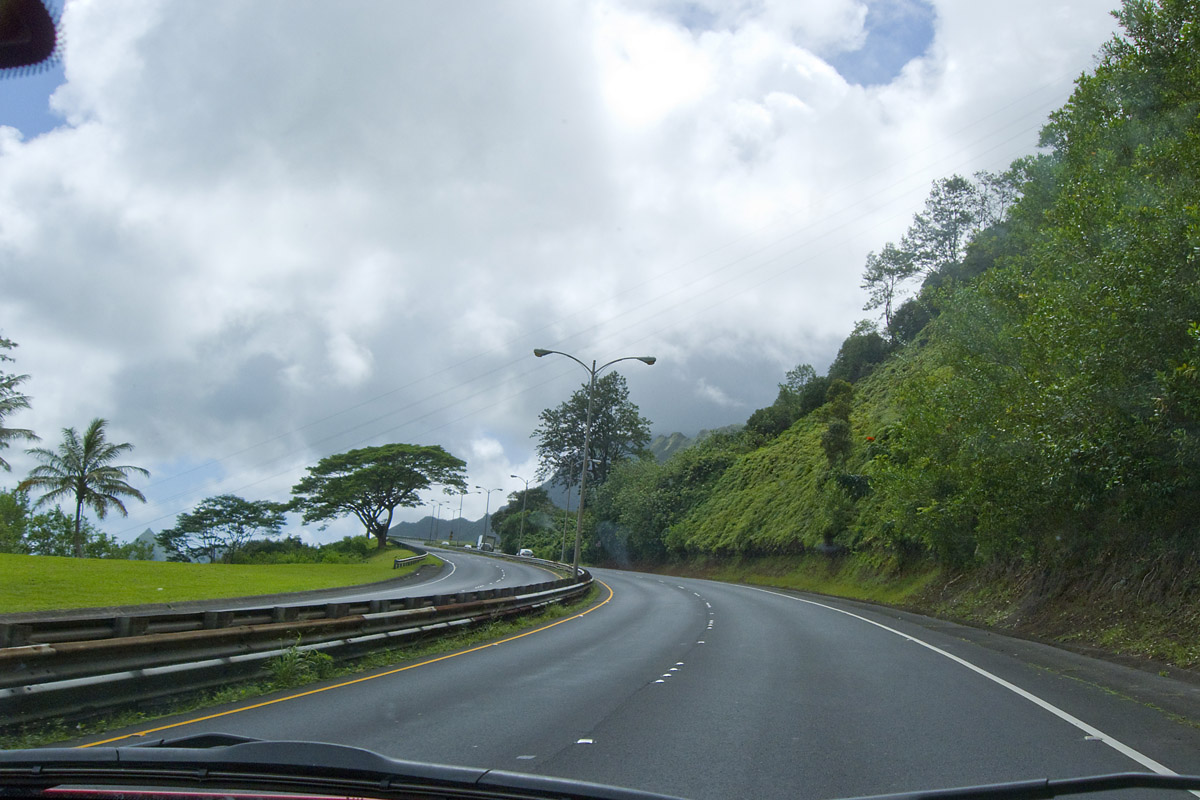
Likelike Highway, August 2009

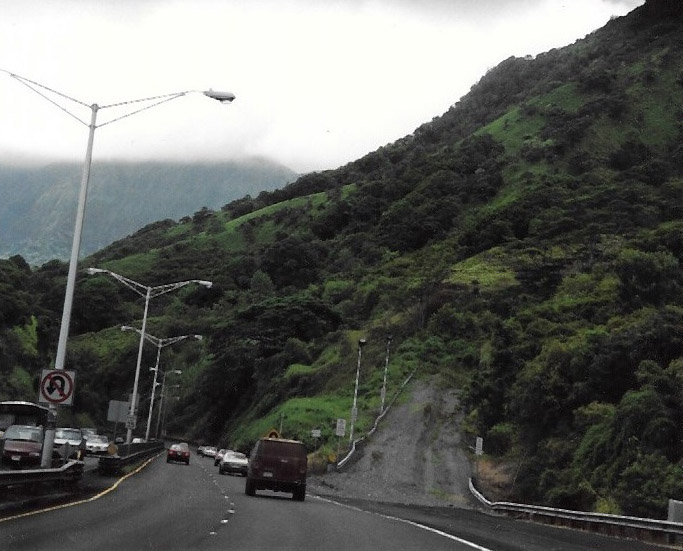
Runaway truck ramp on Hawaii Route 63

== See also ==
- List of state highways in Hawaii
- List of highways numbered 63
