= Kōnāhuanui =

Mountain in Hawaii

- Konahuanui
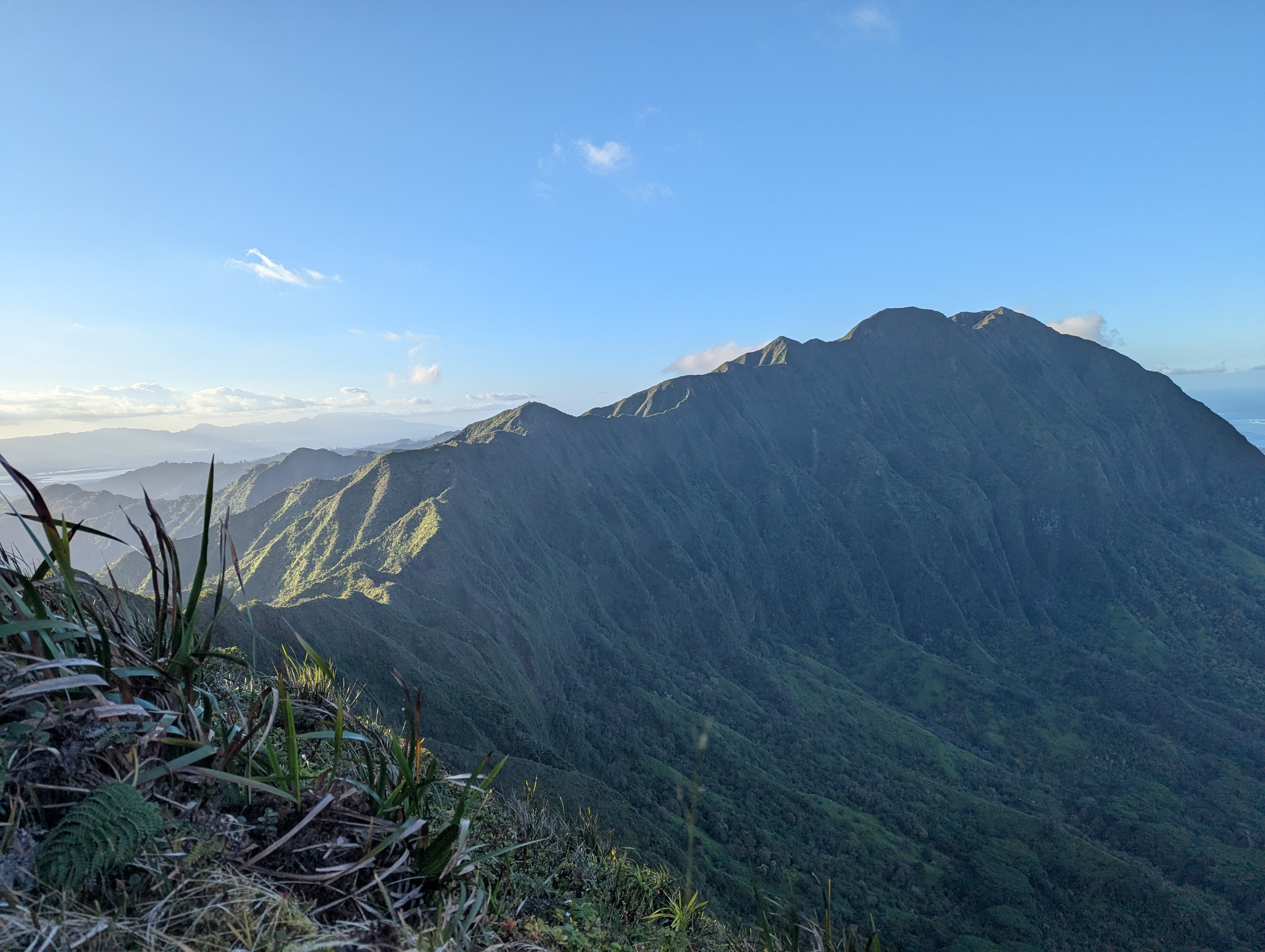
- Kōnāhuanui, seen from near the summit of Mount Olympus

Highest point
- Elevation: 3,150 feet (960 m)
- Prominence: 2,290 ft (700 m)
- Coordinates: 21°21′13″N 157°47′19″W

Geography
- Location within Hawaii
- Location: Honolulu County, Hawaii
- Parent range: Koʻolau Range

Puʻu Kōnāhuanui consists of two mountain peaks, Kōnāhuanui 1 (commonly abbreviated K1) and Kōnāhuanui 2 (K2), located in Honolulu County, Hawaii. It is the highest point in the Koʻolau Mountains and second highest point on the island of Oahu.

The Hawaiian word "Kōnāhuanui" roughly translates to "large testicles" in English. This alludes to a legend that states the mountain originated from the testicles of a giant, who threw them at a woman trying to escape from him.
