= Linda Taira =

Japanese-American journalist from Hawaii

Linda Taira is an American journalist and consultant from Hawaii. She was the first Japanese American woman to work as a correspondent on network television.

== Biography ==
Taira is the granddaughter of Okinawan immigrants, Kame and Kamado Taira, who immigrated from Oroku, Okinawa in 1907. Two of her paternal uncles, Masaru and Wilfried, enlisted in the 442nd Infantry Regiment, a segregated regiment composed almost entirely of second-generation Japanese-Americans, during the internment of Japanese Americans. Masaru Taira died in the fighting at Hill 140 outside of Livorno. Her parents met in Tokyo during the US occupation of Japan.

Taira attended James B. Castle High School outside of Honolulu. She attended the University of Hawaiʻi at Mānoa on a scholarship from the Okinawan organization Hui Makaala, working as a nightshift reporter at a local TV station KHON-TV, and graduated with a B.A. in journalism in 1978. In October 1983, Taira joined KING-TV in Seattle as a reporter in the Washington bureau. She later graduated from the Columbia University Graduate School of Journalism and worked as the chief congressional correspondent for CNN from 1985 to 1988. She also hosted CNN's Newsmaker talk show.

For her coverage of the Iran-Contra hearings, Taira was awarded the National Headliner Award by the University of Hawaii Alumni Association. Taira later worked a CBS News correspondent covering New York and D.C., named as a correspondent for the Northeast bureau in December 1992. Taira covered the final summit between the Soviet Union and the United States under George H. W. Bush., the American Airlines strike, and the confirmation hearings in the nomination of Clarence Thomas to the Supreme Court. In 1989 she was the chairwoman of the House and Senate radio and Television Galleries within the United States Senate Daily Press Gallery. She later was the vice president of station relations and corporate secretary at the national headquarters of PBS.

Taira left journalism to work in public relations, before becoming a senior executive at Boeing for over a decade. In 2006, she was appointed to the Advisory Council of the Columbia University School of Social Work. In 2015, she was one of the delegates in the 2015 Japanese American Leadership Delegation, sponsored by the Japanese Ministry of Foreign Affairs.

== Personal life ==
Taira married her husband Bill Welch in 1992, after meeting at the Keating Five Senate ethics hearing. They have two children.
