= Richard H. Wasai =

American politician (1932–2003)

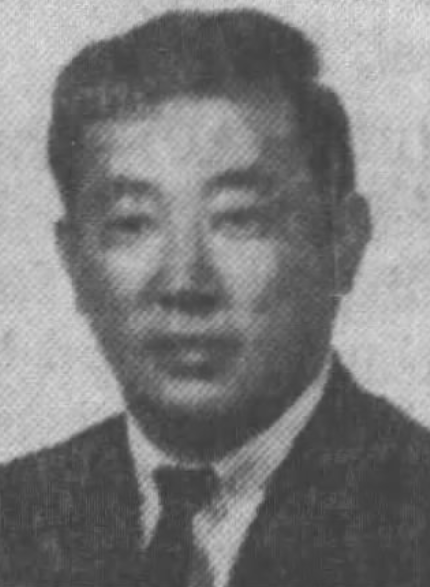
- Wasai in 1970

Member of the Hawaii House of Representatives
- In office 1971–1974

Personal details
- Born: Richard Hidenori Wasai; December 8, 1932 Lahaina, Territory of Hawaii, U.S.
- Died: October 24, 2003 (aged 70) Kaneohe, Hawaii, U.S.
- Party: Democratic

Richard Hidenori Wasai (December 8, 1932 – October 24, 2003) was an American politician. A member of the Democratic Party, he served in the Hawaii House of Representatives from 1971 to 1974.

== Life and career ==
Wasai was born in Lahaina, Territory of Hawaii, the son of Shindo and Shu Wasai. He attended the University of Miami, earning his BA degree in 1958, which after earning his degree, he worked as a schoolteacher.

Wasai served in the Hawaii House of Representatives from 1971 to 1974.

== Death ==
Wasai died on October 24, 2003 of pneumonia in Kaneohe, Hawaii, at the age of 70.
