= Lisa Kitagawa =

American politician

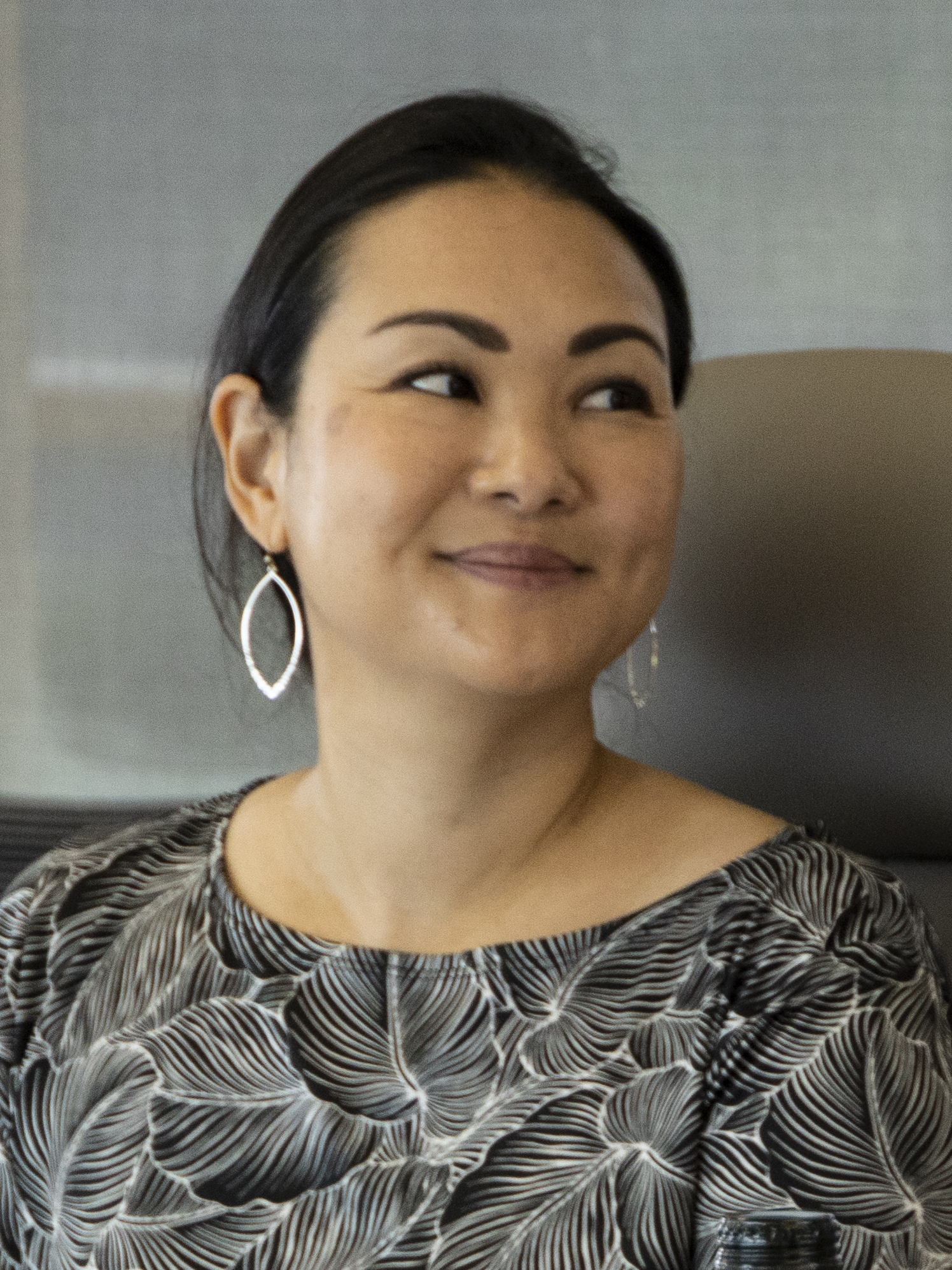
- Kitagawa in 2023

Member of the Hawaii House of Representatives from the 48th district
- Incumbent
- Assumed office November 6, 2018
- Preceded by: Jarrett Keohokalole

Personal details
- Born: 1979 or 1980 (age 46–47) Kaneohe, Hawaii, U.S.
- Party: Democratic
- Education: University of Hawaiʻi at Mānoa (BS, MEd)

Lisa Chiemi Kitagawa-Akagi is an American politician and former academic administrator serving as a member of the Hawaii House of Representatives from the 48th district. She assumed office on November 6, 2018.

== Early life and education ==
A fourth generation Japanese American (yonsei), Kitagawa was born and raised in Kaneohe, Hawaii. After graduating from James B. Castle High School, she earned a Bachelor of Science degree in family resources and Master of Education from the University of Hawaiʻi at Mānoa.

== Career ==
Kitagawa began her career as a faculty and student services specialist at the University of Hawaiʻi at Mānoa. She also worked in the office of State Representative Aaron Ling Johanson. She was elected to the Hawaii House of Representatives in 2018, succeeding Jarrett Keohokalole.
