= Marjorie Ziegler =

Environmental activist and writer from Hawaii (1956-2018)

- Born: Marjorie Fern Yasue Ziegler; January 14, 1956; Berkeley, California, U.S.
- Died: October 10, 2018 (aged 62); Kaneohe, Hawai'i, U.S.

Academic background
- Education: Windward Community College; University of Hawai'i at Mānoa (BA, MS)

Marjorie Fern Yasue Ziegler (January 14, 1956 – October 10, 2018) was a naturalist and conservation advocate from Honolulu County, Hawaii. Alongside a number of other environmental initiatives, she served as executive director of the Conservation Council for Hawaii for 15 years.

== Early life ==
Ziegler was born on January 14, 1956, in Berkeley, California. From age 10, she was raised in Kaneohe, Hawaii, where her love for nature quickly evolved.

Her mother, Kaye, was raised in Kyoto, Japan and developed a love for animals. Her father, Alan, served as the director of the Bishop Museum's Division of Vertebrate Zoology, leaving a legacy that included discoveries of native bird species and a book on Hawaii's natural history.

Growing up, Ziegler had a variety of pets, including those that were domesticated and semi-wild. Additionally, her father would occasionally store animal specimens in the family freezer, which were clearly labeled as unsuitable for consumption.

Marjorie joined expeditions with her father in the Sierras, which led to a conservation ethic that later became evident in her advocacy for Hawaii's native flora and fauna.

=== Education ===
Ziegler attended public schools on the Windward side of Oahu, including Kapunahala Elementary School, Castle High School, and Windward Community College. As a teenager, she worked as an archaeological assistant at Kualoa Regional Park, and as a recreation assistant at Kailua District Park.

Ziegler went on to receive a BA and MS in geography at the University of Hawaiʻi at Mānoa. There, she found support for her growing purpose to protect Hawaii's threatened and endangered species. A friend of Ziegler's noted that Ziegler was very "proud to be a geographer".

== Career ==
Ziegler interned at the Nature Conservancy under Audrey Newman. She then spent 14 years as a resource analyst with the environmental nonprofit Earthjustice, previously known as the Sierra Club Legal Defense Fund.

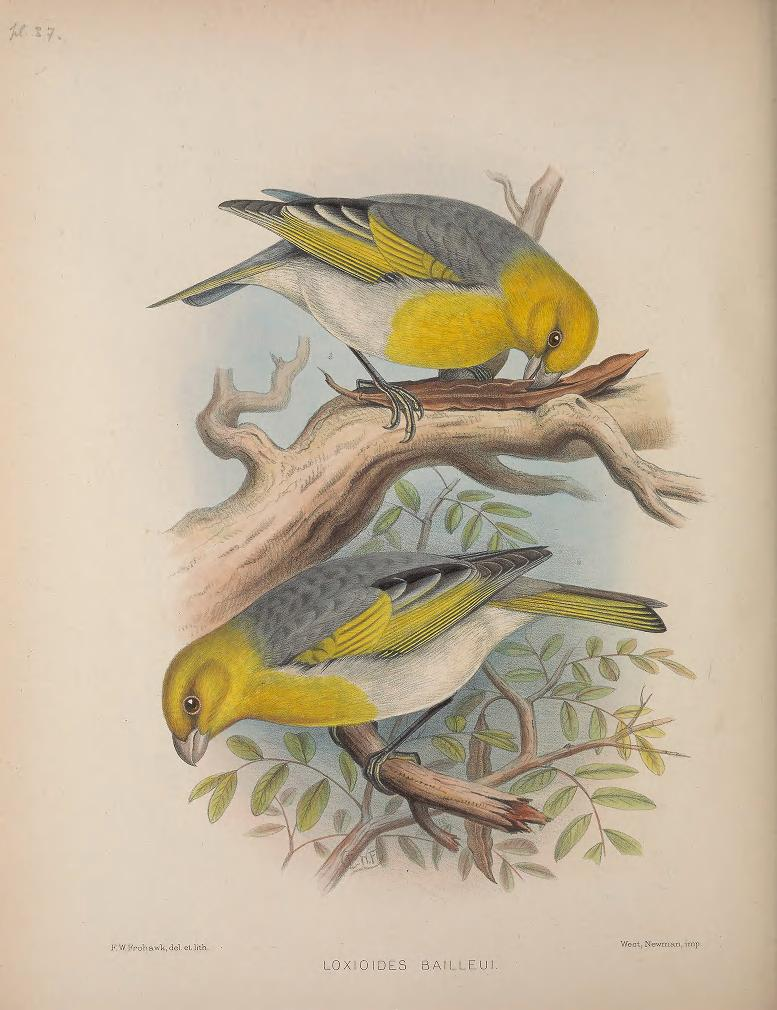
Illustration of Palila Birds (Loxioides bailleui) from The Birds of the Sandwich Islands by Frederick William Frohawk

As executive director of the Conservation Council for Hawaii for the next 15 years, Ziegler developed the Poster Partner program to bring environmental issues to the youth of Hawai'i and on efforts to protect the palila and endangered honeycreeper on Mauna Kea. In 2016, she publicly disputed a campaign against the expansion of the Papahanaumokuakea Marine National Monument. The expansion would protect ocean ecosystems around those islands. The expansion was eventually approved by Barack Obama. After her death, the Conservation Council for Hawaii created the Marjorie Ziegler Legacy Fund to continue her work in protecting and saving the endemic species of Hawaii.

Along with Andria Benner and Patricia Tummons, Ziegler co-founded Environment Hawaii, a monthly newsletter about the environmental issues and concerns of Hawaii.

Ziegler was also fundamental in advancing the Environmental Legislative Network educational program. She served on the City and County of Honolulu's Clean Water Commission and the Hawaii's Natural Resources Legacy Land Commission.

She was recognized with an Outstanding Leadership Award by Hawaii Conservation Alliance in 2011 as a person who has "demonstrated exceptional leadership in advancing environmental conservation in Hawaii over the short to medium term (several years to a decade)".

In 2019, the Hawaii State Legislature noted that Ziegler's work had an "unparalleled impact on the Hawaii's conservation landscape".

== Death ==
Ziegler suffered a heart attack and her health significantly declined in her last year. She died in her sleep on October 10, 2018, at her family home in Kaneohe, Hawaii at the age of 62.
