= Environment Hawaii =

Environment Hawaii is a monthly newsletter published in Hilo, Hawaii. It focuses on investigative reporting about Hawaii's environment. The newsletter made its debut in July 1990, co-founded by Andria Benner, Patricia Tummons, and Marjorie Ziegler. The newsletter sued the Hawaii Department of Land and Natural Resources in 1997 for failing to comply with Hawaii's open meeting act, resulting in the department changing their processes. A 2022 investigation by the newsletter into public corruption in Hawaii's housing department resulted in the indictment of a housing official and several private individuals for wire fraud.

== History ==
Environment Hawaii was founded on Oahu in 1990 by Patricia Tummons, Marjorie Ziegler, and Andria Benner. Tummons had previously spent fourteen years working at the St. Louis Post-Dispatch and suggested creating a newsletter focused on environmental issues. She and Ziegler each provided $1,000 in funding for the newsletter, gathered signups at a series of Earth Day festivals, and published the first issue in July 1990. The paper moved to Hilo in 1993 to save money, while also reincorporating as a nonprofit organization.

In the paper's early years, Tummons was the sole writer, occasionally assisted by part-time help recording public meetings. In 1997, Tummons hired Theresa Dawson as the paper's second reporter. Dawson, a recent graduate of the University of Hawaii, agreed to work for the newsletter for only $500 a month. That same year, Environment Hawaii filed a joint lawsuit with Common Cause against the Hawaii Department of Land and Natural Resources alleging that the department was not releasing board minutes in a timely manner and had not done so for at least a decade. The lawsuit was resolved in their favor in 1998, with the department acknowledging that they had violated Hawaii's open meetings law.

In 2022 the newsletter published an investigation into corruption in the Hawaiʻi County housing department, which resulted in the prosecution of at least one housing official. The official pled guilty to wire fraud for accepting almost $2 million in illegal kickbacks. Multiple private individuals, including two attorneys and a businessman, were also indicted. The newsletter's reporting on the scheme also led to a reorganization in the county Office of Housing and Community Development and to the county halting the practice of issuing housing credits before units were actually constructed. Tummons was awarded the O'o Award by the Big Island Press Club for her reporting into the scheme.

== Format ==
The newsletter started as an eight-page monthly paper but expanded to 12 pages in 1992. Initially every issue focused on a single theme. Today, each issue is printed in color and includes photos. An online edition is also available.

== Recognition ==
The newsletter has been consistently recognized by the Society of Professional Journalists' Hawaii chapter at its Excellence in Journalism Awards.
