= Interstate H-3 =

Interstate Highway in Hawaii, US

Interstate H-3
- John A. Burns Freeway
- H-3 highlighted in red

Route information
- Maintained by HDOT
- Length: 15.32 mi (24.66 km)
- Existed: December 12, 1997–present
- NHS: Entire route

Major junctions
- West end: H-1 in Aiea
- H-201 in Halawa
- East end: Marine Corps Base Hawaii main gate

Location
- Country: United States
- State: Hawaii
- Counties: Honolulu

Highway system
- Interstate Highway System; Main; Auxiliary; Suffixed; Business; Future; Routes in Hawaii
← H-2	→ Route 11

Interstate H-3 (H-3) is an Interstate Highway located entirely within the US state of Hawaii on the island of Oʻahu. H-3 is also known as the John A. Burns Freeway, after the second governor of Hawaii. It crosses the Koʻolau Range along several viaducts and through the 5,165-foot-long (1,574 m) Tetsuo Harano Tunnels as well as the much smaller Hospital Rock Tunnels.

Despite the number, signage is that of an east–west highway. Its western terminus is at an interchange with H-1 at Halawa near Pearl Harbor. Its eastern end is at the main gate of Marine Corps Base Hawaii (MCBH). This route satisfies the national defense purpose of connecting MCBH with the US Navy port at Pearl Harbor off H-1.

Orders for the freeway were granted in 1960, followed by planning stages. Construction, amid enormous community protest, was begun in the late 1980s, although the road did not open until December 12, 1997. Environmental complaints and legal challenges halted construction at many points. Construction resumed during the late 1980s after a move by US Senator Daniel Inouye, who, in 1986, had the freeway exempted from most environmental laws as a rider on a Department of Defense budget bill.

H-3 was the most expensive Interstate Highway ever built, on a cost-per-mile basis. Its final cost was $1.3 billion (equivalent to $2.35 billion in 2024), or approximately $80 million per mile ($50 million/km; equivalent to $145 million per mile [$90 million/km] in 2024).

== Route description ==
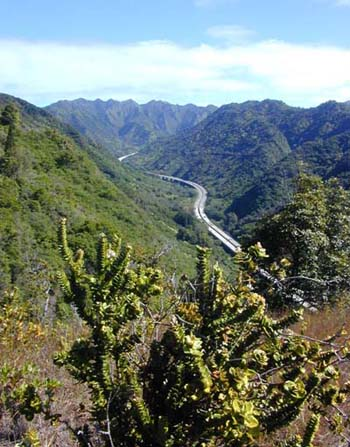
H-3 in Hālawa Valley looking toward the Koʻolau Range crest

H-3 begins northwest of Downtown Honolulu at the Halawa Interchange with H-1 and auxiliary route H-201. The interchange is adjacent to Aloha Stadium and northeast of Joint Base Pearl Harbor–Hickam, which includes Pearl Harbor National Memorial. H-3 has direct access to H-1, which continues south to Daniel K. Inouye International Airport and west toward Pearl City, and an onramp from the Aloha Stadium parking lot. The freeway travels east along Hālawa Stream and parallel to H-201, which it intersects near Salt Lake. H-3 then turns northeast and heads toward Koʻolau Range by following Hālawa Valley.

The freeway then runs on Windward Viaducts through Hālawa Valley for about six miles (9.7 km) until it reaches the Tetsuo Harano Tunnels through Koʻolau Range. Once on the eastern end of the tunnel, the freeway follows a viaduct built along the side of Haʻikū Valley until the Kaneohe Interchange with Route 63 (Likelike Highway) which leads into the town of Kāneʻohe. The freeway then continues past the Kaneohe Interchange to the Halekou Interchange with Route 83 (Kamehameha Highway) and from there to the Kauila interchange with Route 65 (Mokapu Saddle Road) and the Mokapu Interchange serving Kaneohe Bay Drive. After the Mokapu Interchange, H-3 spans a causeway between Kāneʻohe Bay and Nuʻupia Pond and ends at the main gate of MCBH.

== History ==
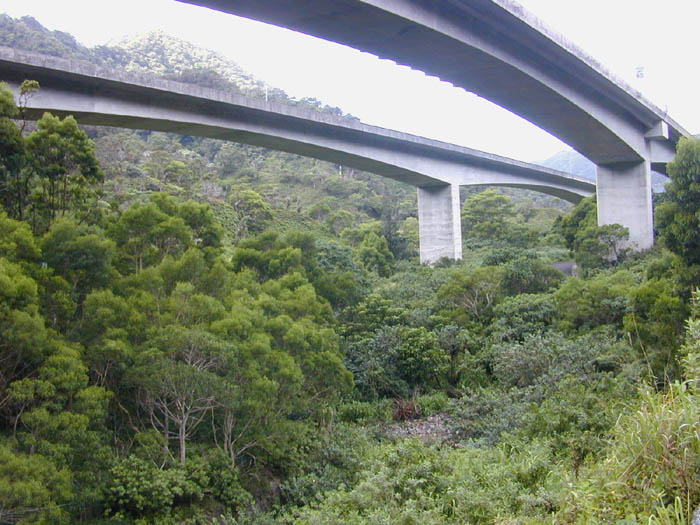
Viaducts of H-3 within Hālawa Valley

A set of Interstate Highways on Oʻahu were approved for funding by the US Congress in 1960, a year after Hawaii was admitted as a state. A corridor connecting the Honolulu area to Kāneʻohe was included in the plan and was designated as "Interstate H-3" by the Bureau of Public Roads (now the Federal Highway Administration) on August 29, 1960.

Since its inception, the H-3 freeway has been mired in controversy. The original route was not set to be in current Hālawa Valley, but rather, the nearest major valley due east, in the Moanalua ahupuaʻa. The Damon family hurried to create the Moanalua Gardens Foundation in 1970 to join the forces of all political and cultural groups who opposed the freeway's construction through their tract of land. The foundation's pinnacle no-build argument was the need to remove a significant historical stone containing ancient petroglyphs, Pohaku ka Luahine, which, to this day, stands intact along the Moanalua valley trail. Success came their way as this freeway route was dropped, but H-3 would merely be rerouted.

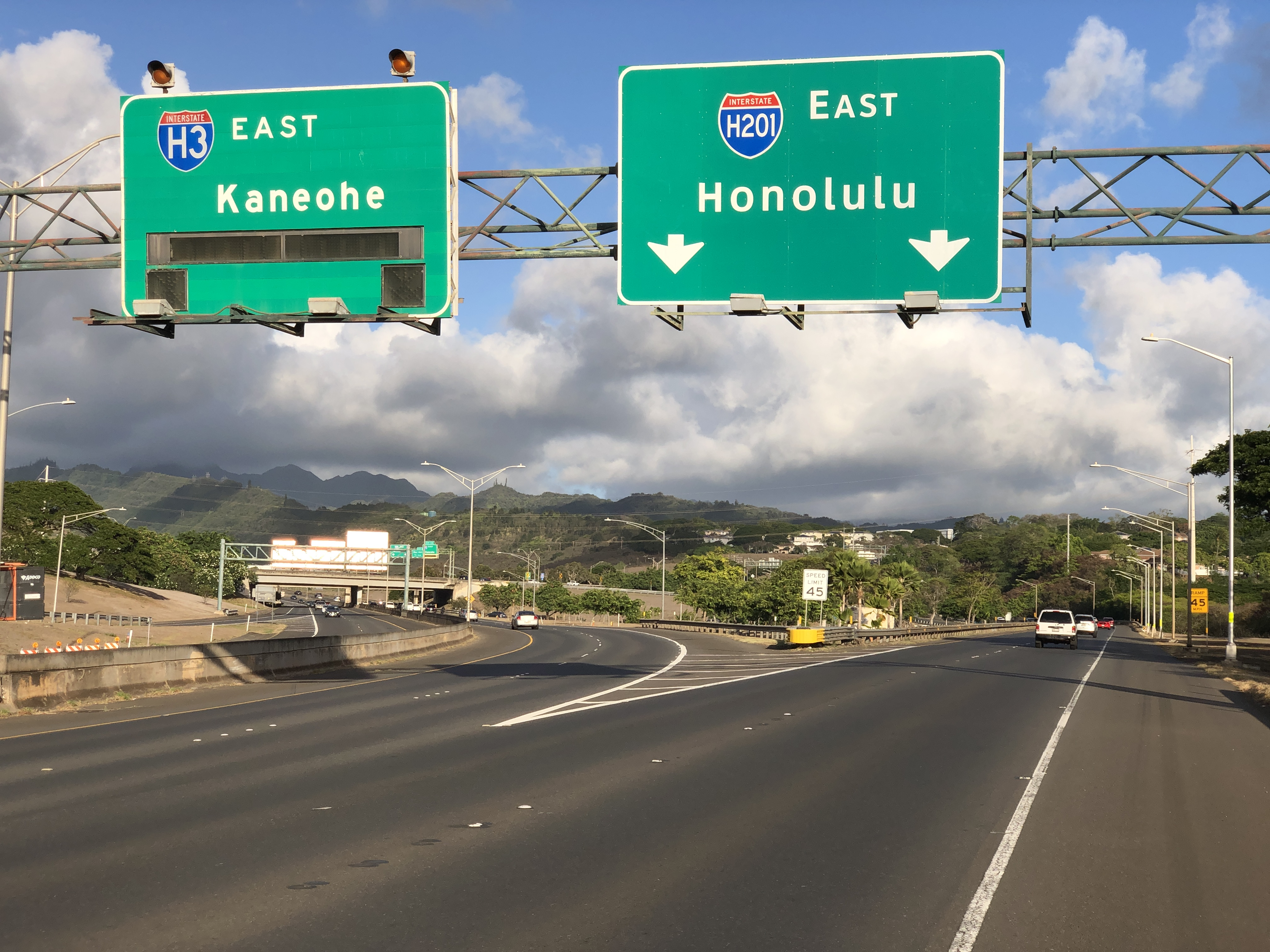
H-3 eastbound at the exit for H-201 east

Kānaka Maoli (Native Hawaiian) cultural practitioners continue to call for the highway's removal since it runs through an area of extreme cultural significance. The Bishop Museum, which did the historical and archeological research, has published extensive reports that generally ascribe lower cultural significance to these sites relative to other sites in Hawaii. Many contend that the freeway is "cursed" due to its destruction of religious sites and is therefore harmful even to those who traverse it.

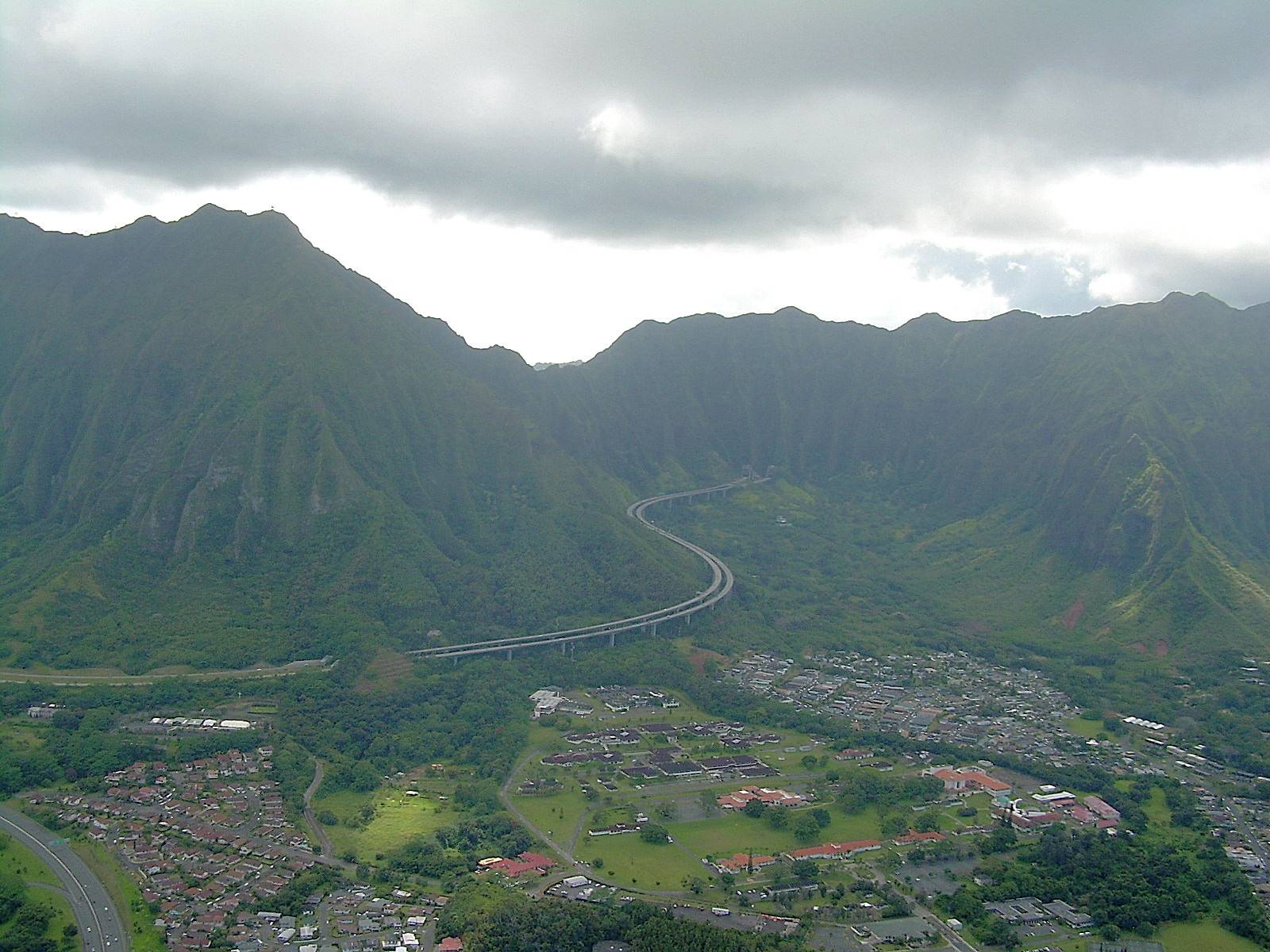
Aerial view of the tunnel's eastern entrance

Ongoing environmental concerns include weed encroachment, light pollution, asbestos pollution, water and streamlife problems, and a host of other concerns; among these are the ongoing decline of native owls called pueo and other native birds. For example, the Oʻahu ʻalauahio (Paroreomyza maculata), whose last known home was Halawa, has had no sightings since H-3 construction was completed.

In September 2020, a section of the H-3 freeway (the Tetsuo Harano Tunnel) was closed for two days to serve as a COVID-19 surge testing site for up to 10,000 people. The freeway was selected to allow for long queuing lanes leading up to testing stations at the Kaneohe and Halawa tunnel portals.

== Exit list ==
The entire route is in Honolulu County.

Location	mi	km	Exit	Destinations	Notes
Aiea	0.00	0.00	—	H-1 east – Joint Base Pearl Harbor–Hickam, Airport	Exit 13 on H-1
Aiea	0.00	0.00	1A	H-1 west – Pearl City	Westbound exit and eastbound entrance
Aiea	0.13	0.21	1B	H-201 east – Honolulu	No westbound entrance; no number designation on eastbound exit; exit 1C on H-201
Aiea	0.51	0.82	1C	Stadium, Camp Smith, Halawa, Aiea	Westbound exit only; access via Route 7241
Ko'olau Range			Tetsuo Harano Tunnels, Hospital Rock Tunnels		
Kaneohe	8.23	13.24	9	Route 63 north (Likelike Highway)	Eastbound exit and westbound entrance
Kaneohe	9.91	15.95	11	Route 83 (Kamehameha Highway) – Kaneohe, North Shore	
Kaneohe	12.30	19.79	14	Route 630 – Kailua	Eastbound exit and westbound entrance; signed as Route 65
Kaneohe	13.83	22.26	15	Kaneohe Bay Drive	
Kaneohe	13.83	22.26	–	Kaneohe MCBH	Continuation beyond Kaneohe Bay Drive
1.000 mi = 1.609 km; 1.000 km = 0.621 mi: Incomplete access
