= Hawaii Route 64 =

State highway in Honolulu County, Hawaii, United States

Hawaii Route 64
- Sand Island Parkway
- Route 64 highlighted in red

Route information
- Maintained by HDOT
- Length: 2.6 mi (4.2 km)

Major junctions
- South end: Entrance to Sand Island State Recreation Area
- North end: Route 92 in Honolulu

Location
- Country: United States
- State: Hawaii

Highway system
- Routes in Hawaii
← Route 63	→ Route 65

Route 64 is a three-mile (5 km) road that stretches from Nimitz Highway (Hawaii Route 92) to the entrance of Sand Island State Recreation Area west of downtown Honolulu. The route also goes by the street name as Sand Island Parkway. The route gives access to Sand Island State Recreation Area and the U.S. Coast Guard Honolulu Branch by crossing the Kapalama Channel.

== Route description ==
Route 64 begins on Sand Island, traveling northwest through the center of the island before crossing the Kapalama Channel. Once on mainland O'ahu, Route 64 continues northwesterly before bending, where the designation of the road changes from Sand Island Parkway to Sand Island Access Road, and intersects Nimitz Highway.

== Major intersections ==
The entire route is in Honolulu.

mi	km	Destinations	Notes
0	0.0	Entrance to Sand Island State Recreation Area	
2.6	4.2	Route 92 (Nimitz Highway)	
1.000 mi = 1.609 km; 1.000 km = 0.621 mi
