= Alika DeRego =

American volleyball player (born 1986)

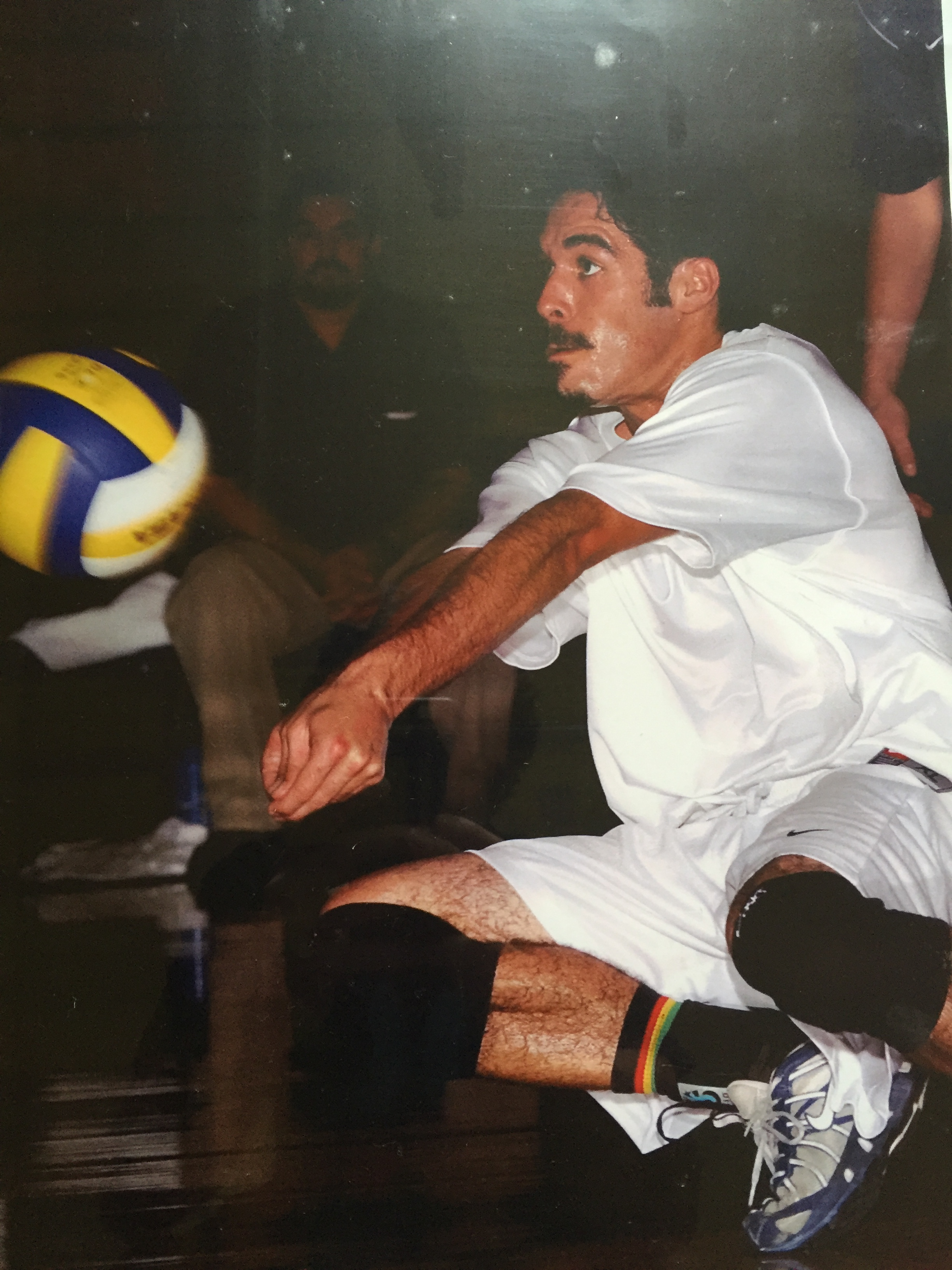

Personal information
- Full name: Alika Joseph Kaleiali'i DeRego
- Born: Kaneohe, Hawaii, United States
- Education: California State University Long Beach Orange Coast College
- Height: 5 ft 8 in (1.73 m)

Volleyball information
- Position: Libero
- Current club: (Hawaii)
- Number: 8

Career
- Years: Team
- 2006–07 2011-12 2015-16 2019: (United States) Orange Coast College (United States) Creole Volleyball Club (Hawaii) Kailua Volleyball Club (United States) Rukkus Volleyball Club
Medal record
Men's volleyball
USA Volleyball Open National Championships
Gold medal – first place	2011 Dallas	Indoor
Silver medal – second place	2019 Columbus	Indoor

Alika Joseph Kaleiali'i DeRego (born September 7, 1986) is an American men's volleyball player who won the 2011 USA Volleyball Open National Championship gold medal with Creole Volleyball Club from the Garden Empire Volleyball Association Region (GEVA). As a libero, he has played for Creole Volleyball Club from Brooklyn, New York in the 2011 and 2012 US Open of Volleyball National Championships, helping Creole to the Gold Medal in the Men's Open Division at the 2011 USA Volleyball Open Championships in Dallas, TX, earning all-tournament team honors.

== Career ==
=== High school ===
DeRego lettered four years in volleyball at James B. Castle High School in Kaneohe, Hawaii as an Outside Hitter and Setter. He was a two-time Honolulu Star-Bulletin and Honolulu Advertiser All-State team selection and led his team to a Oahu Interscholastic Association (OIA) Eastern Division Title. Twice voted James B. Castle High School Most Valuable Player and Team Captain award for the Knights. He was the OIA League Player of the Year and named a Oahu Interscholastic Association (OIA) All-League selection for three straight years.

=== College ===
During DeRego's Orange Coast College career he helped the Pirates win a Pacific Coast Athletic Conference title, and reach the Final Four of the California Community College Athletic Association CCCAA Men’s Volleyball State Championship. He was a two-time Pacific Coast All-Conference team selection and a two-time Orange Coast College Scholar-Athlete honoree. DeRego ranks second in career digs and fourth in single-season digs in Orange Coast College history. Voted the Orange Coast College Men’s Freshman of the Year award winner. Won a Bronze Medal at the USA Volleyball Junior Beach National Championships (U20) Open Division. DeRego later transferred to California State University, Long Beach.

He graduated from Orange Coast College with an AA degree in Liberal Arts. DeRego then graduated from California State University, Long Beach with a BA degree in Psychology.

=== Club ===
DeRego played for Creole Volleyball Club from Brooklyn, New York from the Garden Empire Volleyball Association Region (GEVA) during the 2011 and 2012 seasons. DeRego helped Creole VBC to the 2011 82nd Annual USA Volleyball Open National Championship Gold Medal, Men's Open (Gold Division) in Dallas, Texas, earning all-tournament team honors. In 2012 he again helped Creole VBC to the US Open (Silver Division) Championship in Salt Lake City, Utah. DeRego played for Rukkus Volleyball Club from the Southern California Region (SC), helping the team to the 2019 90th Annual USA Volleyball Open National Championship Silver Medal, Men’s Open (Gold Division) in Columbus, Ohio.

In 2015, DeRego played for Kailua Volleyball Club from Kailua, Hawaii from the Aloha Volleyball Region (AH), helping the team capture the 2015 58th Annual Haili Volleyball Tournament, Men's Open Division Championship, in Hilo, Hawaii, earning all-tournament team honors. In 2016 he again helped Kailua VBC to a 2nd-place finish in the 59th Annual Haili Volleyball Tournament, Men's Open Division Championship.

== Personal ==
DeRego was born in Honolulu, Hawaii. He graduated from California State University, Long Beach with a bachelor's degree (BA) in Psychology. He then earned his master’s degree (MA), in Coaching and Athletic Administration, from Concordia University, Irvine
