= Carlos Diaz (pitcher) =

American baseball player (1958–2015)

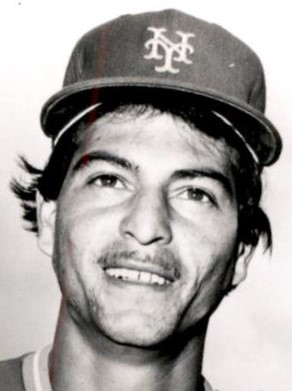
- Diaz with the New York Mets
- Relief Pitcher
- Born: January 7, 1958; Kaneohe, Hawaii, U.S.
- Died: September 28, 2015 (aged 57); Kailua, Hawaii, U.S.
- Batted: Right Threw: Left

MLB debut
- June 30, 1982, for the Atlanta Braves

Last MLB appearance
- July 26, 1986, for the Los Angeles Dodgers

MLB statistics
- Win–loss record: 13–6
- Earned run average: 3.21
- Strikeouts: 207
- Stats at Baseball Reference

Teams
- Atlanta Braves (1982); New York Mets (1982–1983); Los Angeles Dodgers (1984–1986)

Carlos Antonio Diaz (January 7, 1958 – September 28, 2015) was an American professional baseball relief pitcher. He played in Major League Baseball (MLB) for the Atlanta Braves, New York Mets, and Los Angeles Dodgers from 1982 to 1986.

== Early life and career ==
Born in Kaneohe, Hawaii, Diaz attended James B. Castle High School and was the thirteenth native Hawaiian to have played in the major leagues. He was originally drafted out of Allan Hancock College in Santa Maria, California by the Seattle Mariners in the third round of the 1981 Major League Baseball draft but did not sign. Seattle then drafted him again in the first round of the June secondary phase of the 1979 draft, and he then signed with the team. After two seasons in the Mariners' organization, Diaz was traded to the Atlanta Braves for Jeff Burroughs.

Despite a career 4.22 earned run average in the M's farm system, in 1981, he managed to bring that down to a far more respectable 2.81 his first season with the Richmond Braves. He earned a call to the major leagues the following season, and made his major league debut on June 30, 1982 against the Houston Astros. With the Braves trailing 3–1, Diaz entered the game in relief of Phil Niekro in the ninth inning. Diaz gave up one earned run to increase the Astros' lead to 4–1. The Braves, who won the National League West that season, came back to score four runs in the bottom of the inning to give Diaz his first career win.

Diaz went 3–2 with a 4.03 ERA for the Braves in 1982. One of those three wins came against the New York Mets, the team that subsequently acquired him, on September 10, for Tom Hausman.

Diaz had a career year in 1983, his only full season with the Mets. He pitched in a career high 54 games, and had a 3–1 record with two saves and a 2.05 ERA. Following the season, he was traded to the Los Angeles Dodgers with Bob Bailor for Sid Fernandez and Ross Jones.

As Fernandez was from Honolulu, this trade was unique in that it involved two Hawaiians. The trade was initially unpopular with Mets fans, however, it turned out to favor the Mets in the end, as Fernandez went on to be a staple of the Mets rotation for ten years. Diaz, meanwhile, lasted only two and a half seasons with the Dodgers before injuries cut short his career. He signed with the Oakland Athletics following the 1986 season, but was cut during spring training in 1987.

Diaz had a perfect career fielding percentage until the 12th inning of a 14-inning marathon against the San Diego Padres on June 21, 1986. He misplayed a Tim Flannery ground ball for his only career error.

== Death ==
Diaz died on September 28, 2015, in Kailua, Honolulu County, Hawaii. The cause of death was reportedly a heart attack.
