= Olomana (mountain) =

Mountain on Oʻahu, Hawaiʻi

Mount Olomana
- Three Peaks
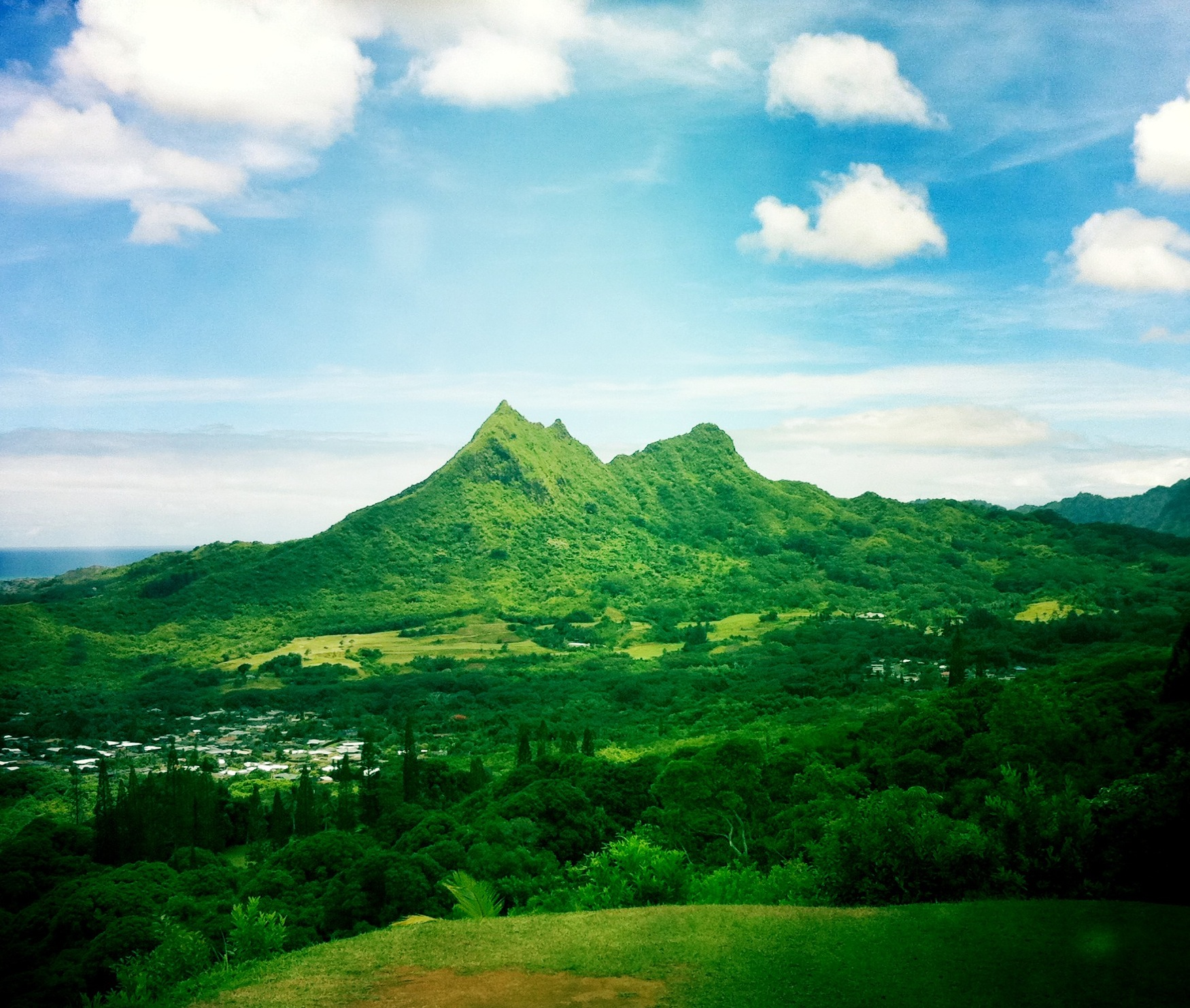
- View of the three peaks from Nu‘uanu Pali

Highest point
- Elevation: 1,643 ft (501 m)
- Coordinates: 21°21′51.00″N 157°45′13.00″W

Naming
- English translation: "Divided Hill"
- Language of name: Hawaiian

Geography
- Location within Oahu Location within Hawaii
- Location: Windward Oahu, Honolulu County, Hawaii

Geology
- Volcanic zone: Hawaii hotspot

Climbing
- Easiest route: Hike

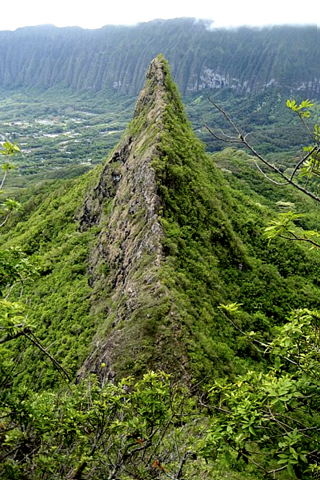
Olomana's third peak "Ahiki" from the top of the second, "Paku'i"

Olomana is a set of three mountainous peaks on the windward side of Oahu near Kailua and Waimanalo. While historically only the first peak was called Olomana and the second and third Paku'i and Ahiki (the least pointed peak) respectively, most people call the entire section Olomana. Geologically speaking, Olomana is an erosional remnant from within the caldera of the Koʻolau Volcano.

== Legend ==
In Hawaiian, Olomana means, "divided hill". According to ancient Hawaiian legend, Olomana was a giant warrior who ruled the lands on the Windward side of Oahu from Kualoa to Makapu'u. During this time ʻAhuapau, the king of Oahu sent the great warrior Palila to battle Olomana, subsequently cutting Olomana in half. His upper torso was said to be in the Pacific Ocean near Kāneʻohe Bay leaving his lower half where Mount Olomana is today. According to the legend of Makalei, the peak Ahiki was named for one of Chief Olomana's favorite konohiki (headman), and the peak Pakuʻi was named for the keeper of Kaʻelepulu fishponds.

== Hiking trail ==
The hike to the highest first peak is steep but not dangerous. There is a short climb required at the top with a rope in place to use, to reach the summit with excellent views all around. Those who hike to the second peak are taking more of a risk and there have been accidents and helicopter rescues from this segment of the trail. The third peak is accessed on an extremely narrow crumbly ridge with a long unforgiving drop on both sides, and is rated advanced.

Hiking Olomana can be hazardous, especially in wet conditions between the second and third peak, and even highly fit and experienced hikers have fallen to their deaths on this part of the trail. On the same day in 2004, two hikers separately fell but survived. In April 2011, 44-year-old Ryan Suenaga, an experienced hiker, was killed when he fell from the ridge approaching the third peak, and in January 2014, 27-year-old Honolulu fireman Mitchell Kai fell to his death along the same section. In June 2015, a 52-year-old retired Navy man fell approximately 200 feet to his death. On April 1, 2018, a man was found 400 feet below the hiking trail. He was transferred by helicopter to a nearby park, where he was pronounced dead. Helicopter rescues are costly for the local fire department. In late 2022, soon after the second death on the trail that year, a warning sign listing the six deaths since 2011 was posted at the trailhead.
