= Aloha Dalire =

American hula dancer

Fabianne Pomaialoha Wong Dalire, known professionally as Aloha Dalire, (June 22, 1950 – August 6, 2014) was an American Hawaiian kumu hula, or master hula teacher. She won the first Miss Aloha Hula as Aloha Wong, in 1971, the same year that the Merrie Monarch Festival was established. The Miss Aloha Hula title is hula's top solo wahine (women's) honor.

Dalire Wong was born on June 22, 1950, in Honolulu and raised in Kaneohe, Hawaii. She began studying hula dancing when she was just three years old under kumu hula master, George Naʻope. Her mother, Mary Keolalaulani McCabe Wong, founded Keolalaulani Halau 'Olapa O Laka, a hula school, in 1963. Aloha Dalire would later become the director of her mother's halau.

Dalire won the first Miss Hula title, later known as Miss Aloha Hula, in 1971 under her maiden name, Aloha Wong. She pursued a career as a hula teacher, ultimately becoming a kumu hula, or hula master. She remained deeply involved with the Merrie Monarch Festival. She regularly entered her halau (hula school), Keolalaulani Halau 'Olapa O Laka, in the festival's competition for more than four decades. Her halau students often won or placed in the women's kahiko and auana categories at the festival. In 2013, Dalire's wahine won the hula auana, or modern hula competition. Dalire's three daughters also won the Miss Aloha Hula title: Kapualokeokalaniakea in 1991, Kau'imaiokalaniakea in 1992, and Keolalaulani in 1999. One of her granddaughters, "Kili" Lai, placed first runner-up at the Miss Aloha Hula competition in 2014.

== Death ==
Aloha Dalire died at her home in Kaneohe, Hawaii, during the early morning of August 6, 2014, at the age of 64. She had recently returned from a hula competition in Japan on August 1. She was survived by her three daughters and sixteen grandchildren. Thousands of people attended her funeral service at the Hawaiian Memorial Park Mortuary in Kaneohe on August 20, 2014. The service included hula dancers and music performed by Robert Cazimero and Jerry Santos. Her funeral procession through Kaneohe included stops at her first hula halau on Kamehameha Highway (now owned by her oldest daughter, Kapua Dalire-Moe) and her hula studio on Kahuhipa Street.
