= Koʻolau Range =

Mountain range in Oahu, Hawaii, US

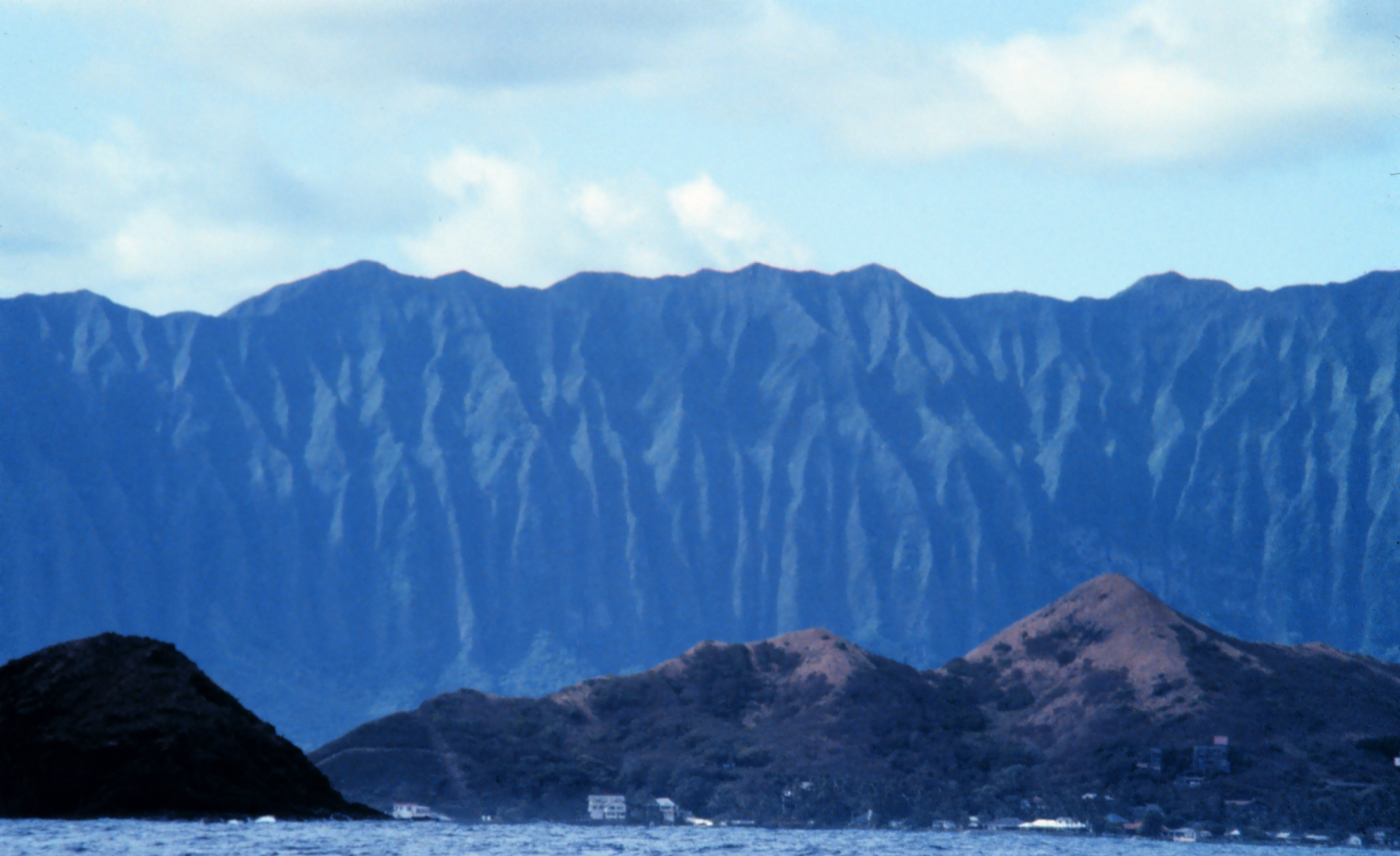
- View of Koʻolau Range from offshore Lanikai (windward coast)

Highest point
- Peak: Kōnāhuanui
- Elevation: 3,150 ft (960 m)
- Prominence: 2,303 ft (702 m)
- Coordinates: 21°27′0″N 157°54′0″W

Geography
- Location within Hawaii
- Location: Oahu, Hawaii, US
- Parent range: Hawaiian Islands
- Topo map: USGS Kilohana (HI)

Geology
- Rock age: 1.7 Ma
- Mountain type: Dormant shield volcano
- Volcanic zone: Hawaiian-Emperor seamount chain
- Last eruption: 32,000 - 10,000 BP

Climbing
- Easiest route: trail

U.S. National Natural Landmark
- Designated: 1972

Koʻolau Range (koʻolau means "windward" in Hawaiian (Note: It's a cognate of the toponym Tokelau.)) is the dormant fragmented remnant of the eastern or windward shield volcano of the Hawaiian island of Oʻahu. It was designated a National Natural Landmark in 1972.

== Geology ==
It is not a mountain range in the proper sense, because it was formed as a single mountain called Koʻolau Volcano. What remains of Koʻolau is the western half of the original volcano that was destroyed in prehistoric times when the entire eastern half—including much of the summit caldera—slid cataclysmically into the Pacific Ocean. Remains of this ancient volcano lie as massive fragments strewn nearly 100 miles (160 km) over the ocean floor to the northeast of Oʻahu. Kāneʻohe Bay is what remains of the ancient volcano's summit caldera after the slide. The modern Koʻolau mountain forms Oʻahu's windward coast and rises behind the leeward coast city of Honolulu — on its leeward slopes and valleys are located most of Honolulu's residential neighborhoods.

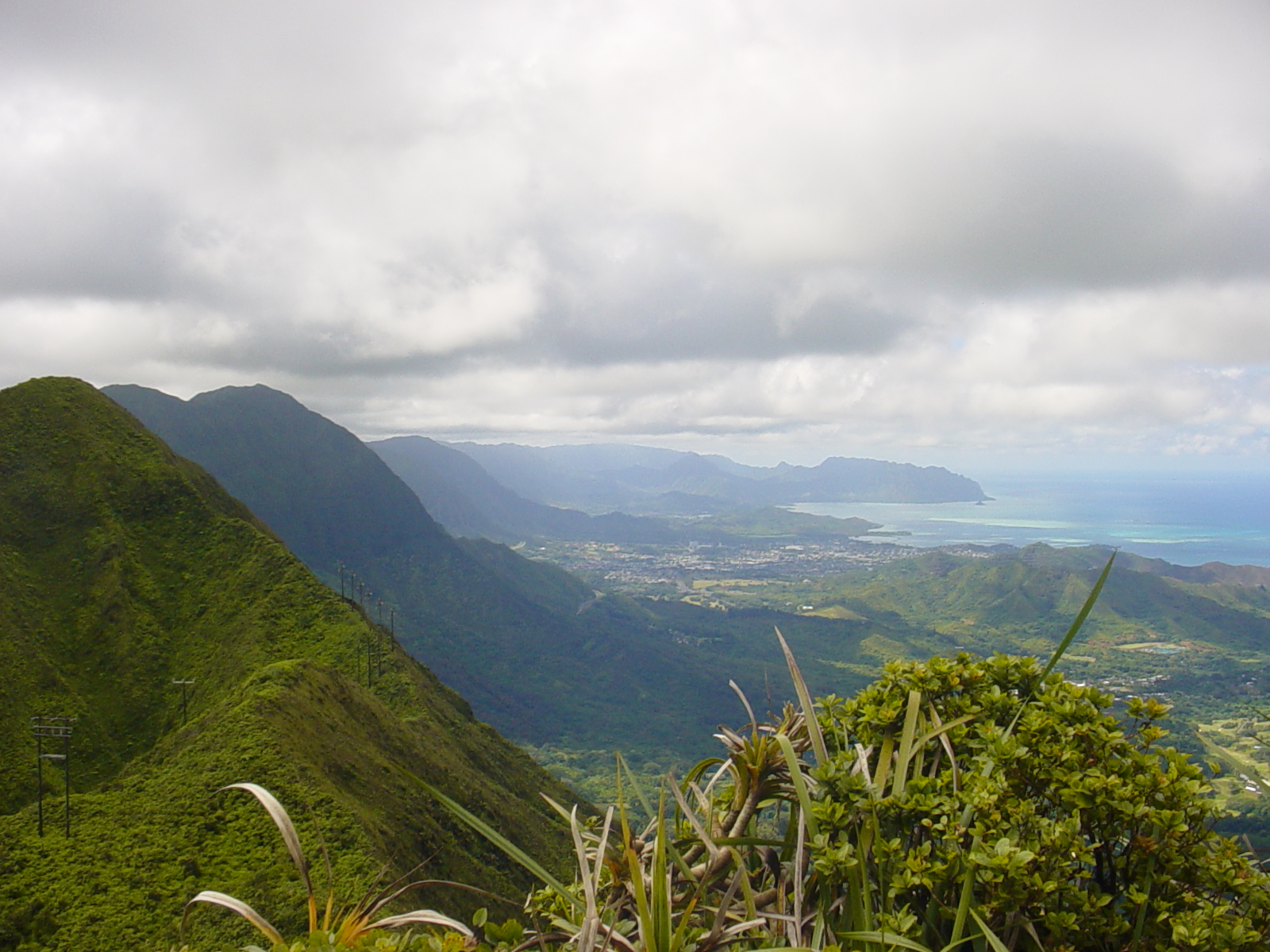
View of Koʻolau Range from the top of the ridge, facing northwest. The large town of Kāneʻohe is visible in the center of the photo, located on the narrow coastal plain paralleling the range.

The volcano is thought to have first erupted on the ocean floor more than 2.5 million years ago. It eventually reached sea level and continued to grow in elevation until about 1.7 million years ago, when the volcano became dormant. The volcano remained dormant for hundreds of thousands of years, during which time erosion ate away at the initially smooth slopes of the shield-shaped mountain; and the entire body subsided considerably. The highest elevation perhaps exceeded 3,000 meters (9,800 ft); today, the summit of the tallest peak, Puʻu Kōnāhuanui is only 945 meters (3,100 ft).

=== Honolulu Volcanics ===
After hundreds of thousands of years of dormancy, Koʻolau volcano began to erupt again. Some thirty eruptions over the past 500,000 years or so have created many of the landmarks around eastern Oʻahu, such as Diamond Head, Koko Head (Hanauma Bay), Koko Crater, Punchbowl Crater, Tantalus, and Āliapaʻakai, and are collectively known as the Honolulu Volcanic Series, or simply Honolulu Volcanics. According to the US Geological Survey, the most recent eruptions in this series of activity occurred between about 70,000 to 100,000 years ago. There is a possibility that Koʻolau volcano could erupt again; however, the chance of such an eruption occurring in "our lifetimes, or even those of many future generations" is remote.

== History ==
In 1795, the newly-formed Hawaiian Kingdom conducted a battle resulting in the triumphant conquest of O'ahu on the range within part of the Nu‘uanu Pali Lookout, under the command of Kamehameha the Great, as his troops forced all of the warriors up the valley to fall to their deaths below the cliffs.

The Ko‘olau Range was designated in 1972 as a National Natural Landmark.

== Transportation ==
There are three roads that tunnel through the southern part of the Koʻolau Range, connecting Honolulu to the Windward Coast. From leeward to windward:

- Hawaii Route 61 (Pali Highway)
- Hawaii Route 63 (Likelike Highway)
- Interstate H-3

== Gallery ==
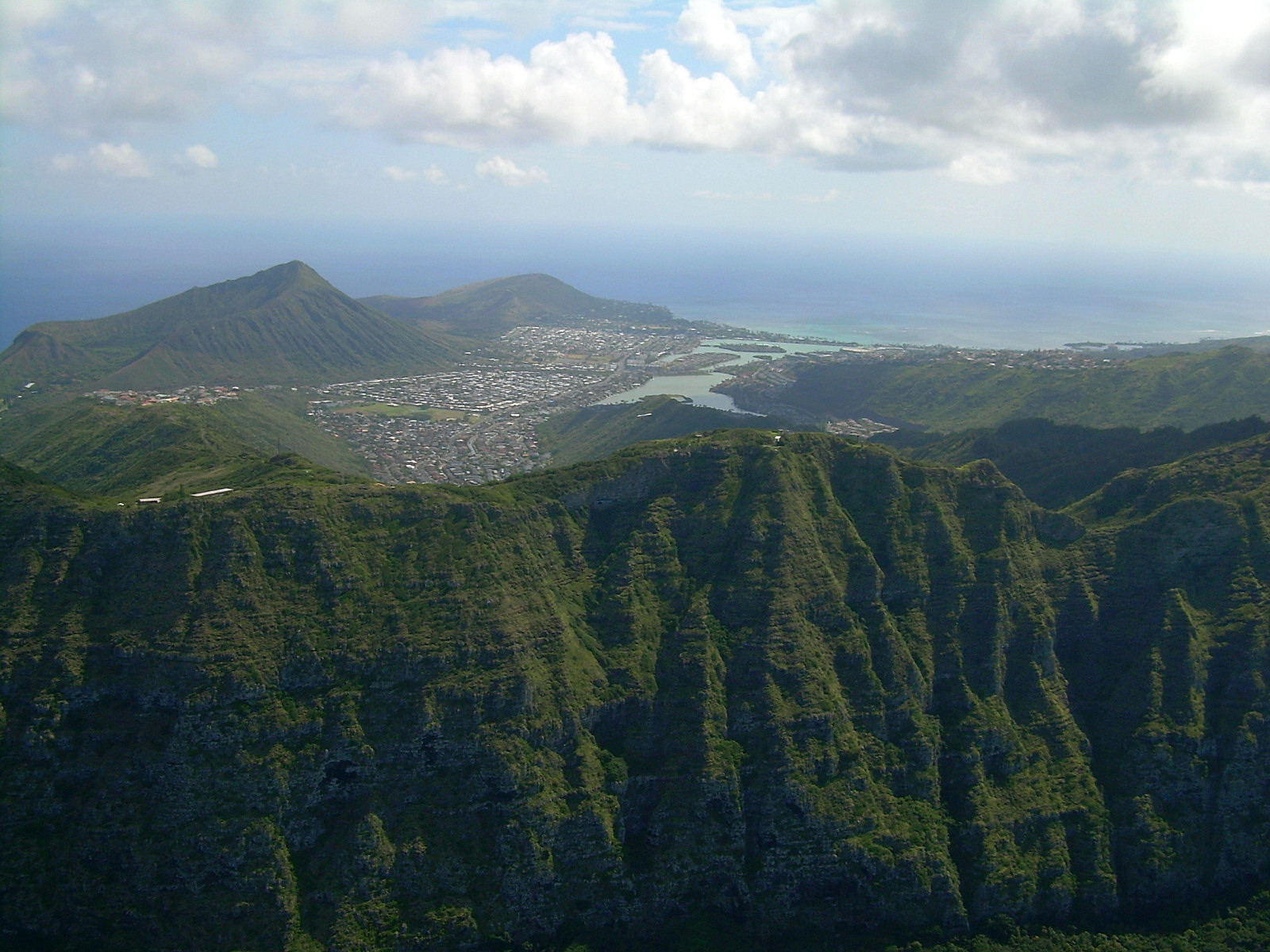
View of Koʻolau Range with Koko Crater and Maunalua (Hawaii Kai) visible.

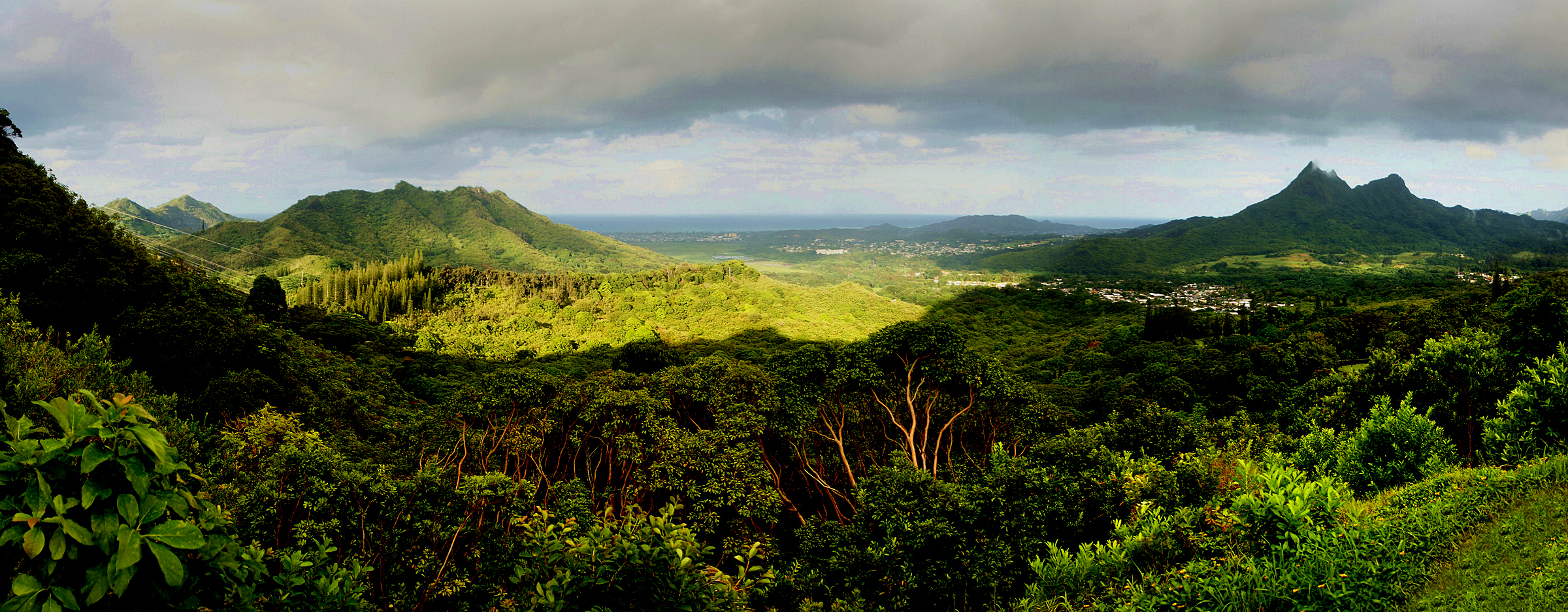
Nuʻuanu Pali, a section of the Koʻolau Range. Olomana is visible on the right side of the image.

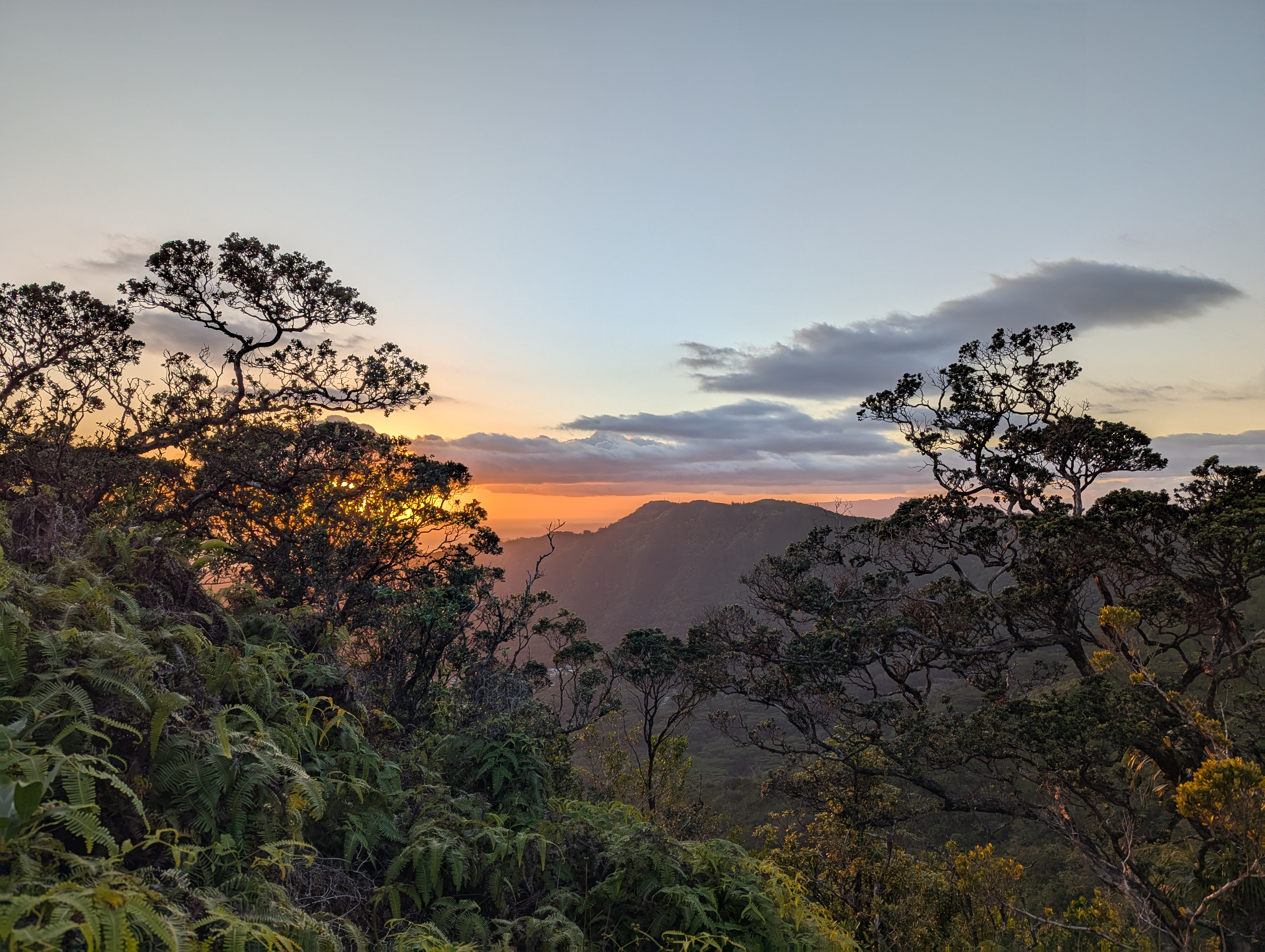
Sunset from Awawaloa

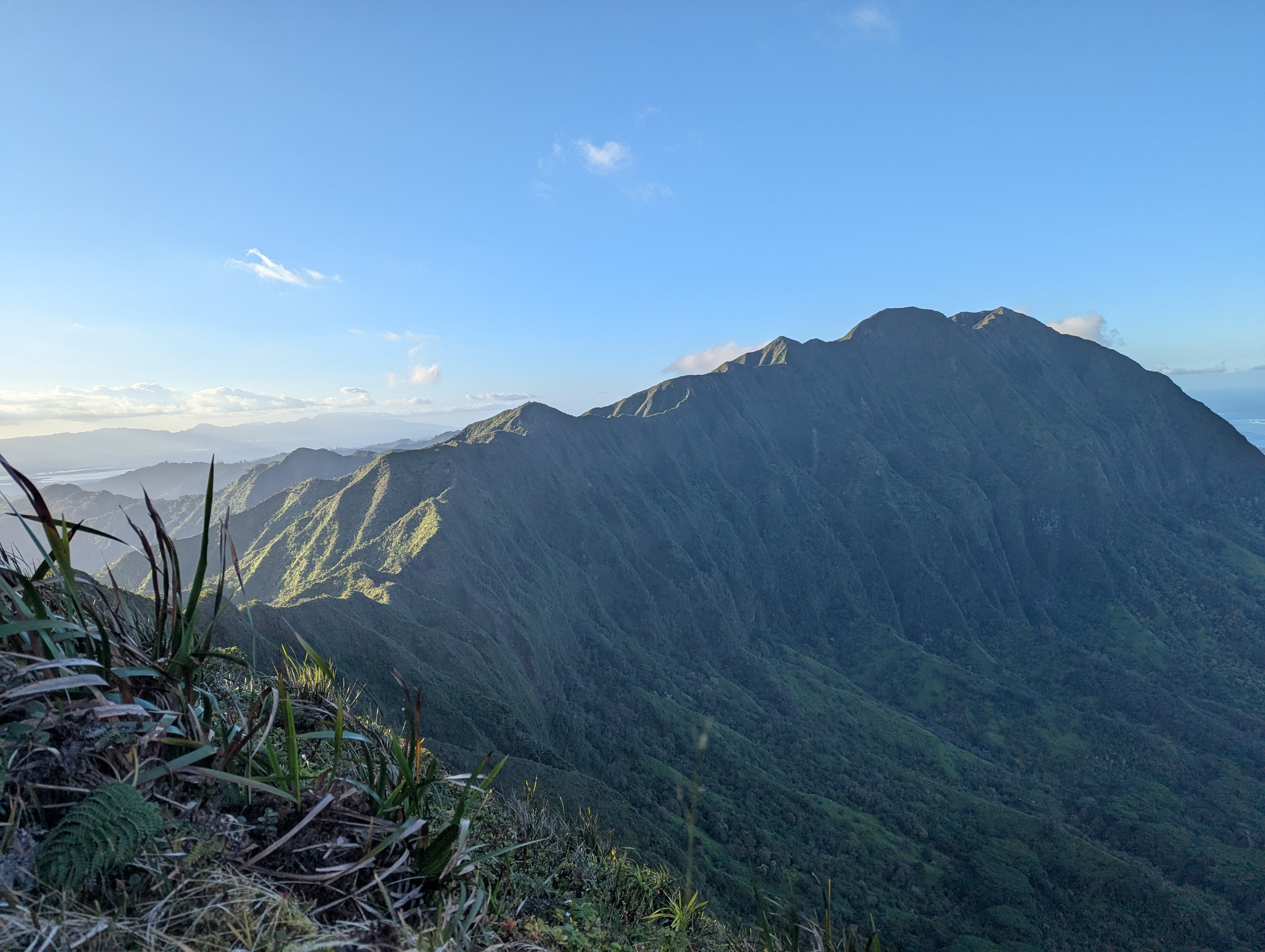
View of Konahuanui from near the summit of Awawaloa (view as a 360° interactive panorama)
