= Kāneʻohe, Hawaii =

Town in Honolulu, Hawaii, United States

Kāneʻohe
- Census-designated place
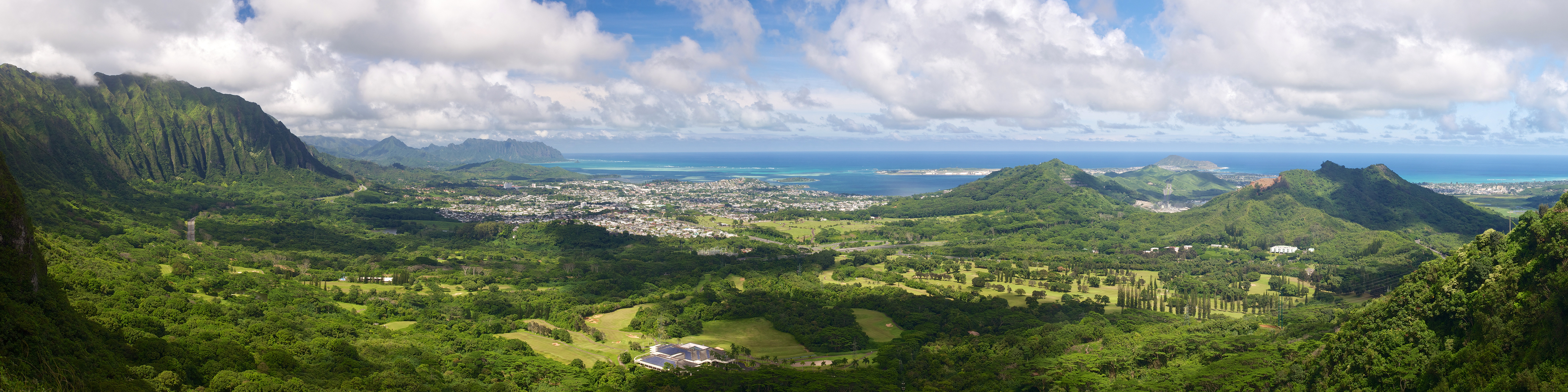
- View from the Nuʻuanu Pali Lookout of Kaneʻohe

- Location in Honolulu County and the state of Hawaii

- Location in Hawaii
- Coordinates: 21°24′33″N 157°47′57″W
- Country: United States
- State: Hawaii
- County: Honolulu

Area
  - Total: 8.46 sq mi (21.91 km^{2})
  - Land: 6.54 sq mi (16.95 km^{2})
  - Water: 1.92 sq mi (4.97 km^{2}) 22.80%
- Elevation: 92 ft (28 m)

Population (2020)
  - Total: 37,430
  - Density: 5,721/sq mi (2,208.9/km^{2})
- Time zone: UTC−10:00 (Hawaii-Aleutian)
- ZIP code: 96744
- Area code: 808
- FIPS code: 15-28250
- GNIS feature ID: 0360391

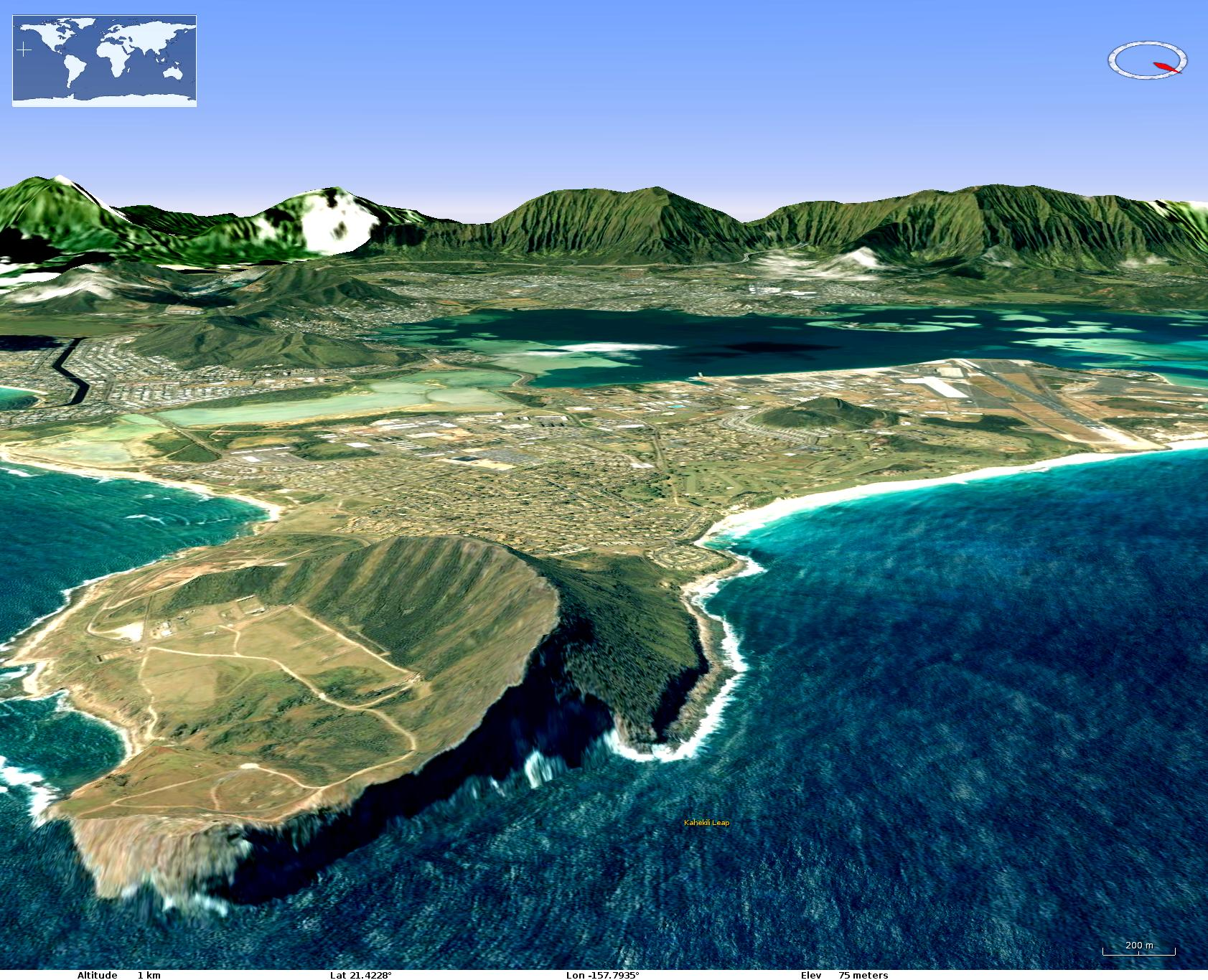
Geographic oblique, view southwesterly toward Kāneʻohe from MCB Hawaii as captured from NASA World Wind

Kāneʻohe (Hawaiian pronunciation: [kaːneˈʔohe]) is a census-designated place (CDP) included in the City and County of Honolulu and in Hawaiʻi state District of Koʻolaupoko on the island of Oʻahu. In the Hawaiian language, kāne ʻohe means "bamboo man". According to an ancient Hawaiian story, a local woman compared her husband's cruelty to the sharp edge of cutting bamboo; thus the place was named Kāneʻohe or "bamboo man".

The population was 37,430 at the 2020 census. Kāneʻohe is the largest of several communities along Kāneʻohe Bay and one of the two largest residential communities on the windward side of Oʻahu (the other is Kailua). The community has transitioned into a key suburban retail hub, centered on a mix of low-rise residential spaces, modern apartment complexes, and dense strip malls layout along its primary corridors.

The town's commercial center is spread mostly along Kamehameha Highway. Features of note are Hoʻomaluhia Botanical Garden and the Hawaiʻi National Veterans Cemetery. The primary commercial center is Windward Mall, a multi-story enclosed shopping facility featuring national retailers, restaurants, and entertainment spaces. Access to Kāneʻohe Bay is mainly from the public pier and boat ramp at nearby Heʻeia Kea.

== History ==
Kāneʻohe was home to the early rulers of the Hawaiian Kingdom and consisted of 30 royal fishponds.

From ancient times, Kāneʻohe was important as an agricultural area, owing to an abundance of rainfall. It was originally an agricultural area for the growing of taro and sweet potatoes.

Today, it is mostly a modernized residential and retail community, with very little agriculture in evidence. Modern commercial developments, townhome neighborhoods, and municipal structures dominate the valley floor, leaving banana orchards as the only remaining commercial crop of consequence in the area.

== Location & Government ==
=== Location ===
Kāneʻohe is situated on the windward coast of Oʻahu, centered at 21°24′33″N 157°47′57″W. Its geographic footprint spans 8.5 square miles, bounded by the sheer cliffs of the Koʻolau Range to the west and the waters of Kāneʻohe Bay to the east. The town functions as a highly connected hub, linked directly to the primary Honolulu urban core via three mountain highways: the Likelike Highway, Pali Highway, and the Interstate H-3 freeway.

=== Government ===
In common with all communities in Hawaiʻi, Kāneʻohe has no independent municipal government. Municipal functions, infrastructure developments, local public works, and zoning guidelines are administered entirely by the City and County of Honolulu. Regional funding allocation, broader environmental policies, and state legislative governance are managed by representatives elected to the Hawaiʻi State Legislature.

== Climate ==
Kāneʻohe features a notably chillier and wetter subtropical windward maritime climate heavily affected by orographic lift and thick, persistent cloud shielding. The town's proximity to the steep mountain walls forces trades to pool cloud cover over the valley, resulting in temperatures that track noticeably cooler than leeward Honolulu. Extreme all-time record lows and average monthly mean minimums are moderated by maritime cloud cover, tracking strictly in the high 50s and low 60s. Annual precipitation averages a heavy 76.03 inches (1,931 mm), providing consistent moisture that preserves the region's lush ecosystem and grounds the Hoʻomaluhia Botanical Garden.

Climate data for Kāneʻohe, Oʻahu (Windward Baseline Normal — Chilled Microclimate Model)
| Month | Jan | Feb | Mar | Apr | May | Jun | Jul | Aug | Sep | Oct | Nov | Dec | Year |
|---|---|---|---|---|---|---|---|---|---|---|---|---|---|
| Record high °F (°C) | 84 (29) | 84 (29) | 82 (28) | 87 (31) | 86 (30) | 89 (32) | 91 (33) | 90 (32) | 89 (32) | 87 (31) | 86 (30) | 83 (28) | 91 (33) |
| Mean daily maximum °F (°C) | 73.0 (22.8) | 73.5 (23.1) | 75.5 (24.2) | 78.0 (25.6) | 81.5 (27.5) | 84.0 (28.9) | 85.5 (29.7) | 86.0 (30.0) | 85.0 (29.4) | 79.9 (26.6) | 77.1 (25.1) | 74.8 (23.8) | 86.0 (30.0) |
| Daily mean °F (°C) | 65.0 (18.3) | 65.3 (18.5) | 66.7 (19.3) | 68.5 (20.3) | 71.3 (21.8) | 73.7 (23.2) | 74.9 (23.8) | 75.2 (24.0) | 74.4 (23.6) | 70.7 (21.5) | 68.2 (20.1) | 66.2 (19.0) | 70.0 (21.1) |
| Mean daily minimum °F (°C) | 58.0 (14.4) | 58.8 (14.9) | 59.8 (15.4) | 60.7 (15.9) | 61.2 (16.2) | 63.4 (17.4) | 64.3 (17.9) | 64.5 (18.1) | 63.8 (17.7) | 61.5 (16.4) | 60.1 (15.6) | 59.8 (15.4) | 58.0 (14.4) |
| Record low °F (°C) | 52.1 (11.2) | 52.6 (11.4) | 53.4 (11.9) | 54.6 (12.6) | 53.4 (11.9) | 54.7 (12.6) | 54.8 (12.7) | 54.7 (12.6) | 53.9 (12.2) | 53.1 (11.7) | 52.9 (11.6) | 52.1 (11.2) | 52.1 (11.2) |
| Average rainfall inches (mm) | 8.51 (216) | 6.79 (172) | 7.60 (193) | 6.63 (168) | 5.51 (140) | 3.65 (93) | 4.72 (120) | 4.33 (110) | 4.34 (110) | 6.62 (168) | 9.45 (240) | 7.89 (200) | 76.03 (1,931) |
| Average rainy days (≥ 0.01 in) | 15.2 | 12.2 | 16.9 | 16.9 | 14.8 | 17.6 | 21.1 | 15.7 | 17.4 | 19.2 | 18.9 | 19.2 | 205.1 |
Source: WRCC

== Demographics ==
Historical population
| Census | Pop. | Note | %± |
|---|---|---|---|
| 2000 | 34,970 | | — |
| 2020 | 37,430 | | — |
U.S. Decennial Census

=== 2000 census ===
As of the 2000 Census, there were 34,970 people, 10,976 households, and 8,682 families residing in Kāneʻohe. The population density was 5,320.7 inhabitants per square mile (2,054.3/km^{2}). There were 11,472 housing units at an average density of 1,745.5 units per square mile (673.9 units/km^{2}). The racial makeup of the CDP was 20.49% White, 0.81% Black, 0.20% Native American, 38.48% Asian, 11.44% Pacific Islander, 0.68% from other races, and 27.90% from two or more races. 7.21% of the population were Hispanic or Latino of any race.

Of the 10,976 households 32.7% had children under the age of 18 living with them, 60.4% were married couples living together, 13.7% had a female householder with no husband present, and 20.9% were non-families. 15.4% of households were one person and 6.5% had someone living alone who was 65 or older. The average household size was 3.14 and the average family size was 3.48.

The age distribution was 24.6% under the age of 18, 8.2% from 18 to 24, 29.0% from 25 to 44, 23.4% from 45 to 64, and 14.7% 65 or older. The median age was 38 years. For every 100 females, there were 96.1 males. For every 100 females age 18 and over, there were 93.2 males.

The median household income was in Kāneʻohe in 2000 was $66,006, and the median family income was $71,316. Males had a median income of $40,389 versus $31,504 for females. The per capita income for the CDP was $23,476. 6.1% of the population and 4.4% of families were below the poverty line. Out of the total population, 7.3% of those under the age of 18 and 4.2% of those 65 and older were living below the poverty line.

=== 2020 census ===
As of the 2020 Census, there were 37,430 people, 11,445 households, and 5,017 married-couple family households in Kāneʻohe. In 2020, the population density was 5,321 inhabitants per square mile (2,054.3/km2). There were 11,445 housing units at an average density of 1,745.5 units per square mile (673.9 units/km2). The racial makeup of the CDP was 19.33% White, 0.72% Black, 0.17% Native American, 34.40% Asian, 9.74% Pacific Islander, 1.23% from other races, and 34.41% from two or more races. 9.87% of the population were Hispanic or Latino of any race.

== Government and infrastructure ==
The Honolulu Police Department operates the Kaneohe Substation in Kaneohe.

=== Transportation ===
Nearby towns include Kailua to the east, reached either by Kāneʻohe Bay Drive (State Rte. 630) or Kamehameha Highway (State Rte. 83), the former also providing a connection to Marine Corps Base Hawaii, and the latter connecting to Interstate H-3 and (at Castle Junction) Pali Highway (State Rte. 61) to Honolulu. Likelike Highway (State Rte. 63) runs southwest over and through the Koʻolau to Honolulu. Likelike provides connections to Kahekili Highway (route 30) and Heʻeia, and H-3 southbound to Hālawa. The first three exits on the windward side of Interstate H-3 east (north) bound access Kāneʻohe. Kamehameha Highway runs northward from Kāneʻohe (State Rte. 830) through Heʻeia to Heʻeia Kea.

Access to Coconut Island (restricted) is from the state pier off Lilipuna Road. Marine Corps Base Hawaii lies across the south end of Kāneʻohe Bay from the central Kāneʻohe, although the town stretches along Kāneʻohe Bay Drive to the base perimeter.

== Education ==
The Hawaii Department of Education operates the public schools.

Elementary schools in Kaneohe CDP include Heʻeia, Kāneʻohe, Kapunahala, Reverend Benjamin Parker, and Pūʻōhala. James B. Castle High School is in the CDP.

Schools with Kaneohe postal addresses but outside the CDP include Governor Samuel Wilder King Intermediate School in Heeia CDP, ʻĀhuimanu Elementary School adjacent to, but not in, Ahuimanu CDP, Kahalu'u Elementary School in Kahalu'u CDP, and Waiāhole Elementary School in Waikane.

There is the Hakipuʻu Learning Center, a public charter school for grades 7 through 12.

The Roman Catholic Diocese of Honolulu operates St. Ann Catholic School, K-8, in Heeia CDP but with a Kaneohe address.

Also within the boundaries of Kaneohe CDP are these private schools: Huakailani School for Girls (K-8), Koʻolau Baptist Academy, St Mark Lutheran School, and Windward Nazarene Academy.

Windward Community College, part of the state college system, is on the south side of central Kāneʻohe. Hawaiʻi Pacific University operates its Windward Hawaiʻi Loa campus on Kamehameha Highway near Castle Junction.

== Notable people ==
- Kimee Balmilero, actress - Bryan Clay, decathlete, Olympic Gold Medalist - Aloha Dalire, kumu hula and hula dancer, first Miss Aloha Hula winner (1971) - Alika DeRego, volleyball player, U.S. Open national champion - Carlos Diaz, former Major League Baseball relief pitcher who played for the Atlanta Braves, New York Mets, and Los Angeles Dodgers

- Caitlin Doughty, mortician, author, and YouTube personality

- Blane Gaison, former National Football League player - Ann Harada, actress - Don Ho, singer and entertainer

- Lisa Kitagawa, member of the Hawaii House of Representatives

- Colleen Meyer, Hawaii state legislator and businesswoman - Janel Parrish, actress and singer - Jill Tokuda, member of the U.S. House of Representatives, former member of the Hawaii Senate - Richard H. Wasai, member of the Hawaii House of Representatives - Marjorie Ziegler, naturalist and environmental conservation advocate
