= HJA =

HJA may refer to:

- Air Haïti
- Hodge Jones & Allen
- Honolulu Junior Academy, now the Academy of the Pacific
