= Punahou School =

Private college-prep high school in Honolulu, Hawaii, US

- The center of the seal depicts a hala tree rooted on a spring with kalo on either side. Two night-blooming cereus flowers, which border the campus, are found on the seal's outer ring.

Location
- 1601 Punahou Street; Honolulu, Hawaiʻi 96822; United States

Information
- Type: Private, college-prep, day
- Religious affiliation: Christian (Nondenominational)
- Established: 1841; 185 years ago
- President: Mike Latham 1986
- Faculty: 300+
- Grades: K–12
- Gender: Coeducational
- Enrollment: 3,000+ (approx.)
- Campus type: Urban
- Colors: Buff and Blue
- Athletics conference: Interscholastic League of Honolulu (ILH)
- Team name: "Buffanblu" colloquially "Puns" or "Buff 'n Blue"
- Rivals: Kamehameha, Iolani
- Publication: Literary magazines: Kakela (6–8); Ka Wai Ola (9–12)
- Newspaper: Ka Punahou
- Yearbook: Na ʻOpio (K–8); The Oahuan (9–12)
- Tuition: $34,230 (2026–2027)
- Website: punahou.edu
- Punahou School Campus
- U.S. National Register of Historic Places
- U.S. Historic district
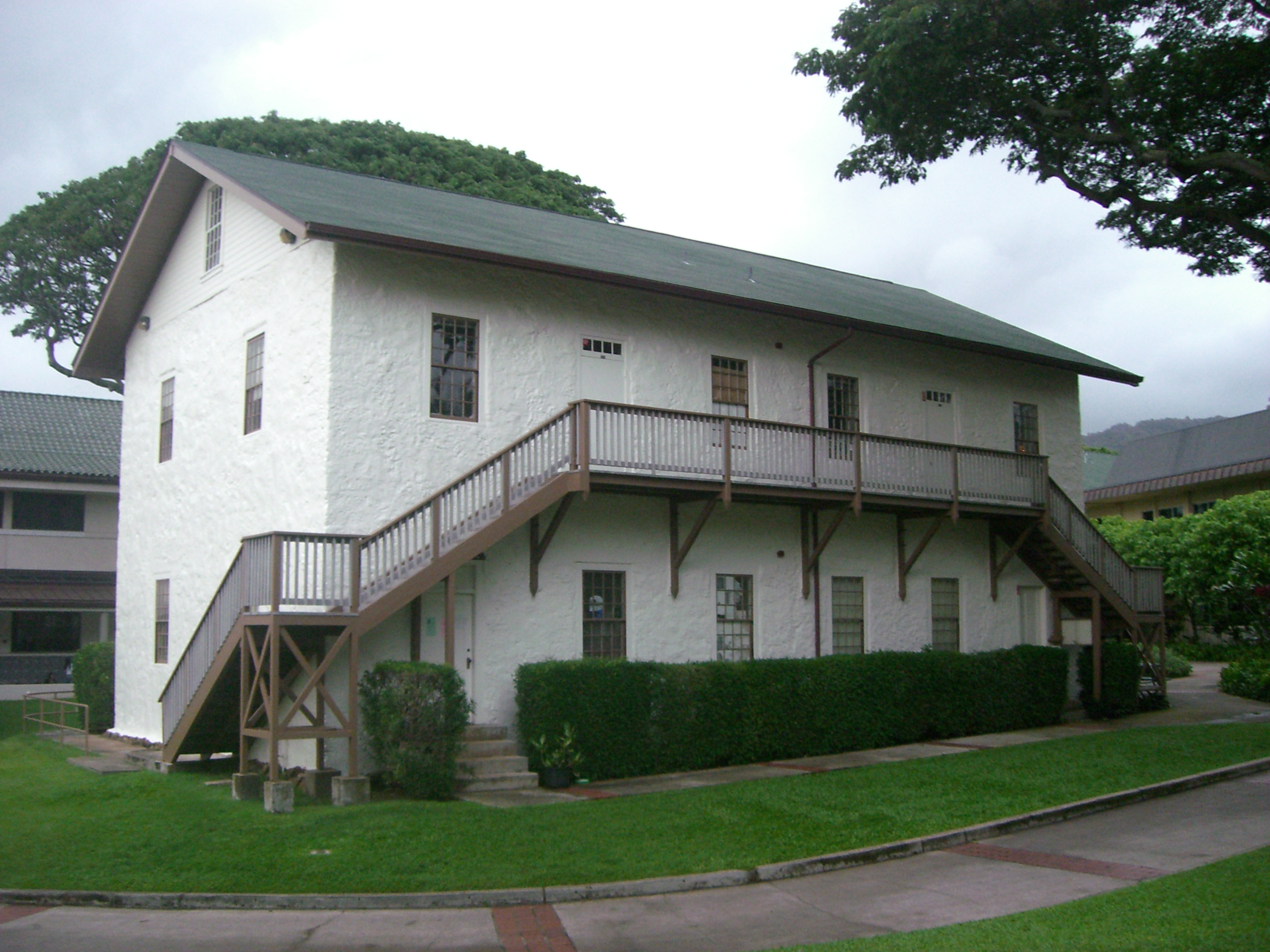
- Old School Hall, built in 1851

- Location within Hawaii
- Coordinates: 21°18′10″N 157°49′48″W
- Built: 1842
- NRHP reference No.: 72000419
- Added to NRHP: August 7, 1972

Punahou School (known as Oahu College until 1934) is a private, co-educational, college preparatory school in Honolulu, Hawaii. More than 3,700 students attend the school from kindergarten through 12th grade. The school was established by Protestant missionaries in 1841.

== History ==
From 1853 to 1934, the school was known as Oahu College.

Punahou has educated members of the Hawaiian royal family, but is not to be confused with the Royal School.

During World War II, the U.S. Army Corps of Engineers commandeered much of the Punahou campus. Castle Hall, formerly the girls' dormitory when Punahou had boarding students, was used as a command center, buildings were connected with tunnels, athletic fields were used as parking lots, and the library was cleared to become sleeping quarters and an officer's mess. The cereus hedge on the campus lava rock wall was topped with barbed wire. Punahou students volunteered in hospitals and raised enough in war bonds to purchase two bombers and a fighter (among other airplanes), which were named after alumni who had fallen in service.

On August 7, 1972, the campus was added to the National Register of Historic Places listings in Oahu.

== Traditions ==
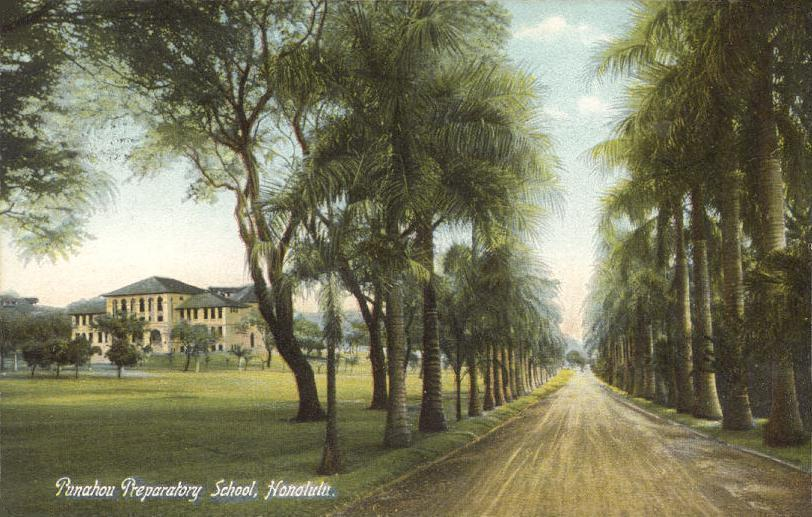
Campus view in 1909

Many traditional events take place on campus. On the first Friday and Saturday of each February, the junior class hosts the Punahou Carnival. Proceeds from the carnival contribute to the Financial Aid program. The event is an entertainment highlight each year in Honolulu. All 9-11th grade students are required to work at least one 3-hour shift per carnival, and all students are let out of class early on Friday (typically before lunch) to enjoy the Carnival.

The Holoku Pageant is an annual celebration of the Hawaiian culture and arts. Students perform Hawaiian dances in traditional costumes, from the hula to the haka.

The annual Sustainability Fair began in 2007 and included on-campus conservation challenges and off-campus coastline preservation. On Rice Field, classes set up canopies to showcase sustainable undertakings and projects, often including local produce sales and informational handouts.

To celebrate the school's homecoming, students, faculty, and teachers surround a 20-foot letter P, and ignite it at dusk. This event, the "Flaming P", is preceded by a spirit week, where students dress and parade creatively.

Seniors write and perform a Variety Show. This play involves most of the class, over 300 students. Seniors also have prom at the Sheraton Waikiki Hotel, Skip Day at the Kikila Estate and Pounders Beach, and senior lunch. With each student attired in either a blue blazer or a formal white Hawaiian dress, senior year ends with baccalaureate ceremonies at Central Union Church, and commencement at Stan Sheriff Center (since 2018).

Graduates who started Punahou in kindergarten are members of the Thirteen Plus Club.

In June, the school hosts an Alumni Luau on campus that the newly graduated class can enjoy with other alumni. The annual luau also functions as a major fundraising event for the school.

Throughout most of the school's history, elementary schoolchildren have been allowed to attend in bare feet. Aloha shirts were once restricted to Fridays, but dress codes were relaxed considerably during the 1970s.

== Location ==
All schools in Honolulu city (public and private) have an urban residential location. Nearby buildings include apartment buildings, private houses, a retirement home, the Catholic Maryknoll School, several small churches, and two hospitals.

Punahou shares the entrance to Manoa Valley with the University of Hawaiʻi main campus and a few other schools such as Mid-Pacific Institute.

Punahou students are a few minutes away from the trail to Manoa Falls, the beaches at Ala Moana and Waikiki, downtown Honolulu, Lyon Arboretum, and the National Memorial Cemetery of the Pacific.

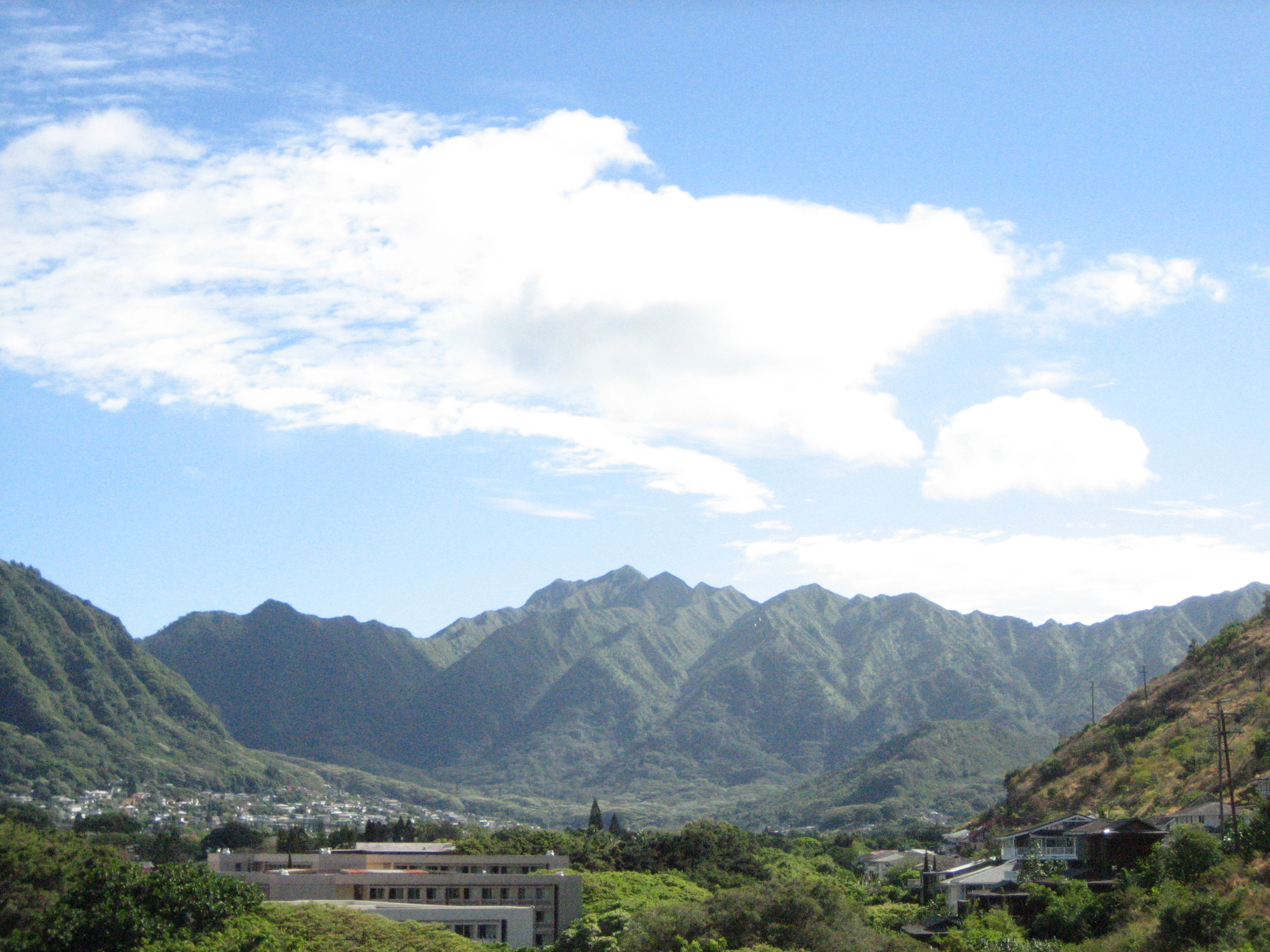
Situated in the foothills of the Koolau Mountains, Punahou shares Manoa Valley with the University of Hawaiʻi main campus and a few other schools

Punahou's location provides many opportunities for off-campus learning: field trip destinations for middle school students have included the Bishop Museum, Waikiki Aquarium, Waikiki Shell, Waikiki Natatorium War Memorial, Kawaiahaʻo Church, Sea Life Park, USS Arizona Memorial, Valley of the Temples Memorial Park, Fort Ruger at Diamond Head, Hanauma Bay, Honolulu Museum of Art, Honolulu Zoo, Iolani Palace, Hawaii State Capitol, and the beaches on Oahu's North Shore. Clubs and classes often organize trips to neighboring islands, especially to Hawaii Volcanoes National Park and the Kohala Coast on the Big Island.

== The school in recent years ==
Tuition was $30,480 for the 2023–24 school year, not including student activity fees. Tuition does not cover the entire cost of educating a student, and the school's endowment makes up the difference. Punahou reported its endowment at $239 million in 2014. Although these figures are high among mainland U.S. private schools, Honolulu's Iolani School has a comparable endowment (twice the endowment per pupil), and Kamehameha Schools has a $5 to $9 billion endowment (30 times the endowment per pupil) with a larger physical plant. Maui has Seabury Hall, which has twice the endowment per pupil.

In the class of 2015, three graduates went to Harvard University, three to Princeton University, and two to Yale University, with 22 total at Ivy League colleges. Seven attended Swarthmore College, Wellesley College, Amherst College, Tufts University, or Vassar College. Four attended Stanford University, two University of California, Berkeley, four Massachusetts Institute of Technology, 16 Boston University, and 12 New York University, with 23 total at University Athletic Association schools. Students in that class also chose Texas Christian University, Notre Dame University, Vanderbilt University, Villanova University, Rensselaer Polytechnic Institute, Rochester Institute of Technology, Michigan State University, Northeastern University, Boston College, Olin College of Engineering, Norwich Military College, New York University Shanghai, Erasmus/Rotterdam, Yonsei/S. Korea, Waseda/Japan, and Edinburgh/UK. Six were selected for study and training at US military academies. Schools throughout California, Washington, Oregon, Colorado, Utah, Arizona, and Nevada are also popular among graduates, and many students choose to attend local schools like the University of Hawaiʻi and Chaminade.

The class of 2012 had 30 of Hawaii's 70 National Merit Semifinalists. The class of 2013 had 20 semifinalists, and five of the state's ten National Merit Scholars.

Punahou's 33 Presidential Scholars were graduates of the classes of 1964, 1966, 1970, 1971, 1975, 1978 (two), 1979, 1982, 1984 (two members), 1985, 1986 (two), 1991, 1992 (two), 1993, 1995, 1996, 1998, 2001, 2002, 2004 (three), 2005, 2006, 2008, 2011, 2016 (two), 2017, and 2021.

In 2006, it was ranked the greenest school in America. In 2017, Punahou's sports program was ranked second nationally in the MaxPreps Cup standings.

Punahou's student body is diverse, with student selection based on both academic and non-academic considerations. The school is a founding member of the Mastery Transcript Consortium, and uses a competency-based learning framework in some courses.

A recent study of the class of 1979 showed that 15 had a PhD, 22 had an MD, 39 had a JD, 18 had an MBA, 10 had a DDS, DMD, DVM, or an ND (about one quarter of the class reaching terminal degrees). 4 were officers in the US armed services. 12 had degrees from Harvard University, Yale University, or Princeton University, 14 from Stanford University, 17 from University of California, Berkeley, and 26 total from Ivy League colleges.

=== Facilities ===
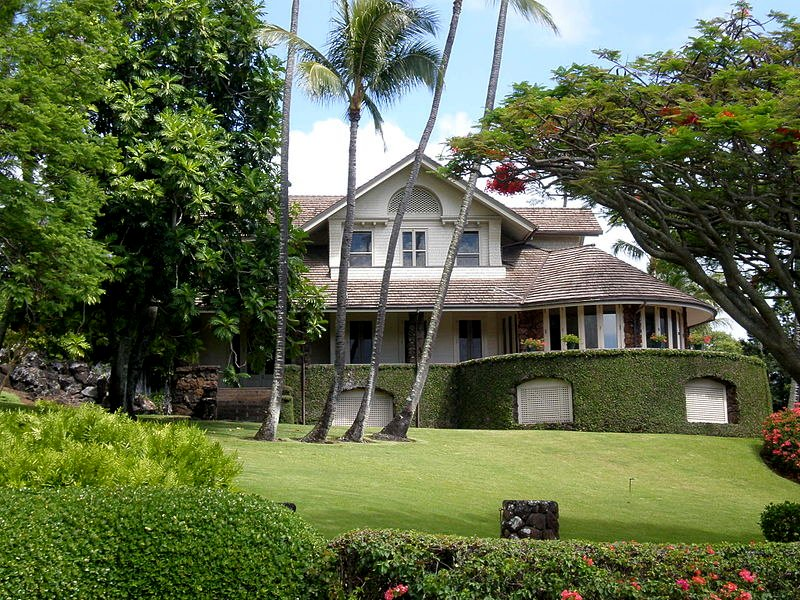
Punahou School President's House on campus

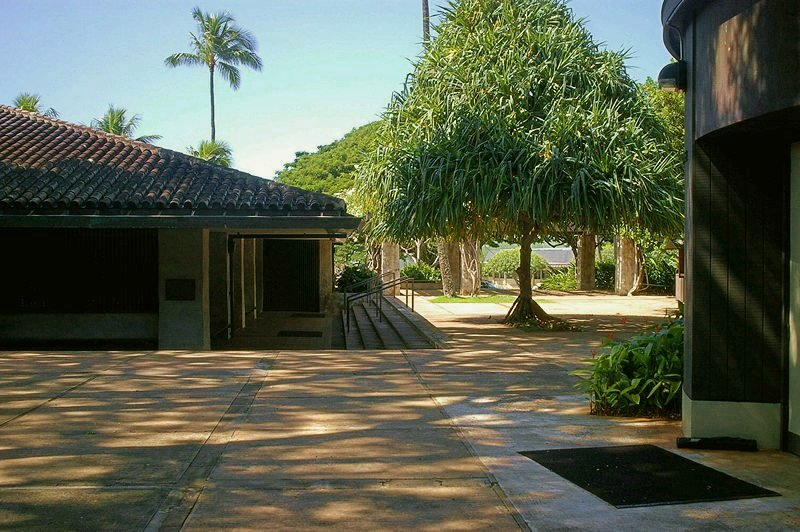
Chapel courtyard and Round House

About 5,000 faculty, students, and staff work in 44 buildings on 76 acres. The Robert Thurston Memorial Chapel on campus was building designed and built in 1966 by architect Vladimir Ossipoff and feature textile screens made by local artist Ruthadell Anderson. The school is built over a natural spring. Thurston Chapel's wall meets at a pond formed by the spring and features a low hung stained glass.

==== Case Middle School ====
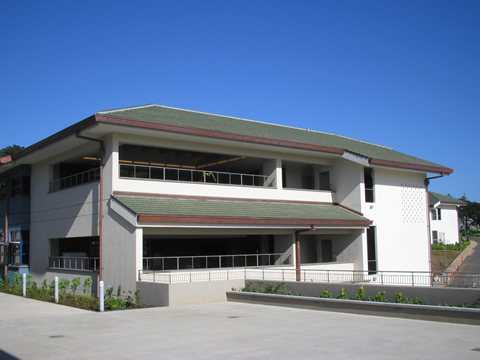
One of nine new Case Middle School buildings on campus

Before plans were made for a new middle school complex, America Online founder and alumnus Steve Case (1976) donated $10 million. This led to construction of a new middle school for grades six through eight, Case Middle School, named for Case's parents. The project earned a Leadership in Energy and Environmental Design Gold certification and a Project of the Year award in Hawaiian Electric Company's Energy Efficiency Awards.

Case Middle School consists of nine buildings with a total cost of roughly $50 million, made possible solely through donations.

==== Omidyar K-1 Neighborhood ====
In late 2010 a new five-building indoor/outdoor section of campus opened for Punahou's youngest students. It was constructed and operated with sustainable living as a principal goal, and the curriculum has a focus on sustainability. With solar energy, efficient landscaping, rain catchment and ecofriendly materials, the complex received a platinum rating from the U.S. Green Building Council.

Teachers are encouraged to personalize their classroom spaces, and each of the 12 rooms has its own outdoor area that is one-third the size of the interior space to which it is attached.

The total cost was $26 million. Individual buildings are named the Mountain House, Forest House, and City House, and historic Wilcox Hall retains its traditional name. Board of Trustees member and eBay founder Pierre Omidyar (1984) donated $6 million to the project.

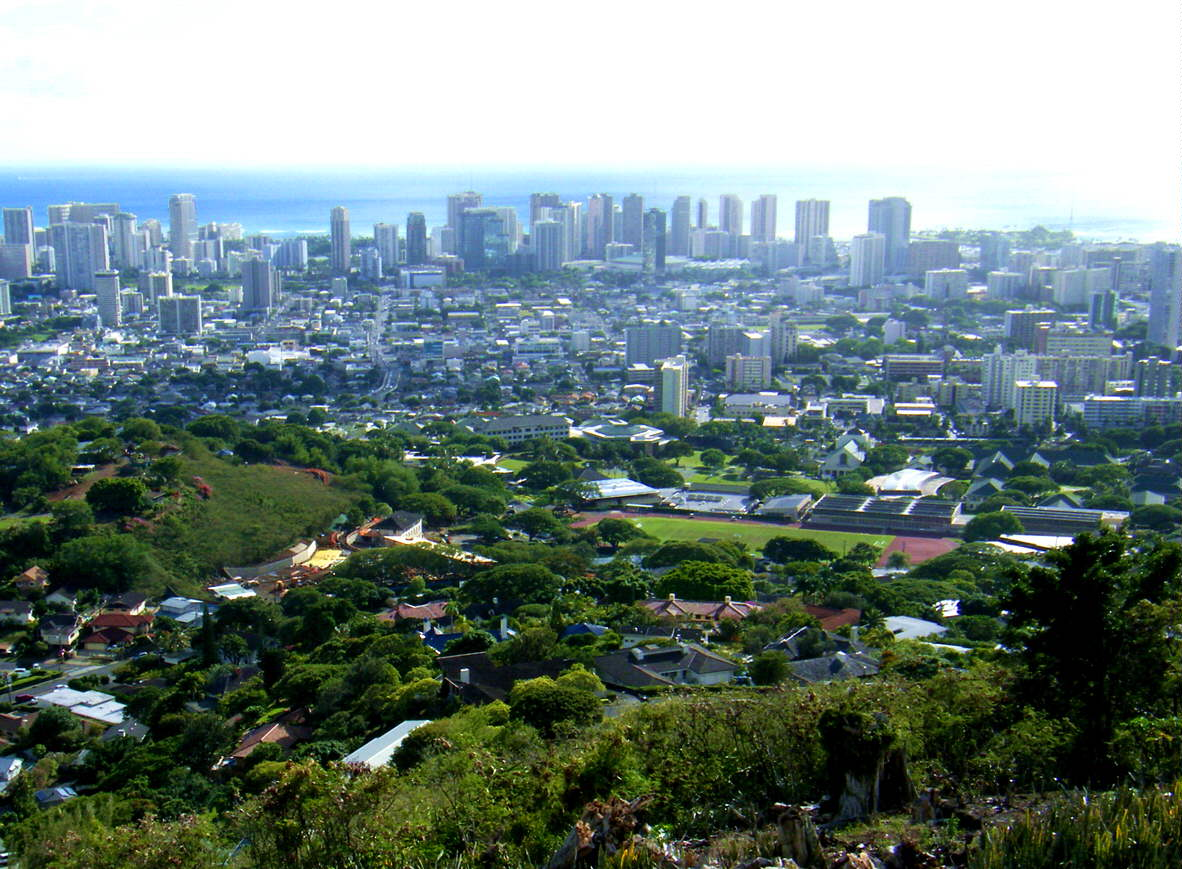
Punahou's urban location places its students minutes away from Waikiki and downtown Honolulu.

=== Athletics ===
Punahou's athletics program is the most successful in Hawaii. It has won more state championships than any other high school in the nation. In 2008 and in 2009, Sports Illustrated ranked Punahou's sports program the best in the country.

Punahou football plays the second half of its season at the Aloha Stadium (where the Pro Bowl and Aloha Bowl were played). In fall 2014, the varsity football team ranked as high as 15th in the nation.

Athletic facilities include the Olympic-size Waterhouse Pool, a football field, a baseball diamond, two softball diamonds, and an eight-lane track. The school also has a fieldhouse for competitive athletics, an open-air weightlifting facility, a gymnasium for physical education and intramural sports, and a tennis center with eight hard surface courts. Rocky Hill has been used as a live firing range for Junior Reserve Officers' Training Corps and competitive target sports. Air riflery uses an indoor firing range.

Students need two athletic credits to graduate, which is a total of four semesters. They can earn these credits through P.E. and ILH sports.

Students compete in 22 sports, including [air riflery, baseball, basketball, bowling, canoe paddling, cross country running, cheerleading, football, golf, gymnastics, judo, kayaking, riflery, sailing, soccer, softball, swimming and diving, tennis, track and field, volleyball, water polo, and wrestling. Punahou has approximately 120 sports teams. The school is a member of the Interscholastic League of Honolulu.

Punahou teams earned 20 championships in 2009–10, out of about 30 varsity it teams fielded.

==== State championships ====
State championships
Season	Sport	Number of championships	Year
Fall	Football	2 + 12	2008, 2013 *State championship bowl instituted in 1973. Prior to 1973, Punahou had 19 ILH championships. As the OIA was founded in 1940, the ILH championships of 1909–1917, 1919–1920, and 1924 can be considered "state" or "island" championships. Punahou is 2–3 in the state bowl against OIA opponents.
Fall	Volleyball, Girls	9	1973, 1993, 1996, 2000, 2003, 2004, 2011, 2012, 2014
Fall	Cross Country, Boys	13	1965, 1978, 1981, 1985, 1986, 1987, 1988, 1989, 1990, 1991, 1996, 2019, 2021
Fall	Cross Country, Girls	35	1973, 1974, 1978, 1979, 1981, 1982, 1983, 1984, 1985, 1986, 1988, 1991, 1992, 1995, 1996, 1997, 1999, 2000, 2005, 2006, 2007, 2008, 2009, 2010, 2012, 2013, 2014, 2016, 2017, 2018, 2019, 2021, 2022, 2023
Fall	Air Riflery, Boys	7	2005, 2006, 2007, 2008, 2009, 2011, 2014
Fall	Air Riflery, Girls	7	2001, 2002, 2005, 2008, 2011, 2016, 2025
Fall	Esports	4	2020 (League of Legends), 2022 (Smash Ultimate), 2024 (Smash Ultimate), 2025 (Smash Ultimate)
Winter	Wrestling, Boys	8	1967, 1968, 2007, 2008, 2009, 2010, 2011, 2012
Winter	Wrestling, Girls	3	2009, 2010, 2011
Winter	Basketball, Boys	12	1970, 1974, 1975, 1979, 1980, 1981, 1990, 1999, 2008, 2012, 2018, 2025
Winter	Basketball, Girls	11	1979, 1980, 1981, 1994, 1997, 1998, 2003, 2005, 2006, 2008, 2013
Winter	Soccer, Boys	22	1976, 1977, 1982, 1983, 1985, 1986, 1989, 1990, 1991, 1992, 1994, 1995, 1996, 1998, 2006, 2007, 2010, 2011, 2015, 2016, 2017, 2019, 2020
Winter	Soccer, Girls	14	1983, 1984, 1985, 1986, 1998, 2003, 2004, 2005, 2009, 2010, 2011, 2023, 2024, 2025
Winter	Swimming, Boys	51	1958, 1959, 1960, 1961, 1962, 1963, 1964, 1965, 1966, 1967, 1968, 1969, 1970, 1971, 1972, 1973, 1974, 1975, 1976, 1977, 1978, 1979, 1980, 1981, 1982, 1983, 1984, 1985, 1986, 1989, 1990, 1991, 1992, 1993, 1994, 1995, 1997, 1999, 2001, 2007, 2008, 2010, 2013, 2014, 2015, 2016, 2017, 2018, 2019, 2020, 2025, 2026
Winter	Swimming, Girls	58	1958, 1959, 1960, 1961, 1962, 1963, 1964, 1965, 1966, 1967, 1968, 1969, 1970, 1971, 1972, 1974, 1975, 1976, 1977, 1978, 1979, 1980, 1981, 1982, 1983, 1984, 1985, 1986, 1987, 1988, 1989, 1990, 1991, 1992, 1993, 1994, 1995, 1997, 1999, 2000, 2001, 2006, 2007, 2008, 2009, 2011, 2012, 2013, 2015, 2016, 2017, 2018, 2019, 2020, 2022, 2023, 2024, 2025, 2026
Winter	Canoe Paddling, Boys	9	2002, 2012, 2015, 2016, 2017, 2018, 2020, 2022, 2023
Winter	Canoe Paddling, Girls	7	2006, 2008, 2009, 2014, 2015, 2018, 2019, 2022
Winter	Canoe Paddling, Mixed	6	2009, 2014, 2015, 2019, 2022, 2023
Spring	Golf, Boys	12	1970, 1995, 1996, 1997, 2008, 2010, 2011, 2013, 2014, 2015, 2025, 2026
Spring	Golf, Girls	15	2007, 2008, 2009, 2010, 2011, 2013, 2014, 2015, 2016, 2017, 2018, 2022, 2024, 2025, 2026
Spring	Volleyball, Boys	40	1972, 1973, 1974, 1975, 1976, 1977, 1981, 1982, 1983, 1984, 1985, 1986, 1987, 1988, 1989, 1990, 1992, 1994, 1995, 1996, 1997, 1998, 1999, 2000, 2004, 2005, 2007, 2009, 2010, 2011, 2013, 2014, 2015, 2017, 2018, 2019, 2022, 2023, 2025
Spring	Water Polo, Girls	17	2004, 2005, 2008, 2009, 2010, 2011, 2012, 2013, 2014, 2015, 2017, 2018, 2019, 2022, 2025, 2026
Spring	Tennis, Boys	53	1958, 1959, 1960, 1961, 1962, 1963, 1964, 1969, 1970, 1972, 1973, 1974, 1975, 1976, 1977, 1979, 1983, 1984, 1985, 1986, 1987, 1988, 1989, 1991, 1992, 1993, 1994, 1995, 1996, 1997, 1998, 1999, 2000, 2001, 2002, 2003, 2004, 2005, 2006, 2007, 2008, 2009, 2010, 2011, 2012, 2013, 2014, 2015, 2016, 2022, 2023, 2024, 2025, 2026
Spring	Tennis, Girls	50	1959, 1960, 1961, 1962, 1963, 1964, 1965, 1966, 1967, 1968, 1969, 1970, 1971, 1972, 1973, 1974, 1975, 1976, 1977, 1978, 1981, 1983, 1984, 1985, 1986, 1988, 1989, 1990, 1991, 2003, 2004, 2005, 2006, 2007, 2008, 2009, 2010, 2011, 2012, 2013, 2014, 2015, 2017, 2018, 2019, 2022, 2023, 2024, 2025, 2026
Spring	Judo, Boys	3	2006, 2008, 2009
Spring	Judo, Girls	3	2009, 2010, 2011
Spring	Track and Field, Boys	36	1959, 1960, 1961, 1962, 1965, 1967, 1968, 1969, 1970, 1972, 1973, 1974, 1975, 1977, 1978, 1979, 1980, 1984, 1988, 1989, 1990, 1993, 1995, 1996, 1997, 1998, 1999, 2001, 2002, 2007, 2008, 2010, 2011, 2017, 2018, 2019, 2022
Spring	Track and Field, Girls	41	1967, 1968, 1969, 1970, 1972, 1977, 1978, 1979, 1981, 1982, 1983, 1984, 1985, 1986, 1987, 1988, 1989, 1990, 1991, 1992, 1996, 1997, 1998, 1999, 2000, 2001, 2004, 2005, 2006, 2007, 2009, 2010, 2011, 2012, 2013, 2018, 2019, 2022, 2023, 2024, 2026
Spring	Softball	1	2013
Spring	Baseball	14	1961, 1964, 1966, 1968, 1972, 1989, 2004, 2005, 2006, 2007, 2008, 2009, 2010, 2019
Spring	Esports	2	2021 (League of Legends), 2026 (Smash Ultimate)
Total		565	

Ka Punahou and Castle Hall

=== Other programs and honors ===
Punahou requires all students (K-12) to attend chapel once a week, where each homeroom is assigned its own seating and attendance is taken. In addition, students attend a mandatory weekly assembly to listen to announcements or watch student performances.

115801 Punahou is a minor planet named in the school's honor.

=== Sexual assault allegations and litigation ===
In April 2020, several former Punahou girls' basketball players filed a lawsuit over alleged abuse committed by their former coach Dwayne Yuen. Days later, the school disclosed additional sexual assault allegations dating back to the 1970s involving a former faculty member and baseball coach.

In January 2021, the school terminated the employment of a high school teacher based on allegations of sexual misconduct involving a former student. The teacher had been suspended from teaching and banned from campus since late November 2020 pending an internal investigation, which he did not cooperate with. The investigation found that the allegations were credible.

== Notable students and faculty ==
(Numerical claims are substantiated in the main article on alumni. * indicates the class year of an attendee who did not graduate with the class.)

Some Punahou Alumni
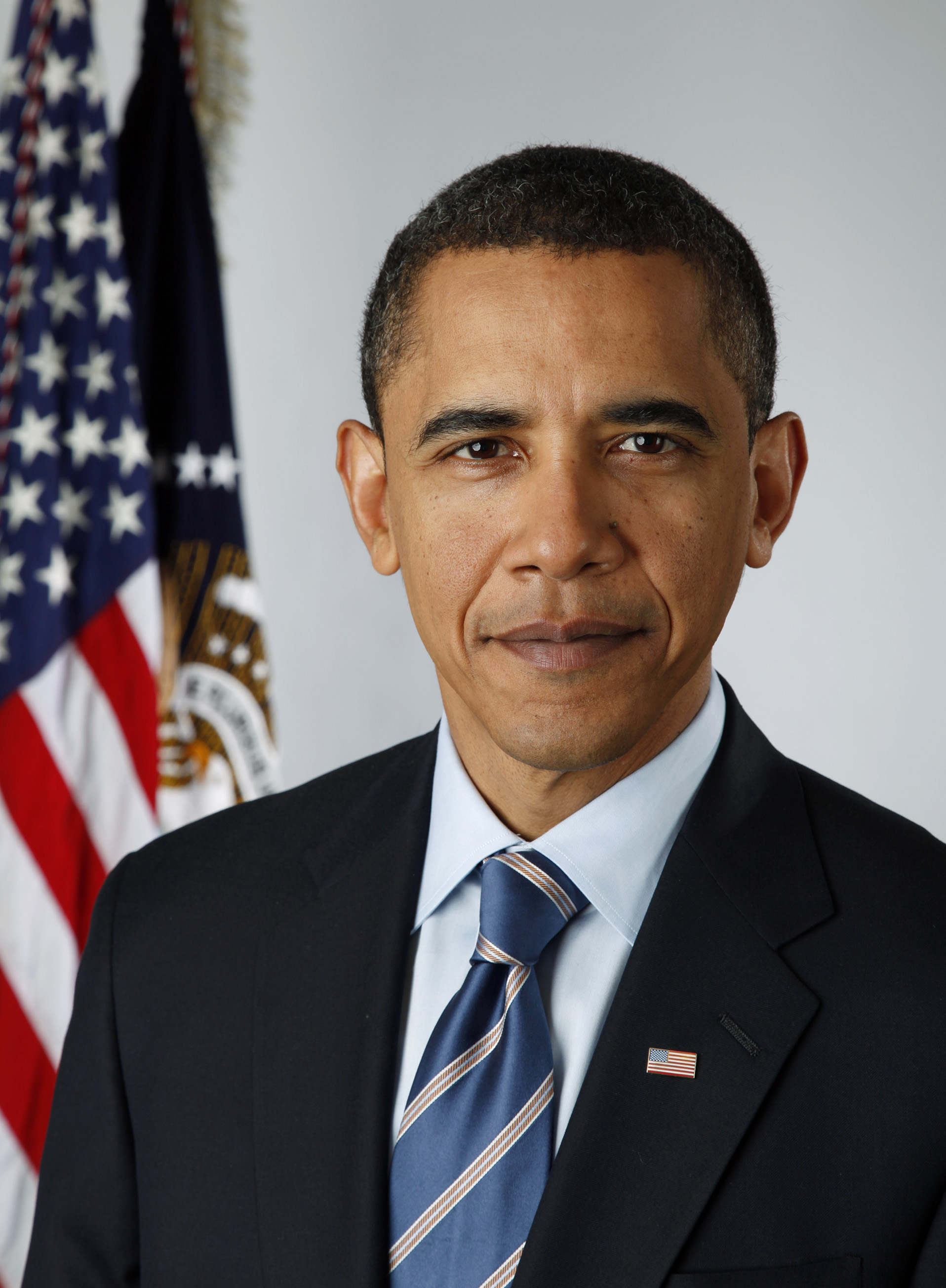
Barack Obama (1979), 44th US President

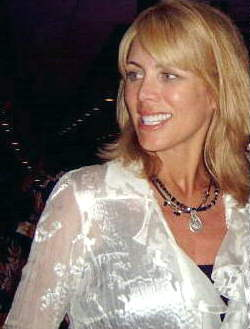
Teri Ann Linn (1979), The Bold and the Beautiful star

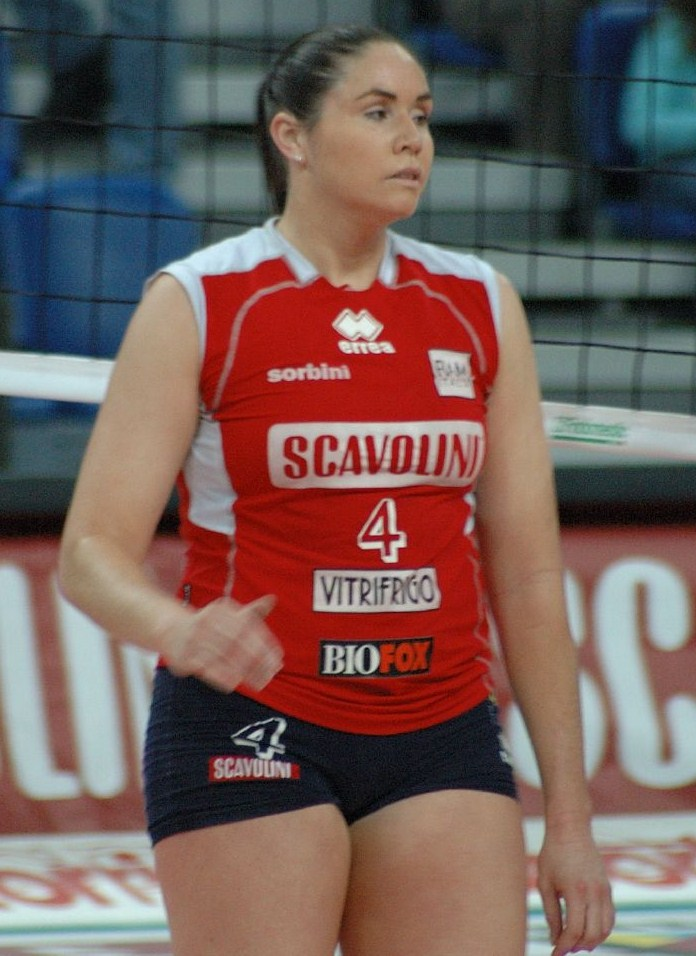
Lindsey Berg (1998), Olympian volleyball player

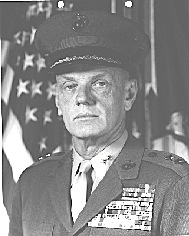
Ross T. Dwyer (1937), Marine Corps general

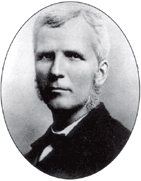
Samuel Chapman Armstrong (1859), general and educator

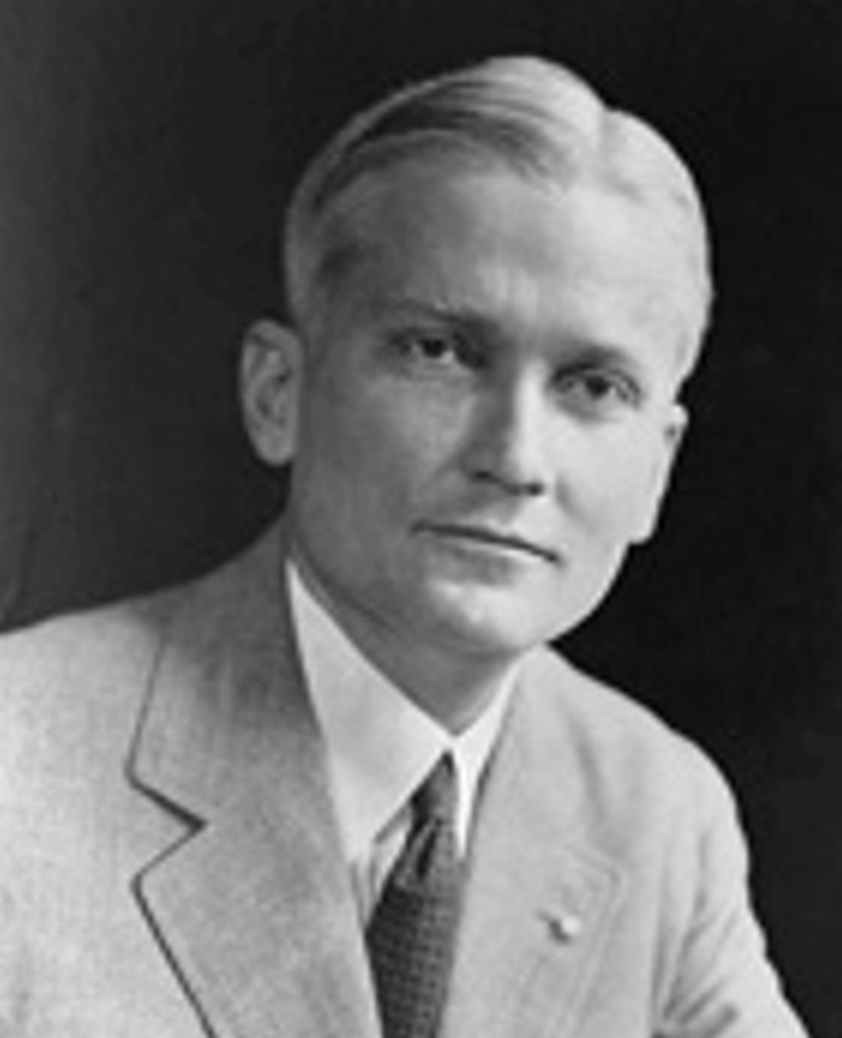
Hiram Bingham III (1892), academic and US senator

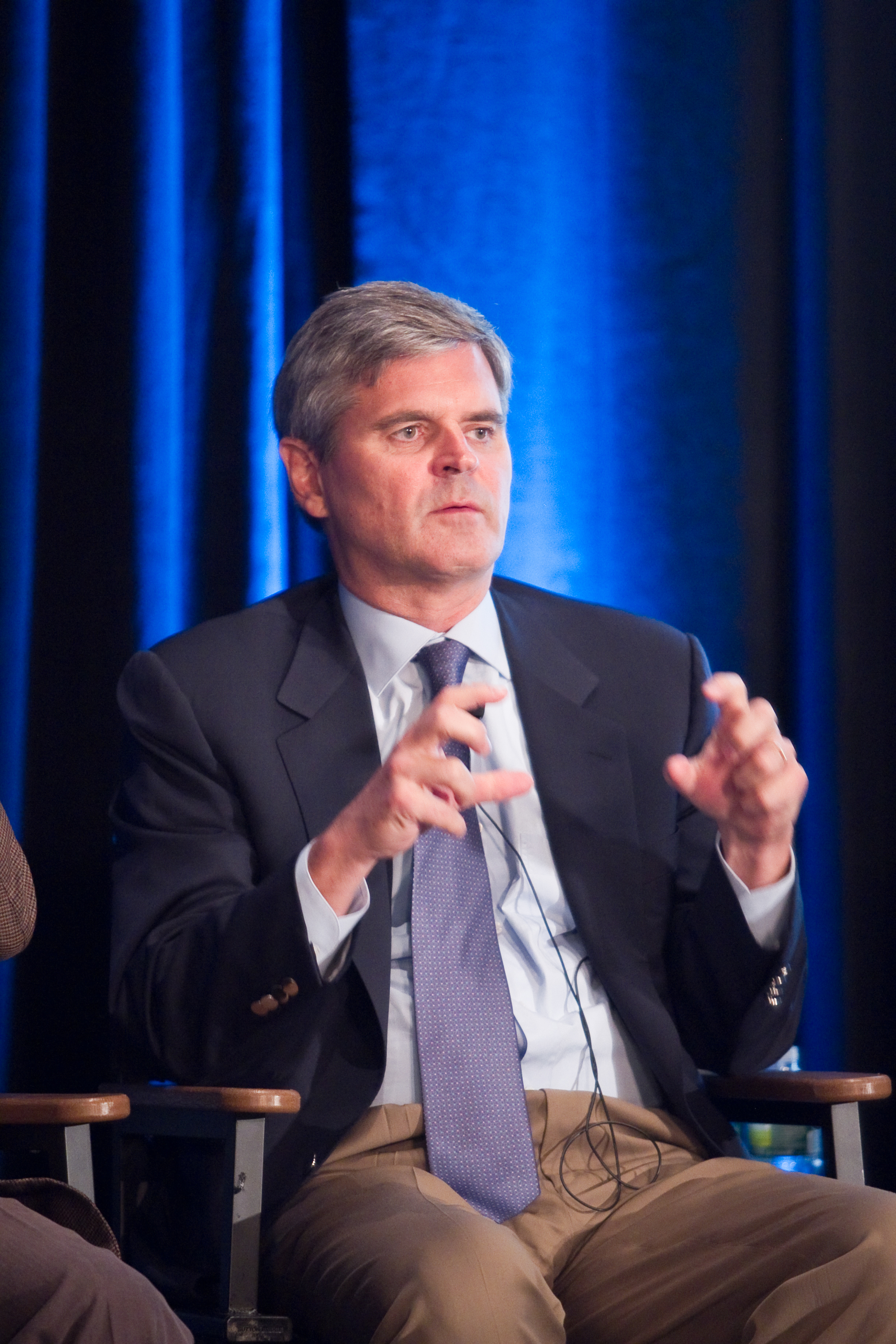
Steve Case (1976), AOL founder and Time Warner chairman

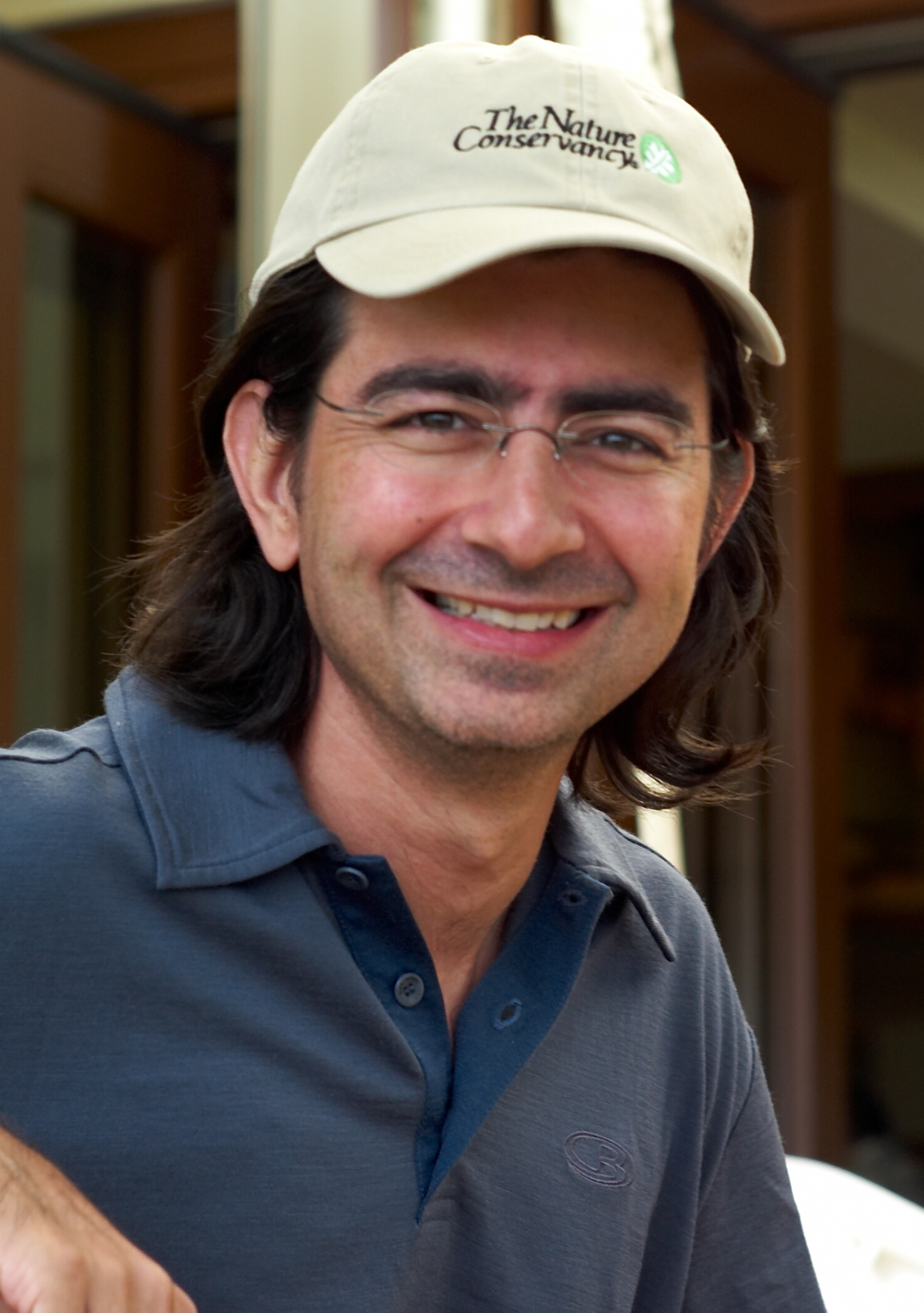
Pierre Omidyar (1984*), eBay founder

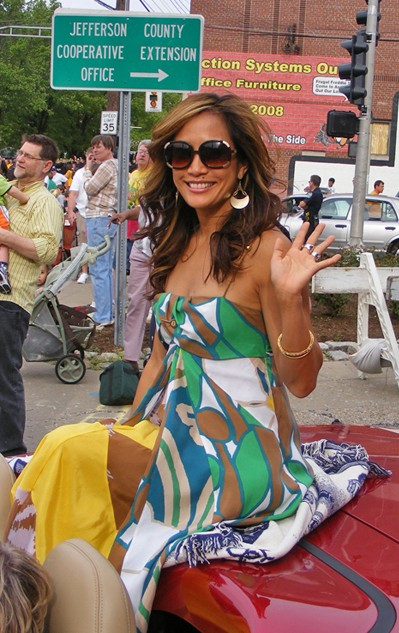
Carrie Ann Inaba (1986), Dancing with the Stars judge

Elbert Tuttle (1914), federal judge known for civil rights decisions

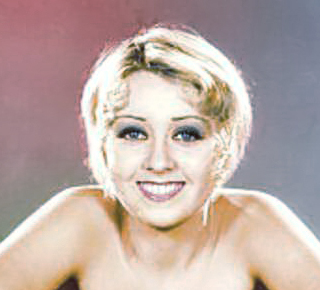
Joan Blondell (1925*), actress

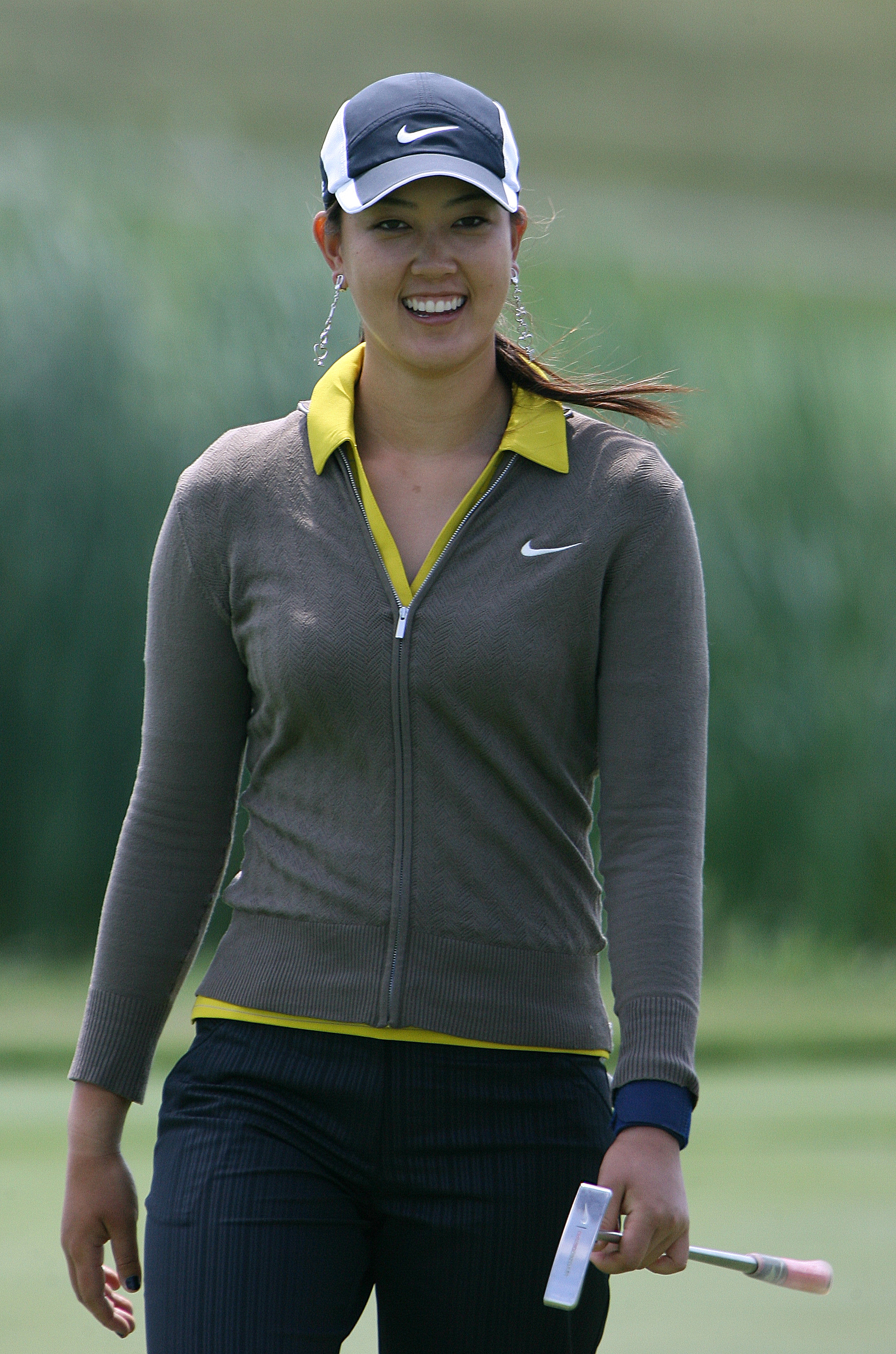
Michelle Wie (2007), golfer

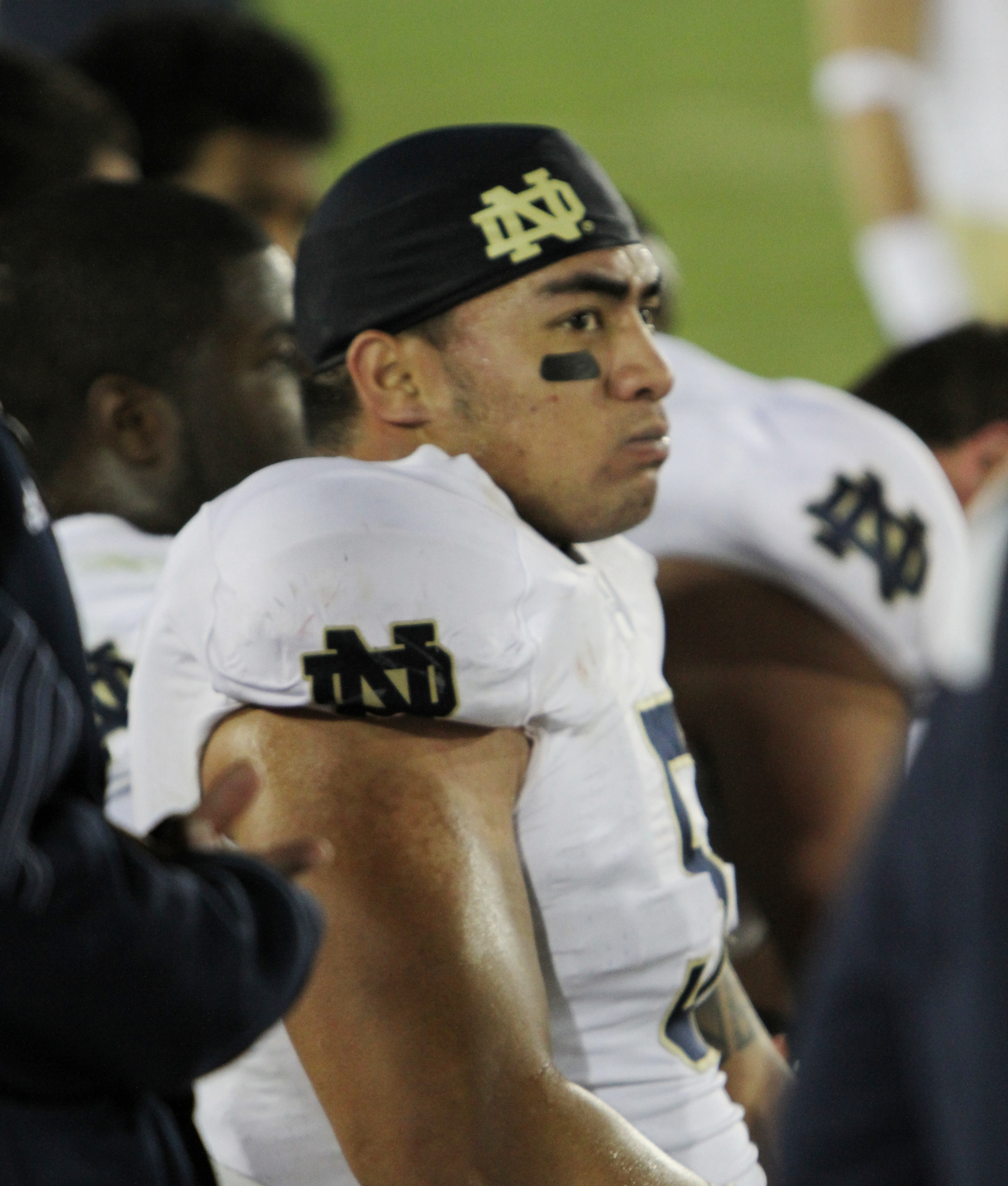
Manti Te'o (2009), football player

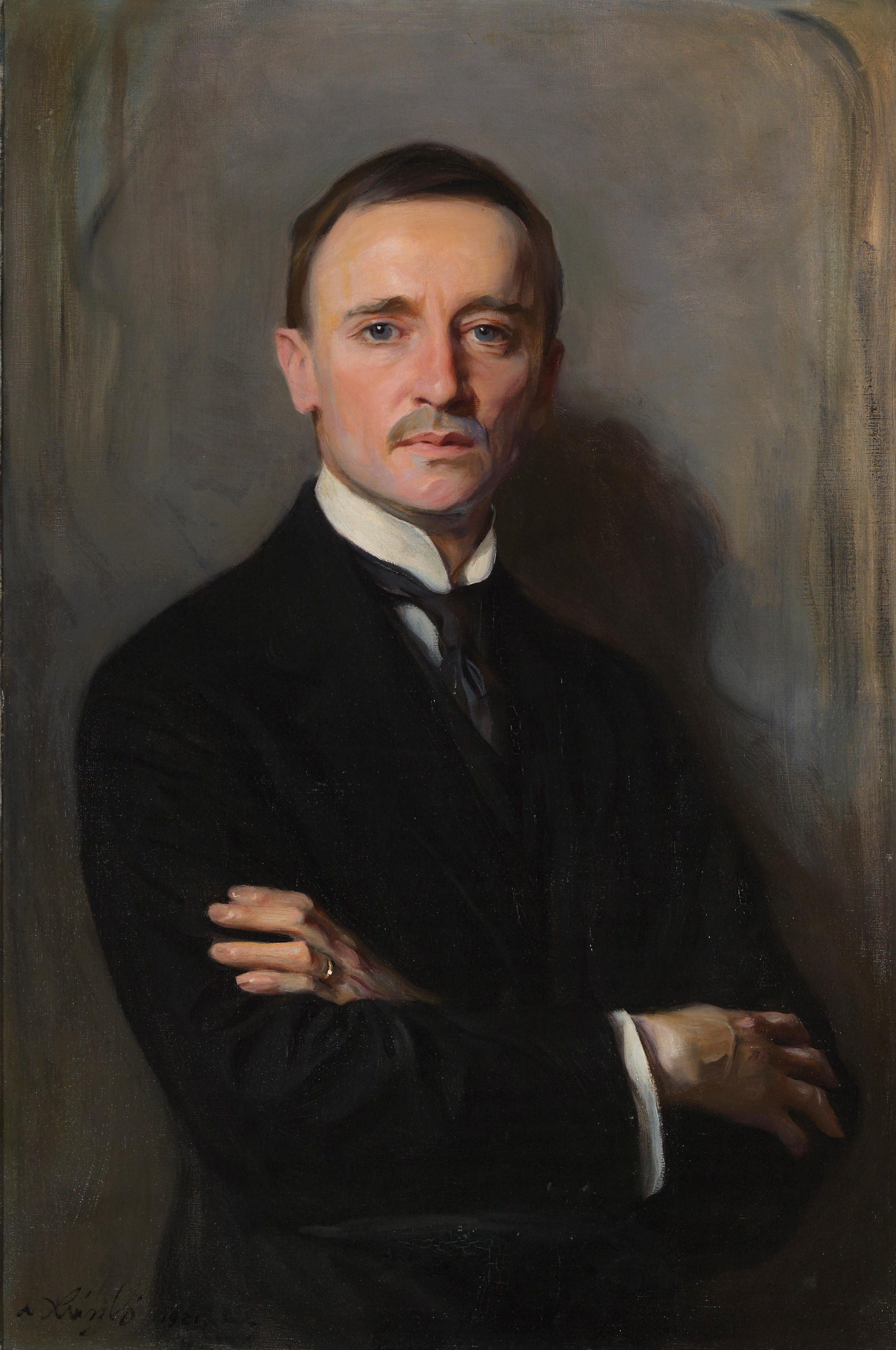
William Richards Castle, Jr. (1896), educator and diplomat

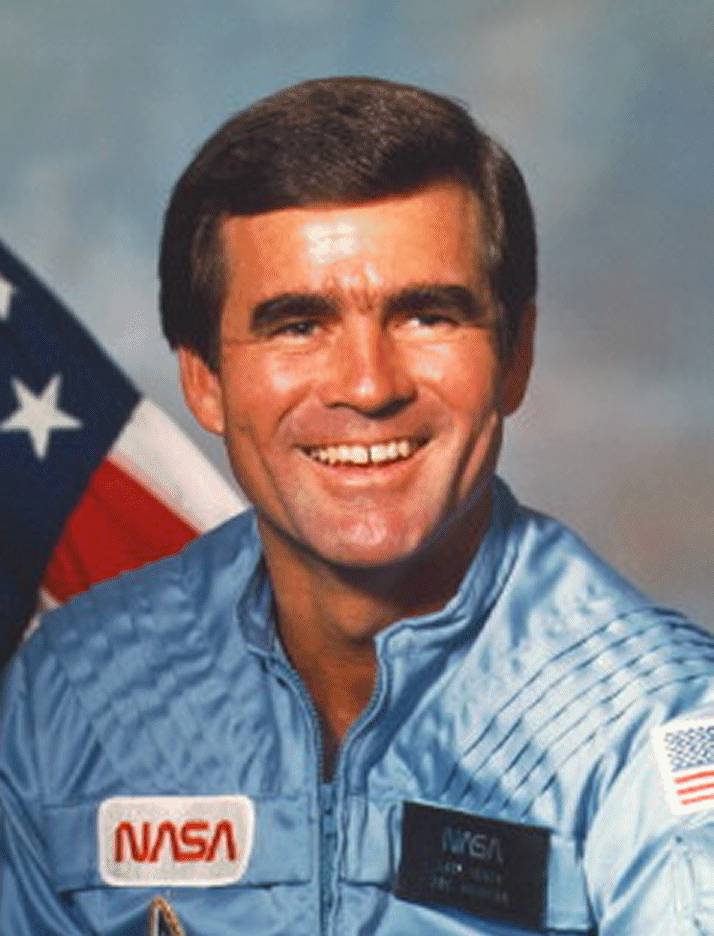
Charles L. Veach (1962), astronaut

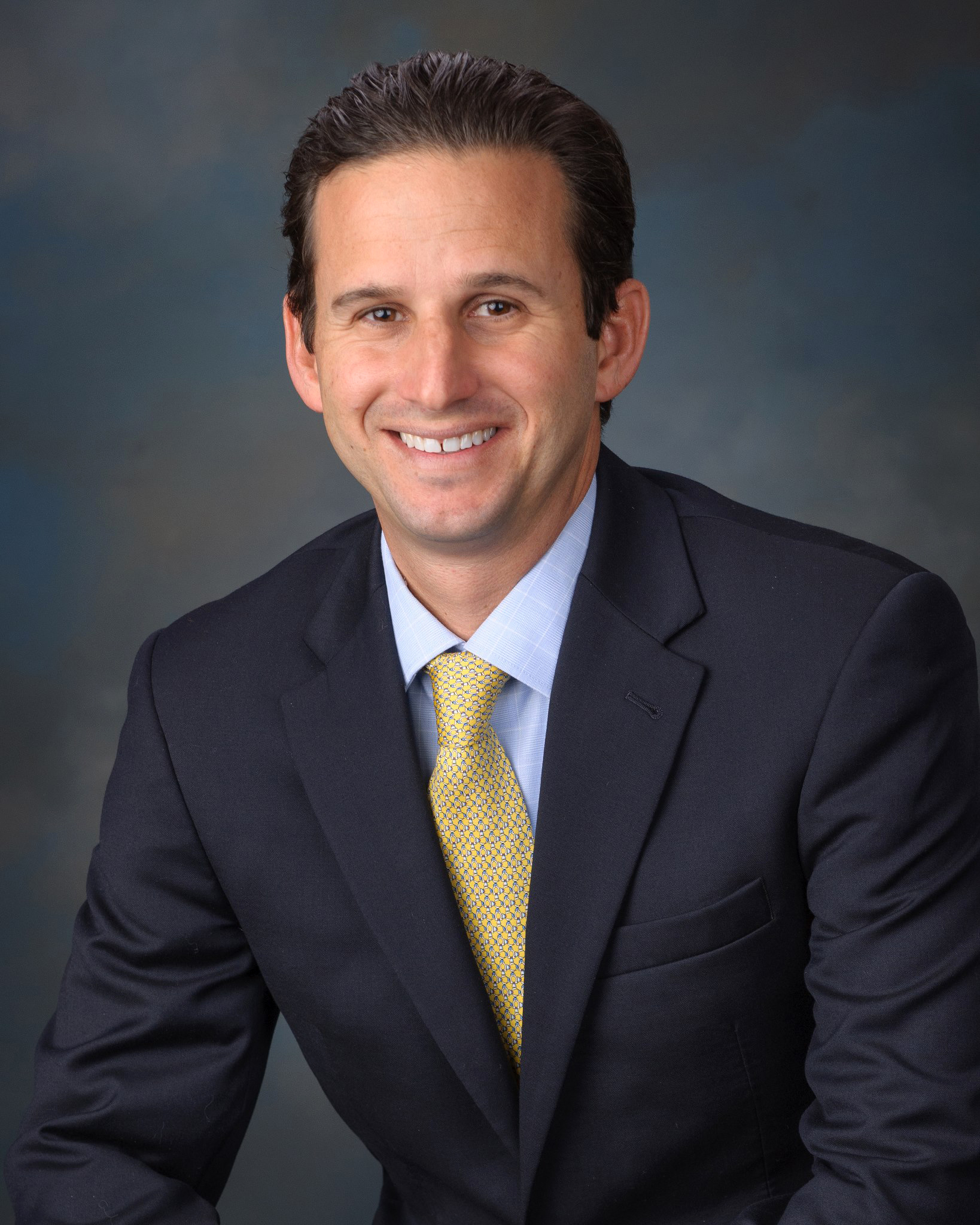
Brian Schatz (1990), US senator

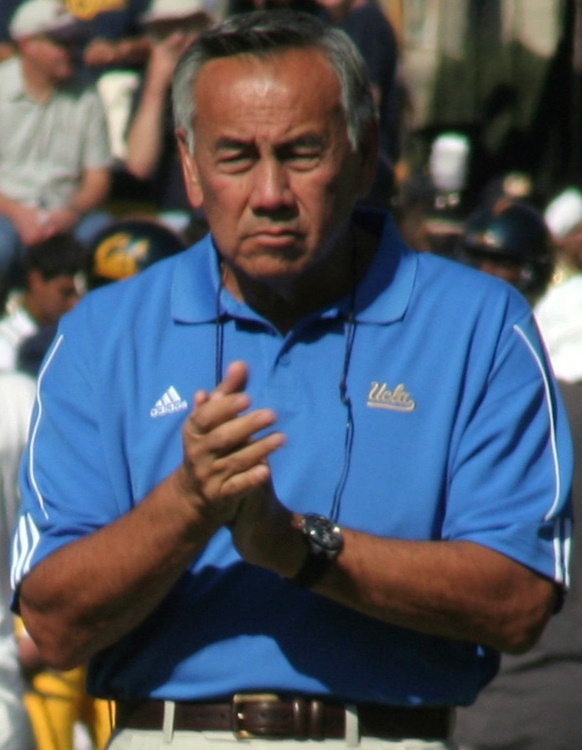
Norm Chow (1964), NFL offensive coordinator

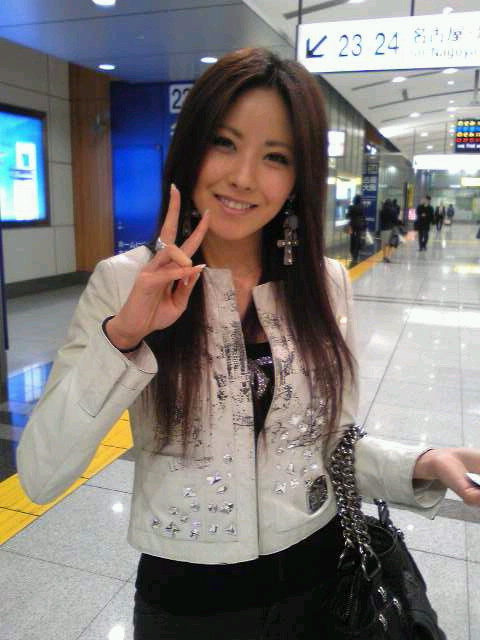
melody. (2000), singer

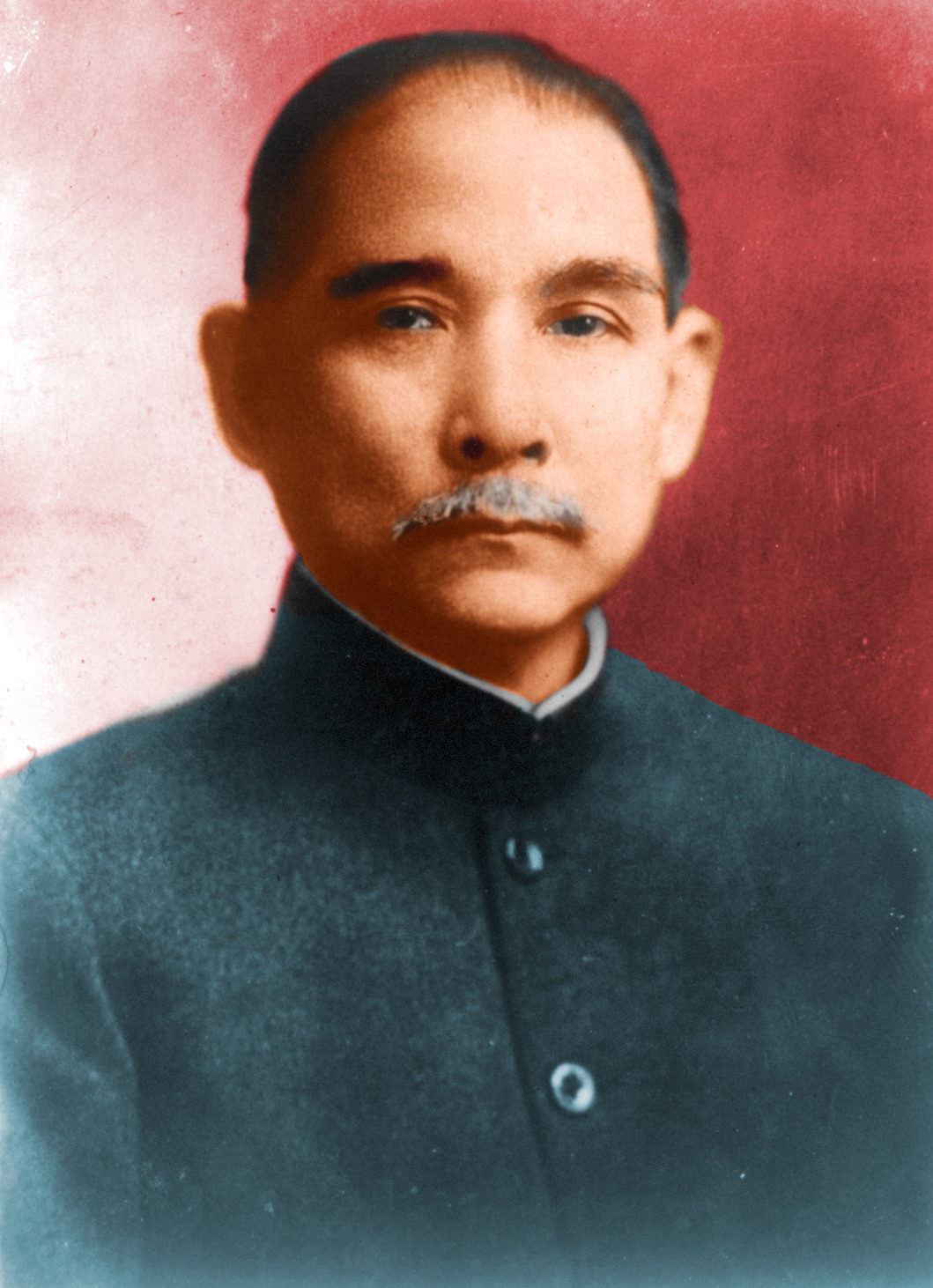
Sun Yat Sen (1883*), Chinese statesman

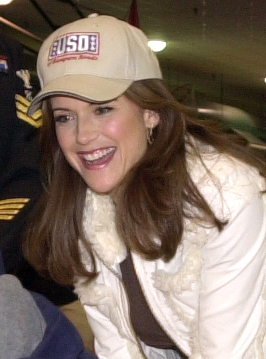
Kelly Preston (1980), actress

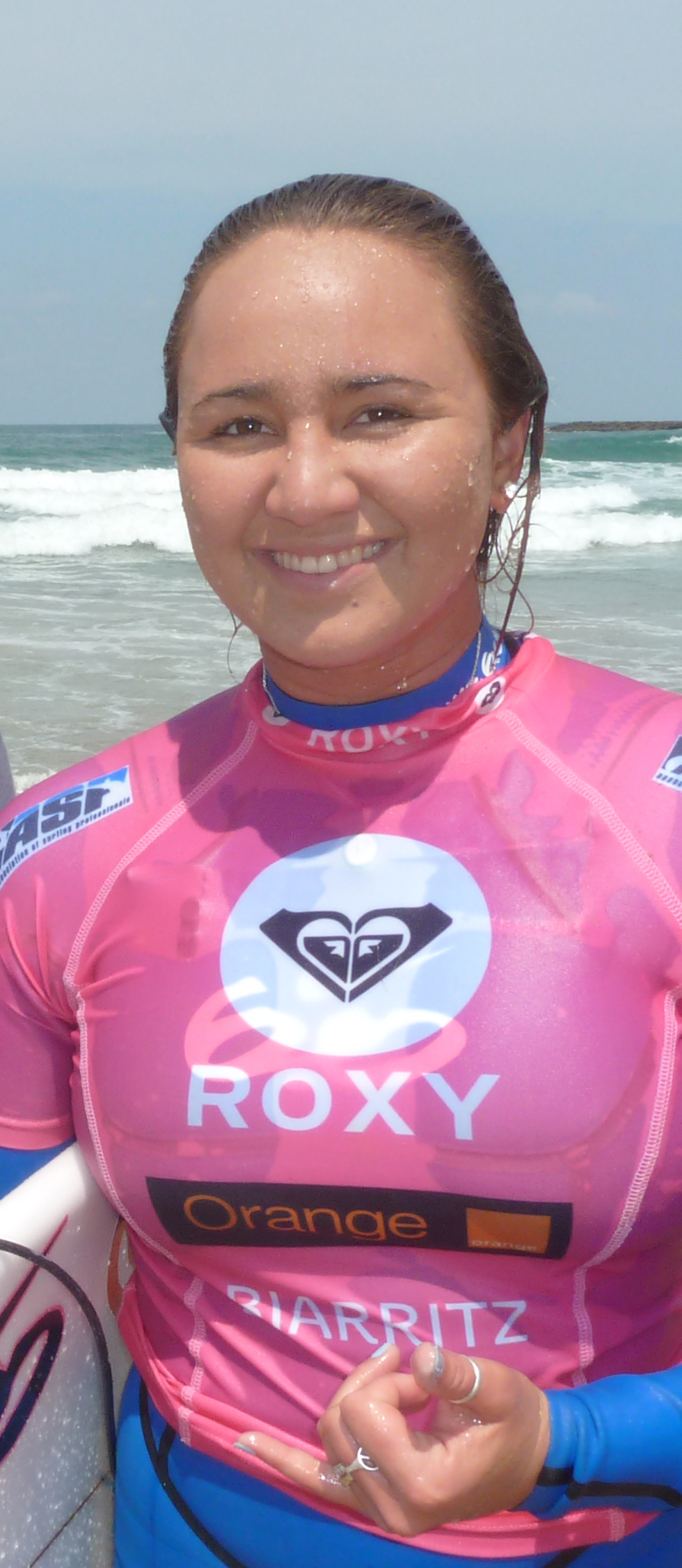
Carissa Moore (2010), Olympian surfer

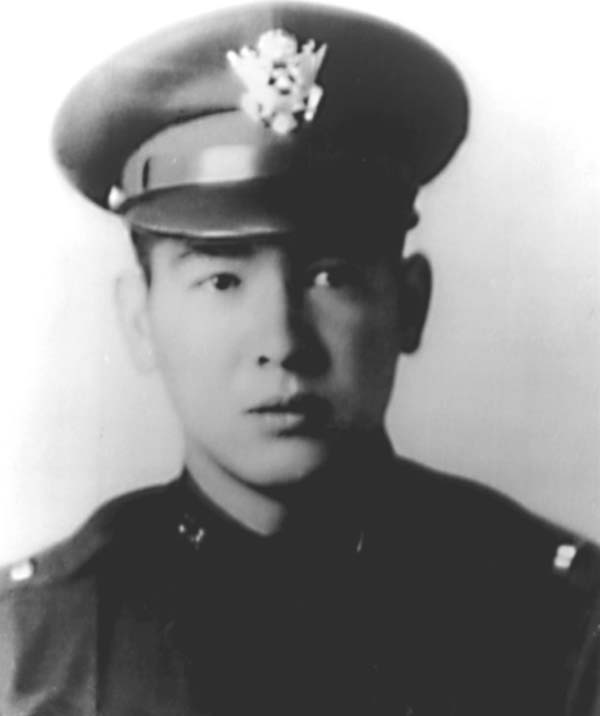
Francis Wai (1935), Medal of Honor recipient

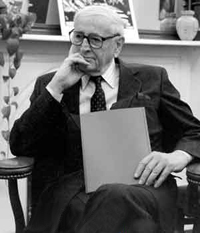
John W. Gardner (1929*), Secretary of Health, Education, and Welfare

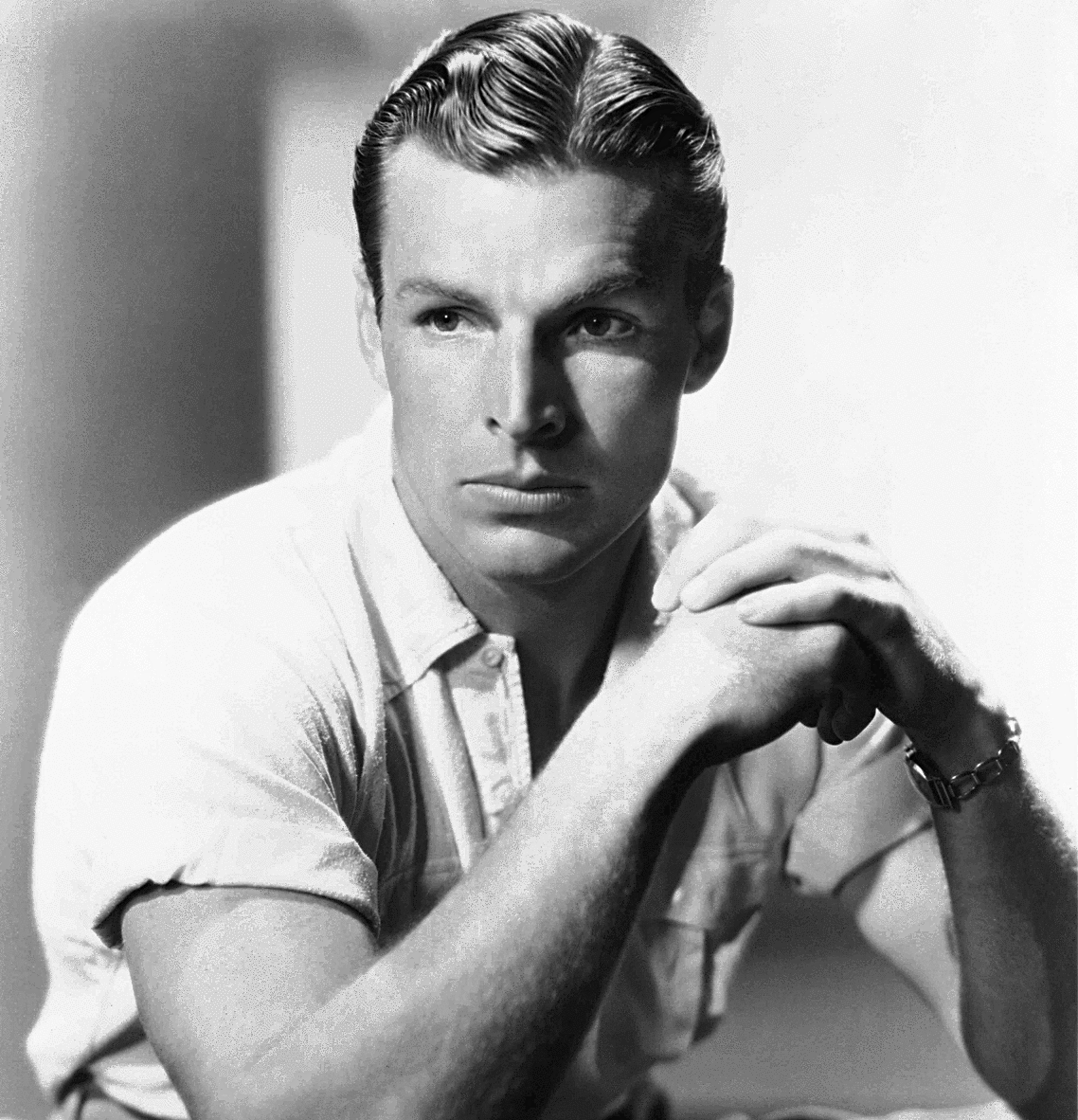
Buster Crabbe (1927), Olympian swimmer

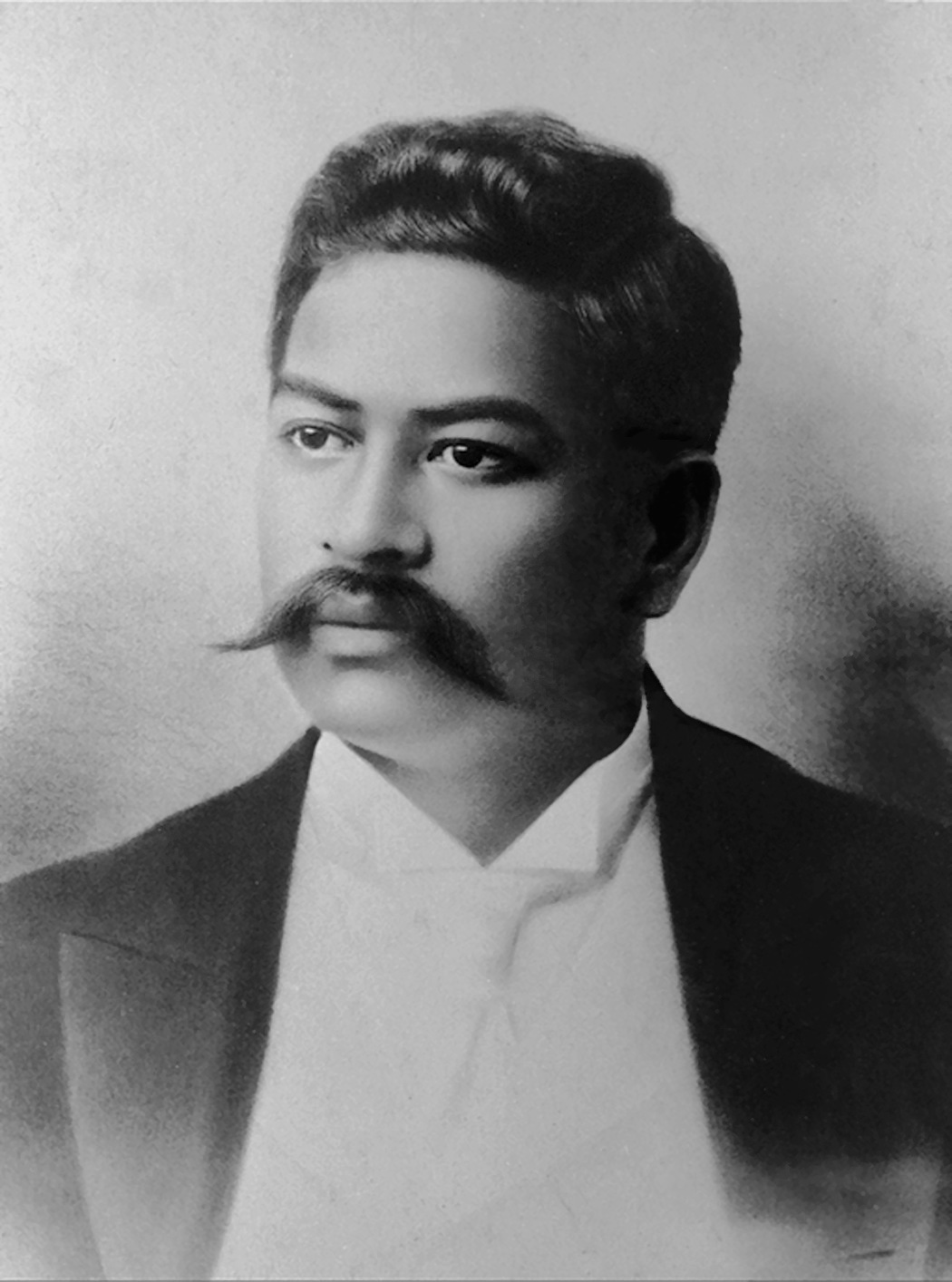
Hawaiian Prince Kuhio (1889), heir to the Hawaiian throne and delegate to the US Congress

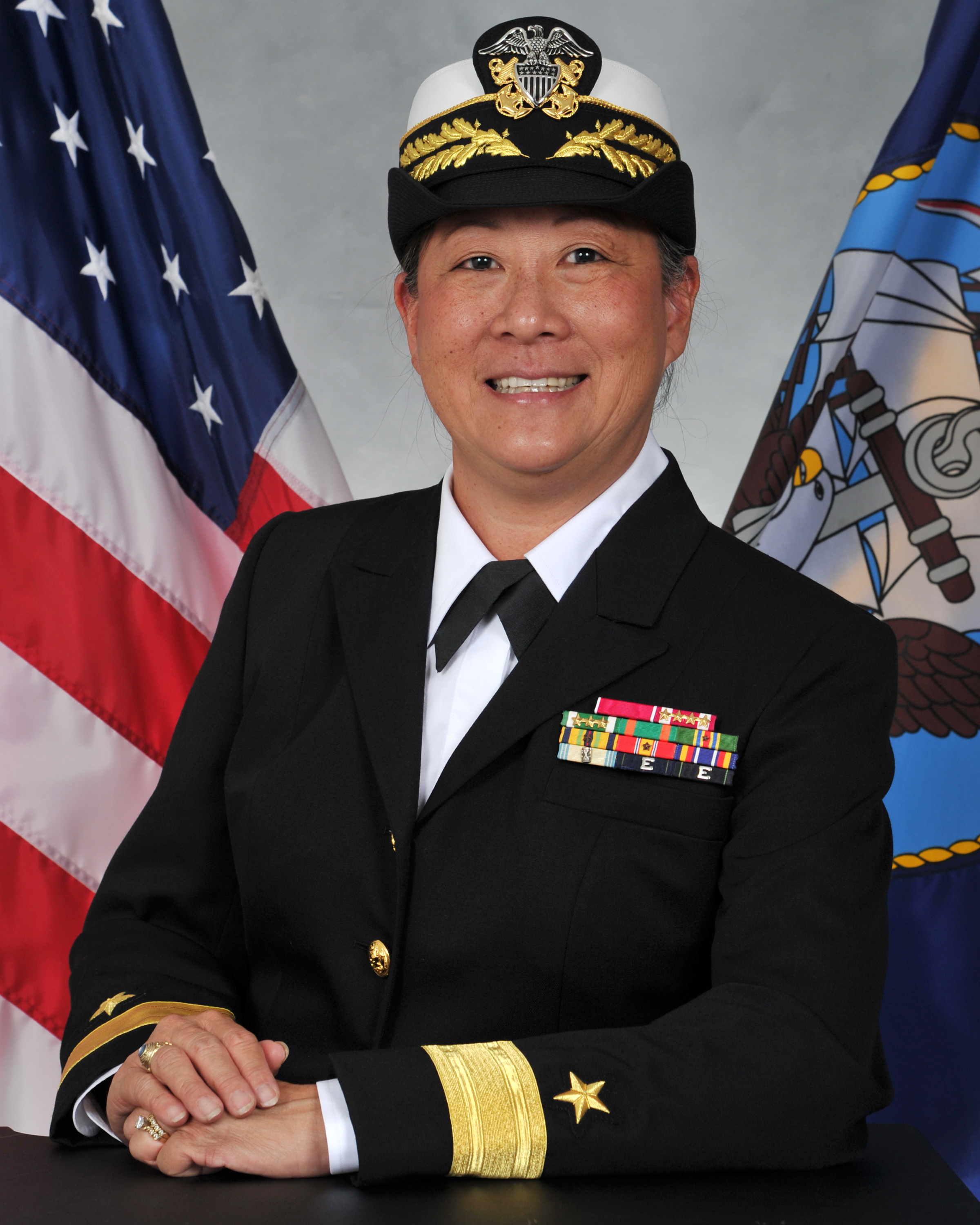
Alma M. Grocki (1977), admiral

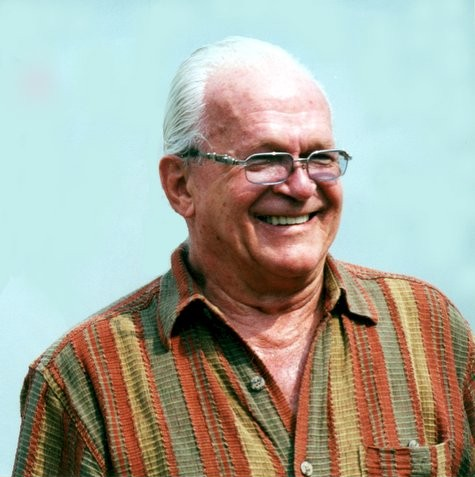
Bob Shane (1952), singer and guitarist

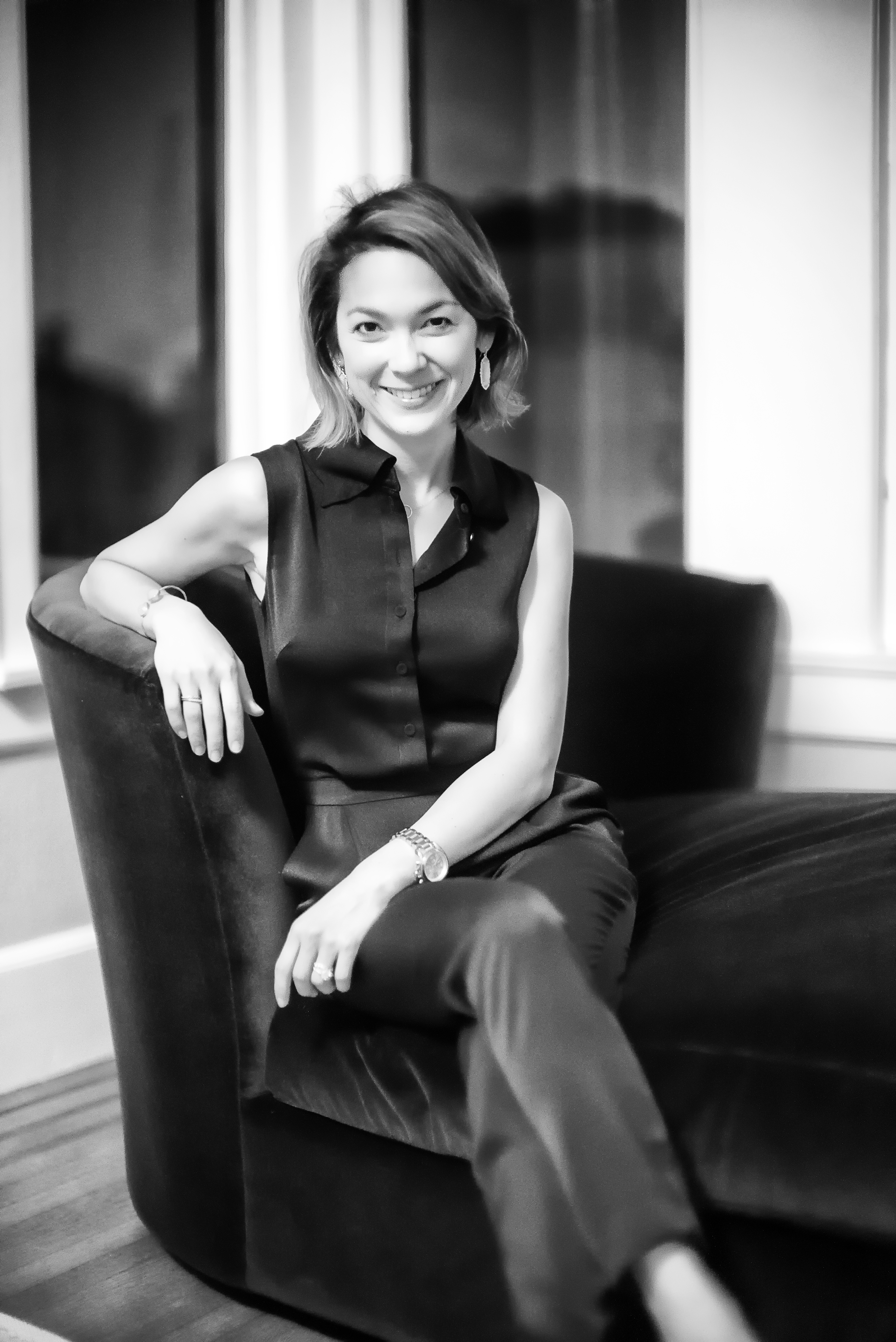
Emily Chang (1998), journalist

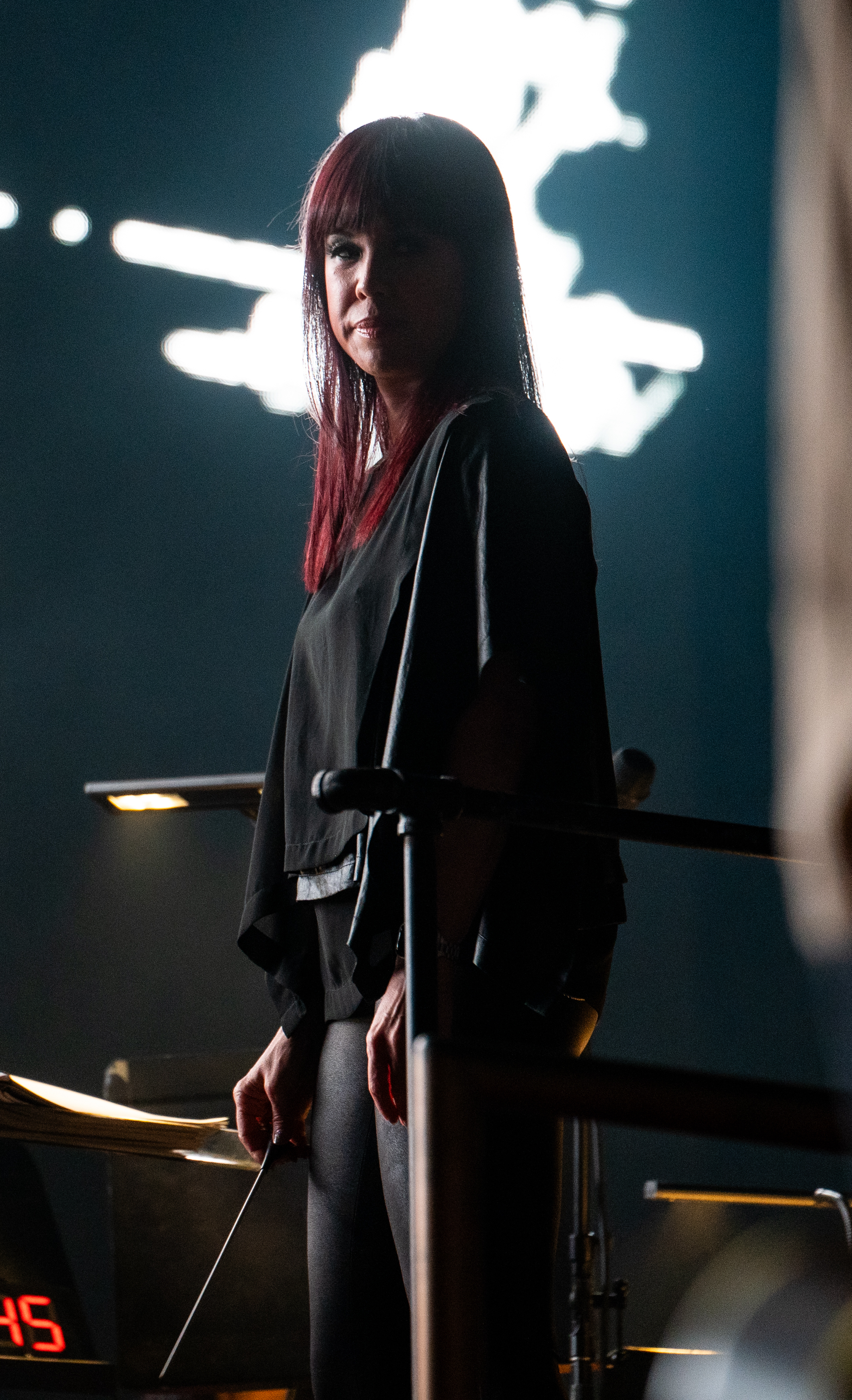
Sarah Hicks (1989), orchestra conductor

=== In public leadership ===
Punahou has produced many leaders in the government of Hawaii. Barack Obama (1979) was the 44th President of the United States. He attended Punahou from 5th grade until graduation.

Sanford Dole (1864) was President of the brief Republic of Hawaii, then Governor of Hawaii. Walter Frear (1881) and Lawrence M. Judd (1905) were also Governors.

Democratic Lt. Governor Brian Schatz (1990) was appointed U.S. Senator to complete Daniel Inouye's final term. Republican U.S. Senator Connecticut Hiram Bingham III (1892) was also elected governor of Connecticut. Otis Pike (1939*), Democratic Congressman from New York, chaired the Pike Committee investigating Richard Nixon. Republican Charles Djou (1988) recently finished Neil Abercrombie's term as Congressman from Hawaii. At least three other Punahou graduates have represented Hawaii in the U.S. House.

President Dwight Eisenhower appointed Judge Elbert Tuttle (1914) to lead the federal court that desegregated the South (the Fifth Circuit Four). United States Department of Health, Education, and Welfare Secretary John W. Gardner (1929*) was President Lyndon Johnson's architect of the Great Society. Tuttle and Gardner were awarded the Presidential Medal of Freedom.

Sun Yat-Sen, the Founding Father of the Republic of China (esteemed by Taiwan as well as pre- and post-communist mainland China), attended Punahou (Oahu College) for a semester of study after graduating from Iolani School.

Pierre Omidyar, billionaire founder of ebay, founded The Intercept and other public-affairs websites.

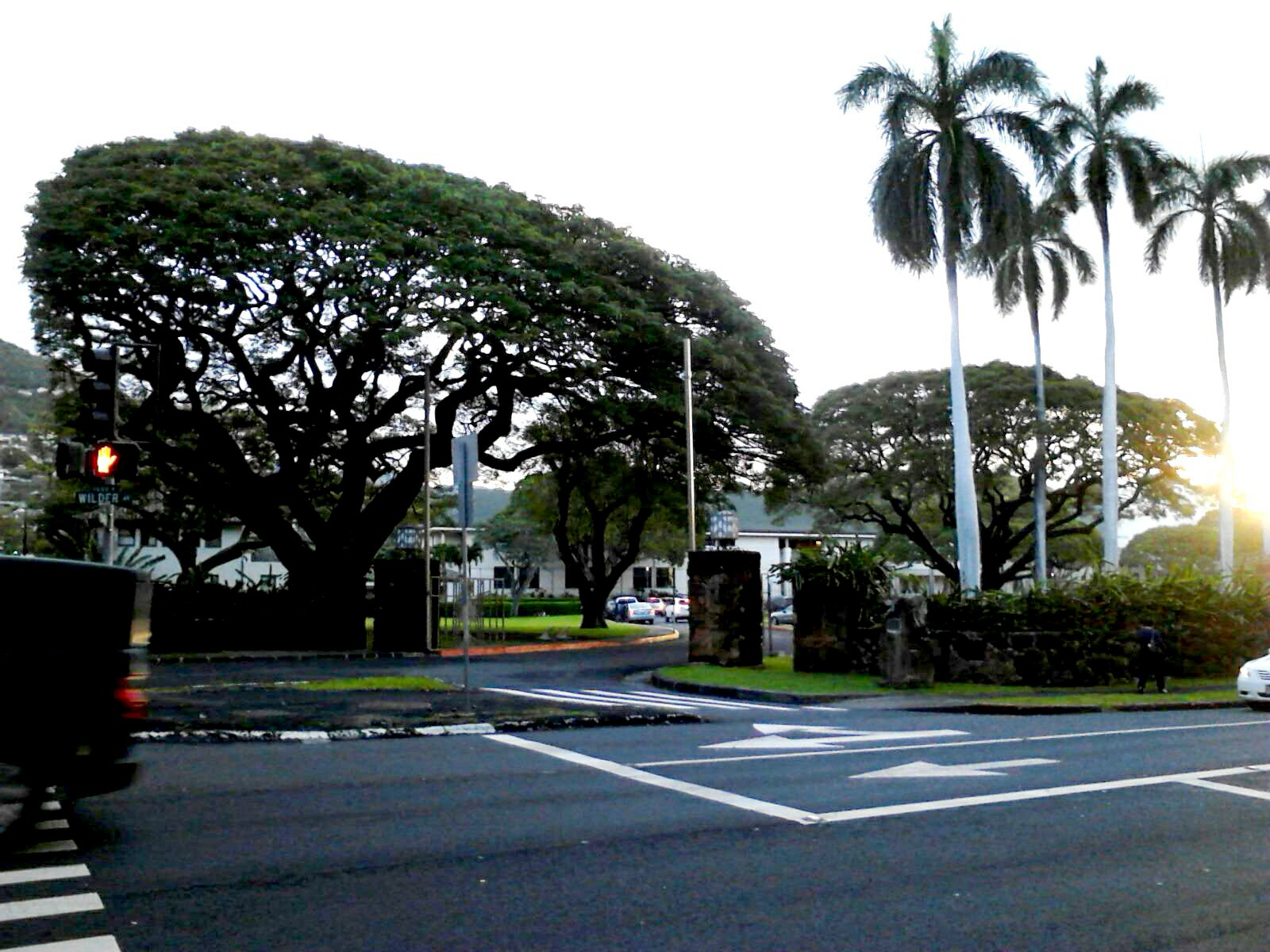
The Makai Gate at the intersection of Punahou Street and Wilder Street

=== In athletics ===
Alexander Cartwright III (1869) and his classmates were some of the earliest players of baseball (Alexander Cartwright, Jr., the official inventor of the game, spent the end of his life in Honolulu). The school claims at least one former pitcher and a former first baseman in Major League Baseball, and nine minor leaguers. All-American Glenn Goya (1973) was an NCAA batting title winner.

Pauahi Hall, completed in 1896, designed by Charles William Dickey

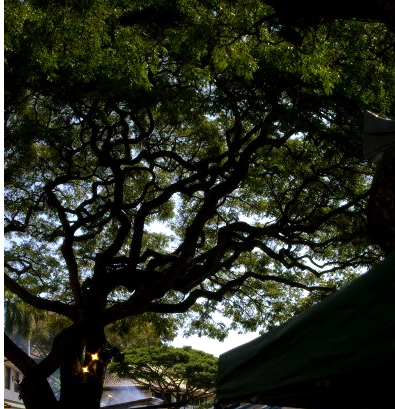
One of the many large, old monkey pod trees on campus

=== In academia ===
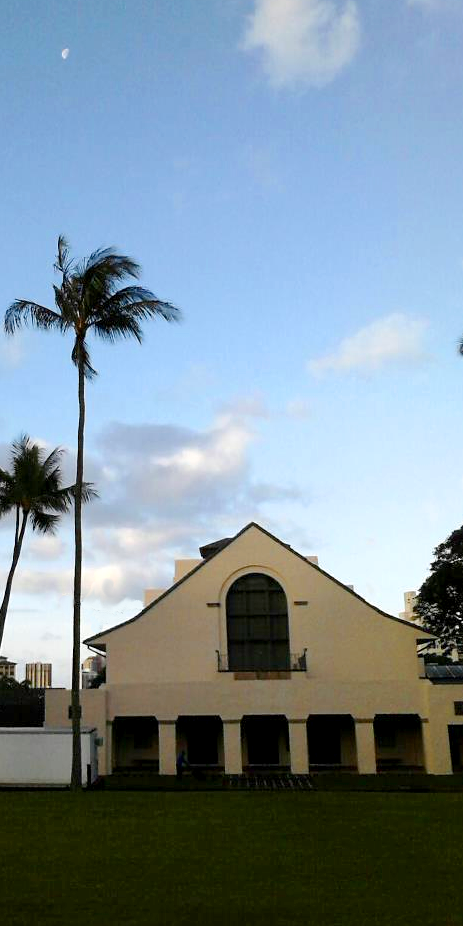
Historic Dillingham Hall, used for student performances

John W. Gardner taught at Stanford University and Hiram Bingham III at Harvard University, Princeton University and Yale University. Barack Obama lectured on Constitutional Law at the University of Chicago.

Punahou alumni include endowed professors at University of California, Berkeley, Stanford University, University of California, Los Angeles, Duke University, University of Illinois, University of Notre Dame, Purdue University, and Boston University, and research professors of medicine at UCSF, University of California, Los Angeles, University of California, San Diego, University of Southern California, Stanford University, Harvard University, Columbia University, Duke University, Indiana University, University of Texas, University of Maryland, University of Pittsburgh, Walter Reed Army Medical Center, and Baylor College of Medicine. John Lie (1978) wrote six books on Asian cultures, Patrick Vinton Kirch (1968) wrote nine books on Polynesian cultures, and Fred Hoxie (1965) wrote 20 books on Native American peoples. Jesuit Father Robert Spitzer, SJ (1970) was the president of Gonzaga University. William Richards Castle, Jr. (1896) was a Harvard University Overseer. Mount Rex is named for atmospheric science pioneer Lieutenant Commander Dan Rex (1933*).

== Alma Mater ==
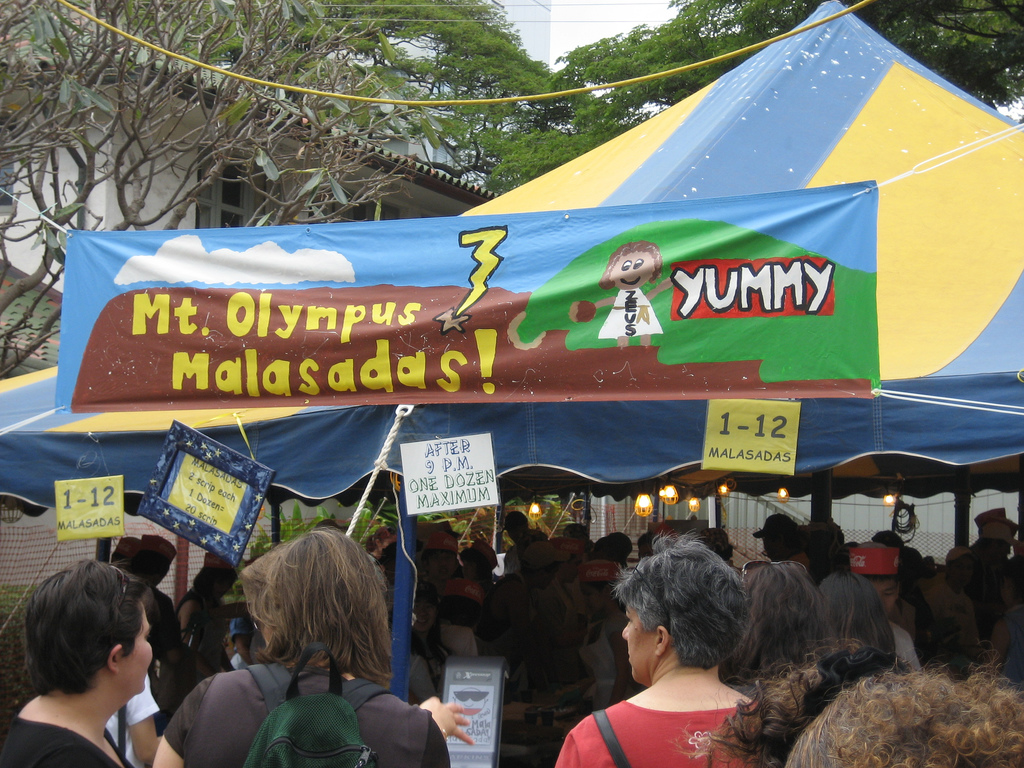
School carnival in 2007

Oʻahu A

Oʻahu a, Oʻahu a
Punahou, our Punahou;
Mau a Mau, oh mau a mau,
Punahou, our Punahou.

Throughout the years we've shown our light,
We glory in Oʻahu's might;
The Buff and Blue's a glorious sight,
Punahou, our Punahou.

The song is sung to the tune of Maryland, My Maryland, also known as "O Tannenbaum". The lyrics are taken from a poem, "Oahu Wa," by then student Wilhelm Albert Gartner (1902).

== See also ==
- List of Punahou School alumni
