= Hanalani Schools =

Private school in Hawai'i, United States

Location
- 94-294 Anania Drive; Mililani, Hawaiʻi 96789; United States
- 21.440337°N 158.009082°W

Information
- Type: Private Preparatory Day (Primary and Secondary)
- Motto: Love God. Love Others. Challenge Yourself
- Established: 1952
- Principal: Upper School: Mr. Michael David, Lower School: Mrs. Bonnie Lee
- Staff: 100 (approx. in total)
- Faculty: 70
- Grades: K3-12
- Enrollment: 720 (approx.)
- Campus: Suburban
- Campus size: 6 acres (approx.)
- Colors: Purple and Gold
- Athletics: www.hanalani.org/athletics
- Athletics conference: Interscholastic League of Honolulu (ILH), Christian School Athletic League of Honolulu (CSAL)
- Mascot: Strongman (Hawaiian Petroglyph)
- Nickname: Royals
- Affiliation: Independent
- Website: Official website

Hanalani Schools is a private Christian school founded in 1952 and located in Mililani, on the island of O'ahu, that offers classes for students in preschool through high school.

Hanalani is fully accredited by the American Association of Christian Schools and the Western Association of Schools and Colleges, and has approximately 720 students in total.

== History ==
Hanalani Schools began as King's School in 1952, under King's Gospel Center. Over the next two decades, the school expanded, which necessitated that students in high school grades meet at other locations around Wahiawa. In 1973, King's School was incorporated as an independent, non-denominational, non-profit organization by the State of Hawaii and renamed to "Hanalani Schools" ("Hana" meaning Work and "Lani" meaning Heaven, collectively Heaven's Work). In 1980, Hanalani Schools purchased six acres in Mililani Town; and in December 1982, the Upper School moved to a new 8-classroom building on the new Mililani campus. The Early Childhood (EC) and Elementary remained at the Wahiawa site until 1986, when Increment II, the Nishikawa Building was completed.

=== School Of The Future (SOTF) ===
In January 2008, the Hawaii Community Foundation (HCF) and the Hawaii Association of Independent Schools (HAIS) began exploring the ramifications of the changing global economy on the education practices in Hawaii's schools. As a result of this discussion, the Schools of the Future (SOTF) Initiative was launched in 2009.

SOTF is a five-year, capacity-building initiative designed to transform the learning environments and teaching strategies of independent schools to better prepare students for work and citizenship in the 21st century. A cohort of schools was selected in 2009 and although their approaches to this issue have varied greatly, they have largely focused on student-centered, project, or inquiry-based learning that actively incorporates technology into the curriculum.

Each school in the Initiative has a SOTF Coordinator and the SOTF Team is made up primarily of teachers and administrators who are responsible for the implementation of their project. The SOTF Team is the vanguard of what the school hopes eventually will be a 21st Century transformation of the teaching and learning environments of the entire institution."

== Affiliations ==
Accredited By Hawaii Association of Independent Schools (HAIS), Western Association of Schools and Colleges (WASC)

Licensed By Hawaii Council of Private Schools (HCPS), Department of Human Services (DHS)

Members Of Hawaii Association of Independent Schools (HAIS), National Association of Independent Schools (NAIS), Interscholastic League of Honolulu (ILH)

== Lower School ==
=== Early Childhood (EC) ===
The Early Childhood (EC) Program is broken down into K3 and K4 (ages 3–5). The EC Division builds on the learning and developmental foundation begun in the home and lays a solid foundation for future educational success by encouraging a positive school experience, developing readiness skills, and cultivating a love of learning within each child.

=== Elementary ===
The Elementary Division consists of Grades K5 to 6 and builds on the foundation laid in the Early Childhood (EC) Division. K5 is a special year of transition from the EC to the Elementary level. Developmentally, K5 students are still much like preschool children; however they mature quickly during the school year and develop increasingly higher levels of individual responsibility and self-control that are needed to be successful in first grade and beyond. Elementary teachers design exciting developmental opportunities that address a variety of learning styles and emphasize a practical hands-on approach to learning using manipulative, experiments, technology, and demonstrations. The school's curriculum is based on three pillars: Core Knowledge, Critical Skills, and Christian Character, which is referred to as Academics +. Core Knowledge material is used to create learning opportunities for 21st Century Skills: critical and analytical thinking, creativity and adaptability, communication skills (written, oral, digital, arts), collaboration skills, citizenship in a digital world, and cultural competency.

=== Athletics ===
Lower School students in grades 4-6 compete interscholastically through the Christian School Athletic League (CSAL), a sports league comprising religiously affiliated elementary and preparatory schools on Oʻahu. Hanalani fields around 8 teams each year in basketball and volleyball for both girls and boys. Hanalani also offers summer sports programs including Track & Field, Volleyball, and Basketball.

== Upper School ==
The Upper School (US) Division is made up of Grades 7-12 and is designed as a university preparatory program. Hanalani promotes academic and personal excellence through establishing a Christian worldview, Christian Character, and 21st Century Skills to be effective community leaders. The 21st Century Skills include critical and analytical thinking, creativity and adaptability, communication skills (written, oral, digital, arts), collaborative leadership skills, citizenship in a digital world, and cultural competency.

=== Athletics ===
Hanalani Schools has been a member of the Interscholastic League of Honolulu (ILH) since 2001. Student-athletes compete on nearly 40 teams in 9 different sports: basketball, bowling, cross country, golf, swimming, track & field, tennis, air-riflery, and volleyball.

Hanalani is also a member of Pac-Five Athletics, a consortium of independent schools on Oʻahu that join to field teams for certain competitive sports in the ILH. Hanalani athletes are eligible to compete with Pac-Five in sports that Hanalani does not offer, including football, baseball, soccer, wrestling, softball, canoe paddling, and judo.

The mission of the Athletic Department is to "develop students in leadership, sportsmanship, and Christian character so that they may honor God through their lives." They do this by "Transforming Ordinary Students Into Lifelong Champions by Training Their Spirit, Soul, and Body."

In 2018-2019 Hanalani Athletic's achievements include: HHSAA Cross Country State Champion- Adam Harder, ILH Cross Country Coach of the Year- Jeremy Honold, ILH Girls Basketball Division 2 Coach of the Year- Charles Hiers, and numerous other team and individual achievements.

In February 2020, the girls Varsity Basketball team won the HHSAA Division II title. Hanalani upset top seed Mid-Pacific 40–37 to claim the division two title.

==== Facilities ====
The Student Activity Center (SAC) is a two-story multipurpose building that was constructed on the campus in 2000. It houses a regulation basketball court, an indoor weight training space, a conference center, several classrooms, a performance stage, and the Cooke Foundation Fine Arts Center. Adjacent to the SAC is a partially-enclosed outdoor practice court referred to as the Sprung due to the tensioned membrane fabric structure manufactured by Sprung Instant Structures that surrounds the court.

==== HMSA Kaimana Award ====
In 2016, Hanalani was the HMSA Kaimana Award recipient in the Small School category in the ILH. Award recipients are determined using a points-based system across five categories, three of which are specific to the school's athletic program.

== Robotics ==
Hawaii Regional Botball Champions

Year	Title	Awards
2018	1st	Outstanding Overall Design Trophy
2017	1st	Outstanding Overall Design Trophy
2016	1st	Outstanding Documentation Certificate
2015 (0052)	1st	Outstanding Overall Design Trophy
2014 (0052)	1st	Outstanding Overall Design Certificate
2013 (0487)	3rd	Overall Judge's Choice Trophy
2013 (0052)	1st	Outstanding Overall Design Trophy
2012 (04870)	2nd	Outstanding Engineering Certificate
2012 (0052)	1st	Most Effective Strategy Certificate/ Outstanding Documentation Trophy
2011	1st	Overall Judge's Choice Trophy/ Outstanding Documentation Trophy
2010	1st	Overall Judge's Choice Trophy/ Outstanding Documentation Trophy
2009	2nd	Best Engineering Certificate
2008	2nd	Beat Engineering Certificate
2007	6th	Best Engineering Certificate/ Rookie of the Year Certificate

International Botball Champions

Year	Title	Awards
2018	8th	
2017	2nd	
2016	2nd	Seeding, Double Elimination, Overall
2015 (0052)	10th	Super Seeding Second Place Trophy/ Alliance Challenge First Place Trophy
2014 (0052)	13th	Outstanding use of Sensors Certificate
2012 (0487)	3rd	Excellence in Engineering Certificate
2012 (0052)	8th	
2011	1st	Outstanding Engineering Certificate
2010	1st	Outstanding Documentation Certificate
2009	2nd	Overall Judge's Choice Trophy
2008	10th	
2007	5th	Best Engineering Certificate

The International Botball Tournament is hosted by the Global Conference on Educational Robotics (GCER). Hanalani won the 2010 and 2011 International Tournament.

VEX IQ Competitions

Year	Award
2019 Windward Invitational	Judges Award
2016 (52A)	State Qualification
2015 (52B)	State Qualification

== Fine Arts ==
=== Art ===
K5-6th Grade Art

Intermediate Art I and II

Art I (Two-dimensional art)

Art II (Three-dimensional art)

Art III (Studio class)

=== Debate and Speech ===
Awards won in the Hawaii Speech League:

Awards	2014	2013
Program Reading	1st Place	3rd & 5th Place
Original Oratory	6th Place	

=== Music ===
For the past ten years Hanalani Schools has been participating in the Fine Arts experience through involvement in Hawaii All State Choir and choir festivals, playing in the Hawaii All State Marching band at both the Rose Parade and Macy's Thanksgiving Day Parade, and traveling to California every other year to perform at Knott's Berry Farm and Disneyland. In recent years, they have also traveled to Walt Disney World and Universal Studios to perform.

== Notable alumni ==
- Lynn Finnegan, member of the Hawaii House of Representatives
