= Island Pacific Academy =

Coordinates: 21.333083°N 158.080194°W

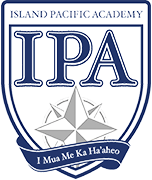
- 909 Haumea Street; Kapolei, Hawaii 96707; United States

Information
- Type: Private, independent, college-prep
- Motto: I Mua Me Ka Ha'aheo (Go Forward With Confidence)
- Established: September 13, 2004
- Head of school: Gerald Teramae
- Grades: K-12
- Gender: Co-Ed
- Age range: 5–18 years old
- Enrollment: 585
- Colors: Navy Blue, Gold and Silver
- Athletics conference: Interscholastic League of Honolulu (ILH)
- Nickname: Navigators
- Team name: IPA Navigators and Pac-5 Wolfpack
- Accreditation: Hawaiʻi Association of Independent Schools (HAIS); Western Association of Schools and Colleges (WASC)
- Website: Island Pacific Academy

Island Pacific Academy (IPA) is a private, independent, co-educational, college-preparatory school serving grades K-12, with a current enrollment of approximately 550 students. Located in Kapolei, Hawaii, IPA was founded in 2004 and enrolled its first students in September 2004.

IPA's team name is the Navigators. The school motto is "I Mua Me Ka Ha'aheo", which translates from Hawaiian as "Go Forward with Confidence".

== Campus ==
Approximately 88 faculty/staff and 590 students work and learn in two buildings, one for the Elementary division (grades K to 5) and one for the Secondary division (grades 6–12), located on three acres in Kapolei.

=== Elementary Division ===
The Elementary building encompasses 28,000 sq ft (2,600 m^{2}) on two floors, and includes a science room, music room, world languages room, technology lab, and visual arts studio as well as academic classrooms, all with wireless internet connectivity. The lower school opened its doors to students on September 13, 2004. The building supports students in kindergarten to grade 5.

=== Secondary Division ===
The Secondary building has approximately 40,000 sq ft (3,700 m^{2}) on three floors. In addition to classrooms and the main office complex, it includes two art studios, a ceramics studio, recording studio, music classroom, a multi-purpose room used as a cafeteria and auditorium, Middle School (grades 6–8) science lab, three Upper School (grades 9–12) science labs, and a student center. All classrooms have wireless internet connectivity.

In 2019, IPA installed a photovoltaic (PV) panel array over its lower level parking lot in a shift to clean energy.

== History ==
Island Pacific Academy enrolled its first students in September 2004, under the leadership of the Founding Headmaster, Dr. Daniel White.

In 2004 and 2006 the school completed construction of its two classroom and office buildings. In 2009, Island Pacific Academy Foundation purchased the three-acre property at 909 Haumea Street from an affiliate of the James Campbell Company.

IPA graduated its first class of 45 seniors in May 2010.

In 2015, it sold the property to an affiliate of Watumull Properties Corp, WPC Haumea LLC.

In 2024, Island Pacific Academy faced backlash from parents following the resignation of the then current principal, Gail Vanatta.

== Academics ==
=== Elementary Division ===
The Elementary School academic program includes art, music, design technology, world languages (Mandarin and ʻŌlelo Hawaiʻi), computer science, and PE. Of special note is the SEED (Science, Environment, Engineering, and Design) program in which all students from Kindergarten through grade 5 participate. This program engages students in hands-on engineering activities as they work together to apply STEM knowledge to real-world problems.

=== Secondary Division ===
The Middle School curriculum includes courses in Mathematics, Sciences, Humanities, English, Design Thinking, Physical Education, Visual and Performing Arts (music, drama, ceramics, visual arts), and World Languages. Grade 6 students take a trimester each of Japanese, ʻŌlelo Hawaiʻi, and Spanish. In grades 7 and 8, students select one of the three languages to take as a full-year class. In the Upper School, students take courses in Mathematics, Sciences, Humanities, English, Design Thinking, Physical Education, Visual and Performing Arts, and World Languages. Students may choose from a variety of courses which includes Digital Storytelling, Computer Science, Engineering, Jewelry Making, and Publishing. Advanced Placement courses are offered in multiple school subjects.

== Affiliations ==
- Accredited by the Hawaiʻi Association of Independent Schools (HAIS) and the Western Association of Schools and Colleges (WASC)
- Member of the Hawaiʻi Association of Independent Schools (HAIS), the National Association of Independent Schools (NAIS), and the Interscholastic League of Honolulu (ILH)

== Athletics ==
Island Pacific Academy (IPA) is a member of the Interscholastic League of Honolulu (ILH). IPA student-athletes compete on 41 teams in 13 sports at the intermediate, junior varsity, and varsity levels. Sports include air riflery, basketball, bowling, cross country, golf, swimming, tennis, track and field, and volleyball. IPA is also a member of Pac-Five, an athletic consortium of small independent schools that join to field teams for the ILH. IPA student-athletes participate on Pac-Five teams in baseball, football, soccer, and softball.

More than 60% of students in grades 7-12 participate in the athletics program, with 50% female student-athletes and 50% male student-athletes. Many students participate in more than one sport.
