= Interscholastic League of Honolulu =

Coordinates: 21.3047988°N 157.8530661°W

- Conference: HHSAA
- Founded: 1909
- Sports fielded: 37
- No. of teams: 20
- Region: Hawaii (ul5Hawaii]]
- Website: ilhsports.com

The Interscholastic League of Honolulu (ILH) is an athletic activity league whose membership is primarily private secondary schools in Honolulu, Hawaiʻi. The ILH has 20 member schools with over 13,000 student athletes participating in 37 different sports including cross country, track and field, swimming and diving, football, baseball, basketball, soccer, canoe paddling, kayaking, air riflery, water polo, judo, cheerleading, and sailing.

== History ==
The ILH was founded in 1909 with Punahou, Kamehameha and McKinley High School making up the original membership. A number of public and private institutions joined soon after to bolster membership. In 1911 the ILH passed a rule stating that all players must be students, after schools supplemented their teams with recent graduates.

Along with the large number of private institutions that composed the membership of the ILH, there were five public high schools situated in Honolulu that were original members of the league: Farrington High School, Kaimuki High School, McKinley High School, Roosevelt High School and Kalani High School. In 1970, these five schools left the ILH to join the Oahu Interscholastic Association, a league now comprising all the public secondary schools on the island, leaving the ILH membership composed primarily with private institutions.

== Operations ==
The Interscholastic League of Honolulu is governed by a set of policies that cover aspects such as: eligibility of students, age limits, academic standing, sports participation, outside participation rules and a codified transfer policy between teams.

As a large number of schools in the ILH have very small enrollment numbers, many schools cannot field teams that require a large number of players such as football, baseball, wrestling, etc. In response to this problem, and to give their students a chance to compete in these sports, these schools pool their players together and play under the moniker "Pac-Five". Pac-Five participates in many of the various sports offered by the ILH. Unfortunately for this combined athletic program, the athletes are not allowed to participate and score as a team in state championship individual sports. In this case, the athletes from each school must compete under their own school name, making it extremely difficult to win team awards due to the failure to meet the minimum number of athletes participating in an event in order to achieve a high team score.

The Interscholastic League of Honolulu had used Aloha Stadium as the primary venue for ILH football games until its closure in 2020. Previously, the ILH had used Honolulu Stadium until that closed in 1975. ILH football games are now played at their respective campuses with the exception of Damien, Saint Louis, and PAC-5.

== League events ==
Tournaments hosted by the Interscholastic League of Honolulu have always been some of the most popular events in the State of Hawaii. Events such as the old Thanksgiving Day football game would annually draw crowds upwards of 20,000 to Honolulu Stadium to watch the league crown its champion. Although the Turkey Day Game has long been defunct, avid fans still often commute from neighbor islands to O'ahu to attend conference games in a wide range of sports.

== Member institutions ==
=== Current full members ===
There are currently 20 full member programs:

Institution	Location	Founded	Type	Nickname	School Colors
Assets School	Honolulu, Hawaii	1969	Private	Admirals	Red, White & Blue
Christian Academy (Honolulu)	Honolulu, Hawaii	1981	Private	Patriots	Blue & White
Damien Memorial School	Honolulu, Hawaii	1962	Private	Monarchs	Purple & Gold
Hanalani Schools	Mililani, Hawaii	1978	Private	Royals	Purple & Gold
Hawaii Baptist Academy	Honolulu, Hawaii	1949	Private	Eagles	Black, Gold & White
Hawaiian Mission Academy	Honolulu, Hawaii	1920	Private	Knights	Blue and White
Iolani School	Honolulu, Hawaii	1863	Private	Raiders	Red, Black & White
Island Pacific Academy	Kapolei, Hawaii	2003	Private	Navigators	Navy Blue, Silver, & Gold
Kamehameha Schools-Kapalama	Honolulu, Hawaii	1887	Private	Warriors	Blue & White
La Pietra: Hawaii School for Girls	Honolulu, Hawaii	1964	Private	Panthers	Royal & Sky Blue
Le Jardin Academy	Kailua, Hawaii	1961	Private	Bulldogs	Blue & White
Maryknoll School	Honolulu, Hawaii	1927	Private	Spartans	Maroon & Gold
Mid-Pacific Institute	Honolulu, Hawaii	1865	Private	Owls	Green & White
Pacific Buddhist Academy	Honolulu, Hawaii	2003	Private	Dragons	Teal, Indigo & Gold
Punahou School	Honolulu, Hawaii	1841	Private	Buff N' Blue	Buff & Blue
Sacred Hearts Academy	Honolulu, Hawaii	1909	Private	Lancers	White & Gold
Saint Andrew's Schools	Honolulu, Hawaii	1867	Private	Pride	Red & White
Saint Louis School	Honolulu, Hawaii	1846	Private	Crusaders	Red & Blue
University Laboratory School	Honolulu, Hawaii	1947	Public charter school	Jr. Rainbows	Green & White
Pac-Five	Honolulu, Hawaii	1974	Athletic alliance	Wolfpack	Texas Orange & White

=== Former full members ===
Institution	Location	Founded	Type	Nickname	School Colors	Year Left
Academy of the Pacific	Honolulu, Hawaii	1961	Private	Dolphins	Blue & White	2013 (Note: School closed)
Farrington High School	Honolulu, Hawaii	1936	Public	Governors	Maroon & White	1970 (Note: Current OIA member)
Ho'ala School	Wahiawa, Hawaii	1986	Private	Hurricanes	Maroon & White	
Kaimuki High School	Honolulu, Hawaii	1944	Public	Bulldogs	Green & Gold	1970
Kalani High School	Honolulu, Hawaii	1958	Public	Falcons	Red & White	1970
Lanakila Baptist School	Ewa Beach, Hawaii	1969	Private	Warriors	Red & White	2024
Lutheran High School	Honolulu, Hawaii	1948	Private	Lions	Navy Blue & White	2016
McKinley High School	Honolulu, Hawaii	1865	Public	Tigers	Black & Gold	1970
Roosevelt High School	Honolulu, Hawaii	1930	Public	Rough Riders	Red & Gold	1970
Saint Francis School	Honolulu, Hawaii	1924	Private	Saints	Carolina Blue & White	2019
Word of Life Academy	Honolulu, Hawaii	1993	Private	Firebrands	Navy Blue & Carolina Blue	2010
