= Assets School =

Location
- Grades K-8: 1 Ohana Nui Way, Honolulu, Hawaii; Grades 9-12: 913 Alewa Drive,Honolulu, Hawaii; United States; 21.3399°N 157.9340°W

Information
- Type: Private
- Established: 1955
- Grades: K to 12
- Student to teacher ratio: 8:1
- Colors: Red, White, blue
- Mascot: Admiral
- Website: www.assets-school.org

Assets School is a co-educational, independent K-12 school in Honolulu, Hawaii. It was established in 1955 and is the only school in the state that specializes in educating children who are gifted and/or have language-based learning differences such as dyslexia. Assets School has two campus locations in Honolulu: the lower elementary K-8 school campus is located in Honolulu near Hickam at One Ohana Nui Way (not on base), while the high school campus is located in Honolulu Liliha area at 913 Alewa Drive.

== History ==
Assets School was established in 1955 at the request of military families who needed specialized educational services for their children. Assets High School was established in 1991, with the addition of two ninth-grade students. The campus was expanded in 1999, with the help of finance from the he Charles B. Wang International Foundation including special purpose classrooms such as labs, kitchen facilities, art and drama rooms, and 25% more instructional space. The school merged with the Academy of the Pacific in 2014, and in 2015 Assets High School opened for summer school on the academy's former campus in Alewa Heights.

== Accreditation and Memberships ==
Assets School is accredited by both the Western Association of Schools and Colleges (WASC) and the Hawaii Association of Independent Schools (HAIS). Membership and affiliations include:

- Association of LD Schools (founding member)
- Hawaii Association of Independent Schools
- Hawaii Council of Private Schools
- Interscholastic League of Honolulu
- National Association of Independent Schools

== Athletics ==
Assets students in grades 7-12 participate in sports via the Interscholastic League of Honolulu (ILH) and students grades 4-6 participate in the Christian School Athletic League. Within the ILH's large team sports like football, baseball and soccer, Assets participates by banding together with other small private schools through affiliation with the PAC-5.
