= Lanakila Baptist School =

Coordinates: 21°20′28″N 158°02′08″W

- "Pursuing Christ and Academic Excellence"

Location
- Elementary School and Administration: 94-1250 Waipahu Street Waipahu, HI 96797; Secondary campus: 91-1219 Renton Road Ewa, HI 96796; Hawaii; United States

Information
- Type: Private, College-prep
- Motto: "We are more than conquerors"
- Denomination: Baptist
- Established: 1969
- President: Pastor Jose Esquibel
- Grades: K-12
- Gender: Co-ed
- Campus type: Suburban
- Colors: Red and White
- Athletics conference: Interscholastic League of Honolulu
- Mascot: Warrior
- Accreditation: Association of Christian Schools International
- Newspaper: Ka Nū Hou Maikaʻi
- Yearbook: Kalama
- Website: http://www.lbswarriors.com/

Lanakila Baptist School is a college-preparatory K-12 private school located in Honolulu County, Hawaii. It serves grades sixth through twelve and has a current enrollment of about 70 students. The student population is ethnically diverse and includes Filipinos, Caucasians, part-Hawaiians, Japanese, Hispanics, Indo-Chinese, Chinese, Samoans, and African-Americans.

It is an educational ministry of and subservient to Lanakila Baptist Church of Waipahu.

Its administrative office and elementary school building is in Waipahu while its middle and high school campus is in Ewa Villages CDP (with an Ewa postal address), 16 miles (26 km) away from downtown Honolulu.

== History ==
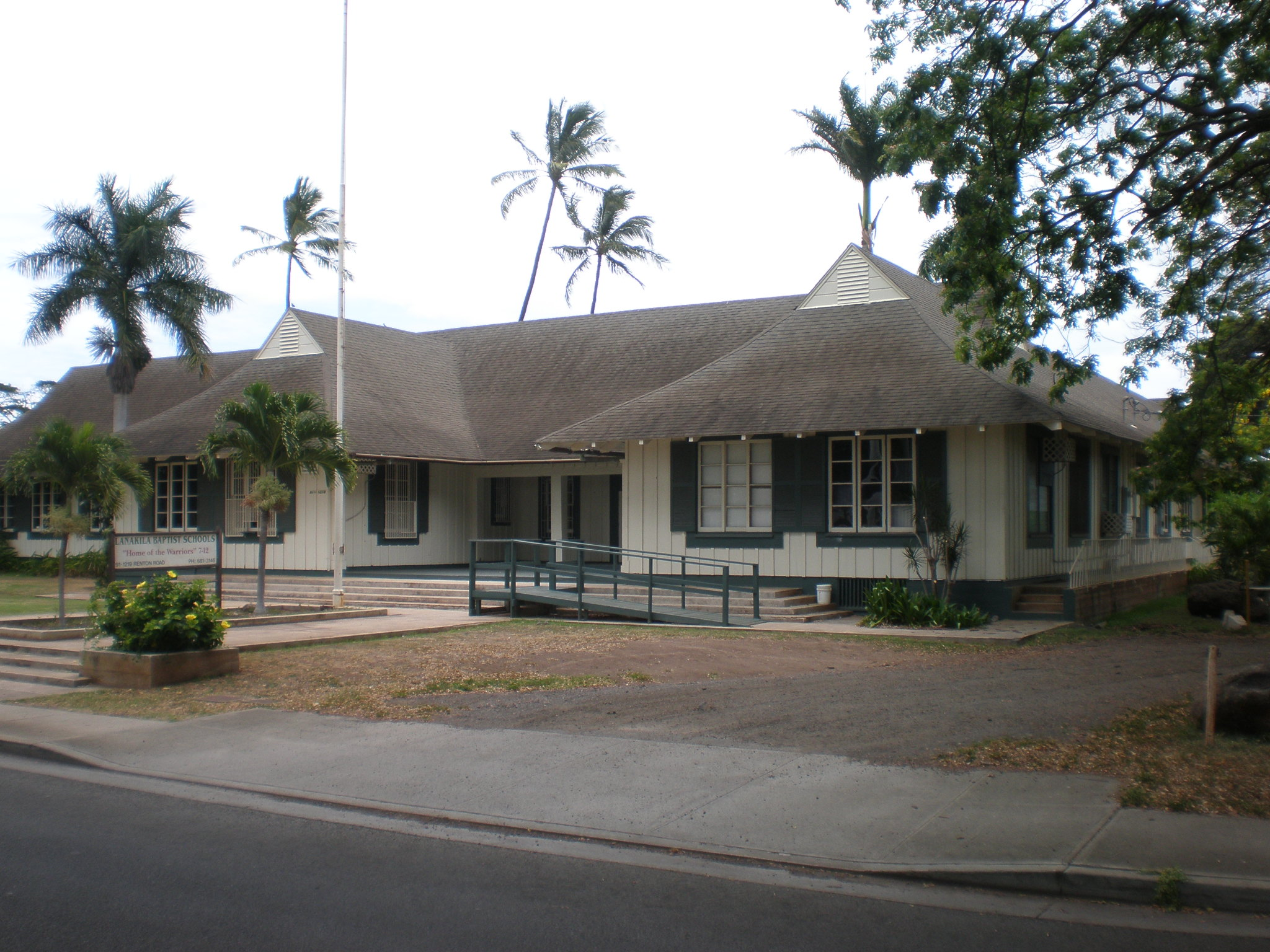
Oblique view of historic plantation building.

In 1967, under the leadership of Rev. Robert K. Knutson, Lanakila Baptist Church assumed non-profit corporation status with a board of trustees. The church began its ministry by starting a preschool on the Waipahu campus in August 1969. This ministry was discontinued after one year in favor of beginning a K-12 academic ministry. From 1970–1975, Lanakila Baptist School was "grown" into a full Primary and Secondary school, graduating its first Senior class of four in June 1975. Since that time, Lanakila has graduated hundreds of students who have gone on to military service, colleges, technical schools, and a variety of other careers.

In order to accommodate continued growth of the Christian school, in the spring of 1979, Lanakila entered into a long-term lease agreement with Campbell Estate for property located at 91-1219 Renton Road in 'Ewa. This lease has subsequently changed lessor hands from Campbell Estate to the City and County of Honolulu, but remains in effect until July 2047. In the fall of 1979, the junior and senior high school division finally had its own campus and opened its doors in 'Ewa Beach.

The school belongs to the Association of Christian Schools International and is a Licensed Member of the Hawaii Association of Independent Schools.

== Campus ==
The school is a historical site, housed in the offices of the old 'Ewa sugarcane plantation.

== Academics ==
High school students have the choice of college preparatory and general education curricula. Most of the curriculum is provided by A Beka Book, with the exception of math, which is provided by Saxon math. The course schedule consists of six main periods for Monday, Tuesday, Thursday, and Friday; each being about 53 minutes long.

In 2015, the school began integrating technology by using G Suite, then called Google Apps for Education. In 2016, LBHS further integrating by technology by introducing ebooks as a better alternative to hardback books—with the exception of books that require writing, like English and foreign language books. The school also introduced Chromebooks to be a crucial part of the classroom—in note-taking, with ebooks, writing compositions, and to use G Suite.

=== Graduation Requirements ===
A minimum of 26 high school credits is required for Graduation. 1 credit is equivalent to one year or two semesters. Half-credits are given for Wednesday electives and semester courses.

Middle Graduation Requirements
Courses	6th Grade	7th Grade	8th Grade
Bible	1	1	1
English	1	1	1
Social Science	1	1	1
Mathematics	1	1	1
Science	1	1	1
Physical Education	1	1	1
Wed. Electives	1	1	1

High School Graduation Requirements
Courses	9th Grade	10th Grade	11th Grade	12th Grade
Bible	1	1	1	1
English	1	1	1	1
Social Science	1	1	1	1
Mathematics	1	1	1	X
Science	1	1	1	X
Physical Education	1	X	X	X
Foreign Language (Note: Spanish I & II are the current foreign language courses available.)	X	1	1	X
Health/Guidance	X	X	X	1
Academic Electives (Note: Academic Electives are optional, except for students enrolled in the College-preparatory curriculum. They include: Adv. Math, Calculus, Physics, and Sports Condition.)	X	X	X	2
Wed. Electives	1	1	1	1

== Extracurricular activities ==
=== Clubs & Organizations ===
- National Honor Society (NHS) & National Junior Honor Society (NJHS)- Kalama Chapter
  - Minimum GPA of 3.5
- National Association of Student Councils (NASC)
  - Both School & Class Councils
  - Runs "The Oasis," a food & drink store in the school

=== Athletics ===
Lanakila Baptist School formerly belonged to the Interscholastic League of Honolulu. The Warriors left in 2023-2024 to compete in the Hawaii Sports Fellowship League. These sports include:

- Basketball (Boys & Girls)
- Volleyball (Boys & Girls)

The school also has their own Cheerleading team, which participates in Basketball games.

== Distinctions ==
- In 2016, Ka Nū Hou Maikaʻi won 2nd Place in the Private School division for Best Comic Strip.
