= Academy of the Pacific =

Private high school in Honolulu

Coordinates: 21°19.908′N 157°51.29′W

Academy of the Pacific was a private, nonsectarian co-educational high school in Honolulu CDP, Honolulu County of Hawai’i, United States. It had grades 6-12. The school closed in 2013.

== Enrollment ==
The Academy had a ratio of 15 students per class. The academy had 100 students, both young men and women.

== History ==
In 1961 the Honolulu Junior Academy was founded by a committee of educational and community leaders. Although many of the founders were Quakers, the school has never had official ties with any denomination. Classes began in two rooms at the Richards Street YWCA. In 1964 classes moved to the George Q. Cannon mansion in Nuuanu. Juniors and seniors were enrolled for the first time that year. The first edition of Holomua, the school newspaper, was also printed in 1969. In 1971 the school moved yet again to classrooms rented from the Community Church of Honolulu.

In 1979 HJA joined the ILH. At this point students began to ask, why the school was called the "Junior Academy" even though there was a class of seniors. The school was then renamed as the "Academy of the Pacific" in 1981.

Victoria Lee gave AOP her Alewa property in 1982 and the Trustees vote to buy the John Mason Young estate and turn the entire knoll of Pu'u-o-Hoku into the academy's campus.

The Board of Trustees announced in 2013 that the academy would close. In 2014 Assets School bought the Academy of the Pacific campus and moved their high school division there in 2015. At its peak AOP had enrolled 140 students.

== Academics ==
Students at all grade levels took courses in math, language arts, social studies, and health or science, meeting the minimum graduation guidelines established by the Hawai'i Department of Education. AOP students were encouraged to exceed those requirements and to earn an Honors diploma.

== Athletics ==
More than half of the student body participated in one or more inter-scholastic sports. The academy fielded teams in basketball and boys' and girls' volleyball, and was a member of the PAC-5 consortium of schools that fields joint teams in the Interscholastic League of Honolulu (ILH) sports.

== Works cited ==
- "American Dream Realty." Real Geeks, 26 Mar, 2009
- "A Village for Learning". Academy of The Pacific, AOP Online, 22 April 2009.
