= Monkey pod =

Monkey pod is a common name for several plants and may refer to:

- Samanea saman, used in woodworking
- Lecythis ollaria, found in Brazil, Guyana, and Venezuela
- Pithecellobium dulce
- Senna petersiana
