= Honolulu =

Capital and largest city in Hawaii, US

- State capital city
- City and County of Honolulu
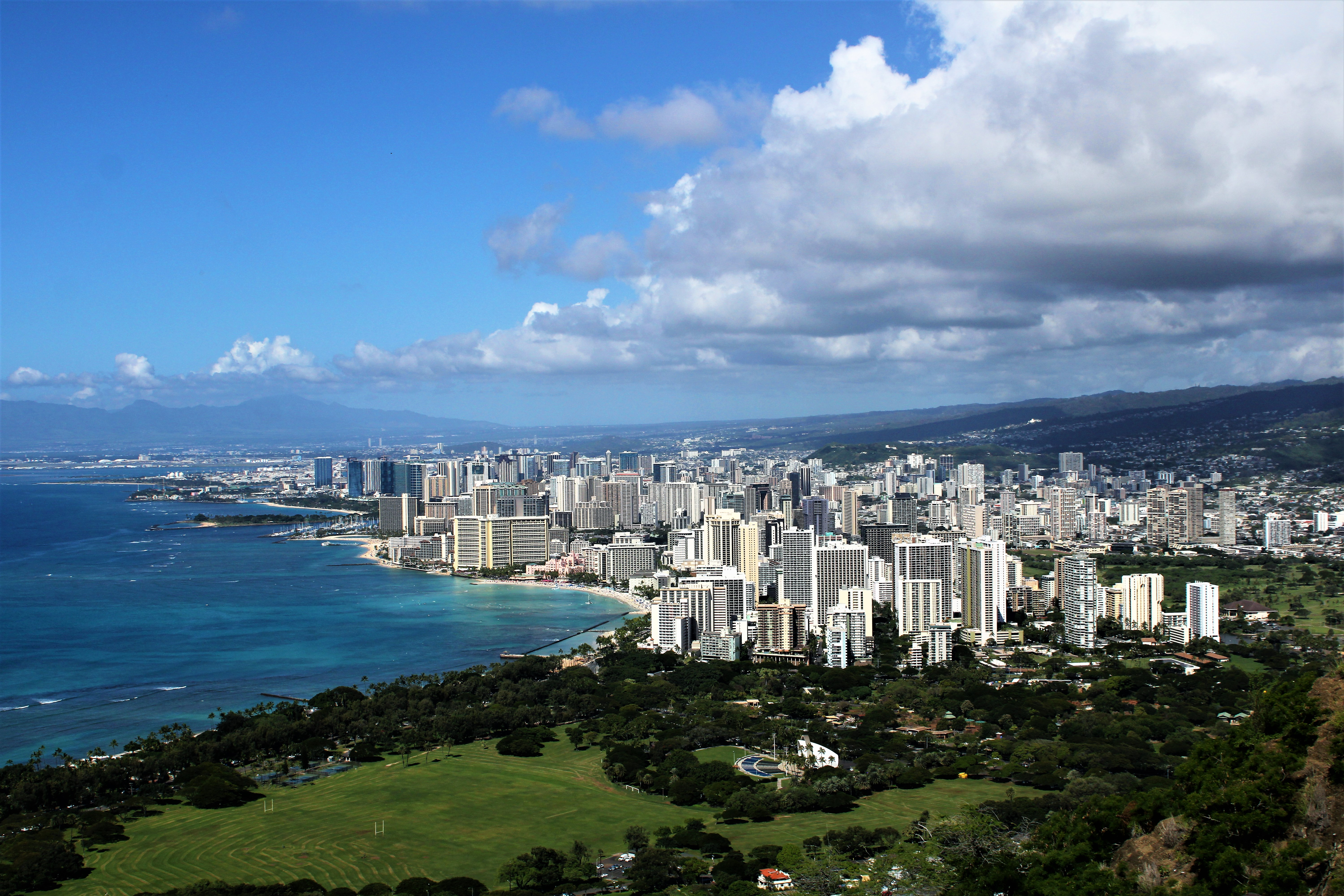
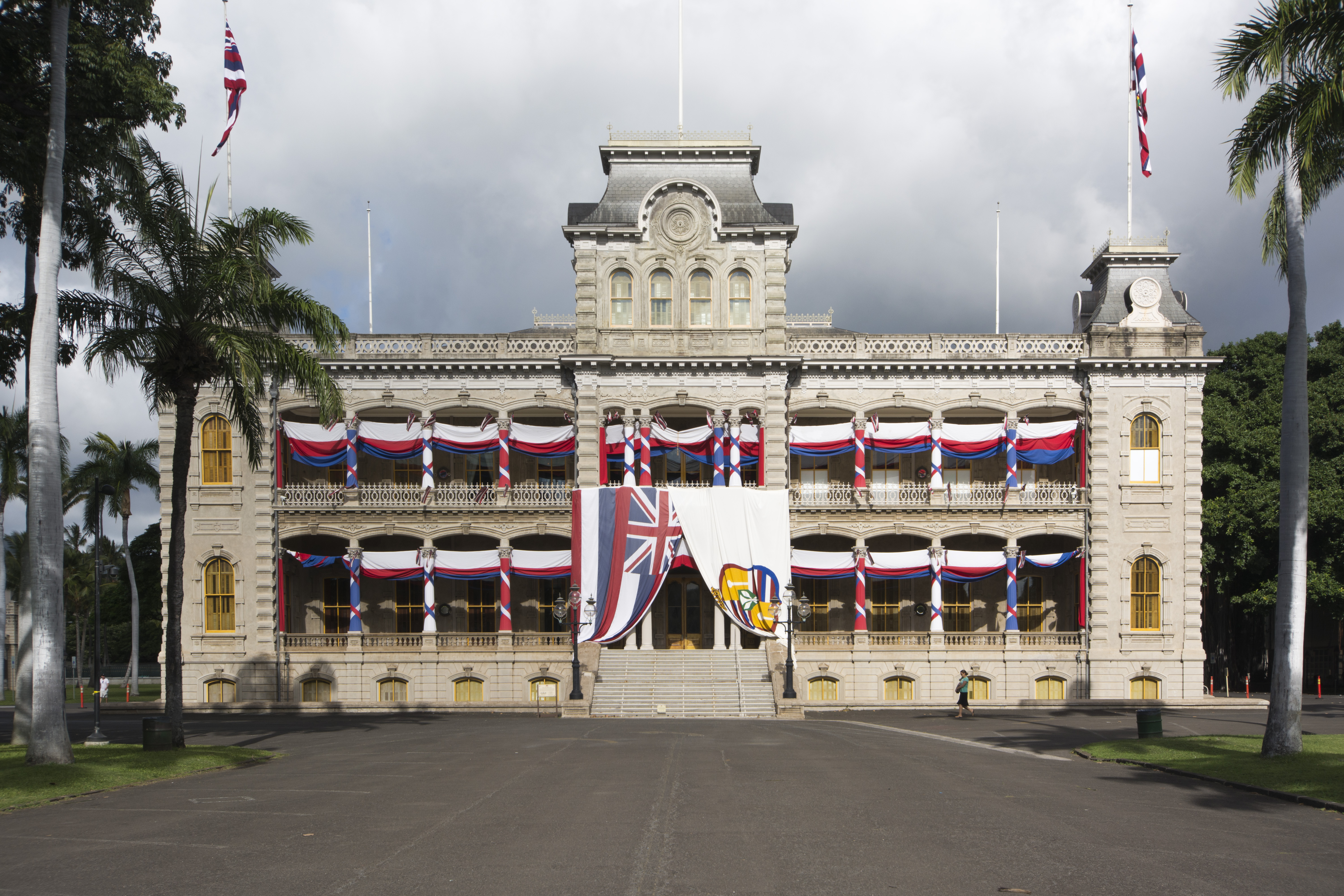
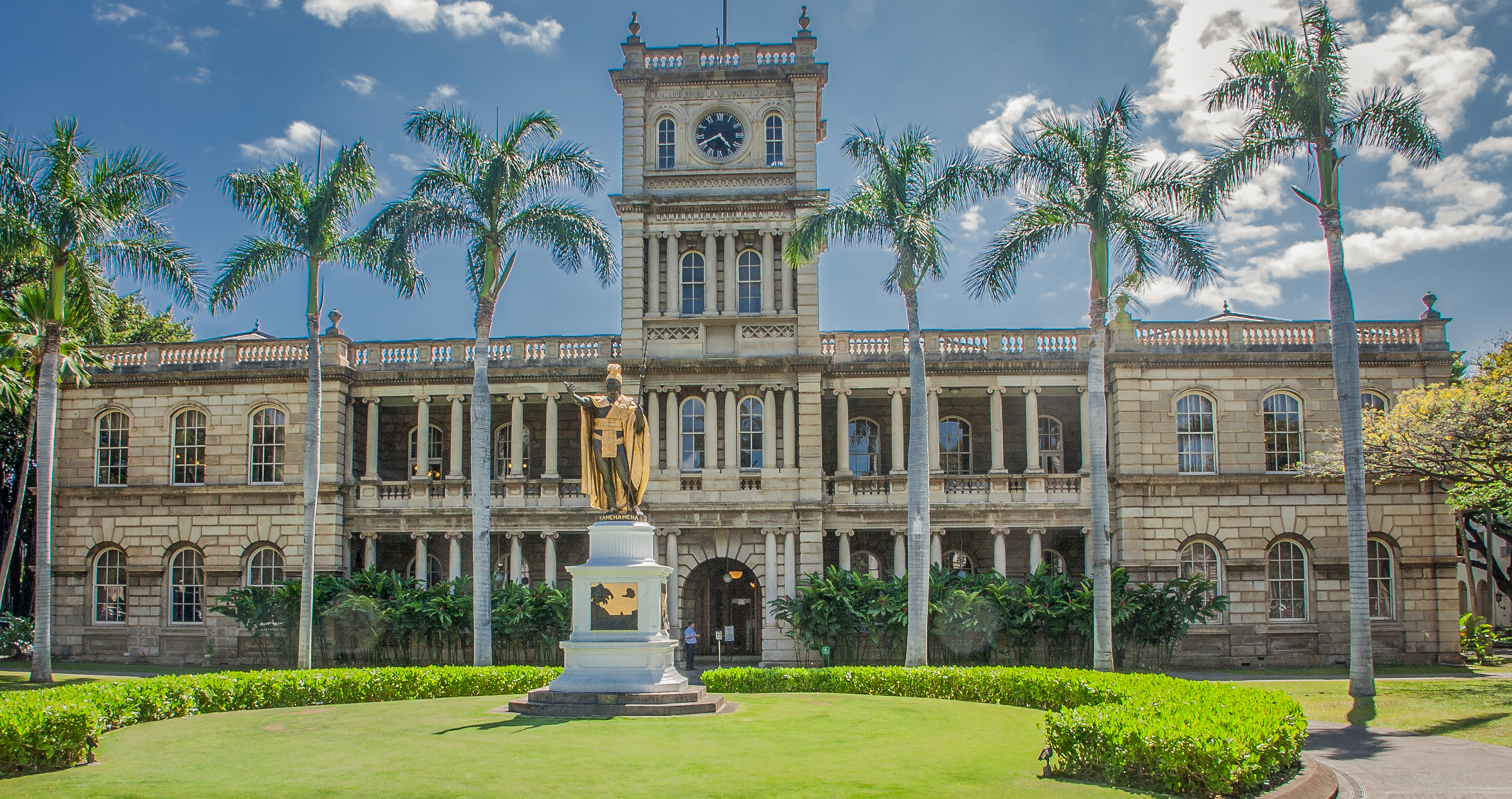
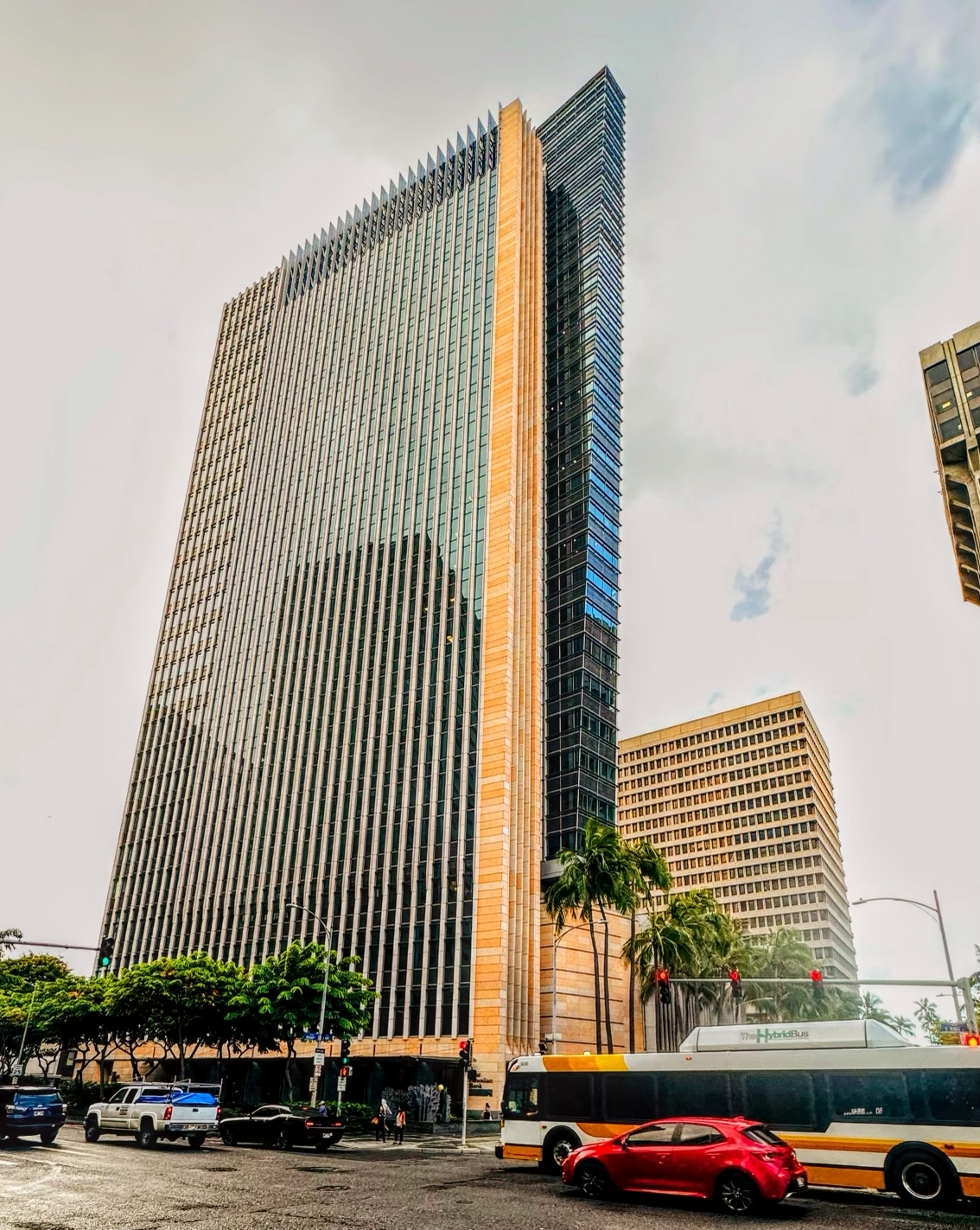
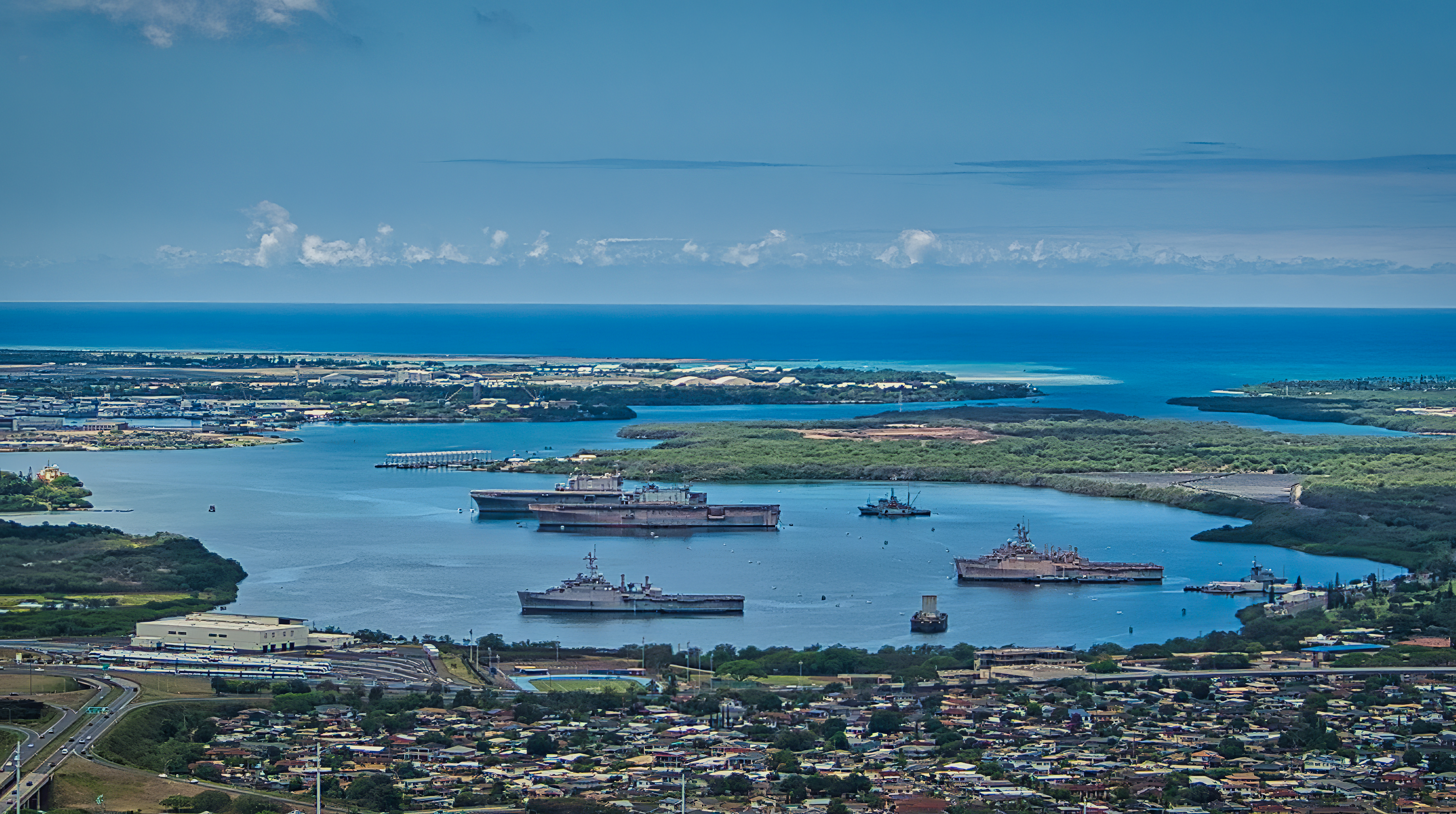
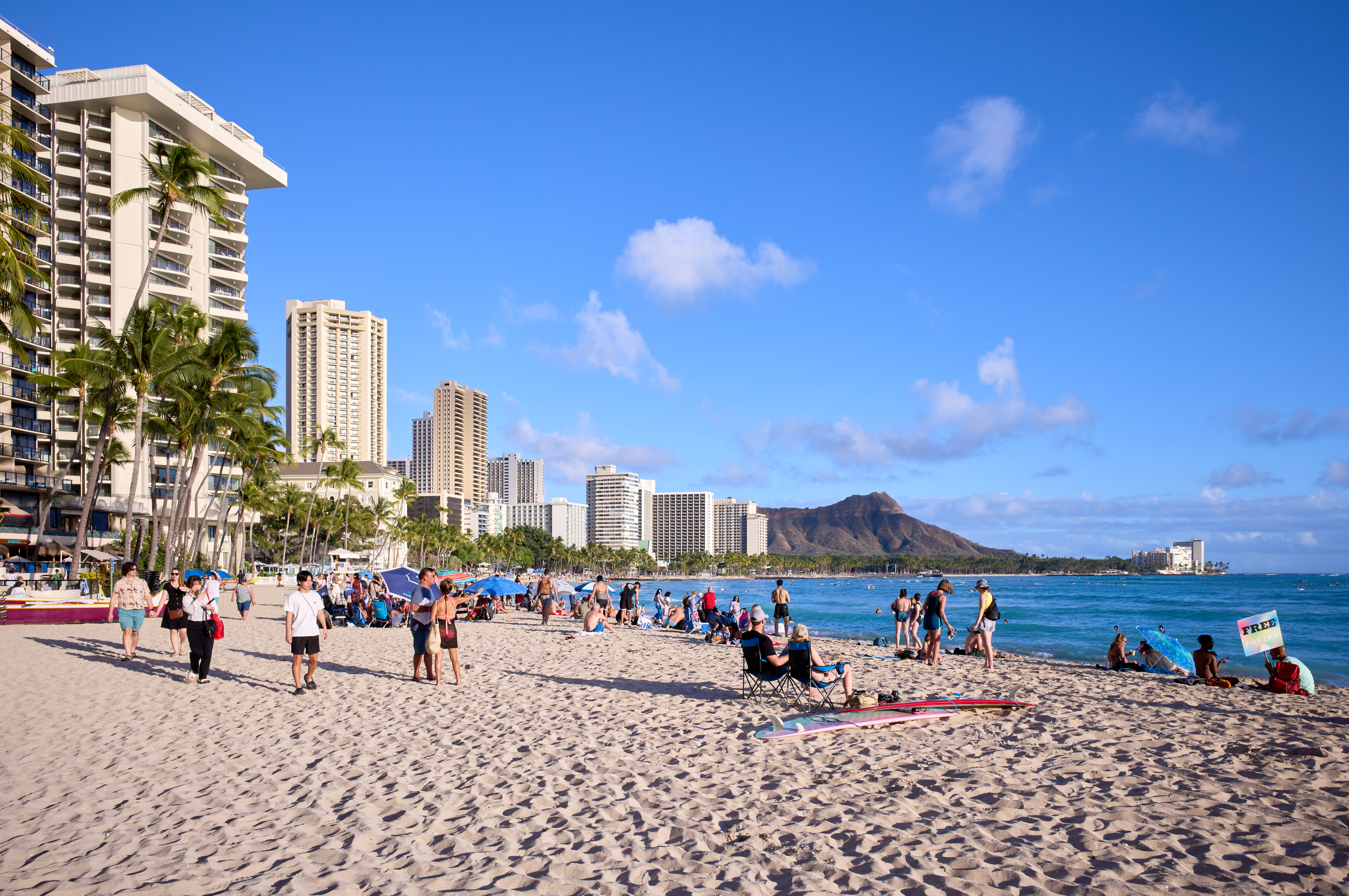
- Downtown Honolulu as seen from Diamond Head ʻIolani Palace Aliʻiōlani Hale First Hawaiian Center Pearl Harbor Waikīkī, with Diamond Head in the distance

- Flag Seal
- Nicknames: Crossroads of the Pacific, Sheltered Bay, HNL, The Big Pineapple, Paradise
- Motto: Haʻaheo No ʻO Honolulu (The Pride of Honolulu)
- Location of Urban Honolulu and East Honolulu CDPs (combined) within Honolulu County

- Location within Hawaii Location within Pacific Ocean
- Coordinates: 21°18′N 157°51′W
- Country: United States
- State: Hawaii
- County: Honolulu
- Incorporated: April 30, 1907

Government
  - Mayor: Rick Blangiardi (I)
  - Body: Honolulu City Council

Area
  - City: 68.4 sq mi (177.2 km^{2})
  - Land: 60.5 sq mi (156.7 km^{2})
  - Water: 7.9 sq mi (20.5 km^{2}) 11.5%
  - Urban: 145.0 sq mi (375.5 km^{2})
- Elevation: 16 ft (5 m)

Population (2020)
  - City: 350,964 (US: 55th)
  - Estimate (2025): 341,868 ▼
  - Density: 5,791/sq mi (2,236.1/km^{2})
  - Urban: 853,252 (US: 54th)
  - Urban density: 5,885/sq mi (2,272.4/km^{2})
  - Metro: 1,016,508 (US: 55th)
- Demonym: Honolulan

GDP
  - Metro: $81.676 billion (2023)
- Time zone: UTC−10:00 (HST)
- ZIP Codes: 96801–96826, 96828, 96830, 96836-96841, 96843-96844, 96846-96850
- Area code: 808
- FIPS code: 15-17000
- GNIS feature ID: 366212
- Website: honolulu.gov

Honolulu (/ˌhɒnəˈluːluː/ HON-ə-LOO-loo; Hawaiian: [honoˈlulu]) is the capital and most populous city of the U.S. state of Hawaii, located in the Pacific Ocean. It is the county seat of the consolidated City and County of Honolulu, situated along the southeast coast of the island of Oʻahu. The population of Honolulu was 350,964 at the 2020 census, (Note: For statistical purposes, the US Census Bureau considers Honolulu to be a census-designated place rather than a city.) dropping to an estimated 341,868 by 2025. The Urban Honolulu metropolitan area had an estimated population of just under 1 million residents in 2024 and is the 56th-largest metropolitan area in the nation.

The area's geography and Honolulu Harbor have long made it desirable as a port, accounting for the city's growth and importance in the Hawaiian archipelago and the broader Pacific region. Honolulu has been the capital of Hawaii since 1845, first as seat of the independent Hawaiian Kingdom until the kingdom's overthrow in 1893, then of the U.S. territory established after annexation in 1898, and since 1959 of the state of Hawaii. The city gained worldwide recognition following the Empire of Japan's attack on nearby Pearl Harbor on December 7, 1941, which prompted the entry of the U.S. into World War II; the harbor remains a major U.S. Navy base, hosting the United States Pacific Fleet, the world's largest naval command.

Honolulu is the westernmost and southernmost major U.S. city and state capital. It is also a hub for business, commerce, finance, hospitality, and military defense in Oceania. The city is characterized by a mix of various Asian, Western, and Pacific cultures, reflected in its diverse demography, cuisine, and traditions. Honolulu's favorable tropical climate, rich natural scenery, and extensive beaches make it a popular global destination for tourists. With nearly 1.5 million visitors in 2024, Honolulu is among the ten most visited cities in the United States. However, since the beginning of the 21st century, climate change has significantly impacted Honolulu and its tourism economy, contributing to increasing drought and water shortages, and sea level rise as well as beach and hotel flooding in Downtown Honolulu. These factors are compounded by an aging and declining population, with an exodus emigrating to the U.S. mainland.

== Etymology ==
Honolulu is Hawaiian for 'sheltered harbor' or 'calm port'; this former meaning is also reflected in the related Māori cognate toponym Whangaruru in the tip of New Zealand's North Island. Its old name, Kou, roughly encompasses the area from Nuʻuanu Avenue to Alakea Street and from Hotel Street to Queen Street, which is the heart of the present downtown district.

== History ==
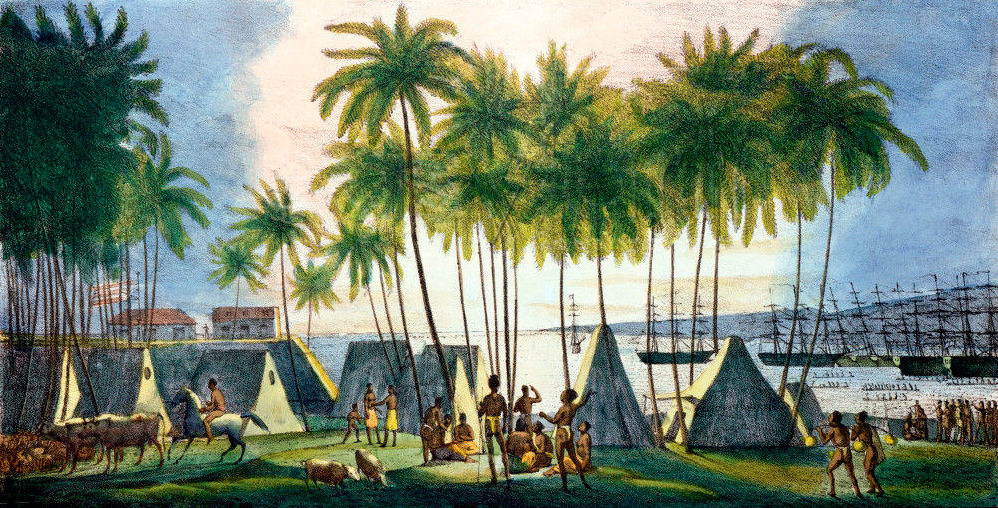
Port of Honolulu, as seen by German-Russian artist Louis Choris in 1816

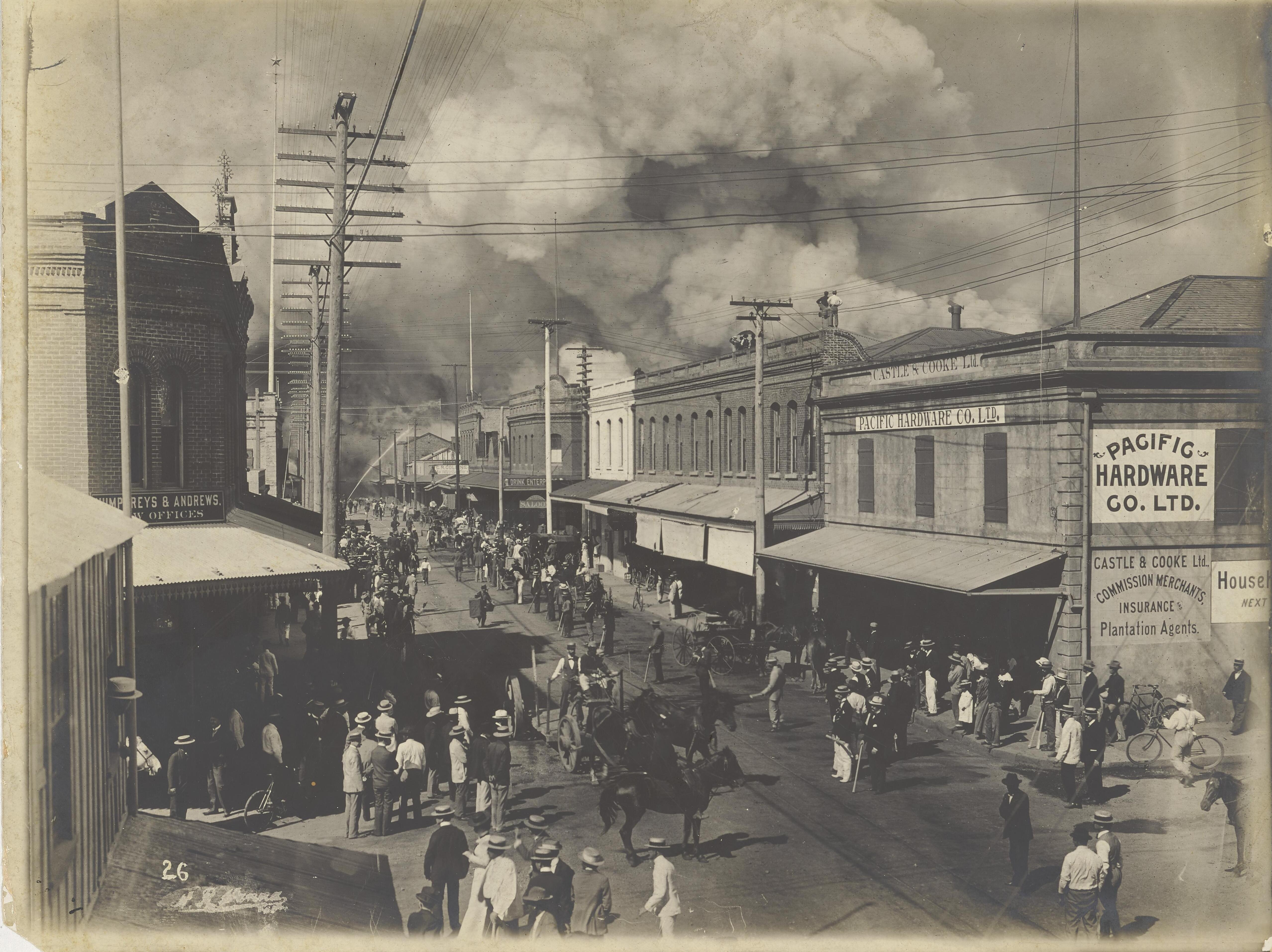
Great Chinatown Fire of 1900

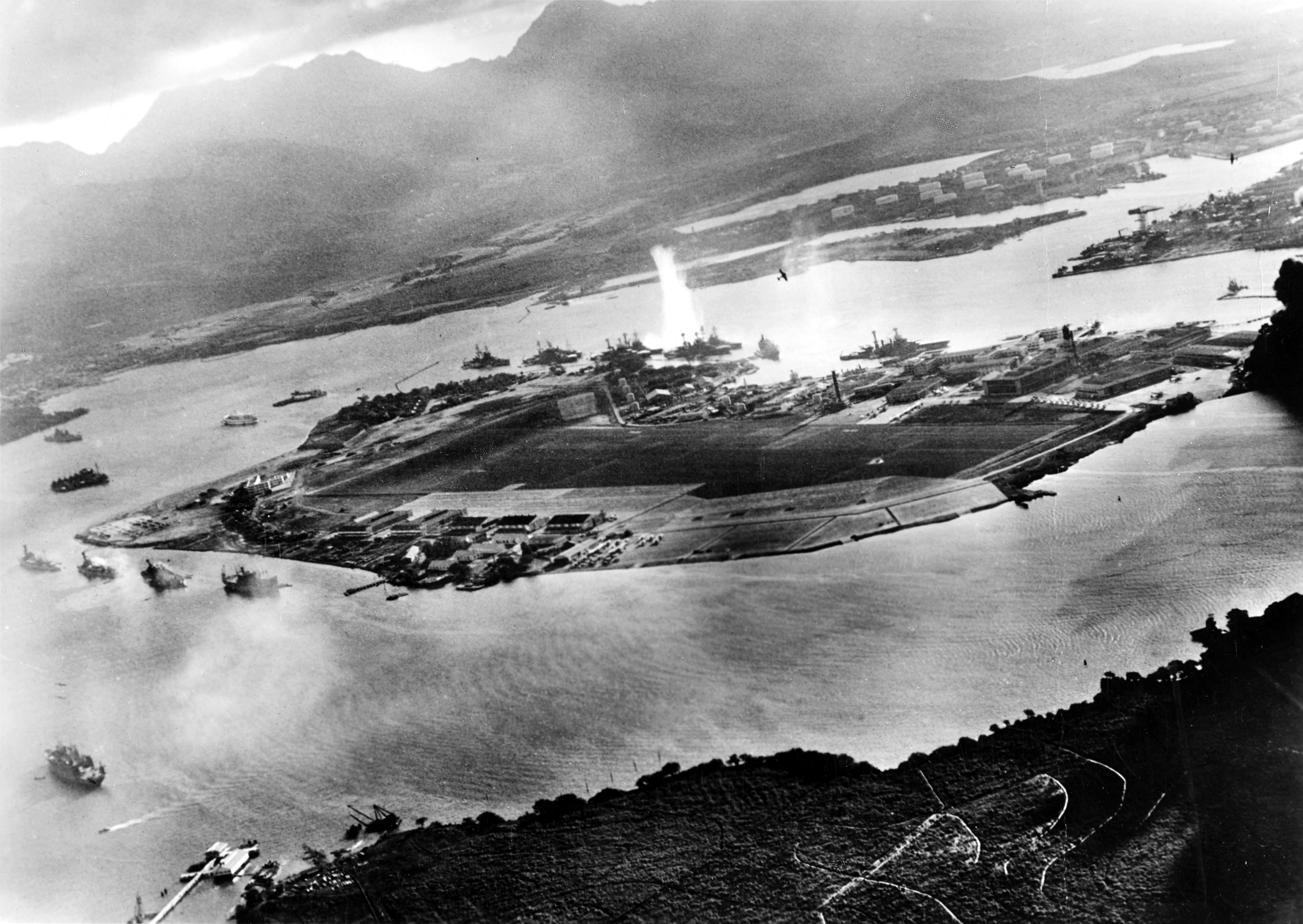
View of the attack on Pearl Harbor in 1941

Evidence of the first settlement of Honolulu by the original Polynesian migrants to the archipelago comes from oral histories and artifacts. These indicate that there was a settlement where Honolulu now stands in the 11th century. After Kamehameha I conquered Oʻahu in the Battle of Nuʻuanu at Nuʻuanu Pali, he moved his royal court from the Island of Hawaiʻi to Waikiki in 1804. His court relocated in 1809 to what is now downtown Honolulu. The capital was moved back to Kailua-Kona in 1812.

In November 1794, Captain William Brown of Great Britain was the first foreigner to sail into what is now Honolulu Harbor. More foreign ships followed, making the port of Honolulu a focal point for merchant ships traveling between North America and Asia. The settlement grew from a handful of homes to a city in the early 19th century after Kamehameha I chose it as a replacement for his residence at Waikiki in 1810.

In 1845, Kamehameha III moved the permanent capital of the Hawaiian Kingdom from Lahaina on Maui to Honolulu. He and the kings who followed him transformed Honolulu into a modern capital, erecting buildings such as St. Andrew's Cathedral, ʻIolani Palace, and Aliʻiōlani Hale. At the same time, Honolulu became the islands' center of commerce, with descendants of American missionaries establishing major businesses downtown.

Despite the turbulent history of the late 19th century and early 20th century—such as the overthrow of the Hawaiian monarchy in 1893, Hawaii's annexation by the U.S. in 1898, a large fire in 1900, and the Japanese attack on Pearl Harbor in 1941—Honolulu remained the Hawaiian Islands' capital, largest city, and main airport and seaport.

An economic and tourism boom following statehood brought rapid economic growth to Honolulu and Hawaii. Modern air travel brings, as of 2007, 7.6 million visitors annually to the islands, with 62.3% entering at Daniel K. Inouye International Airport. Today, Honolulu is a modern city with numerous high-rise buildings, and Waikiki is the center of the tourism industry in Hawaii, with thousands of hotel rooms.

== Geography ==
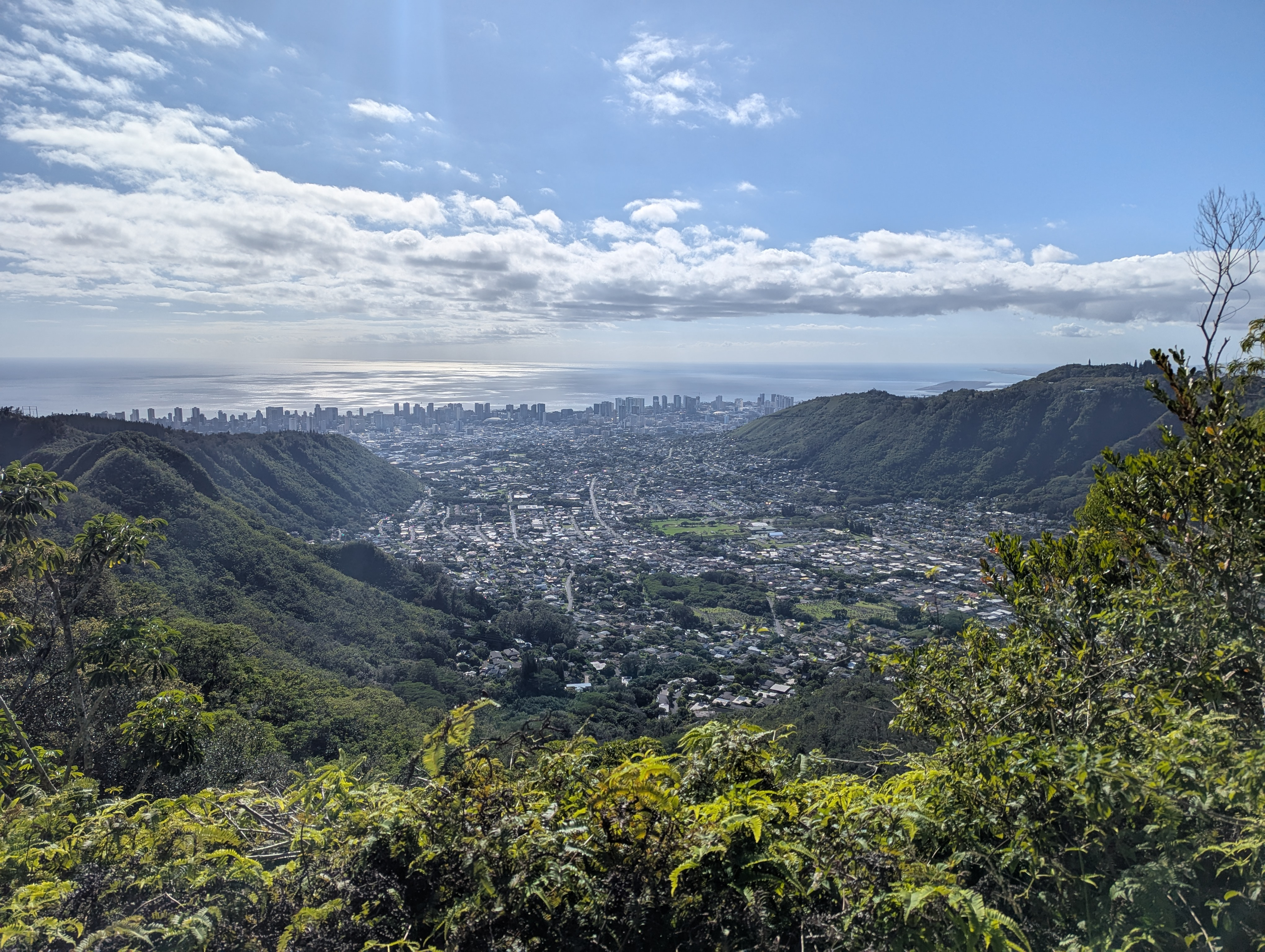
Mānoa Valley

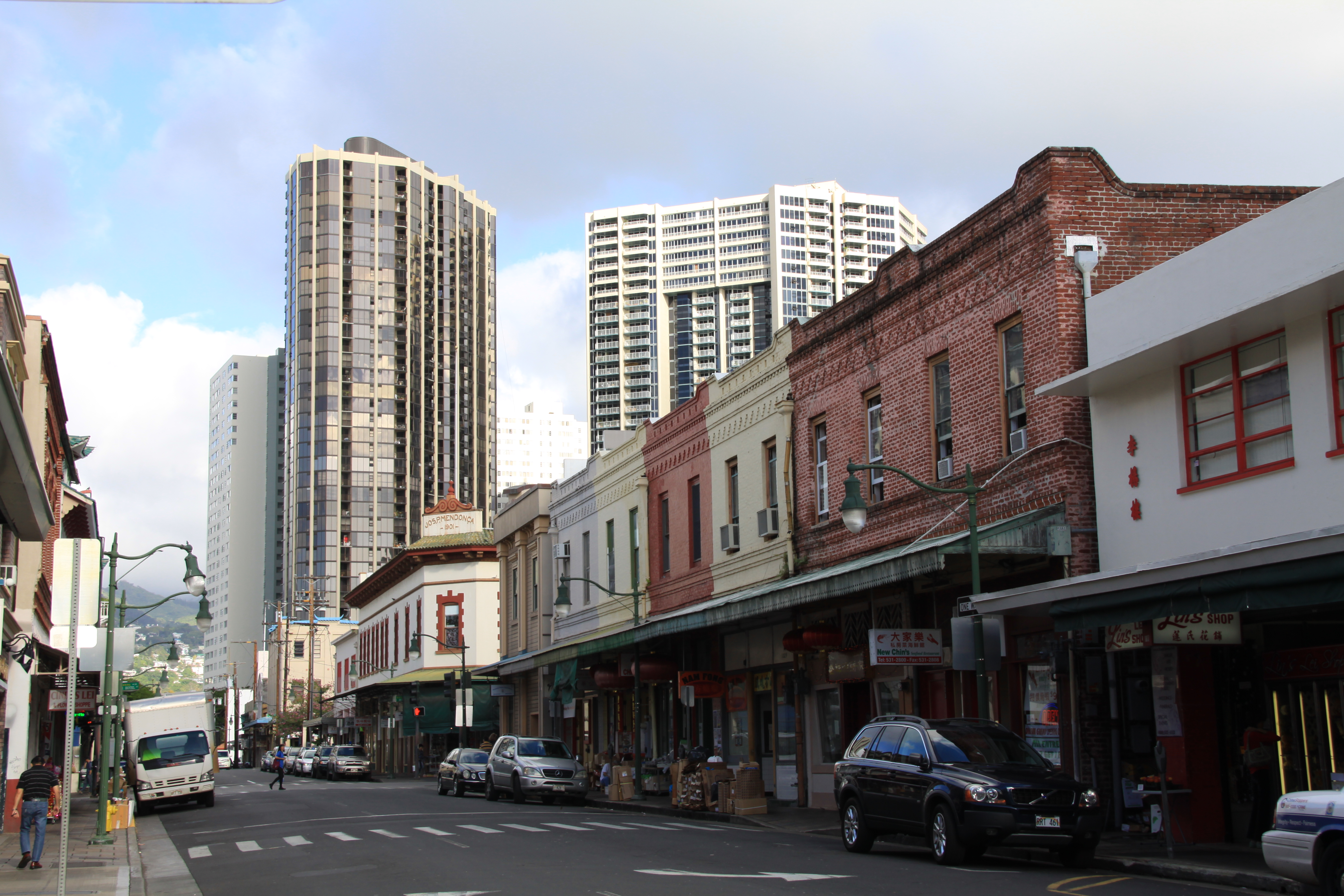
Chinatown

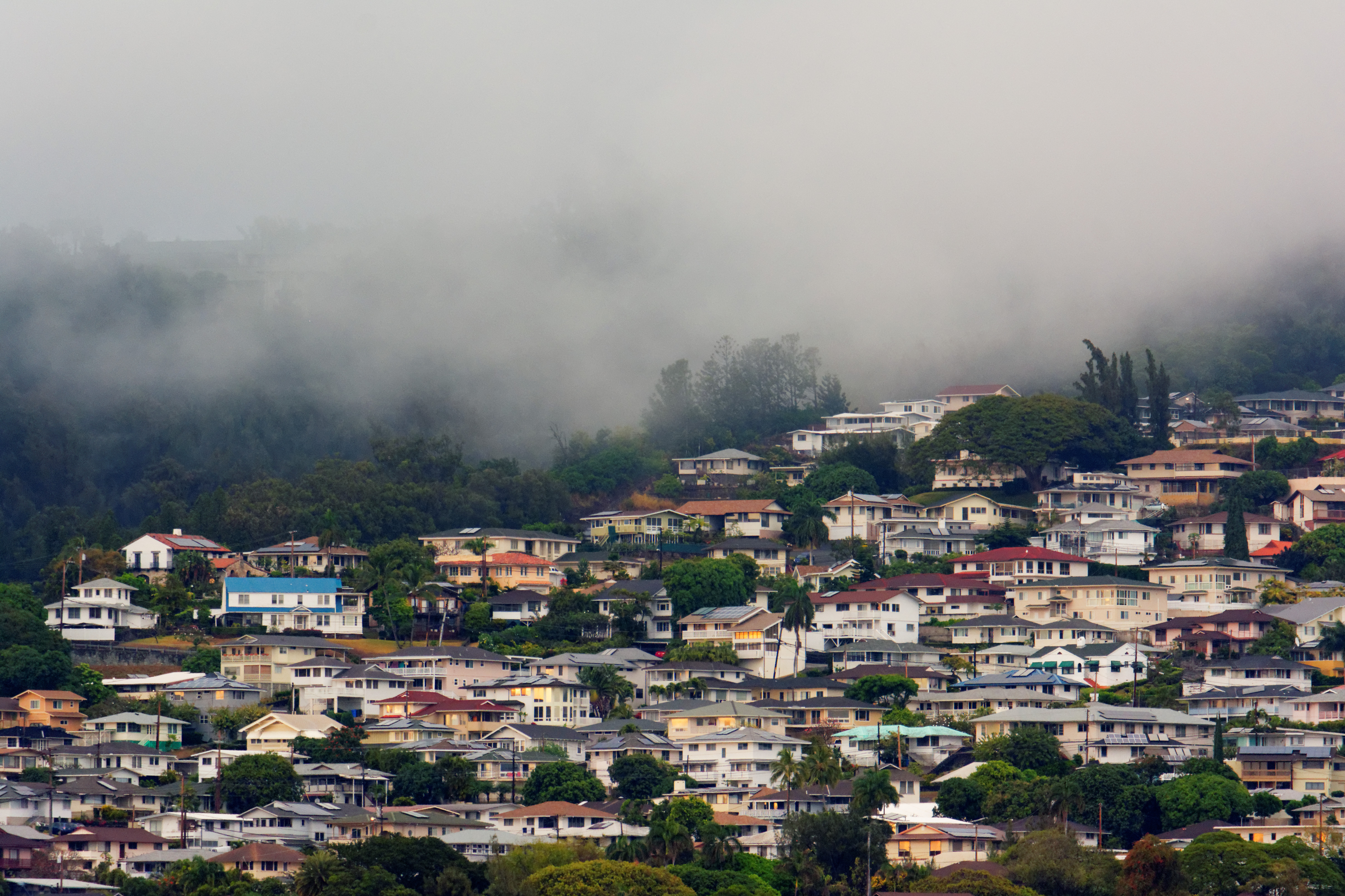
Alewa Heights

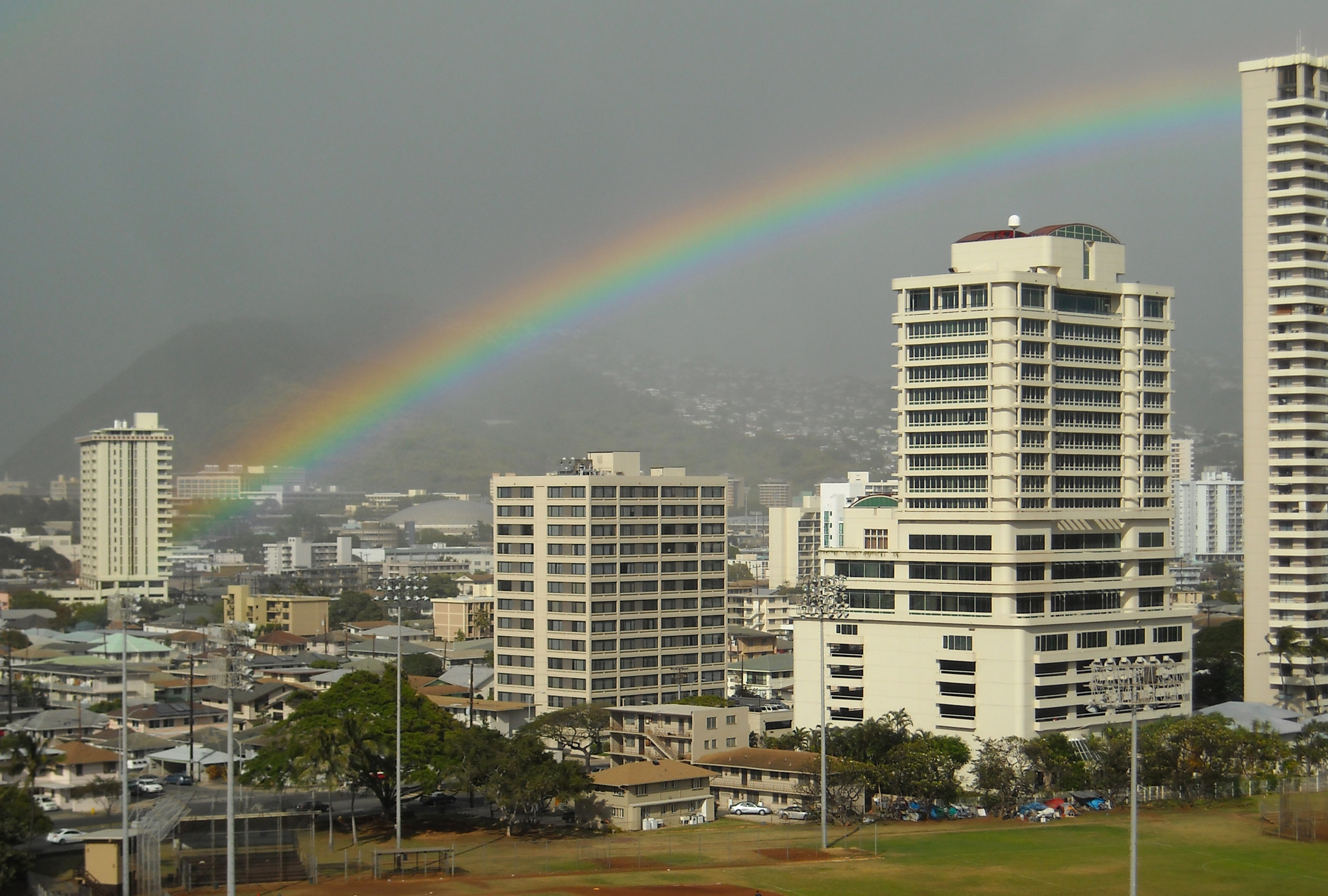
Mōʻiliʻili

According to the United States Census Bureau, the Urban Honolulu CDP has an area of 68.4 square miles (177.2 km^{2}), of which 7.9 square miles (20.5 km^{2}), or 11.56%, is water.

Honolulu is the most remote major U.S. city and one of the most isolated major cities in the world. The closest location in mainland U.S. is the Point Arena Lighthouse in northern California, at 2,045 nautical miles (2,353 mi; 3,787 km). (Nautical vessels require some additional distance to circumnavigate Makapuʻu Point.) The closest major city is San Francisco, California, at 2,083 nautical miles (2,397 mi; 3,858 km). Some islands off the Mexican coast and part of the Aleutian Islands of Alaska are slightly closer to Honolulu than the mainland.

The volcanic field of the Honolulu Volcanics is partially inside the city.

The antipode of Honolulu is in Botswana, Southern Africa.

=== Neighborhoods ===
- Downtown Honolulu is Hawaii's financial, commercial, and governmental center. On the waterfront is Aloha Tower, for many years Hawaii's tallest building. The tallest building is now the 438-foot (134 m) First Hawaiian Center, on King and Bishop Streets. The downtown campus of Hawaiʻi Pacific University is also there.
- The Arts District Honolulu, both downtown and in Chinatown, is on Chinatown's eastern edge. It is a 12-block area bounded by Bethel & Smith Streets and Nimitz Highway and Beretania Street—home to numerous arts and cultural institutions. It is within the Chinatown Historic District, which includes the former Hotel Street Vice District.
- The Capitol District is the eastern part of Downtown Honolulu. It is the current and historic center of Hawaii's state government, incorporating the State Capitol, ʻIolani Palace, Honolulu Hale (City Hall), State Library, and the statue of King Kamehameha I, along with numerous government buildings.
- Kakaʻako is a light-industrial district between Downtown and Waikiki that has seen a large-scale redevelopment effort in the past decade. It is home to two major shopping areas, Ward Warehouse and Ward Center. The Howard Hughes Corporation plans to transform Ward Centers into Ward Village over the next decade. The John A. Burns School of Medicine, part of the University of Hawaiʻi at Mānoa, is also there. A memorial to the Ehime Maru Incident victims is at the Kakaʻako Waterfront Park.
- Ala Moana is a district between Kakaʻako and Waikiki and the home of Ala Moana Center, the "world's largest open-air shopping center" and Hawaii's largest shopping mall. Ala Moana Center has over 300 tenants and is very popular with tourists. Also in Ala Moana is the Honolulu Design Center and Ala Moana Beach Park, Honolulu's second-largest park.
- Waikiki is Honolulu's tourist district, between the Ala Wai Canal and the Pacific Ocean next to Diamond Head. Numerous hotels, shops, and nightlife opportunities are along Kalākaua and Kūhiō Avenues. It is a popular location for visitors and locals alike and attracts millions of visitors every year. Most of Oʻahu's hotel rooms are in Waikiki.
- Mānoa, Mōʻiliʻili, and Makiki are residential neighborhoods in adjacent areas just inland of downtown and Waikiki. Mānoa Valley is home to the main campus of the University of Hawaiʻi.
- Nuʻuanu and Pauoa are upper-middle-class residential districts inland of downtown Honolulu. The National Memorial Cemetery of the Pacific is in Punchbowl Crater, fronting Pauoa Valley.
- Pālolo and Kaimukī are neighborhoods east of Mānoa and Makiki, inland from Diamond Head. Pālolo Valley parallels Mānoa and is a residential neighborhood. Kaimukī is primarily a residential neighborhood with a commercial strip centered on Waiʻalae Avenue running behind Diamond Head. Chaminade University is in Kaimukī.
- Waiʻalae and Kāhala are upper-class districts of Honolulu directly east of Diamond Head, with many high-priced homes. Also in these neighborhoods are the Waialae Country Club and the five-star Kahala Hotel & Resort.
- East Honolulu includes the residential communities of ʻĀina Haina, Niu Valley, and Hawaiʻi Kai. These are considered upper-middle-class neighborhoods. The upscale gated communities of Waiʻalae ʻIki and Hawaiʻi Loa Ridge are also there.
- Kalihi and Pālama are working-class neighborhoods with a number of government housing developments. Lower Kalihi, toward the ocean, is a light-industrial district.
- Salt Lake and Āliamanu are (mostly) residential areas built in extinct tuff cones along the western end of the Honolulu District, not far from Honolulu International Airport.
- Moanalua is two neighborhoods and a valley at the western end of Honolulu, and home to Tripler Army Medical Center.
- Kamehameha Heights is a northern suburb.

=== Climate ===
Honolulu experiences a hot semi-arid climate (Köppen classification BSh), with a mostly dry summer season, due to a rain shadow effect. Despite temperatures that meet the tropical threshold of all months having a mean temperature of 64.4 °F (18.0 °C) or higher, the city receives too little precipitation to be classified as tropical.

Temperatures vary little throughout the year, with average high temperatures of 80–90 °F (27–32 °C) and average lows of 65–75 °F (18–24 °C). Nevertheless, there are slight seasons. The "winter" months from December to March can occasionally see lows fall below 67 °F (19 °C), whereas the "summer" from June to September can get a limited number of hot days achieving 90 °F (32 °C) or higher. This occurs on an average of only 32 days annually, (Note: There have been as many as 116 days (in 1995) that reached 90 °F (32 °C), and as recently as, 2012, no days. The average is comparable to Philadelphia despite being slightly warmer during the summer.) with lows in the upper 50s °F (14–15 °C) once or twice a year. The highest recorded temperature was 95 °F (35 °C) on September 19, 1994, and August 31, 2019. The lowest recorded temperature was 52 °F (11 °C) on February 16, 1902, and January 20, 1969.

The annual average rainfall is 16.41 inches (417 millimeters), which mainly occurs from October through early April, with very little rainfall in the summer. However, both seasons experience a similar number of rainy days. Light showers occur in summer, while heavier rain falls during winter. Honolulu has an average of 278 sunny days and 89.2 rainy days per year.

Although the city is in the tropics, hurricanes are quite rare. The last recorded hurricane that hit near Honolulu was Category 4 Hurricane Iniki in 1992. Tornadoes are also uncommon and occur about every 15 years. Waterspouts off the coast are also uncommon, hitting about every five years.

Honolulu falls under the USDA 12b Plant Hardiness zone.

The average temperature of the sea ranges from 75.7 °F (24.3 °C) in March to 80.4 °F (26.9 °C) in September.

Climate data for Honolulu International Airport (1991−2020 normals, extremes 1877−present)
Month	Jan	Feb	Mar	Apr	May	Jun	Jul	Aug	Sep	Oct	Nov	Dec	Year
Record high °F (°C)	88 (31)	88 (31)	89 (32)	91 (33)	93 (34)	92 (33)	94 (34)	95 (35)	95 (35)	94 (34)	93 (34)	89 (32)	95 (35)
Mean maximum °F (°C)	84.0 (28.9)	84.6 (29.2)	85.0 (29.4)	86.4 (30.2)	88.5 (31.4)	89.1 (31.7)	90.4 (32.4)	91.1 (32.8)	91.2 (32.9)	90.1 (32.3)	87.3 (30.7)	85.1 (29.5)	91.7 (33.2)
Mean daily maximum °F (°C)	80.5 (26.9)	80.5 (26.9)	81.2 (27.3)	83.1 (28.4)	84.8 (29.3)	86.9 (30.5)	88.1 (31.2)	88.8 (31.6)	88.4 (31.3)	86.9 (30.5)	84.1 (28.9)	81.8 (27.7)	84.6 (29.2)
Daily mean °F (°C)	73.6 (23.1)	73.8 (23.2)	74.7 (23.7)	76.6 (24.8)	78.2 (25.7)	80.3 (26.8)	81.6 (27.6)	82.2 (27.9)	81.6 (27.6)	80.4 (26.9)	78.0 (25.6)	75.5 (24.2)	78.0 (25.6)
Mean daily minimum °F (°C)	66.8 (19.3)	67.1 (19.5)	68.1 (20.1)	70.1 (21.2)	71.5 (21.9)	73.8 (23.2)	75.1 (23.9)	75.6 (24.2)	74.8 (23.8)	73.9 (23.3)	71.8 (22.1)	69.2 (20.7)	71.5 (21.9)
Mean minimum °F (°C)	60.0 (15.6)	60.2 (15.7)	62.1 (16.7)	64.6 (18.1)	66.3 (19.1)	70.1 (21.2)	71.6 (22.0)	71.8 (22.1)	70.6 (21.4)	69.0 (20.6)	66.1 (18.9)	63.1 (17.3)	58.5 (14.7)
Record low °F (°C)	52.1 (11.2)	52.6 (11.4)	53.4 (11.9)	54.6 (12.6)	58.4 (14.7)	61.7 (16.5)	61.8 (16.6)	61.7 (16.5)	62.9 (17.2)	60.1 (15.6)	55.9 (13.3)	54.1 (12.3)	52.1 (11.2)
Average precipitation inches (mm)	1.84 (47)	1.94 (49)	2.36 (60)	0.77 (20)	0.82 (21)	0.50 (13)	0.52 (13)	0.84 (21)	0.88 (22)	1.51 (38)	2.25 (57)	2.18 (55)	16.41 (417)
Average precipitation days (≥ 0.01 in)	7.7	7.6	8.7	7.5	6.0	6.3	7.3	5.7	7.2	7.7	8.6	8.9	89.2
Average relative humidity (%)	73.3	70.8	68.8	67.3	66.1	64.4	64.6	64.1	65.5	67.5	70.4	72.4	67.9
Mean monthly sunshine hours	213.5	212.7	259.2	251.8	280.6	286.1	306.2	303.1	278.8	244.0	200.4	199.5	3,035.9
Percentage possible sunshine	63	66	69	66	69	71	74	76	76	68	60	59	68
Average ultraviolet index	6.8	8.5	10.2	11.2	11.6	11.8	12.2	12.2	11.1	8.9	6.8	6.0	9.7
Source 1: NOAA (relative humidity and sun 1961–1990)
Source 2: UV Index Today (1995 to 2022)

Climate data for Honolulu
Month	Jan	Feb	Mar	Apr	May	Jun	Jul	Aug	Sep	Oct	Nov	Dec	Year
Average sea temperature °F (°C)	76.5 (24.7)	75.9 (24.4)	75.7 (24.3)	76.9 (25.0)	77.9 (25.5)	78.7 (25.9)	78.9 (26.0)	79.5 (26.4)	80.4 (26.9)	79.8 (26.5)	78.5 (25.9)	77.0 (25.0)	78.0 (25.5)
Mean daily daylight hours	11.0	11.0	12.0	13.0	13.0	13.0	13.0	13.0	12.0	12.0	11.0	11.0	12.1
Average Ultraviolet index	7	9	11	11	11	11+	11+	11+	11	9	7	6	9.6
Source #1: seatemperature.org
Source #2: Weather Atlas

View source data.

== Demographics ==
Historical population
Census	Pop.	Note	%±
1890	22,907		—
1900	39,306		71.6%
1910	52,183		32.8%
1920	83,327		59.7%
1930	137,582		65.1%
1940	179,326		30.3%
1950	248,034		38.3%
1960	294,194		18.6%
1970	324,871		10.4%
1980	365,048		12.4%
1990	365,272		0.1%
2000	371,657		1.7%
2010	337,256		−9.3%
2020	350,964		4.1%
2025 (est.)	341,868	▼	−2.6%
Population 1890–2010.

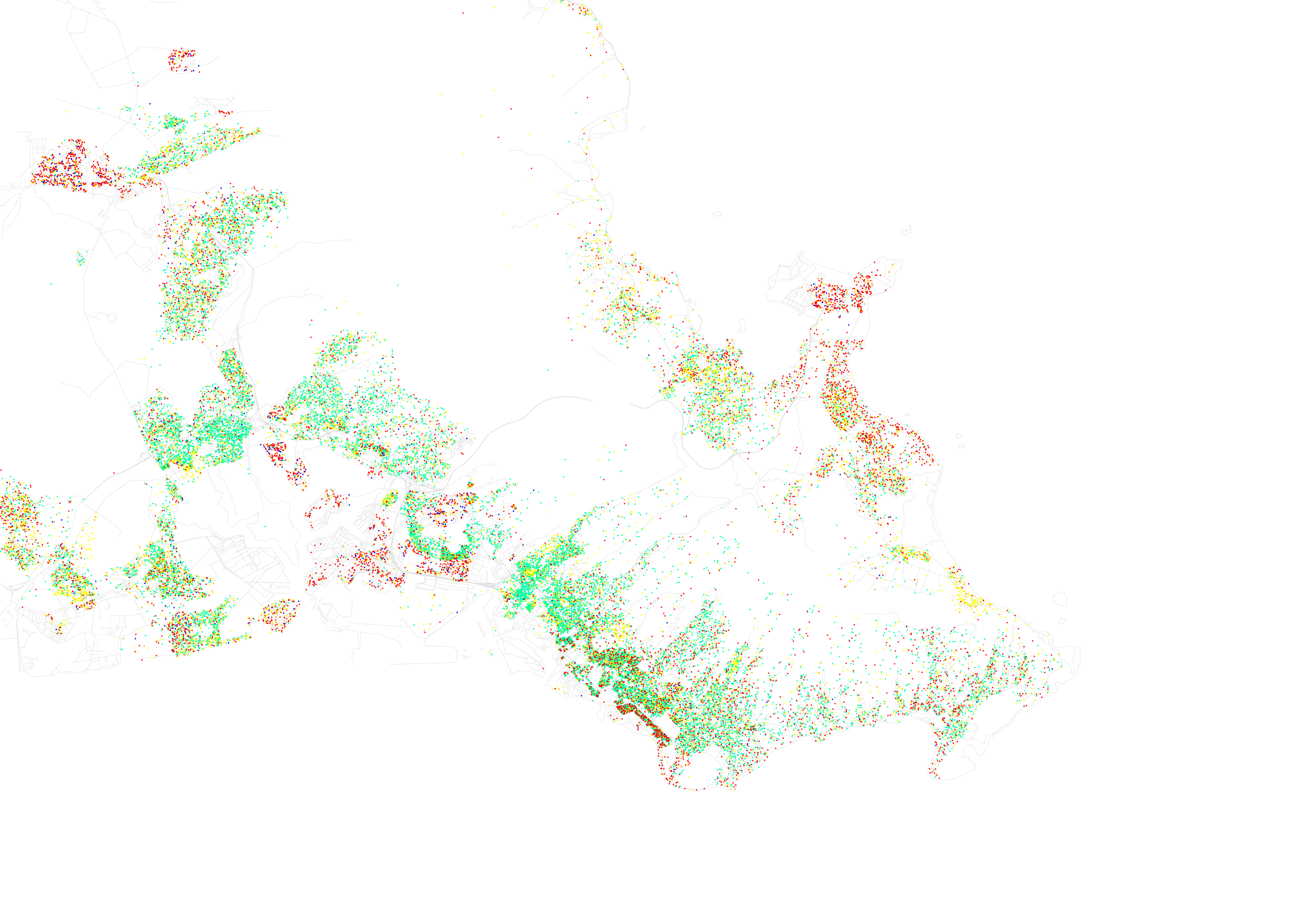
Map of racial distribution in Honolulu, 2010 U.S. Census. Each dot is 25 people: ⬤ European ⬤ African ⬤ Asian ⬤ Hispanic ⬤ Other

=== 2020 census ===
Honolulu, Hawaii – Racial and ethnic composition Note: the US census treats Hispanic/Latino as an ethnic category. This table excludes Latinos from the racial categories and assigns them to a separate category. Hispanics/Latinos may be of any race.
Race / Ethnicity (NH = Non-Hispanic)	Pop 2000	Pop 2010	Pop 2020	% 2000	% 2010	% 2020
White alone (NH)	69,503	55,762	54,137	18.70%	16.53%	15.43%
Black or African American alone (NH)	5,706	4,642	5,663	1.54%	1.38%	1.61%
Native American or Alaska Native alone (NH)	500	517	373	0.13%	0.15%	0.11%
Asian alone (NH)	205,563	182,792	183,712	55.31%	54.20%	52.34%
Pacific Islander or Native Hawaiian alone (NH)	24,739	27,346	31,459	6.66%	8.11%	8.96%
Other race alone (NH)	644	512	1,025	0.17%	0.15%	0.29%
Mixed race or Multiracial (NH)	48,773	47,384	52,613	13.12%	14.05%	14.99%
Hispanic or Latino (any race)	16,229	18,301	21,982	4.37%	5.43%	6.26%
Total	371,657	337,256	350,964	100.00%	100.00%	100.00%

The population of Honolulu is 350,964 as of the 2020 U.S. census, making it the 55th most populous city in the U.S. The city's population was 337,256 at the 2010 U.S. census.

The residential neighborhood of East Honolulu is considered a separate census-designated place by the Census Bureau but is generally considered part of Honolulu's urban core. The population of East Honolulu was 50,922 as of 2020, increasing Honolulu's core population to over 400,000.

In terms of race (including Hispanics in the racial counts), 54.8% were Asian, 17.9% were European, 1.5% were African American, 0.2% were Native American or Alaska Native, 8.4% were Native Hawaiian and Other Pacific Islander, 0.8% were from "some other race", and 16.3% were from two or more races. Separately, Hispanic and Latino residents of any race made up 5.4% of the population. In 1970, the Census Bureau reported Honolulu's population as 33.9% white and 53.7% Asian and Pacific Islander.

Asian Americans are the majority of Honolulu's population, accounting for over 52%. The Asian ethnic groups are Japanese (19.9%), Filipino (13.2%), Chinese (10.4%), Korean (4.3%), Vietnamese (2.0%), Indian (0.3%), Laotian (0.3%), Thai (0.2%), Cambodian (0.1%), and Indonesian (0.1%).

Pacific Islander Americans are 8.4% of Honolulu's population. The Pacific Islander ethnic groups are people solely of Native Hawaiian ancestry (3.2%), Samoan Americans made up 1.5% of the population, Marshallese people make up 0.5%, and Tongan people comprise 0.3%. People of Guamanian descent made up 0.2% of the population and numbered 841.

Metropolitan Honolulu, which encompasses all of Oahu island, had a population of 953,207 as of the 2010 U.S. census and 1,016,508 in the 2020 U.S. census, making it the 54th-largest metropolitan area in the United States.

== Economy ==
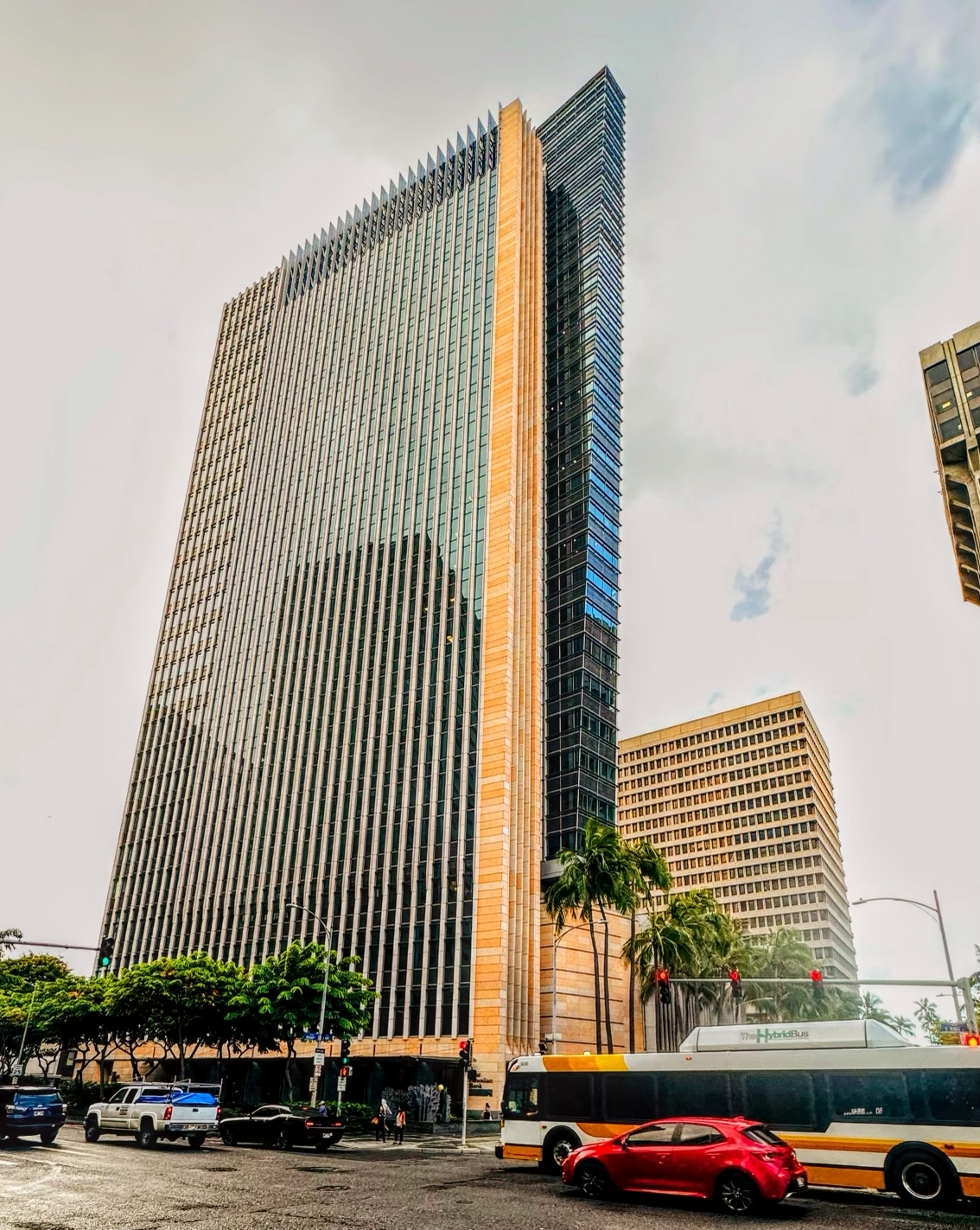
With symbolic native-styled architectural features, First Hawaiian Center is the tallest office building in Hawaii and home to a Honolulu Museum of Art Spalding House gallery.

The largest city and airport in the Hawaiian Islands, Honolulu acts as a natural gateway to the islands' large tourism industry, which brings millions of visitors and contributes $10 billion annually to the local economy. Honolulu's location in the Pacific also makes it a large business and trading hub, particularly between the East and the West. Other important aspects of the city's economy include military defense, research and development, and manufacturing.

Among the companies based in Honolulu are:

- Alexander & Baldwin
- American Savings Bank
- Bank of Hawaii
- Central Pacific Bank
- First Hawaiian Bank
- Hawaii Medical Service Association
- Hawaii Pacific Health
- Hawaiian Electric Industries
- Matson Navigation Company
- The Queen's Health Systems

Hawaiian Airlines, Island Air, and Aloha Air Cargo are headquartered in the city. Until it dissolved, Aloha Airlines was headquartered in the city. At one time Mid-Pacific Airlines had its headquarters on the property of Honolulu International Airport.

In 2009, Honolulu had a 4.5% increase in average rent, maintaining it in the second most expensive rental market among 210 U.S. metropolitan areas. Similarly, the general cost of living, including gasoline, electricity, and most foodstuffs, is much higher than on the U.S. mainland, because the city and state have to import most goods. One 2014 report found that cost of living expenses were 69% higher than the U.S. average. According to a 2024 report from the Department of Business, Economic Development & Tourism, Honolulu experienced a 1.5 percentage point higher CPI-U compared to the 3.2% U.S. average increase in the first half of 2024.

Banks based on the U.S. mainland have a minimal presence in Hawaii; residents typically use Hawaiian-based banks. First Hawaiian Bank is Hawaii's largest and oldest bank, headquartered at the First Hawaiian Center, the state's tallest office building.

== Arts and culture ==
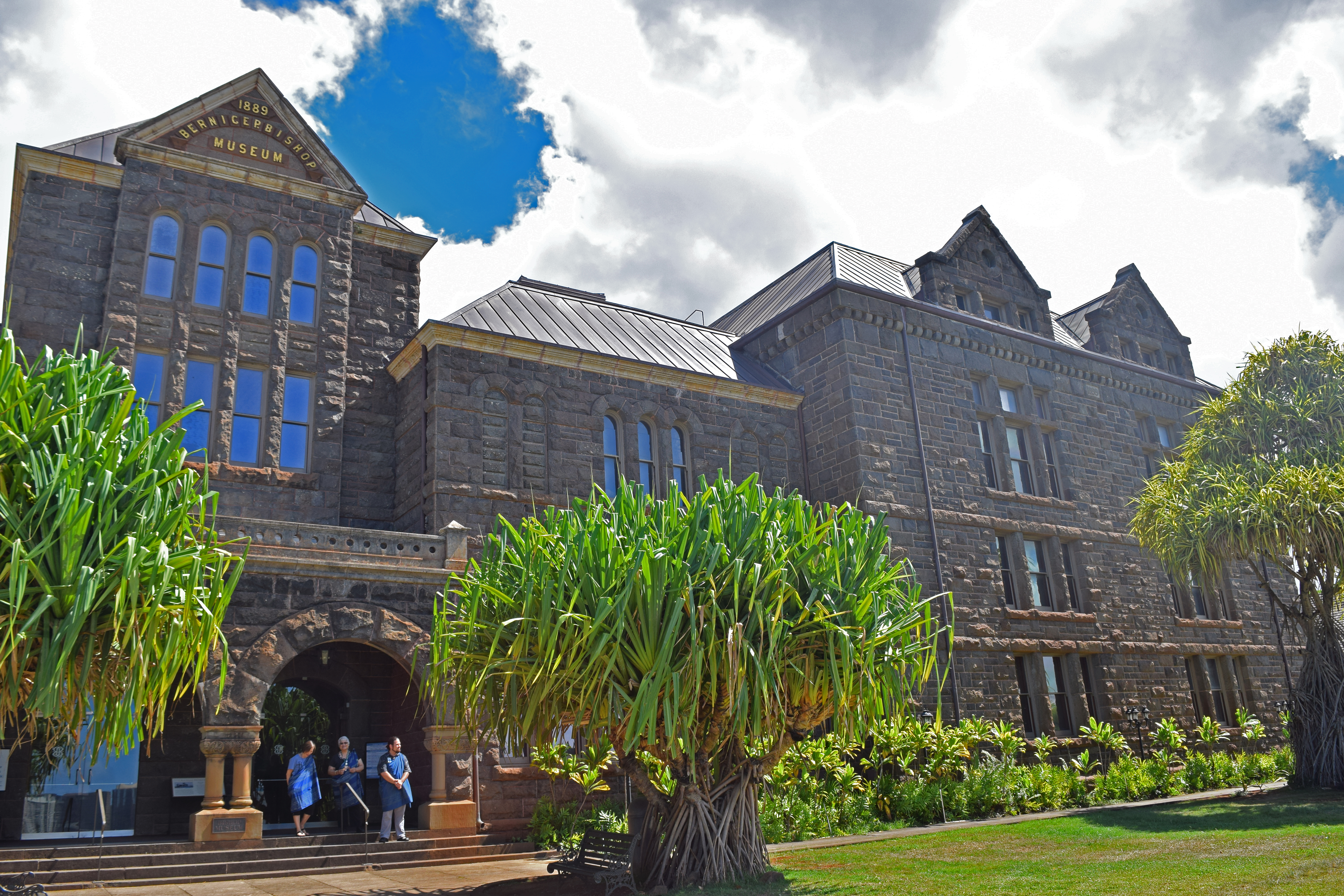
Bishop Museum

The Bishop Museum is Honolulu's largest museum. It has the state's largest collection of natural history specimens and the world's largest collection of Hawaiiana and Pacific culture artifacts. The Honolulu Zoo is Hawaii's main zoological institution, while the Waikiki Aquarium is a working marine biology laboratory. The Waikiki Aquarium partners with the University of Hawaiʻi and other universities worldwide. Established for appreciation and botany, Honolulu is home to several gardens: Foster Botanical Garden, Liliʻuokalani Botanical Garden, Walker Estate, among others.

Established in 1900, the Honolulu Symphony is the second-oldest U.S. symphony orchestra west of the Rocky Mountains. Other classical music ensembles include the Hawaii Opera Theatre. Honolulu is also a center for Hawaiian music. The main music venues include the Hawaii Theatre, the Neal Blaisdell Center Concert Hall and Arena, and the Waikiki Shell. Honolulu also includes several venues for live theater, including the Diamond Head Theatre and Kumu Kahua Theatre.

The Honolulu Museum of Art has Hawaii's largest collection of Asian and Western art. It also has the largest collection of Islamic art, housed at the Shangri La estate. Since the merger of the Honolulu Academy of Arts and The Contemporary Museum, Honolulu (now called the Honolulu Museum of Art Spalding House) in 2011, the museum is also the state's only contemporary art museum. The contemporary collections are housed at main campus (Spalding House) in Makiki and a multi-level gallery in downtown Honolulu at the First Hawaiian Center. The museum hosts a film and video program dedicated to arthouse and world cinema in the museum's Doris Duke Theatre, named for the museum's historic patroness Doris Duke.

The Hawaii State Art Museum (also downtown) has pieces by local artists as well as traditional Hawaiian art. The museum is administered by the Hawaii State Foundation on Culture and the Arts.

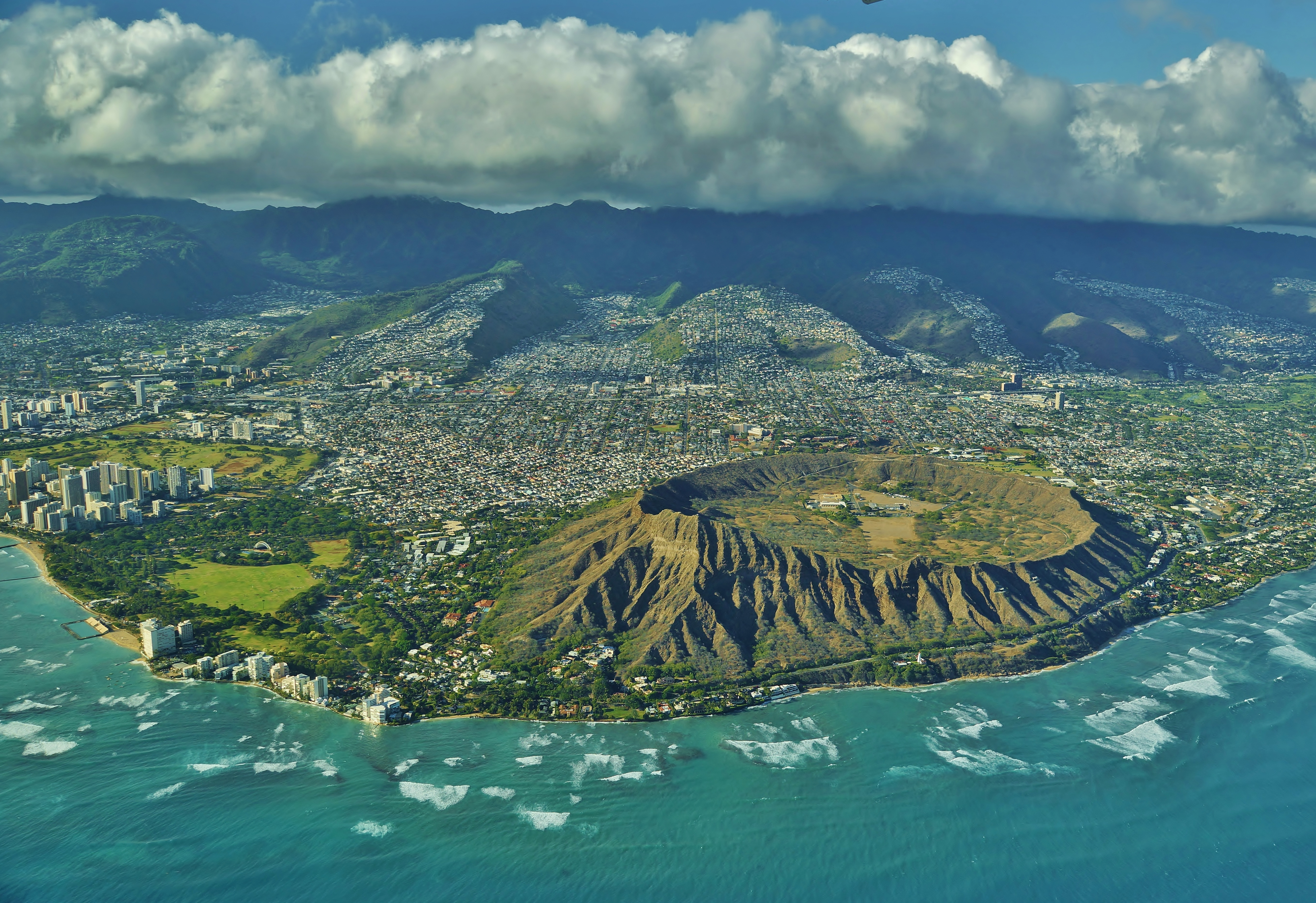
Aerial view of Diamond Head

Honolulu also annually holds the Hawaii International Film Festival (HIFF). It showcases some of the best films from producers all across the Pacific Rim and is the largest "East meets West" style film festival of its sort in the United States.

=== Tourist attractions ===
- Ala Moana Center
- Aloha Tower
- Bishop Museum
- Diamond Head
- Hanauma Bay
- Honolulu Museum of Art
- Honolulu Zoo
- ʻIolani Palace
- Lyon Arboretum
- National Memorial Cemetery of the Pacific
- USS Arizona Memorial
- Waikiki Aquarium
- Waikiki Beach
- Waikiki Trolley
- International Market Place
- Kapiʻolani Park

== Sports ==
Honolulu's tropical climate lends itself to year-round activities. Honolulu has three large road races: the Great Aloha Run, Honolulu Marathon, and Honolulu Triathlon. Ironman Hawaii was first held in Honolulu. It was the first ever Ironman triathlon event and is also the world championship. The Waikiki Roughwater Swim race is held annually off the beach of Waikiki on a 2.384 miles (3.837 km) course.

Fans of spectator sports in Honolulu generally support the football, volleyball, basketball, rugby union, rugby league, and baseball programs of the University of Hawaiʻi at Mānoa. High school sporting events, especially football, are especially popular. Honolulu has no professional sports teams, with any prospective teams being forced to conduct extremely long travels for away games in the continental states. It was the home of the Hawaii Islanders (Pacific Coast League, 1961–87), The Hawaiians (World Football League, 1974–75), Team Hawaii (North American Soccer League, 1977), and the Hawaiian Islanders (af2, 2002–04).

The NCAA football Hawaii Bowl is played in Honolulu. Honolulu also hosted the NFL's annual Pro Bowl every year from 1980 to 2016, with exception of the 2010 and 2015 editions, which were played in Miami Gardens and Glendale, respectively. From 1993 to 2008, Honolulu hosted Hawaii Winter Baseball, featuring minor-league players from Major League Baseball, Nippon Professional Baseball, Korea Baseball Organization, and independent leagues.

Honolulu Little League baseball teams have been successful in the Little League World Series, winning the championship in 2018 and 2022. In 2024, Honolulu was the official home of the Pokémon World Championships.

=== Venues ===
Venues for spectator sports in Honolulu include:

- Les Murakami Stadium at University of Hawaiʻi at Mānoa (baseball)
- Neal S. Blaisdell Center Arena (basketball)
- Stan Sheriff Center at University of Hawaiʻi at Mānoa (basketball and volleyball)

Aloha Stadium was a venue for American football and soccer located in Halawa near Pearl Harbor, just outside Honolulu. The stadium was closed in 2020. Plans for a new stadium at the site were announced in 2022.

== Government ==
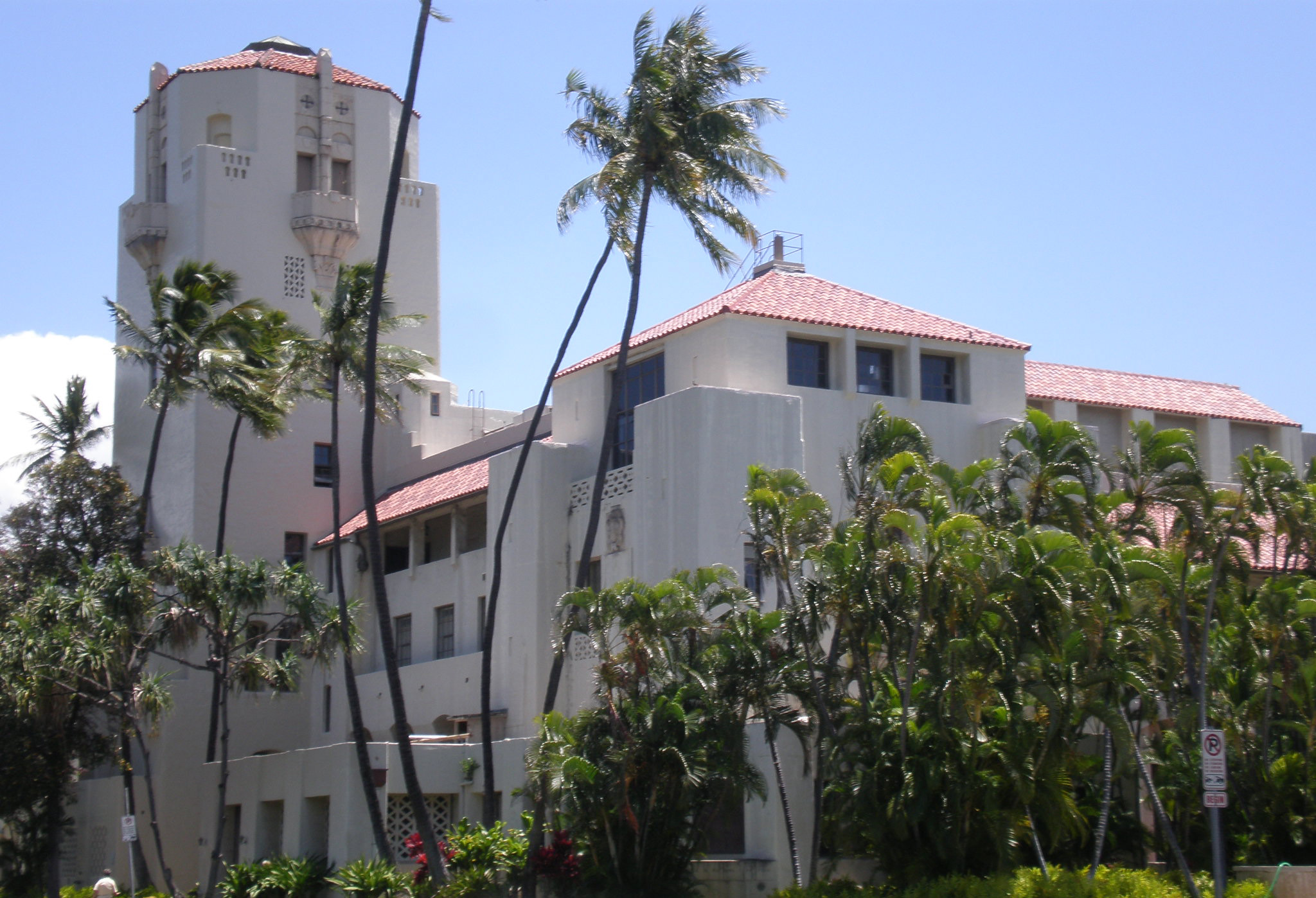
Completed in 1928, Honolulu Hale is the city and county seat.

Rick Blangiardi was elected mayor of Honolulu County on August 8, 2020, and began serving as the county's 15th mayor on January 2, 2021. The municipal offices of the City and County of Honolulu, including Honolulu Hale, the seat of the city and county, are in the Capitol District, as are the Hawaii state government buildings.

The Capitol District is in the Honolulu census county division (CCD), the urban area commonly regarded as the "City" of Honolulu. The Honolulu CCD is on the southeast coast of Oʻahu between Makapuu and Halawa. The division boundary follows the Koʻolau crestline, so Makapuʻu Beach is in the Ko'olaupoko District. On the west, the division boundary follows Halawa Stream, then crosses Red Hill and runs just west of Aliamanu Crater, so that Aloha Stadium, Pearl Harbor (with the USS Arizona Memorial), and Hickam Air Force Base are all in the island's Ewa CCD.

The Hawaii Department of Public Safety operates the Oʻahu Community Correctional Center, the jail for the island of Oʻahu, in Honolulu CCD.

The United States Postal Service operates post offices in Honolulu. The main Honolulu Post Office is by the international airport, at 3600 Aolele Street. Federal Detention Center, Honolulu, operated by the Federal Bureau of Prisons, is in the CDP.

=== Foreign missions on the island ===
Several countries have consular facilities in Honolulu. They include consulates of Japan, South Korea, the Philippines, Taiwan, Federated States of Micronesia, Australia, New Zealand and the Marshall Islands.

== Education and research ==
=== Colleges and universities ===
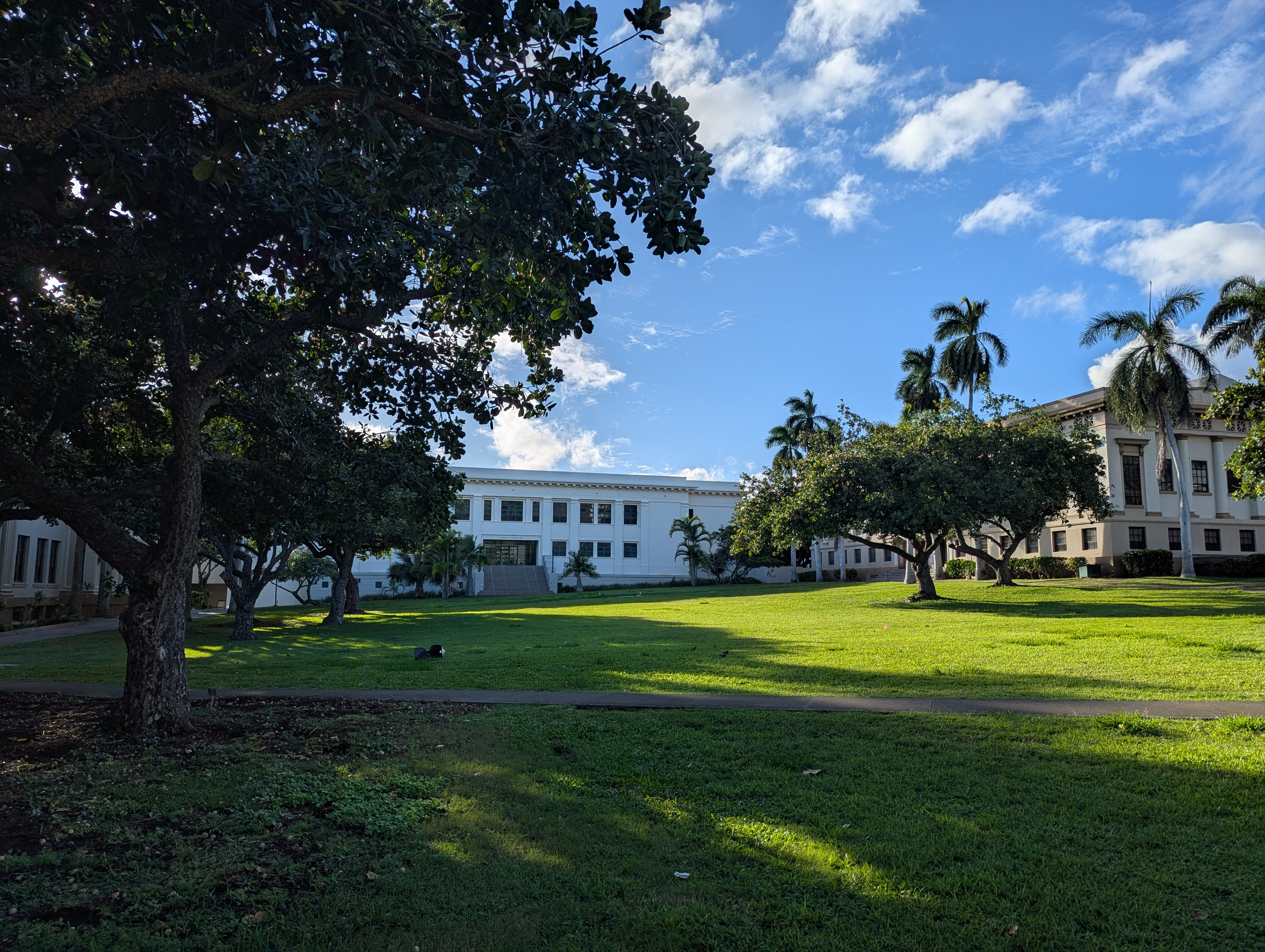
University of Hawaiʻi at Mānoa campus

Colleges and universities in Honolulu include Honolulu Community College, Kapiʻolani Community College, the University of Hawaiʻi at Mānoa, Chaminade University, and Hawaii Pacific University. University of Hawaiʻi at Mānoa houses the main offices of the University of Hawaiʻi System.

=== Research institutions ===
Honolulu is home to three international affairs research institutions. The Pacific Forum, one of the world's leading Asia-Pacific policy research institutes and one of the first U.S. organizations to focus exclusively on Asia, has its main office on Bishop Street in downtown Honolulu. The East–West Center (EWC), an education and research organization established by Congress in 1960 to strengthen relations and understanding among the peoples and nations of Asia, the Pacific, and the U.S., is headquartered in Mānoa, Honolulu. The Asia-Pacific Center for Security Studies (APCSS), a U.S. Department of Defense institute, is based in Waikiki. APCSS addresses regional and global security issues and supports the U.S. Pacific Command by developing and sustaining relationships among security practitioners and national security establishments throughout the region.

=== Primary and secondary schools ===
Hawaii State Department of Education operates Honolulu's public schools. Public high schools in the CDP area include Wallace Rider Farrington, Kaiser, Kaimuki, Kalani, Moanalua, William McKinley, Theodore Roosevelt, and Hawaii School for the Deaf and the Blind, the statewide school for blind and deaf children. There is also a charter school, University Laboratory School.

As of 2014 almost 38% of K-12 students in the Honolulu area attend private schools. Among them are Academy of the Pacific, Damien Memorial School, Hawaii Baptist Academy, ʻIolani School, Lutheran High School of Hawaii, Kamehameha Schools, Maryknoll School, Mid-Pacific Institute, La Pietra, Punahou School, Sacred Hearts Academy, St. Andrew's Priory School, Saint Francis School, Saint Louis School, the Education Laboratory School, Saint Patrick School, Trinity Christian School, and Varsity International School. Hawaii has one of the nation's highest rate of private school attendance.

=== Weekend educational programs ===
The Hawaiʻi Japanese School – Rainbow Gakuen (ハワイレインボー学園 Hawai Reinbō Gakuen), a supplementary weekend Japanese school, holds its classes in Kaimuki Middle School in Honolulu and has its offices in another building in Honolulu. The school serves overseas Japanese nationals. Honolulu has other weekend programs for the Japanese, Chinese, and Spanish languages.

=== Libraries ===
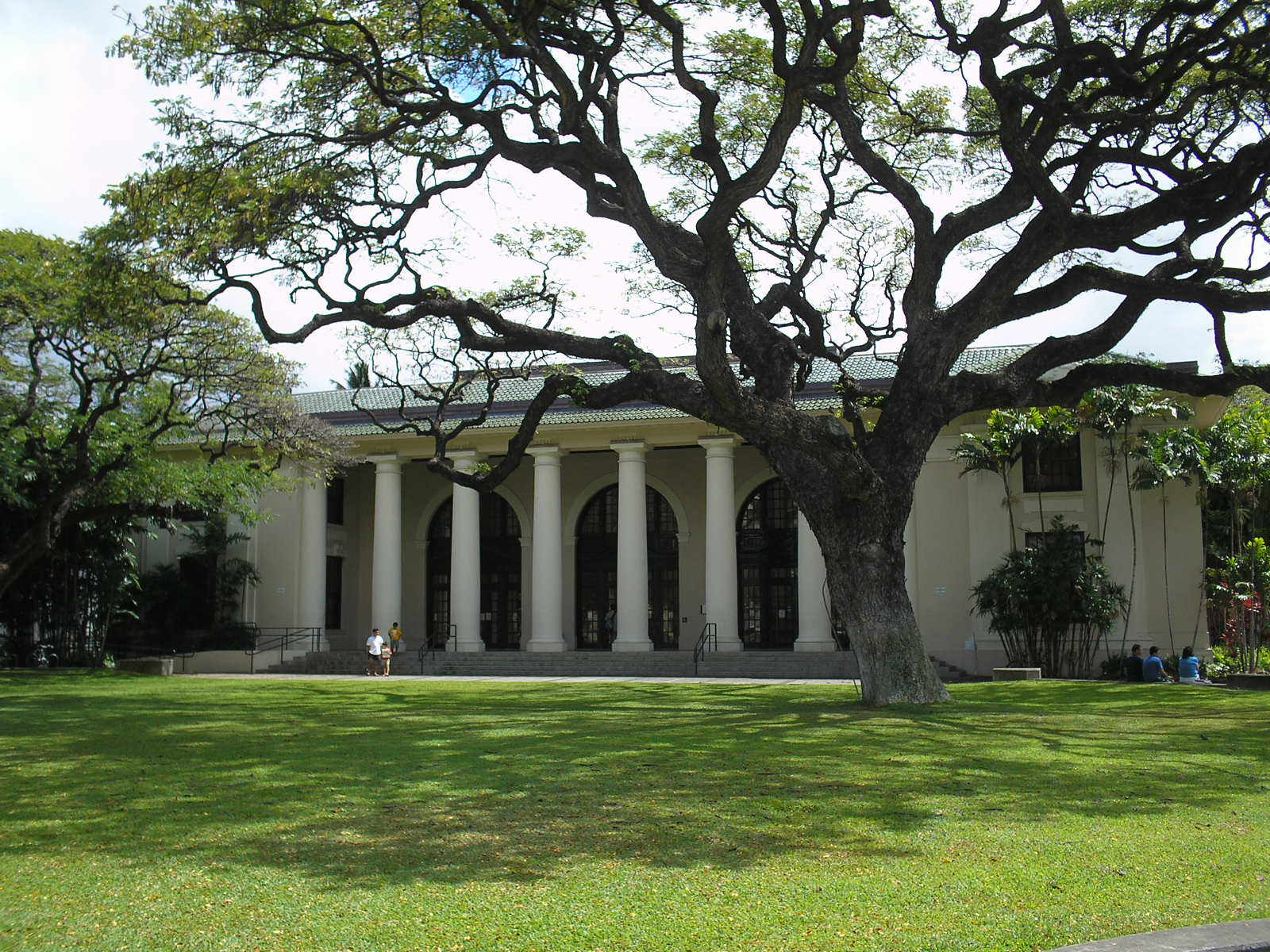
Hawaii State Library

Hawaii State Public Library System operates public libraries. The Hawaii State Library in the CDP serves as the system's main library, while the Library for the Blind and Physically Handicapped, also in the CDP area, serves handicapped and blind people.

Branches in the CDP area include Aiea, Aina Haina, Ewa Beach, Hawaiʻi Kai, Kahuku, Kailua, Kaimuki, Kalihi-Palama, Kaneohe, Kapolei, Liliha, Mānoa, McCully-Moiliili, Mililani, Moanalua, Wahiawa, Waialua, Waianae, Waikiki-Kapahulu, Waimanalo, and Waipahu.

== Media ==
Honolulu is served by one daily newspaper, the Honolulu Star-Advertiser, along with a magazine, Honolulu Magazine, and several radio stations and television stations, among other media. Local news agency and CNN-affiliate Hawaii News Now broadcasts and is headquartered out of Honolulu.

== Transportation ==
=== Air ===
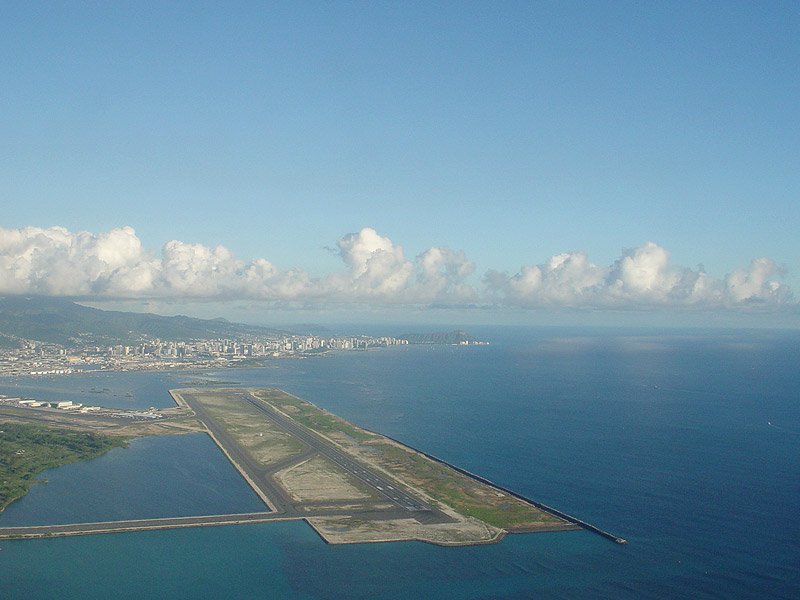
8R "Reef Runway" of Daniel K. Inouye International Airport

At the western end of the CDP, Daniel K. Inouye International Airport (HNL) is the principal aviation gateway to the state of Hawaii. Kalaeloa Airport is primarily a commuter facility used by unscheduled air taxis, general aviation and transient and locally based military aircraft.

=== Highways ===
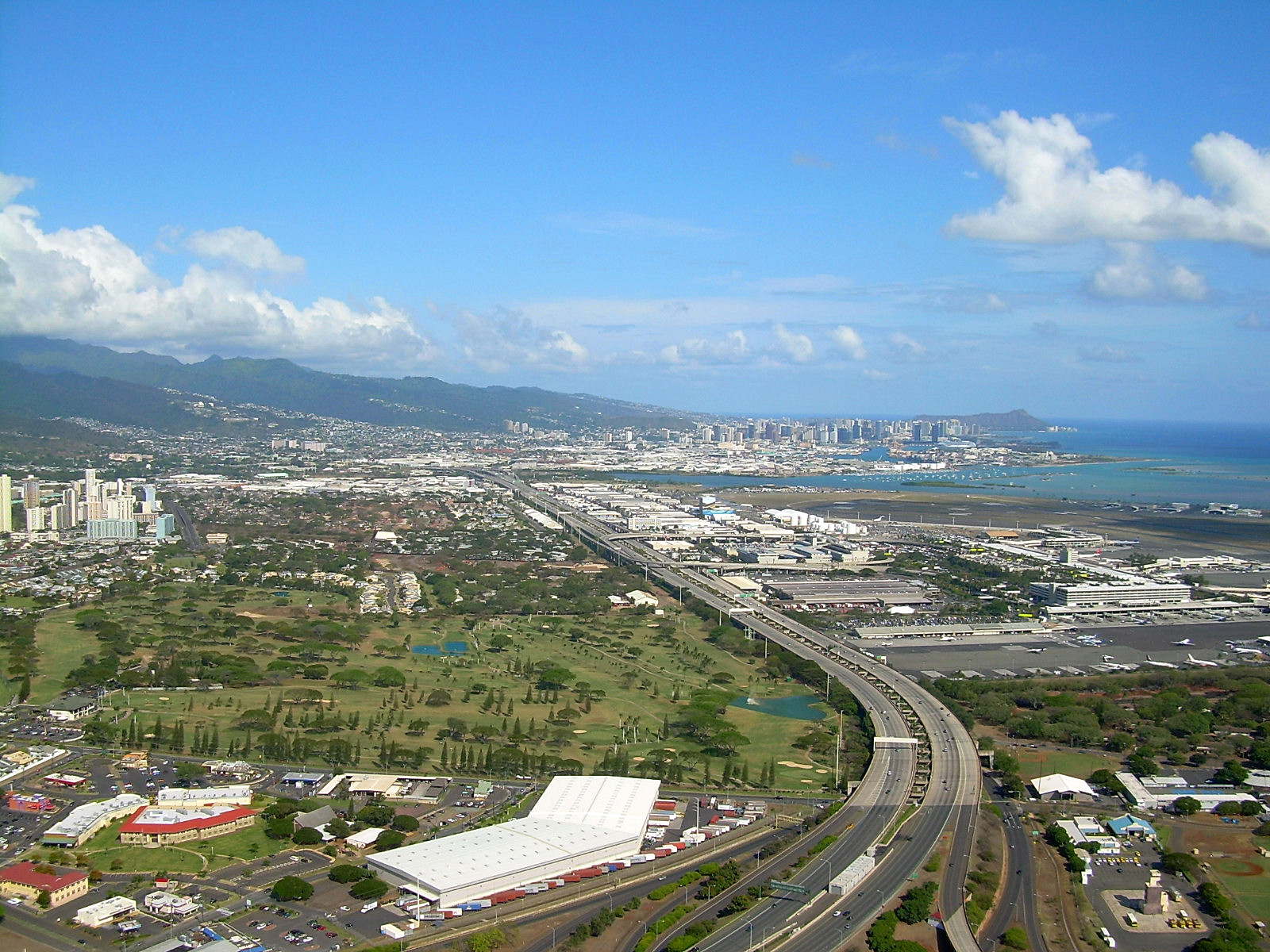
Aerial view of H-1 (looking east) from Daniel K. Inouye International Airport heading into downtown Honolulu

Honolulu has been ranked as having the nation's worst traffic congestion, beating former record holder Los Angeles. Drivers spend on average over 58 hours per year on congested roadways. The following freeways, part of the Interstate Highway System serve Honolulu:

- Interstate H-1. Its western terminus is at Kapolei, where the roadway continues onto Farrington Highway. The H-1 passes Hickam Air Force Base and Daniel K. Inouye International Airport, and runs through Pearl City before reaching downtown Honolulu. After continuing eastward through Makiki and Kaimuki, it ends at Waialae/Kahala as the roadway continues onto Kalanianole Highway.
- Interstate H-201—known as the Moanalua Freeway and sometimes referred to by its former number, Hawaii State Route 78—connects two points along H-1: Aloha Stadium and Fort Shafter. Close to H-1 and Aloha Stadium, H-201 has an exchange with the western terminus of Interstate H-3 to the windward side of Oʻahu (Kaneohe). This complex of connecting ramps, some directly between H-1 and H-3, is in Halawa.
- Interstate H-2 connects with the H-1 freeway at a junction near Waipahu and Pearl City. It passes Schofield Barracks before ending at Wahiawa, where it connects to the North Shore.
- Interstate H-3 connects to H-1 at a junction near Hālawa, runs from Hālawa through the Ko'olau Range via the Tetsuo Harano Tunnels to Kaneohe, and ends at Marine Corps Base Hawaii.

Other major highways that link Honolulu CCD with other parts of the Island of Oʻahu are:

- Pali Highway, (State Route 61), which crosses north over the Koʻolau range via the Pali Tunnels to connect to Kailua and Kaneohe on the windward side of the Island.
- Likelike Highway, (State Route 63), which also crosses the Koʻolau mountains to Kaneohe via the Wilson Tunnels.
- Kalanianaole Highway, State Route 72, which runs eastward from Waialae/Kahala to Hawaiʻi Kai and around Oʻahu's east end to Waimanalo Beach.
- Kamehameha Highway, State Routes 80, 83, 99 and 830, which runs westward from near Hickam Air Force Base to Aiea and through the center of the island and the North Shore, ending in Kaneohe.
- Farrington Highway, State Route 93, which runs along western leeward Oʻahu from Kaena Point through Waianae and Makaha before the start of the H-1. State Route 930 starts east-to-west in the north shore from Wailua to Kaena Point.

Like most major American cities, the Honolulu metropolitan has heavily congested traffic during rush hours, especially to and from the western suburbs of Kapolei, ʻEwa Beach, Aiea, Pearl City, Waipahu, and Mililani.

There is a Hawaii Electric Vehicle Demonstration Project (HEVDP).

=== Public transit ===
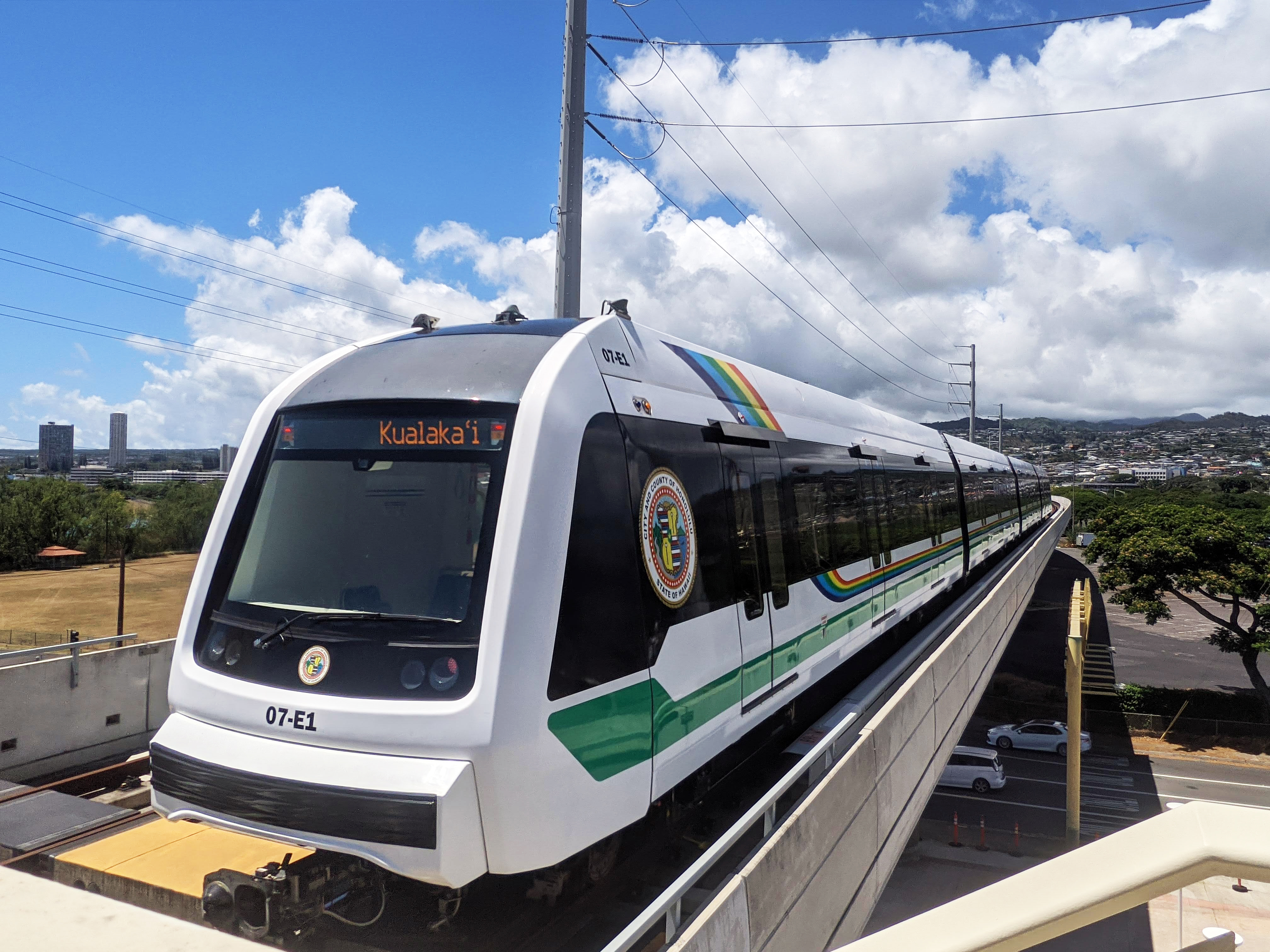
A Skyline train departing Hālawa station

Honolulu is constructing a 20-mile (32 km) rail transit line that will connect Honolulu with cities and suburban areas near Pearl Harbor and in the Leeward and West Oʻahu regions. Approved in 2010 by public referendum, Skyline aims to alleviate traffic congestion for West Oʻahu commuters while aiding the westward expansion of the metropolitan area. The project has been criticized for its high cost, delays, and potential environmental impacts, but the line is expected to have large ridership. The line's first segment connects East Kapolei and Aloha Stadium and opened on June 30, 2023. The opening of the first phase of Skyline was delayed until 2023, as HART canceled the initial bids for the first nine stations, rebid the work as three packages of three stations each, and allowed more time for construction in the hope that increased competition on smaller contracts would drive down costs; initial bids ranged from $294.5 million to $320.8 million, far surpassing HART's $184 million budget.

Electric street railways were operated in Honolulu by the now-defunct Honolulu Rapid Transit Company before World War II. Predecessors to the Honolulu Rapid Transit Company were the Honolulu Rapid Transit and Land Company (began 1903) and Hawaiian Tramways (began 1888).

Established by former Mayor Frank F. Fasi as the replacement for the Honolulu Rapid Transit Company (HRT), Honolulu's TheBus system was honored in 1994–95 and 2000–01 by the American Public Transportation Association as "America's Best Transit System". TheBus operates 107 routes serving Honolulu and most major cities and towns on Oʻahu. TheBus comprises a fleet of 531 buses, and is run by the nonprofit corporation Oʻahu Transit Services in conjunction with the city Department of Transportation Services. As of 2006, Honolulu was ranked fourth for highest per-capita use of mass transit in the United States.

The island also features TheHandi-Van, for riders who require para-transit operations. To be eligible for this service, riders must meet the requirements of the Americans with Disabilities Act (ADA). TheHandi-Van has a fare of $2 and is available from 4am to 1am. There is a 24-hour service within 3/4 of a mile of TheBus route 2 and route 40. TheHandi-Van comprises a fleet of 160 buses. The parantransit branch also runs Human Services Transportation Coordination (HSTCP), which mainly provides transportation for people with disabilities, older adults, and people with limited incomes, assisted by the Committee for Accessible Transportation (CAT). Both organizations work together to provide transportation for elderly and persons with disabilities.

=== Bicycle sharing ===
Since June 28, 2017, Bikeshare Hawaii administers the bicycle sharing program in Oʻahu while Secure Bike Share operates the Biki system. Most Biki stations are between Chinatown/Downtown and Diamond Head, but a 2018 expansion added stations toward the University of Hawaiʻi at Mānoa Campus, Kapiʻolani Community College, Makiki, and Kalihi area.

=== Modal characteristics ===
According to the 2016 American Community Survey (five-year average), 56% of Urban Honolulu residents commuted to work by driving alone, 13.8% carpooled, 11.7% used public transportation, and 8.7% walked. About 5.7% commuted by bike, taxi, motorcycle or other forms of transportation, while 4.1% worked at home.

The city of Honolulu has a high percentage of households without a motor vehicle. In 2015, 16.6% of Honolulu households were car-free, which increased slightly to 17.2% in 2016; by comparison, the United States national average was 8.7% in 2016. Honolulu averaged 1.4 cars per household in 2016, compared to a national average of 1.8.

== Public safety ==
The Honolulu Police Department is the primary law enforcement agency for the city and county of Honolulu and serves all of Oʻahu. The department has a mixed fleet of marked and unmarked patrol cars along with a subsidized vehicle program. Marked vehicles are white with blue stripes and white lettering reading HONOLULU POLICE. The Honolulu Police Department lets officers of a certain rank purchase a private vehicle for police use. Subsidized vehicles are unmarked but have a blue roof light. Subsidized vehicles can be any make, model, or color, but must follow department rules and guidelines. Honolulu Police and Hawaii County Police on the Big Island are the only departments in the state or the nation with subsidized vehicles. All Hawaii Police keep their cruise blue lights on while on patrol.

The Honolulu Fire Department provides firefighting services and first responder level emergency medical services on Oʻahu. Emergency medical services at higher levels are provided by the Honolulu Emergency Medical Services. Fire trucks in Honolulu are yellow.

== Sister cities ==
Honolulu's sister cities are:

- Avarua, Cook Islands, 2024
- Baguio, Philippines, 1991
- Baku, Azerbaijan 1998
- Bangkok, Thailand, 2025
- Bruyères, France, 1960
- Cali, Colombia, 2012
- Candon, Philippines, 2015
- Caracas, Venezuela, 1990
- Cebu City, Philippines, 1990
- Chengdu, China, 2011
- Chigasaki, Japan, 2014
- Edogawa (Tokyo), Japan, 2022
- Fengxian (Shanghai), China, 2012
- Funchal, Portugal, 1979
- Fuzhou, China, 2021
- Haikou, China, 1985
- Havana, Cuba, 2002
- Hegyvidék, Hungary, 2025
- Hiroshima, Japan, 1959
- Huế, Vietnam, 1995
- Incheon, South Korea, 2003
- Kaohsiung, Taiwan, 1962
- Kyzyl, Russia, 2004
- Laoag, Philippines, 1969
- Majuro, Marshall Islands, 2001
- Mandaluyong, Philippines, 2005
- Manila, Philippines, 1980
- Mombasa, Kenya, 2000
- Mumbai, India, 1970
- Nagaoka, Japan, 2012
- Naha, Japan, 1960
- Noreña, Spain, 1960
- Qinhuangdao, China, 2010
- Rabat, Morocco, 2007
- Saiki, Japan, 2003
- San Juan, Puerto Rico, 1985
- Seoul, South Korea, 1976
- Shibuya, Japan, 2024
- Shonai, Japan, 2025
- Sintra, Portugal, 1998
- Uwajima, Japan, 2004
- Vigan, Philippines, 2003
- Zhangzhou, China, 2012
- Zhongshan, China, 1997

== See also ==
- List of tallest buildings in Honolulu
- USS Honolulu, 3 ships
