= Varsity International School =

Private school in Hawaii, United States

Coordinates: 21.291680°N 157.821445°W

- Honolulu, Hawaii

Information
- School type: Private School
- Gender: Mixed
- Enrollment: c.60

Varsity International School is an independent, private co-educational high school in Honolulu, Hawaii. The school is nonsectarian.

== Enrollment ==
Approximately 60 students are enrolled at the school, the majority of whom are of Asian ancestry.
