= ʻĀlewa Heights =

Neighborhood of Hawaii, United States

Coordinates: 21°20.381′N 157°51.012′W

‘Ālewa Heights
- Neighborhood of Honolulu
- Country: United States
- State: Hawaii
- City: Honolulu

Population (2020)
  - Total: 2,305

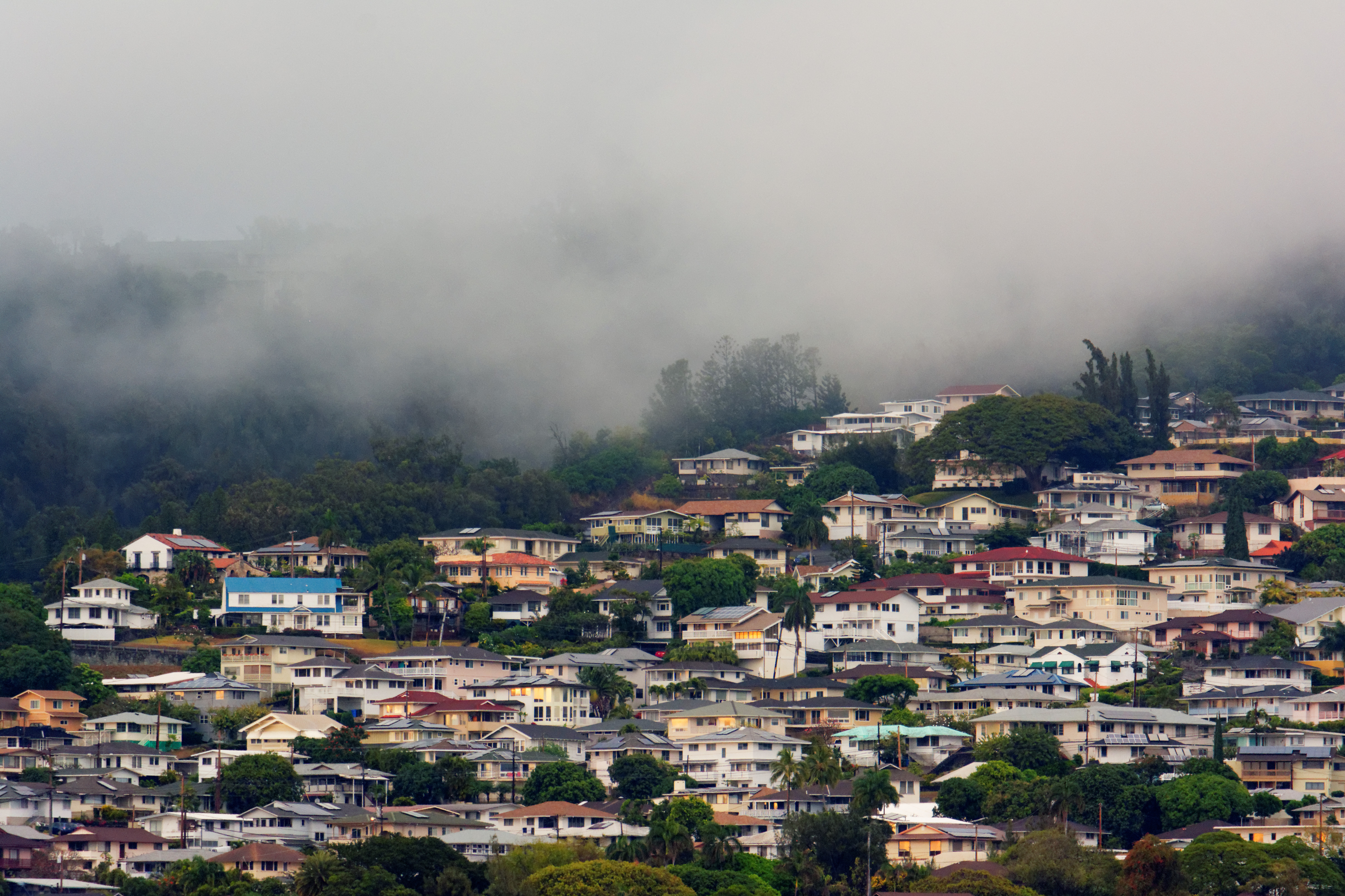

ʻĀlewa Heights is a neighborhood of Honolulu, Hawaii. It is located on Kapālama Ridge, above Nuʻuanu Valley. "ʻĀlewa" means "to float." ʻĀlewa Drive is the main road in the neighborhood. Near the top of the heights, ʻĀlewa Drive is one of the steepest streets in Honolulu. ʻĀlewa Heights is the home of Natsunoya Tea House, a historic local banqueting hall. Assets School is also located on lower ʻĀlewa Heights. ʻĀlewa Neighborhood Park and Na Pueo Park are the two parks that serve the area. Hale Kakoʻo, a respite center for people with Alzheimer's disease, is adjacent to Na Pueo Park.
