= Waikiki Trolley =

Waikiki Trolley is an Oahu-based transportation company that shuttles Hawaii visitors and local passengers throughout Waikiki, Honolulu and East Oahu on multiple lines. The company began operations on April 19, 1986, with two buses. Today the company maintains a fleet of more than 50 trolleys, the majority being reproductions of classic San Francisco cable cars with authentic brass and wood trimmings. The fleet also includes double-decker buses used exclusively for the Red and Blue lines.

Multi-day trolley passes allow unlimited boarding privileges on all four lines for either four days or seven days. Single-day passes also allow unlimited boarding on all four lines.

== Lines ==
The Waikiki Trolley operates several routes:

- Red Line, which stops along multiple historically and culturally significant sites in Honolulu, including the Honolulu Museum of Art, ʻIolani Palace, Punchbowl, and Chinatown.
- Green Line, the hiking and local food tour which stops inside Diamond Head, including stops in Kaimuki and other foodie hotspots.
- Blue Line, a scenic tour along the coastline east of Diamond Head, stopping at Hanauma Bay, Halona Blowhole, Sandy Beach, and Sea Life Park.
- Pink Line, which runs to several popular shopping sites, including Ala Moana Center, DFS Galleria, International Market Place, Royal Hawaiian Center, Waikiki Beach Walk, and Hilton Hawaiian Village.
