= HHSAA State Football Championships =

Annual games played to crown the Hawaiian state football champions

- Sport: Football
- State: Hawaii
- Level of competition: High School
- Founded: 1999 (Division I); 2003 (Division II); 2016 (Open Division)
- Divisions: 3 (Open, I, & II)

Open
- Current champions: Kapolei
- Most Championships: Saint Louis (5)

Division I
- Current champions: Kailua
- Most Championships: Kahuku (8)

Division II
- Current champions: KS-Maui
- Most Championships: 'Iolani (8)

The Hawaii High School Athletic Association (HHSAA) State Football Championship consists of the two games that are played annually to crown the Division 1 and Division 2 state football champions in Hawaii. Before 1999, when the State Football Championship game was instituted, Hawaii did not crown an official state champion in football and instead held the Oahu Prep Bowl, which matched up the champions of the two football leagues on Oahu to play.

As of 2016, the Hawaii High School Athletic Association board approved for a three-tier football state championship format, which will go into effect. The number of teams in the Divisional tournaments will vary each year.

== History of the Oahu Prep Bowl ==
In the early years of prep football the question of "who's the best high school football team in the state" could never be answered as Hawaii never conducted a state championship. This all changed in 1973 when Bill Smithe of the Oahu Interscholastic Association (OIA) and Clay Benham of the Interscholastic League of Honolulu (ILH) struck a deal where the champions from each league met to decide who was the best team in the state. The game was initially called the Oahu Bowl, marking the first time that league champions played each other in the postseason. Though the bowl game did not include neighbor island champions, it was considered Hawaii's state championship. In 1974, the name was changed from Oahu Bowl to the Oahu Prep Bowl and the game became an annual tradition.

=== Past Oahu Prep Bowl Championship Results ===
Year	Winner	Score	Opponent
1973	Waianae (OIA)	6-0	St. Louis (ILH)
1974	KS-Kapālama (ILH)	27-26	Leilehua (OIA)
1975	KS-Kapālama (ILH)	20-14	Waianae (OIA)
1976	KS-Kapālama (ILH)	46-6	Radford (OIA)
1977	Waianae (OIA)	27-6	Punahou (ILH)
1978	Waianae (OIA)	14-6	KS-Kapālama (ILH)
1979	Kaiser (OIA)	27-7	KS-Kapālama (ILH)
1980	Iolani (ILH)	7-7 (tie)	Waianae (OIA)
1981	Radford (OIA)	14-2	St. Louis (ILH)
1982	Pac-Five (ILH)	14-7	Waianae (OIA)
1983	St. Louis (ILH)	15-12	Nanakuli (OIA)
1984	Leilehua (OIA)	10-0	St. Louis (ILH)
1985	Pac-Five (ILH)	56-7	Waianae (OIA)
1986	St. Louis (ILH)	49-6	Waianae (OIA)
1987	St. Louis (ILH)	35-0	Waianae (OIA)
1988	St. Louis (ILH)	49-7	Waianae (OIA)
1989	St. Louis (ILH)	35-18	Kahuku (OIA)
1990	St. Louis (ILH)	38-3	Farrington (OIA)
1991	St. Louis (ILH)	36-6	Waianae (OIA)
1992	St. Louis (ILH)	35-7	Waianae (OIA)
1993	St. Louis (ILH)	37-22	Kahuku (OIA)
1994	St. Louis (ILH)	26-20	Kahuku (OIA)
1995	St. Louis (ILH)	27-26	Kahuku (OIA)
1996	St. Louis (ILH)	7-0	Waianae (OIA)
1997	St. Louis (ILH)	27-0	Waianae (OIA)
1998	St. Louis (ILH)	28-20	Kahuku (OIA)

Prep Bowl Past Champions Record (Championships/Runners-Up)

- St. Louis (14-3)
- Waianae (4-10)
- KS-Kapālama (3-2)
- Pac-Five (2-0)
- Iolani (1-0)
- Kaiser (1-0)
- Leilehua (1-1)
- Radford (1-1)
- Nanakuli (0-1)
- Punahou (0-1)
- Farrington (0-1)
- Kahuku (0-5)

== Past HHSAA State Football Championship Results ==
=== Open Division ===
Year	Winner	Score	Opponent
2016	St. Louis (ILH)	30-14	Kahuku (OIA)
2017	St. Louis (ILH)	31-28	Kahuku (OIA)
2018	St. Louis (ILH)	38-17	Mililani (OIA)
2019	St. Louis (ILH)	45-6	Kahuku (OIA)
2021	Kahuku (OIA)	49-14	St. Louis (ILH)
2022	Kahuku (OIA)	20-0	Punahou (ILH)
2023	Kahuku (OIA)	21-19	Mililani (OIA)
2024	St. Louis (ILH)	17-10	Kahuku (OIA)
2025	Campbell (OIA)	26-23	KS-Kapālama (ILH)
2026	Kapolei (OIA)	30-8	KS-Kapālama (ILH)

=== Division I ===
Year	Winner	Score	Opponent
1999	St. Louis (ILH)	19-0	Kahuku (OIA)
2000	Kahuku (OIA)	26-20	St. Louis (ILH)
2001	Kahuku (OIA)	21-14	St. Louis (ILH)
2002	St. Louis (ILH)	34-15	Castle (OIA)
2003	Kahuku (OIA)	27-26	St. Louis (ILH)
2004	KS-Kapālama (ILH)	28-7	Leilehua (OIA)
2005	Kahuku (OIA)	28-21	Punahou (ILH)
2006	Kahuku (OIA)	7-6	St. Louis (ILH)
2007	Leilehua (OIA)	20-16	St. Louis (ILH)
2008	Punahou (ILH)	38-7	Leilehua (OIA)
2009	KS-Kapālama (ILH)	34-21	Kahuku (OIA)
2010	St. Louis (ILH)	36-13	Waianae (OIA)
2011	Kahuku (OIA)	30-24	Punahou (ILH)
2012	Kahuku (OIA)	42-20	Punahou (ILH)
2013	Punahou (ILH)	28-22	Mililani (OIA)
2014	Mililani (OIA)	53-45	Punahou (ILH)
2015	Kahuku (OIA)	39-14	St. Louis (ILH)
2016	Mililani (OIA)	31-20	Iolani (ILH)
2017	Hilo (BIIF)	35-19	Damien (ILH)
2018	Waipahu (OIA)	42-22	Hilo (BIIF)
2019	Hilo (BIIF)	20-17	'Iolani (ILH)
2021	'Iolani (ILH)	38-0	Lahainaluna (MIL)
2022	Konawaena (BIIF)	38-28	Waipahu (OIA)
2023	Waipahu (OIA)	53-28	Konawaena (BIIF)
2024	Kapa'a (KIF)	10-7	Konawaena (BIIF)
2025	Kailua (OIA)	13-9	Kapa'a (KIF)

=== Open Division Championship Game wins and appearances by school ===
Appearances	School	W	L	Pct	Games
7	Kahuku	3	4	.428	Lost 2016 Title Game; Lost 2017 Title Game; Lost 2019 Title Game; Won 2021 Title Game; Won 2022 Title Game; Won 2023 Title Game; Lost 2024 Title Game
6	St. Louis	5	1	.833	Won 2016 Title Game; Won 2017 Title Game; Won 2018 Title Game; Won 2019 Title Game; Lost 2021 Title Game; Won 2024 Title Game
2	Mililani	0	2	.000	Lost 2018 Title Game; Lost 2023 Title Game
2	KS-Kapālama	0	2	.000	Lost 2025 Title Game; Lost 2026 Title Game
1	Kapolei	1	0	1.000	Won 2026 Title Game
1	Campbell	1	0	1.000	Won 2025 Title Game
1	Punahou	0	1	.000	Lost 2022 Title Game

=== Division I Championship Game wins and appearances by school ===
Appearances	School	W	L	Pct	Games
10	Kahuku	8	2	.800	Lost 1999 Title Game; Won 2000 Title Game; Won 2001 Title Game; Won 2003 Title Game; Won 2005 Title Game; Won 2006 Title Game; Lost 2009 Title Game; Won 2011 Title Game; Won 2012 Title Game; Won 2015 Title Game
9	St. Louis	3	6	.333	Won 1999 Title Game; Lost 2000 Title Game; Lost 2001 Title Game; Won 2002 Title Game; Lost 2003 Title Game; Lost 2006 Title Game; Lost 2007 Title Game; Won 2010 Title Game; Lost 2015 Title Game
6	Punahou	3	3	.500	Lost 2005 Title Game; Won 2008 Title Game; Lost 2011 Title Game; Lost 2012 Title Game; Won 2013 Title Game; Lost 2014 Title Game
3	Waipahu	2	1	.666	Won 2018 Title Game; Lost 2022 Title Game; Won 2023 Title Game
3	Mililani	2	1	.666	Lost 2013 Title Game; Won 2014 Title Game; Won 2016 Title Game
3	Hilo	2	1	.666	Won 2017 Title Game; Lost 2018 Title Game; Won 2019 Title Game
3	Leilehua	1	2	.333	Lost 2004 Title Game; Won 2007 Title Game; Lost 2008 Title Game
3	Konawaena	1	2	.333	Won 2022 Title Game; Lost 2023 Title Game; Lost 2024 Title Game
2	KS-Kapālama	2	0	1.000	Won 2004 Title Game; Won 2009 Title Game
2	'Iolani	1	1	.500	Lost 2016 Title Game; Won 2021 Title Game
2	Kapa'a	1	1	.500	Won 2024 Title Game; Lost 2025 Title Game
1	Kailua	1	0	1.000	Won 2025 Title Game
1	Castle	0	1	.000	Lost 2002 Title Game
1	Waianae	0	1	.000	Lost 2010 Title Game
1	Damien	0	1	.000	Lost 2017 Title Game
1	Lahainaluna	0	1	.000	Lost 2021 Title Game

=== Division II ===
Year	Winner	Score	Opponent
2003	Aiea (OIA)	9-7	Damien (ILH)
2004	Campbell (OIA)	28-7	'Iolani (ILH)
2005	'Iolani (ILH)	34-20	Radford (OIA)
2006	King Kekaulike (MIL)	33-20	Kauai (KIF)
2007	'Iolani (ILH)	28-21	Lahainaluna (MIL)
2008	'Iolani (ILH)	35-20	Radford (OIA)
2009	'Iolani (ILH)	24-17	Kauai (KIF)
2010	'Iolani (ILH)	49-14	Kaimuki (OIA)
2011	'Iolani (ILH)	34-0	Waipahu (OIA)
2012	'Iolani (ILH)	36-33	Lahainaluna (MIL)
2013	Kaiser (OIA)	17-7	Kauai (KIF)
2014	'Iolani (ILH)	31-14	Lahainaluna (MIL)
2015	Radford (OIA)	30-16	Kapaa (KIF)
2016	Lahainaluna (MIL)	21-14	Kapaa (KIF)
2017	Lahainaluna (MIL)	75-69	Konawaena (BIIF)
2018	Lahainaluna (MIL)	34-32	Kapaa (KIF)
2019	Lahainaluna (MIL)	21-10	Kapaa (KIF)
2021	Kapaa (KIF)	61-7	KS-Maui (MIL)
2022	Waimea (KIF)	45-6	King Kekaulike (MIL)
2023	Waimea (KIF)	31-28	KS-Maui (MIL)
2024	KS-Maui (MIL)	37-14	Kaiser (OIA)
2025	KS-Maui (MIL)	48-24	Waimea (KIF)

=== Division II Championship Game wins and appearances by school ===
Appearances	School	W	L	Pct	Games
9	'Iolani	8	1	.889	Lost 2004 Title Game; Won 2005 Title Game; Won 2007 Title Game; Won 2008 Title Game; Won 2009 Title Game; Won 2010 Title Game; Won 2011 Title Game; Won 2012 Title Game; Won 2014 Title Game
7	Lahainaluna	4	3	.571	Lost 2007 Title Game; Lost 2012 Title Game; Lost 2014 Title Game; Won 2016 Title Game; Won 2017 Title Game; Won 2018 Title Game; Won 2019 Title Game
5	Kapaa	1	4	.200	Lost 2015 Title Game; Lost 2016 Title Game; Lost 2018 Title Game; Lost 2019 Title Game; Won 2021 Title Game
4	KS-Maui	2	2	.500	Lost 2021 Title Game; Lost 2023 Title Game; Won 2024 Title Game; Won 2025 Title Game
3	Kauai	0	3	.000	Lost 2006 Title Game; Lost 2009 Title Game; Lost 2013 Title Game
3	Radford	1	2	.333	Lost 2005 Title Game; Lost 2008 Title Game; Won 2015 Title Game
3	Waimea	2	1	.666	Won 2022 Title Game; Won 2023 Title Game; Lost 2025 Title Game
2	Kaiser	1	1	.500	Won 2013 Title Game; Lost 2024 Title Game
2	King Kekaulike	1	1	.500	Won 2006 Title Game; Lost 2022 Title Game
1	Aiea	1	0	1.000	Won 2003 Title Game
1	Campbell	1	0	1.000	Won 2004 Title Game
1	Damien	0	1	.000	Lost 2003 Title Game
1	Kaimuki	0	1	.000	Lost 2010 Title Game
1	Waipahu	0	1	.000	Lost 2011 Title Game
1	Konawaena	0	1	.000	Lost 2017 Title Game

== 1999 HHSAA Tournament Brackets ==
=== Division I ===
First Round
Nov 19 @ Aloha Stadium
St. Louis	53
Waianae	21
Nov 19 @ Vidinha Stadium
Waimea	20
Kailua	18
Nov 19 @ Aloha Stadium
Kahuku	47
Konawaena	14
Nov 19 @ War Memorial
Baldwin	25
Farrington	19

Semifinals
Nov 26 @ Aloha Stadium
St. Louis	56
Waimea	0
Nov 26 @ Aloha Stadium
Kahuku	27
Baldwin	12

Championship
Dec 4 @ Aloha Stadium
St. Louis	19
Kahuku	0

DIVISION I STATE CHAMPION: St. Louis

RUNNER-UP: Kahuku

== 2000 HHSAA Tournament Brackets ==
=== Division I ===
First Round
Nov 17 @ Aloha Stadium
St. Louis	48
Castle	0
Nov 17 @ War Memorial
Maui	0
Waianae	21
Nov 17 @ Aloha Stadium
Kahuku	43
Waimea	17
Nov 17 @ Wong Stadium
Hilo	0
Kaimuki	20

Semifinals
Nov 24 @ Aloha Stadium
St. Louis	63
Waianae	10
Nov 24 @ Aloha Stadium
Kahuku	41
Kaimuki	26

Championship
Dec 1 @ Aloha Stadium
St. Louis	20
Kahuku	26

DIVISION I STATE CHAMPION: Kahuku

RUNNER-UP: St. Louis

== 2001 HHSAA Tournament Brackets ==
=== Division I ===
First Round
Nov 16 @ Aloha Stadium
St. Louis	54
Aiea	7
Nov 16 @ Wong Stadium
Waiakea	8
Kailua	53
Nov 16 @ Aloha Stadium
Kahuku	57
Lahainaluna	14
Nov 16 @ Vidinha Stadium
Waimea	41
Castle	20

Semifinals
Nov 23 @ Aloha Stadium
St. Louis	49
Kailua	7
Nov 23 @ Aloha Stadium
Kahuku	21
Waimea	7

Championship
Nov 30 @ Aloha Stadium
St. Louis	14
Kahuku	21

DIVISION I STATE CHAMPION: Kahuku

RUNNER-UP: St. Louis

== 2002 HHSAA Tournament Brackets ==
=== Division I ===
First Round
Nov 22 @ Aloha Stadium
1	St. Louis	41
Farrington	23
Nov 22 @ Vidinha Stadium
4	Waimea	24
Kailua	21
Nov 22 @ Aloha Stadium
2	Castle	35
Hawaii Prep	0
Nov 22 @ War Memorial
3	Baldwin	14
McKinley	28

Semifinals
Nov 29 @ Aloha Stadium
1	St. Louis	51
4	Waimea	0
Nov 29 @ Aloha Stadium
2	Castle	27*
McKinley	21*

Championship
Dec 6 @ Aloha Stadium
1	St. Louis	34
2	Castle	15

*Denotes overtime game

DIVISION I STATE CHAMPION: St. Louis

RUNNER-UP: Castle

== 2003 HHSAA Tournament Brackets ==
=== Division I ===
First Round
Nov 21 @ Aloha Stadium
1	Kahuku	41
Kaua'i	3
Nov 21 @ Kea'au
4	Hilo	0
Farrington	27
Nov 21 @ War Memorial
3	Baldwin	20
Kailua	13
Nov 21 @ Aloha Stadium
2	St. Louis	47
Mililani	12

Semifinals
Nov 28 @ Aloha Stadium
1	Kahuku	35
Farrington	7
Nov 28 @ Aloha Stadium
3	Baldwin	6
2	St. Louis	48

Championship
Dec 5 @ Aloha Stadium
1	Kahuku	27
2	St. Louis	26

DIVISION I STATE CHAMPION: Kahuku

RUNNER-UP: St. Louis

=== Division II ===
First Round
Nov 21 @ 'Aiea
Damien	20
Kapolei	14
Nov 22 @ War Memorial
Lahainaluna	21
Hawaii Prep	14

Semifinals
Nov 28 @ Vidinha Stadium
1	Waimea	13
Damien	17
Nov 28 @ KS-Oahu
2	Aiea	24
Lahainaluna	14

Championship
Dec 5 @ Aloha Stadium
Damien	7
2	Aiea	9

DIVISION II STATE CHAMPION: Aiea

RUNNER-UP: Damien

== 2004 HHSAA Tournament Brackets ==
=== Division I ===
First Round
Nov 19 @ Kealakehe
Kealakehe	7
Leilehua	28
Nov 19 @ War Memorial
Lahainaluna	41
Mililani	34

Semifinals
Nov 26 @ Aloha Stadium
1	Kahuku	14
Leilehua	17
Nov 26 @ Aloha Stadium
2	KS-Kapālama	21
Lahainaluna	6

Championship
Dec 3 @ Aloha Stadium
Leilehua	7
2	KS-Kapālama	28

DIVISION I STATE CHAMPION: KS-Kapālama

RUNNER-UP: Leilehua

=== Division II ===
First Round
Nov 19 @ Radford
Waipahu	16
Hawaii Prep	41
Nov 19 @ Vidinha
PAC-3	7
Kaua'i	49

Semifinals
Nov 27 @ KS-Oahu
1	'Iolani	17
Hawaii Prep	7
Nov 26 @ Moanalua
2	Campbell	29
Kaua'i	20

Championship
Dec 3 @ Aloha Stadium
1	'Iolani	7
2	Campbell	28

DIVISION II STATE CHAMPION: Campbell

RUNNER-UP: 'Iolani

== 2005 HHSAA Tournament Brackets ==
=== Division I ===
First Round
Nov 18 @ Kealakehe
4	Kealakehe	14
Waianae	21
Nov 19 @ Aloha Stadium
3	Punahou	35
Aiea	14

Semifinals
Nov 26 @ Aloha Stadium
1	Kahuku	43
Waianae	0
Nov 26 @ Aloha Stadium
2	Baldwin	7
3	Punahou	30

Championship
Dec 2 @ Aloha Stadium
1	Kahuku	28
3	Punahou	21

DIVISION I STATE CHAMPION: Kahuku

RUNNER-UP: Punahou

=== Division II ===
First Round
Nov 18 @ Moanalua
4	KS-Hawaii	20
Moanalua	34
Nov 18 @ Hanapepe
3	Kaua'i	7
KS-Maui	14

Semifinals
Nov 26 @ 'Iolani
1	'Iolani	48
Moanalua	20
Nov 26 @ Radford
2	Radford	37
KS-Maui	27

Championship
Dec 2 @ Aloha Stadium
1	'Iolani	34
2	Radford	20

DIVISION II STATE CHAMPION: 'Iolani

RUNNER-UP: Radford

== 2006 HHSAA Tournament Brackets ==
=== Division I ===
First Round
Nov 17 @ Waianae
4	Kealakehe	14
Waianae	28
Nov 17 @ War Memorial
3	Baldwin	22
Mililani	17

Semifinals
Nov 24 @ Aloha Stadium
1	St. Louis	10
Waianae	7
Nov 24 @ Aloha Stadium
2	Kahuku	22
3	Baldwin	20

Championship
Dec 1 @ Aloha Stadium
1	St. Louis	6
2	Kahuku	7

DIVISION I STATE CHAMPION: Kahuku

RUNNER-UP: St. Louis

=== Division II ===
First Round
Nov 17 @ KS-Hawaii
4	KS-Hawaii	12
Waipahu	27
Nov 18 @ 'Iolani
3	Iolani	41
Kaimuki	40

Semifinals
Nov 24 @ Vidinha Stadium
1	Kaua'i	17
Waipahu	6
Nov 24 @ War Memorial
2	King Kekaulike	38
3	'Iolani	37

Championship
Dec 1 @ Aloha Stadium
1	Kaua'i	20
2	King Kekaulike	33

DIVISION II STATE CHAMPION: King Kekaulike

RUNNER-UP: Kaua'i

== 2007 HHSAA Tournament Brackets ==
=== Division I ===
First Round
November 17 @ Kealakehe
4	Kealakehe	17
Waianae	21
November 17 @ War Memorial
3	Baldwin	26
Farrington	14

Semifinals
November 24 @ Aloha Stadium
1	St. Louis	44
Waianae	6
November 24 @ Aloha Stadium
2	Leilehua	41
3	Baldwin	34

Championship
November 30 @ Aloha Stadium
1	St. Louis	16
2	Leilehua	20

DIVISION I STATE CHAMPION: Leilehua

RUNNER-UP: St. Louis

=== Division II ===
First Round
November 17 @ Kaiser
4	Kaimuki	22
KS-Hawaii	0
November 17 @ Vidinha Stadium
3	Kaua'i	40
Roosevelt	9

Semifinals
November 24 @ War Memorial
1	Lahainaluna	52
4	Kaimuki	20
November 24 @ Aloha Stadium
2	'Iolani	35
3	Kaua'i	21

Championship
November 30 @ Aloha Stadium
1	Lahainaluna	21
2	'Iolani	28

DIVISION II STATE CHAMPION: 'Iolani

RUNNER-UP: Lahainaluna

== 2008 HHSAA Tournament Brackets ==
=== Division I ===
First Round
November 21 @ Roosevelt
4	Kealakehe	13
Farrington	30
November 21 @ War Memorial
3	Baldwin	15
Leilehua	34

Semifinals
November 28 @ Aloha Stadium
1	Punahou	35
Farrington	28
November 28 @ Aloha Stadium
2	Kahuku	*10
Leilehua	*17

Championship
December 5 @ Aloha Stadium
1	Punahou	38
Leilehua	7

* Denotes overtime game

DIVISION I STATE CHAMPION: Punahou

RUNNER-UP: Leilehua

=== Division II ===
First Round
November 21 @ Konawaena
4	Campbell	25
Konawaena	15
November 21 @ Vidinha Stadium
3	Kaua'i	7
Radford	17

Semifinals
November 28 @ Roosevelt
1	'Iolani	24
4	Campbell	6
November 28 @ War Memorial
2	Lahainaluna	27
Radford	33

Championship
December 5 @ Aloha Stadium
1	'Iolani	35
Radford	20

DIVISION II STATE CHAMPION: 'Iolani

RUNNER-UP: Radford

== 2009 HHSAA Tournament Brackets ==
=== Division I ===
First Round
Nov 20 @ Kealakehe
4	Honoka‘a	16
Farrington	48
Nov 20 @ War Memorial
3	Baldwin	12
Leilehua	48

Semifinals
Nov 27 @ Aloha Stadium
1	Kahuku	9
Farrington	6
Nov 27 @ Aloha Stadium
2	KS-Oahu	40
Leilehua	0

Championship
Dec 4 @ Aloha Stadium
1	Kahuku	21
2	KS-Oahu	34

* Denotes overtime game

DIVISION I STATE CHAMPION: KS-Oahu

RUNNER-UP: Kahuku

=== Division II ===
First Round
Nov 20 @ 'Aiea
4	Lahainaluna	12
6	Aiea	20
Nov 20 @ Moanalua
3	Moanalua	14
5	Hawai'i Prep	17

Semifinals
Nov 27 @ Radford
1	'Iolani	21
6	'Aiea	7
Nov 27 @ Vidinha Stadium
2	Kaua'i	28
5	Hawai'i Prep	14

Championship
Aloha Stadium
1	'Iolani	24
2	Kaua'i	17

* Denotes overtime game

DIVISION II STATE CHAMPION: 'Iolani

RUNNER-UP: Kauai

== 2010 HHSAA Tournament Brackets ==
=== Division I ===
First Round
Nov 12 @ Waianae
4	Kealakehe	16
Waianae	34
Nov 12 @ War Memorial
3	Baldwin	26
Leilehua	35

Semifinals
Nov 19 @ Aloha Stadium
1	Mililani	41
Waianae	48
Nov 19 @ Aloha Stadium
2	St. Louis	42
Leilehua	28

Championship
Nov 26 @ Aloha Stadium
Waianae	13
2	St. Louis	36

* Denotes overtime game

DIVISION I STATE CHAMPION: St. Louis

RUNNER-UP: Waianae

=== Division II ===
First Round
Nov 13 @ Kaua'i
4	Kaua'i	17
Kalaheo	13
Nov 12 @ Kea'au
3	Kaimuki	14
KS-Hawaii	9

Semifinal
Nov 20 @ 'Iolani
1	'Iolani	14
4	Kauai	0
Nov 19 @ War Memorial
2	Lahainaluna	27*
3	Kaimuki	28*

Championship
Nov 26 @ Aloha Stadium
1	'Iolani	49
3	Kaimuki	14

* Denotes overtime game

DIVISION II STATE CHAMPION: 'Iolani

RUNNER-UP: Kaimuki

== 2011 HHSAA Tournament Brackets ==
=== Division I ===
First Round
Nov 11 @ Kealakehe
4	Kealakehe	24
Leilehua	35
Nov 11 @ War Memorial
3	Baldwin	28
Farrington	24

Semifinals
Nov 18 @ Aloha Stadium
1	Kahuku	13
Leilehua	10
Nov 18 @ Aloha Stadium
2	Punahou	35
3	Baldwin	0

Championship
Nov 25 @ Aloha Stadium
1	Kahuku	30
2	Punahou	24

DIVISION I STATE CHAMPION: Kahuku

RUNNER-UP: Punahou

=== Division II ===
First Round
Nov 12 @ Vidinha Stadium
4	Kapa'a	7
Pearl City	0
Nov 12 @ War Memorial
3	Lahainaluna	23
Konawaena	6

Semifinals
Nov 19 @ 'Iolani
1	'Iolani	17
4	Kapa'a	13
Nov 18 @ Waipahu
2	Waipahu	19
3	Lahainaluna	14

Championship
Nov 25 @ Aloha Stadium
1	'Iolani	34
2	Waipahu	0

DIVISION II STATE CHAMPION: 'Iolani

RUNNER-UP: Waipahu

== 2012 HHSAA Tournament Brackets ==
=== Division I ===
First Round
Nov 9 @ Kealakehe
4	Kealakehe	25
Farrington	34
Nov 9 @ War Memorial
3	Baldwin	13
Mililani	24

Semifinals
Nov 16 @ Aloha Stadium
1	Kahuku	47
Farrington	14
Nov 16 @ Aloha Stadium
2	Punahou	49
Mililani	19

Championship
Nov 23 @ Aloha Stadium
1	Kahuku	42
2	Punahou	20

DIVISION I STATE CHAMPION: Kahuku

RUNNER-UP: Punahou

=== Division II ===
First Round
Nov 10 @ Vidinha Stadium
4	Kaua'i	21
Radford	22
Nov 10 @ Konawaena
3	Konawaena	23
Nanakuli	25

Semifinals
Nov 17 @ Aloha Stadium
1	'Iolani	43
4	Radford	0
Nov 17 @ Aloha Stadium
2	Lahainaluna	28
Nanakuli	0

Championship
Nov 23 @ Aloha Stadium
1	'Iolani	36
2	Lahainaluna	33

DIVISION II STATE CHAMPION: 'Iolani

RUNNER-UP: Lahainaluna

== 2013 HHSAA Tournament Brackets ==
=== Division I ===
First Round
Nov 8 @ War Memorial
4	Baldwin	3
Farrington	21
Nov 8 @ Keaʻau
3	Hilo	27
Campbell	42

Semifinal
Nov 15 @ Aloha Stadium
1	Punahou	48
Farrington	6
Nov 15 @ Aloha Stadium
2	Mililani	41
Campbell	7

Championship
Nov 23 @ Aloha Stadium
1	Punahou	28
2	Mililani	22

DIVISION I STATE CHAMPION: Punahou

RUNNER-UP: Mililani

=== Division II ===
First Round
Nov 9 @ Kaiser
4	Kaiser	59
Konawaena	6
Nov 9 @ Vidinha Stadium
3	Kaua'i	13
Pearl City	7

Semifinals
Nov 16 @ War Memorial
1	Lahainaluna	9
4	Kaiser	20
Nov 16 @ ʻIolani
2	'Iolani	7
3	Kaua'i	28

Championship
Nov 23 @ Aloha Stadium
4	Kaiser	17
3	Kaua'i	7

DIVISION II STATE CHAMPION: Kaiser

RUNNER-UP: Kaua'i

== 2014 HHSAA Tournament Brackets ==
=== Division I ===
First Round
Nov 7 @ Aloha Stadium
Kahuku	20
Hilo	10
Nov 7 @ Aloha Stadium
Farrington	22
Maui	6

Semifinals
Nov 15 @ Aloha Stadium
1	Punahou	13
Kahuku	10
Nov 15 @ Aloha Stadium
2	Mililani	17
Farrington	14

Championship
Nov 21 @ Aloha Stadium
1	Punahou	45
2	Mililani	53

DIVISION I STATE CHAMPION: Mililani

RUNNER-UP: Punahou

=== Division II ===
First Round
Nov 8 @ KS-Hawaii
KS-Hawaii	42
Nanakuli	20
Nov 8 @ Vidinha Stadium
Kapa'a	30
Pearl City	22

Semifinals
Nov 15 @ War Memorial
1	Lahainaluna	52
KS-Hawaii	7
Nov 15 @ 'Iolani
2	'Iolani	29
Kapa'a	24

Championship
Nov 21 @ Aloha Stadium
1	Lahainaluna	14
2	'Iolani	31

DIVISION II STATE CHAMPION: 'Iolani

RUNNER-UP: Lahainaluna

== 2015 HHSAA Tournament Brackets ==
=== Division I ===
First Round
Nov 6 @ Aloha Stadium
Baldwin	6
Waianae	21
Nov 6 @ Aloha Stadium
Hilo	18
Mililani	62

Semifinals
Nov 13 @ Aloha Stadium
1	Kahuku	13
Waianae	0
Nov 13 @ Aloha Stadium
2	St. Louis	56
Mililani	30

Championship
Nov 20 @ Aloha Stadium
1	Kahuku	39
2	St. Louis	14

DIVISION I STATE CHAMPION: Kahuku

RUNNER-UP: St. Louis

=== Division II ===
First Round
Nov 7 @ Lahainaluna
Lahainaluna	7
Kaimuki	0
Nov 7 @ Konawaena
Konawaena	42
Damien	33

Semifinals
Nov 14 @ Vidinha Stadium
1	Kapa'a	24
Lahainaluna	0
Nov 14 @ Roosevelt
2	Radford	48
Konawaena	46

Championship
Nov 20 @ Aloha Stadium
1	Kapa'a	16
2	Radford	30

DIVISION II STATE CHAMPION: Radford

RUNNER-UP: Kapa'a

== 2016 HHSAA Tournament Brackets ==
=== Open Division ===
First Round
Nov 5 @ Aloha Stadium
Punahou	21
Kapolei	33
Nov 5 @ Aloha Stadium
Farrington	8
Wai'anae	14

Semifinals
Nov 11 @ Aloha Stadium
1	Kahuku	54
Kapolei	7
Nov 11 @ Aloha Stadium
2	St. Louis	42
Wai'anae	7

Championship
Nov 19 @ Aloha Stadium
1	Kahuku	14
2	St. Louis	30

OPEN DIVISION STATE CHAMPION: St. Louis

RUNNER-UP: Kahuku

=== Division I ===
First Round
Nov 5 @ Keaau
1	Hilo	25
Leilehua	26
Nov 5 @ War Memorial
4	Baldwin	28
Mililani	49
Nov 5 @ Campbell
2	Campbell	48
Waiakea	0
Nov 5 @ Roosevelt
3	'Iolani	17
Moanalua	14

Semifinals
Nov 11 @ Mililani
Leilehua	35
Mililani	51
Nov 11 @ Mililani
2	Campbell	12
3	'Iolani	35

Championship
Nov 18 @ Aloha Stadium
Mililani	31
3	'Iolani	20

DIVISION I STATE CHAMPION: Mililani

RUNNER-UP: 'Iolani

=== Division II ===
First Round
Nov 4 @ Campbell
4	Damien	40
Waialua	0
Nov 4 @ War Memorial
3	Lahainaluna	52
Waipahu	14

Semifinals
Nov 12 @ Vidinha Stadium
1	Kapa'a	21
4	Damien	14
Nov 12 @ Konawaena
2	Konawaena	14
3	Lahainaluna	28

Championship
Nov 18 @ Aloha Stadium
1	Kapa'a	14
3	Lahainaluna	21

DIVISION II STATE CHAMPION: Lahainaluna

RUNNER-UP: Kapa'a

== 2017 HHSAA Tournament Brackets ==
=== Open Division ===
Semifinals
Nov 10 @ Aloha Stadium
Kahuku	10
Waianae	7
Nov 10 @ Aloha Stadium
St. Louis	47
Mililani	23

Championship
Nov 18 @ Aloha Stadium
Kahuku	28
St. Louis	31

OPEN DIVISION STATE CHAMPION: St. Louis

RUNNER-UP: Kahuku

=== Division I ===
Semifinals
Nov 4 @ Wong Stadium
1	Hilo	26
Maui	7
Nov 10 @ Vidinha Stadium
2	Kauai	10
Damien	13

Championship
Nov 18 @ Aloha Stadium
1	Hilo	35
Damien	19

DIVISION I STATE CHAMPION: Hilo

RUNNER-UP: Damien

=== Division II ===
Semifinals
Nov 3 @ War Memorial
1	Lahainaluna	35
'Iolani	27
Nov 3 @ Konawaena
2	Konawaena	53
Waipahu	50

Championship
Nov 18 @ Aloha Stadium
1	Lahainaluna	75*
2	Konawaena	69*

* Denotes overtime game

DIVISION II STATE CHAMPION: Lahainaluna

RUNNER-UP: Konawaena

== 2018 HHSAA Tournament Brackets ==
=== Open Division ===
Semifinals
Nov 9 @ Aloha Stadium
1	St. Louis	49
4	Kahuku	22
Nov 9 @ Aloha Stadium
2	Mililani	24
3	Campbell	2

Championship
Nov 24 @ Aloha Stadium
1	St. Louis	38
2	Mililani	17

OPEN DIVISION STATE CHAMPION: St. Louis

RUNNER-UP: Mililani

=== Division I ===
Semifinals
Nov 9 @ Keaau
1	Hilo	35
4	Maui	24
Nov 9 @ Waipahu
2	Waipahu	20
3	'Iolani	19

Championship
Nov 24 @ Aloha Stadium
1	Hilo	22
2	Waipahu	42

DIVISION I STATE CHAMPION: Waipahu

RUNNER-UP: Hilo

=== Division II ===
First Round
Nov 10 @ Roosevelt
4	Roosevelt	20
Pac-5	7
Nov 10 @ KS-Hawaii
3	KS-Hawaii	27
Kaimuki	28

Semifinals
Nov 17 @ Lahainaluna
1	Lahainaluna	48
4	Roosevelt	10
Nov 17 @ Vidinha Stadium
2	Kapa'a	20
Kaimuki	12

Championship
Nov 24 @ Aloha Stadium
1	Lahainaluna	34
2	Kapa'a	32

DIVISION II STATE CHAMPION: Lahainaluna

RUNNER-UP: Kapa'a

== 2019 HHSAA Tournament Brackets ==
=== Open Division ===
Semifinals
Nov 22 @ Aloha Stadium
1	St. Louis	35
4	Mililani	0
Nov 22 @ Aloha Stadium
2	Kahuku	21
3	Campbell	19

Championship
Nov 29 @ Aloha Stadium
1	St. Louis	45
2	Kahuku	6

OPEN DIVISION STATE CHAMPION: St. Louis

RUNNER-UP: Kahuku

=== Division I ===
First Round
Nov 15 @ War Memorial
4	Baldwin	7
Leilehua	34

Semifinals
Nov 23 @ Wong Stadium
1	Hilo	19
Leilehua	9
Nov 23 @ Moanalua
2	Moanalua	9
3	'Iolani	35

Championship
Nov 29 Aloha Stadium
1	Hilo	20
3	'Iolani	17

DIVISION I STATE CHAMPION: Hilo

RUNNER-UP: 'Iolani

=== Division II ===
First Round
Nov 16 @ KS-Hawaii
4	KS-Hawaii	7
Roosevelt	31

Semifinals
Nov 23 @ Lahainaluna
1	Lahainaluna	35
Roosevelt	0
Nov 23 @ Vidinha Stadium
2	Kapa'a	35
3	Kaimuki	28

Championship
Nov 29 @ Aloha Stadium
1	Lahainaluna	21
2	Kapa'a	10

DIVISION II STATE CHAMPION: Lahainaluna

RUNNER-UP: Kapa'a

== 2021 HHSAA Tournament Brackets ==
=== Open Division ===
Semifinals
Dec 18 @ Farrington
1	Kahuku	21
4	Campbell	0
Dec 18 @ Farrington
2	St. Louis	27
3	Mililani	25

Championship
Dec 23 @ Farrington
1	Kahuku	49
2	St. Louis	14

OPEN DIVISION STATE CHAMPION: Kahuku

RUNNER-UP: St. Louis

=== Division I ===
Semifinals
Dec 17 @ Farrington
1	Lahainaluna	30
4	Konawaena	7
Dec 17 @ Farrington
2	'Iolani	21
3	Aiea	0

Championship
Dec 23 @ Farrington
1	Lahainaluna	0
2	'Iolani	38

DIVISION I STATE CHAMPION: 'Iolani

RUNNER-UP: Lahainaluna

=== Division II ===
Semifinals
Dec 22 @ Farrington
1	Kapa'a	51
4	Hawaii Prep	0
Dec 22 @ Farrington
2	Kaiser	24
3	KS-Maui	48

Championship
Dec 30 @ Farrington
1	Kapa'a	61
3	KS-Maui	7

DIVISION II STATE CHAMPION: Kapa'a

RUNNER-UP: KS-Maui

- All state tournaments games are held at Farrington High School’s Skippa Diaz Stadium due to construction at Aloha Stadium.

== 2022 HHSAA Tournament Brackets ==
=== Open Division ===
Semifinals
Nov 18 @ Mililani
1	Kahuku	32
Campbell	7
Nov 18 @ Mililani
2	Punahou	52
Mililani	24

Championship
Nov 25 @ Mililani
1	Kahuku	20
2	Punahou	0

OPEN DIVISION STATE CHAMPION: Kahuku

RUNNER-UP: Punahou

=== Division I ===
First Round
Nov 11 @ Waipahu
4	Waipahu	49
5	Kapa'a	41
Nov 11 @ Lahainaluna
3	Lahainaluna	10
6	Aiea	30

Semifinals
Nov 19 @ 'Iolani School
1	'Iolani	10
4	Waipahu	35
Nov 19 @ Konawaena
2	Konawaena	27
6	Aiea	24

Championship
Nov 26 @ Mililani
4	Waipahu	28
2	Konawaena	38

DIVISION I STATE CHAMPION: Konawaena

RUNNER-UP: Waipahu

=== Division II ===
First Round
Nov 12 @ Nanakuli
4	Nanakuli	38
5	Pac-5	6
Nov 12 @ Hanapepe Stadium
3	Waimea	48
6	Kaiser	7

Semifinals
Nov 19 @ King Kekaulike
1	King Kekaulike	20
4	Nanakuli	0
Nov 19 @ Honoka‘a
2	Honoka‘a	0
3	Waimea	17

Championship
Nov 26 @ Mililani
1	King Kekaulike	6
3	Waimea	45

DIVISION II STATE CHAMPION: Waimea

RUNNER-UP: King Kekaulike

== 2023 HHSAA Tournament Brackets ==
=== Open Division ===
Semifinals
Nov 17 @ Mililani
1	Mililani	44
Campbell	7
Nov 17 @ Mililani
2	Punahou	16
Kahuku	28

Championship
Nov 24 @ T.C. Ching
1	Mililani	19
Kahuku	21

OPEN DIVISION STATE CHAMPION: Kahuku

RUNNER-UP: Mililani

=== Division I ===
First Round
Nov 11 @ Lahainaluna
4	Lahainaluna	28
5	Kapa'a	29
Nov 11 @ Kaiser
3	Damien	26
Farrington	48

Semifinals
Nov 18 @ Konawaena
1	Konawaena	37
5	Kapa'a	19
Nov 18 @ Waipahu
2	Waipahu	21
Farrington	20

Championship
Nov 25 @ Mililani
1	Konawaena	28
2	Waipahu	53

DIVISION I STATE CHAMPION: Waipahu

RUNNER-UP: Konawaena

=== Division II ===
First Round
Nov 10 @ Roosevelt
4	Roosevelt	19
5	KS-Hawaii	14
Nov 10 @ Roosevelt
3	Pac-5	32
Kaimuki	7

Semifinals
Nov 18 @ Hanapepe
1	Waimea	13
4	Roosevelt	10
Nov 18 @ KS-Maui
2	KS-Maui	31
3	Pac-5	10

Championship
Nov 25 @ Mililani
1	Waimea	31
2	KS-Maui	28

DIVISION II STATE CHAMPION: Waimea

RUNNER-UP: KS-Maui

== 2024 HHSAA Tournament Brackets ==
=== Open Division ===
Semifinals
Nov 15 @ Mililani
1	Kahuku	8
Mililani	6
Nov 15 @ Mililani
2	St. Louis	27
Campbell	24

Championship
Nov 29 @ T.C. Ching
1	Kahuku	10
2	St. Louis	17

OPEN DIVISION STATE CHAMPION: St. Louis

RUNNER-UP: Kahuku

=== Division I ===
First Round
Nov 16 @ Lahainaluna
4	Lahainaluna	13
5	Leilehua	40
Nov 16 @ Kapa'a
3	Kapa'a	38
Kailua	12

Semifinals
Nov 22 @ Konawaena
1	Konawaena	45
5	Leilehua	20
Nov 22 @ Farrington
2	Damien	33
3	Kapa'a	55

Championship
Nov 30 @ Mililani
1	Konawaena	7
3	Kapa'a	10

DIVISION I STATE CHAMPION: Kapa'a

RUNNER-UP: Konawaena

=== Division II ===
First Round
Nov 16 @ Roosevelt
4	Roosevelt	13
5	KS-Hawaii	7
Nov 16 @ Farrington
3	PAC-5	0
Kaiser	30

Semifinals
Nov 23 @ KS-Maui
1	KS-Maui	60
4	Roosevelt	26
Nov 23 @ Vidinha Stadium
2	Kaua'i	13
Kaiser	16

Championship
Nov 30 @ Mililani
1	KS-Maui	37
Kaiser	14

DIVISION II STATE CHAMPION: KS-Maui

RUNNER-UP: Kaiser

== 2025 HHSAA Tournament Brackets ==
=== Open Division ===
Semifinals
Nov 21 @ Mililani
1	Kahuku	12
Campbell	15
Nov 21 @ Mililani
2	KS-Oahu	31
Kapolei	10

Championship
Dec 5 @ T. C. Ching
Campbell	26*
2	KS-Kapālama	23*

* Denotes overtime game

OPEN DIVISION STATE CHAMPION: Campbell

RUNNER-UP: KS-Kapālama

=== Division I ===
First Round
Nov 15 @ Farrington
4	Damien	28
5	Baldwin	14
Nov 15 @ Kailua
3	Kailua	35
Aiea	7

Semifinals
Nov 22 @ Kapa'a
1	Kapa'a	31
4	Damien	26
Nov 22 @ Konawaena
2	Konawaena	7
3	Kailua	24

Championship
Nov 28 @ Mililani
1	Kapa'a	9
3	Kailua	13

DIVISION I STATE CHAMPION: Kailua

RUNNER-UP: Kapa'a

=== Division II ===
First Round
Nov 14 @ Farrington
4	PAC-5	6
5	KS-Hawaii	43
Nov 14 @ Roosevelt
3	Roosevelt	42
6	Pearl City	7

Semifinals
Nov 22 @ KS-Maui
1	KS-Maui	37
5	KS-Hawaii	18
Nov 22 @ Hanapepe
2	Waimea	27
3	Roosevelt	26

Championship
Nov 28 @ Mililani
1	KS-Maui	48
2	Waimea	24

DIVISION II STATE CHAMPION: KS-Maui

RUNNER-UP: Waimea

== 2026 HHSAA Tournament Brackets ==
=== Open Division ===
Semifinals
Nov 13 @ Mililani
1	Kapolei	28
Kahuku	10
Nov 13 @ Mililani
2	KS-Oahu	10
Mililani	7

Championship
Nov 21 @ T. C. Ching
1	Kapolei	30
2	KS-Kapālama	8

OPEN DIVISION STATE CHAMPION: Kapolei

RUNNER-UP: KS-Kapālama

=== Division I ===
First Round
Nov 14 @ Farrington
4	Damien	28
5	Baldwin	21
Nov 14 @ KS-Hawaii
3	KS-Hawaii	42
Aiea	7

Semifinals
Nov 20 @ Waipahu
1	Waipahu	42
4	Damien	0
Nov 21 @ Kapa'a
2	Kapa'a	24
3	KS-Hawaii	13

Championship
Nov 28 @ Mililani
1	Waipahu
2	Kapa'a

DIVISION I STATE CHAMPION:

RUNNER-UP:

=== Division II ===
First Round
Nov 14 @ Farrington
4	Kalaheo	61
5	PAC-5	21
Nov 14 @ Honokaa
3	Honokaa	20
Kaiser	22

Semifinals
Nov 20 @ KS-Maui
1	KS-Maui	29
4	Kalaheo	11
Nov 21 @ Hanapepe
2	Waimea	36
Kaiser	26

Championship
Nov 28 @ Mililani
1	KS-Maui
2	Waimea

DIVISION II STATE CHAMPION:

RUNNER-UP:

== HHSAA Division Classification ==
* Private School

Classifications as of 2025 season

=== Open Division ===
OIA
- CAMPBELL SABERS
- FARRINGTON GOVERNORS
- KAHUKU RED RAIDERS
- KAPOLEI HURRICANES
- LEILEHUA MULES
- MILILANI TROJANS

ILH
- KAMEHAMEHA* WARRIORS
- PUNAHOU* BUFFANBLU
- SAINT LOUIS* CRUSADERS

=== Division I ===
OIA
- 'AIEA NĀ ALI'I
- KAILUA SURFRIDERS
- KAISER COUGARS
- MOANALUA NA MENEHUNE
- NANAKULI GOLDEN HAWKS
- RADFORD RAMS
- WAIANAE SEARIDERS
- WAIPAHU MARAUDERS

ILH
- DAMIEN* MONARCHS
- 'IOLANI* RAIDERS

MIL
- BALDWIN BEARS
- LAHAINALUNA LUNAS
- MAUI SABERS

BIIF
- HILO VIKINGS
- KEA'AU COUGARS
- KEALAKEHE WAVERIDERS
- KONAWAENA WILDCATS
- WAIAKEA WARRIORS

KIF
- KAPA'A WARRIORS

=== Division II ===
OIA
- CASTLE KNIGHTS
- KAIMUKI BULLDOGS
- KALAHEO MUSTANGS
- KALANI FALCONS
- McKINLEY TIGERS
- PEARL CITY CHARGERS
- ROOSEVELT ROUGH RIDERS
- WAIALUA BULLDOGS

ILH
- PAC-FIVE WOLFPACK
- KAMEHAMEHA II* WARRIORS
- SAINT LOUIS II* CRUSADERS

MIL
- KAMEHAMEHA-MAUI* WARRIORS
- KING KEKAULIKE NĀ ALI'I
- MOLOKA'I* FARMERS

BIIF
- HAWAI'I PREP* KA MAKANI
- HONOKA'A DRAGONS
- KAMEHAMEHA-HAWAI'I* WARRIORS
- KA'U TROJANS
- KOHALA COWBOYS
- PAHOA DAGGERS

KIF
- KAUA'I RED RAIDERS
- WAIMEA MENEHUNES

=== 8 Man** ===
Maui
- HANA DRAGONS
- LANAI PINELADS

* Private School
** The HHSAA does not recognize a championship sport unless three or more leagues participate.
