= Oahu Interscholastic Association =

Governing body for high-school sports in Oahu, Hawaii, U.S.

- Formation: 1940
- Type: Athletic conference
- Location: Oahu, Hawaii
- Coordinates: 21.2919°N 157.8220°W
- Members: 24
- President: John Brummel (Mililani)
- Affiliations: Hawaii High School Athletic Association
- Website: www.oiasports.com

The Oahu Interscholastic Association (OIA) is an athletic conference composed of all public secondary schools on the island of Oahu, Hawaii, U.S.A. The OIA was first founded in 1940 as the Rural Oahu Interscholastic Association (ROIA). The five founding schools were Castle High School, Kahuku High School, Leilehua High School, Waialua High & Intermediate School and Waipahu High School. The OIA originally comprised all the rural schools on Oahu, which were all of the schools that were not situated in the main city of Honolulu. This changed however in 1970 with the addition of the five former public school members of the Interscholastic League of Honolulu – Farrington High School, Kaimuki High School, McKinley High School, Roosevelt High School and Kalani High School. After the public Honolulu schools joined, the league changed its identity from the ROIA to simply OIA to reflect the integration of all of the public high schools on the island.

The OIA now has 24 member schools who compete in 19 different junior varsity and varsity level sports. The league produces a number of quality athletic teams in a number of sports, especially football. The OIA concurs with the Hawaii Board of Education and Hawaii Department of Education in recognizing athletics as an integral part of the educational program of the high school and holds its athletes to a number of academic and behavioral standards.

== Mission statement ==
The mission of the OIA is to promote unity and cooperation amongst the member schools in the establishment and administration of policies and regulations for implementing an interscholastic athletic program. The association shall stress educational and cultural values, promote skills in competitive activities and foster sportsmanship and mutual respect.

== Members ==
Institution	Nickname	Location	Football Division	Enrollment	Home field (Football)	Logo
Aiea High School	Na Alii	Aiea	Division 1	1280	Kiyuna Say Stadium	
Anuenue School	Na Koa	Palolo	None	378	None	
Campbell High School	Sabers	Ewa Beach	Open Division	2890	Campbell Stadium	
Castle High School	Knights	Kaneohe	Division 2	1947	Castle Stadium	
DreamHouse Ewa Beach PCS	Na Hoku	Ewa Beach	None		None	
Farrington High School	Governors	Kalihi	Division 1	2579	Edward "Skippa" Diaz Stadium	
Hakipuu Learning Center		Kaneohe	None	94	None	
Halau Ku Mana		Manoa	None	99	None	
Hawaii Technology Academy		Waipahu	None		None	
Hawaii School for the Deaf and Blind		Waikiki	None	72	None	
Kahuku High School	Red Raiders	Kahuku	Open Division	1879	Carleton E. Weimer Field	
Kailua High School	Surfriders	Kailua	Open Division	972	Alex Kane Stadium	
Kaimuki High School	Bulldogs	Kaimuki	Division 2	550	Edward "Skippa" Diaz Stadium	
Kaiser High School	Cougars	Hawaii Kai	Division 2	1025	Kaiser Stadium	
Kalaheo High School	Mustangs	Kailua	Division 2	1060	Alex Kane Stadium	
Kalani High School	Falcons	Kahala	Division 2	1161	Kaiser Stadium	
Kamaile Academy		Waianae	None		None	
Kanu O Ka Aina PCS		Waimea	None		None	
Kapolei Charter School		Waimea	None		None	
Kapolei High School	Hurricanes	Kapolei	Open Division	2333	Alvin Nagasako Sports Complex	
Ke Kula O Samuel M. Kamakau		Kailua	None	115	None	
Leilehua High School	Mules	Wahiawa	Open Division	1878	Hugh Yoshida Stadium	
McKinley High School	Tigers	Honolulu	Division 2	1945	Ticky Vasconcellos Stadium	
Mililani High School	Trojans	Mililani	Open Division	2421	John Kauinana Stadium	
Moanalua High School	Na Menehune	Moanalua	Division 1	2016	Moanalua Stadium	
Myron B. Thompson Academy		Honolulu	None	552	None	
Nanakuli High School	Golden Hawks	Nanakuli	Division 1	1303	Nanakuli Stadium	
Pearl City High School	Chargers	Pearl City	Division 2	1980	Edwin "Bino" Neves Stadium	
Radford High School	Rams	Salt Lake	Division 1	1343	John E. Velasco Stadium	
Roosevelt High School	Rough Riders	Honolulu	Division 1	1672	Ticky Vasconcellos Stadium	
Waialua High School	Bulldogs	Waialua	Division 2	677	Toshi Nakasone Field	
Waianae High School	Seariders	Waianae	Division 1	2068	Raymond Torii Stadium	
Waipahu High School	Marauders	Waipahu	Division 1	2544	Waipahu Stadium	

== Baseball ==
The OIA divides its baseball teams into 3 conferences spanning 2 divisions: OIA Division 1 East, Division 1 East, and Division 2 (combined east–west).

Division 1 East

- Castle Knights
- Farrington Governors
- Kailua Surfriders
- Kaiser Cougars
- Kalani Falcons
- Moanalua Na Menehune
- Roosevelt Rough Riders

Division 1 West

- Aiea Na Alii
- Campbell Sabers
- Kapolei Hurricanes
- Leilehua Mighty Mules
- Mililani Trojans
- Pearl City Chargers
- Waianae Seariders

Division 2

- Kahuku Red Raiders
- Kaimuki Bulldogs
- Kalaheo Mustangs
- McKinley Tigers
- Nanakuli Golden Hawks
- Radford Rams
- Waialua Bulldogs
- Waipahu Marauders

== Football ==
Beginning in 2018, the OIA decided to divide its football teams into 3 divisions/conferences: the OIA Open Division, OIA D1, and OIA D2. Teams are realigned every 2 years based on performance of both the varsity and junior varsity.

OIA Open Division

- Campbell Sabers
- Farrington Governors
- Kahuku Red Raiders
- Kapolei Hurricanes
- Leilehua Mules
- Mililani Trojans

OIA D1

- Aiea Na 'Ali'i
- Kailua Surfriders
- Kaiser Cougars
- Moanalua Na Menehune
- Nanākuli Golden Hawks
- Radford Rams
- Wai'anae Seariders
- Waipahu Marauders

OIA D2

- Castle Knights
- Kaimuki Bulldogs
- Kalaheo Mustangs
- Kalani Falcons
- McKinley Tigers
- Pearl City Chargers
- Roosevelt Rough Riders
- Waialua Bulldogs

=== State Champions and Runners-up ===
See: Oahu Prep Bowl

==== Division I ====
Teams from the Oahu Interscholastic Association have competed in every Division I State Championship game since the creation of the championship in 1999. The OIA lost the first ever Division I state championship game in 1999 with the St. Louis Crusaders beating the Kahuku Red Raiders 19–0. In total, the OIA is 8–6 in the Division I State Championship.

Kahuku High School holds the current record for the most appearances (8) and wins (6) in the OIA and the state for the Division I title. Kahuku is also the current Division I champion after beating Punahou School 42–20 on November 23, 2012.

==== Division II ====
Teams from the OIA have competed in the Division II State Championship game 6 of the 10 times it was held from 2003 to 2012. The OIA has won only 2 (in 2003 and 2004).

Aiea High School and Campbell High School are the only 2 OIA schools to have won the HHSAA Division II State Championship. Radford High School holds the record for most appearances by the OIA with 2 (2005 and 2008). Iolani School currently holds the state record for most Division II State Championships with 7 wins of 8 appearances (including a 6-game winning streak since 2007).

=== Football Rivalries ===
Teams		Rivalry Name/Trophy	Last Meeting	
Campbell Sabers	Waipahu Marauders	The Cane Knife	October 11, 2024	55-18 Campbell
Campbell Sabers	Kapolei Hurricanes	Battle of the Ewa Plains	September 21, 2024	40-23 Campbell
Castle Knights	Kailua Surfriders	The Hammer	August, 25, 2023	30-15 Kailua
Kaimuki Bulldogs	Kalani Falcons	The Calabash Bowl	October 26, 2024	49-7 Kalani
Kaimuki Bulldogs	McKinley Tigers		October 5, 2024	9–7 McKinley
Kalani Falcons	Kaiser Cougars		September 20, 2019	49-7 Kaiser
Leilehua Mules	Radford Rams	The Spirit of Freedom Bowl	October 18, 2024	28-21 Leilehua
Leilehua Mules	Mililani Trojans		September 30, 2022	49-14 Mililani
Punahou Buffanblu	Roosevelt Rough Riders	The Paint Brush	August 12, 2011	38–0 Punahou
Kahuku Red Raiders	Farrington Governors		September 21, 2024	21-0 Kahuku
Kahuku Red Raiders	Saint Louis Crusaders		November 29, 2024	17-10 Saint Louis
Kahuku Red Raiders	Waianae Seariders	The Crunch Bowl	August 12, 2023	49–0 Kahuku
Farrington Governors	Wai'anae Seariders		November 12, 2021	49-20 Wai'anae
Farrington Governors	Kamehameha-Kapalama Warriors		September 21, 2019	28–25 Kamehameha
Farrington Governors	McKinley Tigers		September 14, 2013	25–13 Farrington
Waianae Seariders	Saint Louis Crusaders		October 11, 2019	56–26 Saint Louis
Moanalua Na Menehune	Radford Rams	Battle For Salt Lake	August 10, 2024	31-22 Moanalua

=== OIA Football Playoffs Bracket 2009 ===
RED Division

RED-West Seeding

1. Leilehua
2. Waianae
3. Kapolei
4. Mililani
5. Campbell

RED-East Seeding

1. Kahuku
2. Farrington
3. Castle
4. Kailua
5. Kaimuki

Wild Card @ Higher Seed
E4	Kailua	21
W5	Campbell	0
W4	Mililani	47
E5	Kaimuki	35

Quarterfinal @ Higher Seed
W1	Leilehua	29
E4	Kailua	13
E2	Farrington	26
W3	Kapolei	7
W2	Waianae	16
E3	Castle	23
E1	Kahuku	35
W4	Mililani	27

Semifinal @Aloha Stadium
W1	Leilehua	9
E2	Farrington	7
E3	Castle	14
E1	Kahuku	19

Championship @ Aloha Stadium
W1	Leilehua	20
E1	Kahuku	24

3rd Place @ Kaiser HS
E2	Farrington	42
E3	Castle	26

- RED-Champ: KAHUKU Red Raiders

- 2nd Place: LEILEHUA Mules

- 3rd Place:FARRINGTON Governors

Note: Will advance to play for HHSAA DI championship playoff. see HHSAA DI football championship bracket.

* Denotes Overtime Game

WHITE Division

Semifinal
1	Moanalua	21
4	Kalaheo	20
3	Aiea	7
2	Radford	0

Championship @ Aloha Stadium
Moanalua	21
Aiea	7

- WHITE-Champ: Moanalua Na Menehune

- 2nd Place: Aiea Na Ali'i

Note:

Will advance to play for HHSAA DII championship playoffs. see HHSAA DII football championship bracket.

=== OIA Football Playoffs Bracket 2010 ===
RED Division

RED-West Seeding

1. Mililani^
2. Leilehua^
3. Waianae^
4. Radford
5. Aiea

^ Clinched State Tournament Berth

RED-East Seeding

1. Kahuku
2. Kailua
3. Castle
4. Farrington
5. Moanalua

Wild Card @ Higher Seed
E4	Farrington	10
W5	Aiea	0
W4	Radford	29
E5	Moanalua	22

Quarterfinal @ Higher Seed
W1	Mililani	21
E4	Farrington	14
E2	Kailua	7
W3	Waianae	49
W2	Leilehua	26
E3	Castle	13
E1	Kahuku	52
W4	Radford	7

Semifinal @Aloha Stadium
W1	Mililani	38
W3	Waianae	28
W2	Leilehua	16
E1	Kahuku	46

Championship @ Aloha Stadium
W1	Mililani	0
E1	Kahuku	0 [FORFEIT]

2nd/3rd Place @ Leilehua HS
W2	Leilehua	28
W3	Waianae	20

- RED-Champ: Mililani

- 2nd Place: Leilehua

- 3rd Place: Waianae

Note:

Will advance to play for HHSAA DI championship playoff. see HHSAA DI football championship bracket.
* Denotes Overtime Game

WHITE Division

Semifinal
1	Kaimuki	14
4	Pearl City	13
3	Kalaheo	43
2	Waipahu	28

Championship @ Aloha Stadium
Kaimuki	48
Kalaheo	12

- WHITE-Champ: Kaimuki

- 2nd Place: Kalaheo

Note:Will advance to play for HHSAA DII championship playoffs. see HHSAA DII football championship bracket.

=== OIA Football Playoffs Bracket 2011 to Present ===
OIA Football Playoff Brackets for seasons 2011 to present can be found in their respective OIA season pages.

== OIA Sports ==
Baseball | Basketball (boys and girls) | Bowling | Cheerleading | Cross Country | Football | Golf | Judo | Paddling | Riflery | Soccer (boys and girls) | Softball | Soft Tennis | Swimming | Tennis | Track and Field | Volleyball (boys and girls) | Water Polo | Wrestling |
