= Prep Bowl =

Prep Bowl may refer to the following competitions:

- Chicago Prep Bowl
- Oahu Prep Bowl, later HHSAA State Football Championships, Hawaii
