= Waiākea High School =

Coordinates: 19.70098°N 155.07610°W

- Logo of Waiākea High School

Location
- 155 W. Kawili Street; Hilo, Hawaiʻi County, Hawaiʻi 96720; United States

Information
- Type: Public
- Motto: Learn for life!
- Established: 1976
- School district: Hawai'i Department of Education (Hawai'i District)
- Superintendent: Keith T. Hayashi
- Principal: Kelcy Koga
- Faculty: 77.00 (FTE)
- Grades: 9-12
- Gender: Coeducational
- Enrollment: 1,183 (2024-2025)
- Student to teacher ratio: 15.36
- Campus size: 43 acres
- Color: Navy White
- Athletics conference: BIIF
- Mascot: Warrior
- Rival: Hilo High School
- Accreditation: WASC, NCAC
- Newspaper: Ka Leo O Ke Koa
- Endowment: Waiakea High School Foundation
- Budget: $ 7,503,496
- Communities served: Waiākea, Waiakea-Uka
- Feeder schools: Waiākea Intermediate School
- Website: waiakeahigh.k12.hi.us

Waiākea High School is a public, co-educational secondary school in Hilo, Hawaii. The school's mascot is the Warrior. It is part of the Hawaii State Department of Education. Founded in 1976, the school graduated its first class in 1980. The campus boasts the sculpture Landscape on the Ocean by Satoru Abe. Waiākea High School's crosstown rival is Hilo High School.

The school is located at 155 West Kawili Street and sits on approximately 43-acres of land adjacent to feeding schools Waiākea Elementary and Waiākea Intermediate. The school is also located directly across from the University of Hawaiʻi at Hilo.

== History ==
In 1976, the school opened; It was originally constructed due to overcrowding at Hilo High School. The school's name, Waiākea, meaning broad waters, was chosen due to the area the campus was located in, while its mascot and colors were chosen by the first freshman class in a poll. Although it was founded in 1976, the campus itself was not built until the following year; When the campus first opened in 1977, it originally had only two classrooms and two portable buildings along with 17 teachers and 385 sophomore students; The first graduating class was in 1980.

When the school was first opened, it originally enrolled students from the neighboring Puna District. As Puna's population rapidly grew throughout the 1990s, the school eventually became the largest on the island and overcrowded. In 1998, Keaʻau High School was opened to relieve the burden of students, and cut the enrollment in nearly half.

In 2002, a fire started overnight in building R, causing an estimated $400,000 in damage. The building was restored and reopened in 2005. In 2006, a separate fire broke out in building A (the administration building), purportedly started by an arsonist, resulting in a purported $1.5 million in damage.

Track facility

In 2012, funds were released to construct a new all weather track and football field, which would replace the previous dirt running track. Phase one was completed in 2014 and resulted in the track opening for the soccer season. Phase two was completed in 2016, which marked the final part of construction. This phase resulted in new training facilities, bleachers, and a concession stand building with restrooms. The facility was named the Ken Yamase Memorial Stadium, after former athletic director Ken Yamase who passed away.

In October 2026, the school celebrated its semicentennial anniversary.

== School structure ==
Enrollment and demographics

As of the 2024-2025 school year, the school has 1,183 students with 77.00 classroom teachers (on a full-time equivalent basis). Of the student population, for ethnicity, 308 are Native Hawaiian/Pacific Islander, 283 are Hispanic, 243 are two or more races, 241 are Asian, 102 are White, and 1 is American Indian/Alaska Native. For gender, 621 are female and 562 are male. For free or reduced-price lunch, 480 are eligable.

== Academics ==
The school offers a variety of dual credit options, including Advanced Placement (AP), Early College and Running Start.

The school also utilizes a Smaller Learning Community (SLC) system of "wall-to-wall" academies, in order to provide personalized experiences for students.There are five academies: a freshman house and four career academies that focus on Career and Technical Education pathways in arts and communication, industrial technology, health services, and public services. Each academy is certified model by the National Career Academy Coalition (NCAC) and require most students to do a senior project.

=== Graduation requirements ===
Per the Board of Education, the school requires four credits in English and social studies, and three credits in science and mathematics. For electives, students are required to take 2 credits in either fine arts, world language, or Career and Technical Education, one credit in physical education, half a credit in health, and half a credit in Transition to High School.

For dual credit options, Waiākea High School offers advanced placement and Early College classes for 10th-12th graders, along with Running Start classes for 11th-12th graders at the University of Hawaii at Hilo and the Hawaii Community College, which are part of the University of Hawaii system.As of 2024, the school offers 10 Advanced Placement classes. These include AP English, AP Literature, AP World History, AP Calculus, AP Biology, AP Chemistry, AP Environmental Science, AP Seminar and AP Research. As of the 2023-2024 school year, the school had a participation rate of 26% for AP classes, with 18% passing the AP exam.

== Extracurricular activities ==
The school offers a range of clubs that include Key Club, Leo Club, and Interact Club. Curriculum related clubs include National Honor Society, DECA, and robotics through the Technology Learning Center. Special interest clubs include a gender–sexuality alliance, color guard, and Fellowship of Christian Athletes.

=== Athletics ===
Waiākea is a member of the Big Island Interscholastic Federation (BIIF). Sports offered include air riflery, boys' baseball, basketball, bowling, canoe paddling, cross country, girls' flag football, boys' football, golf, judo, soccer, girls' softball, swimming, tennis, track and field, volleyball, girls' water polo, and wrestling.

The school has won Hawaii High School Athletic Association (HHSAA) state athletic championships in several sports, including 14 in boys golf, 3 in boys air riflery, 2 in baseball, 2 in girls' basketball, 2 in swimming and diving, 1 in boys bowling, and 1 in girls air riflery.

=== Technology Learning Center ===
As part of the Hawaii Department of Education's Learning Centers program, the school offers a Technology Learning Center (TLC), which offers an Electronic Technical Center and an Electric Vehicle program. Through the Electronic Technical Center, students are provided with opportunities to participate in FIRST Robotics. The center has won competitions for FIRST in 2008, 2009, and 2011. The goal of the program is to provide students with college-readiness and STEM skills. Students who participate can earn a half credit.

== Campus ==
The campus is located at 155 Kawili Street on 43 acres of land adjacent to feeding schools Waiākea Elementary and Waiākea Intermediate. It is also located directly across from the University of Hawaiʻi at Hilo.

Notable features include one of the few full auto shops for a high school in the state and a botanical garden spanning four acres.

== Awards and recognition ==
The school was a recipient of the Hawaii Frito Lay Blue Ribbon award in 1989 and 1996. Additionally, it has received Academy Model accreditation status for all of its academies by the NCAC.

In 2019, the student council won a Decade of Excellence award from the National Association of Student Councils. It also won National Council of Excellence Awards between 2020 and 2025.

== Notable alumni ==
- Kai Correa – Major League Baseball coach for the San Francisco Giants
- Ryan Higa – YouTube personality
- Greggor Ilagan – member of the Hawaii House of Representatives since 2020
- Billy Kenoi – former Mayor of Hawaii County 2008-2016
- Darren Kimura – businessman
- Onan Masaoka – former professional baseball player for the Los Angeles Dodgers
- Kodi Medeiros – professional baseball player
- Kala'i Rosario – baseball player in the Minnesota Twins organization
- Brad Tavares – professional Mixed Martial Artist (who competes for UFC)
- Quintin Torres-Costa – professional baseball player
- Kean Wong – MLB player for the Los Angeles Angels

== Former principals ==
Waiākea High School has had a number of school principals over its history. They are as follows in chronological order: Robert Bean, John Sosa, Danford Sakai, Michael Tokioka, Patricia Nekoba, and Kelcy Koga.

The current principal, Kelcy Koga, returned to Waiākea High School after the retirement of Patricia Nekoba, who left in December 2006. As of the 2024-2025 school year, he is still principal.
