= Big Island Interscholastic Federation =

High school athletic association for the Island of Hawai'i

Big Island Interscholastic Federation

The Big Island Interscholastic Federation or BIIF Consists of 21 high schools that sponsor a number of athletic sports, including football, basketball, volleyball and soccer. All schools are located on the Island of Hawaiʻi, which is governed by the County of Hawaiʻi.

== Member institutions ==
=== Current members ===
Institution	Location	Founded	Mascot	School Colors
Christian Liberty Academy	Keaʻau	1985	Canefire	Navy Blue & Orange
Connections Public Charter	Hilo	2000	N/A	N/A
Ke Kula O Ehunuikaimalino	Kealakekua	2002	Na Io	Red & Brown
Hawaii Academy of Arts and Sciences	Pahoa	2001	Na Naia	Silver & Blue
Hawaii Preparatory Academy	Waimea	1949	Ka Makani	Red & White
Hilo High School	Hilo	1907	Vikings	Blue & Gold
Honokaa High School	Honokaʻa	1889	Dragons	Green & Gold
Kamehameha Schools	Keaʻau	2001	Warriors	Blue & White
Kanu ʻO Ka ʻAina New Century	Waimea	2000	N/A	Red & Yellow
Kaʻu High School	Pahala	1881	Trojans	Maroon & White
Ka Umeke Public School	Hilo		N/A	N/A
Keaau High School	Keaʻau	1999	Cougars	Navy and Red
Kealakehe High School	Kailua-Kona	1997	Waveriders	Blue, Silver & White
Ke Ana Laʻahana Charter	Hilo	2001	N/A	N/A
Kohala High School	Kapaʻau	1926	Cowboys	Black & Gold
Konawaena High School	Kealakekua	1925	Wildcats	Green & White
Kua ʻO Ka La Charter	Kapoho		N/A	N/A
Laupahoehoe High School	Laupahoehoe	1883	Seasiders	Royal Blue & Gold
Makua Lani Christian Academy	Kailua-Kona	1992	Lions	Purple & White
Pahoa High School	Pahoa	1943	Daggers	Green & White
Parker School	Waimea	1976	Bulls	Maroon, Black & White
St. Joseph High School	Hilo	1869	Cardinals	Red & Gold
Waiakea High School	Hilo	1976	Warriors	Royal Blue & White
West Hawaii Explorations Academy	Kailua-Kona	1994	N/A	Silver & Green

=== Former members ===
Institution	Location	Founded	Mascot	School Colors
Hualalai Academy	Kailua-Kona	1998	Pueo	Turquoise/white
Waters of Life New Century	Pahoa	2000	Waters	Aqua & Ultramarine Blue

== Championships ==
=== Baseball ===
Year	Champions
1981	Hilo
1982	Waiakea
1983	Hilo
1984	Waiakea
1985	**Hilo**
1996	Waiakea
1997	Hilo
1998	Waiakea
1999	Waiakea
2000	Waiakea
2001	Waiakea
2002	Hilo
2003	Waiakea
2004	Waiakea
2005	Waiakea
2006	Kamehameha-Hawaii
2007	Waiakea

Year	Division-I	Division-II
2008	Waiakea	Honoka'a
2009	Hilo	Hawaii Prep
2010	Hilo	Kamehameha-Hawaii
2011	Waiakea	Konawaena
2012	**Waiakea**	Kamehameha-Hawaii
2013	Hilo	Kamehameha-Hawaii
2014	Waiakea	Kamehameha-Hawaii
2015	Hilo	Kamehameha-Hawaii
2016	Waiakea	**Kamehameha-Hawaii**
2017	Hilo	Kamehameha-Hawaii
2018	Waiakea	Kamehameha-Hawaii
2019	Hilo	Kamehameha-Hawaii
2022	**Waiakea**	Kamehameha-Hawaii
2023	Waiakea	Kamehameha-Hawaii
2024	Hilo	**Kamehameha-Hawaii**
2025	Waiakea	Pahoa

bold denotes HHSAA tournament champions

=== Cross Country ===
Year	Boys	Girls
2009	Honoka'a	Hawaii Prep
2010	Honoka'a	Hawaii Prep
2011	Honoka'a	Hawaii Prep
2012	Honoka'a	Hawaii Prep
2013	Honoka'a	Hawaii Prep
2014	Kealakehe	Hawaii Prep
2015	Waiakea	Hawaii Prep
2016	Waiakea	Hawaii Prep
2017	Waiakea	Hilo

bold denotes HHSAA tournament champions

=== Track and Field ===
Year	Boys	Girls
1955	Hilo	
1956	Hilo	
1957	Hilo	
1958	Hilo	
1959	Hilo	
1960	Hilo	
1961	Hilo	
1962	Hilo	
1963	Hilo	
1964	Hilo	
1965	Hilo	
1966	Hilo	
1967	Hilo	
1968	Hilo	
1969	Hilo	
1970	Hilo	
1971	Hilo	
1972	Hilo	Hilo
1973	Hilo	Hawaii Prep
1974		
1975	Hilo	Hawaii Prep
1976	Hilo, Hawaii Prep	Hawaii Prep
1977	Hawaii Prep	Hawaii Prep
1978		
1979		
1980	Hawaii Prep	Hawaii Prep
1981	Hawaii Prep	Hawaii Prep
1982		
1983		
1984		
1985	Konawaena	Hawaii Prep
1986		
1987		
1988		
1989		
1990		
1991		
1992		
1993	Hawaii Prep	**Hilo**
1994	Hawaii Prep	Hilo
1995	Hawaii Prep	**Hawaii Prep**
1996		Hawaii Prep
1997	Waiakea	Hawaii Prep
1998	Hilo	Hawaii Prep
1999	Hilo	Hilo
2000	Hilo	Hilo
2001	Hilo	Hawaii Prep
2002	Hilo	Hilo
2003	Hilo	Hilo
2004	Hilo	Hawaii Prep
2005	Hawaii Prep	Hawaii Prep
2007	Hawaii Prep	Hilo
2008	Hilo	Hawaii Prep
2009	Hilo	KS-Hawai'i
2010	KS-Hawai'i	Hawaii Prep
2011	Waiakea	Hawaii Prep
2012	Kea'au	Konawaena
2013	Kea'au	Hilo
2014	KS-Hawai'i	Hilo
2015	Waiakea	Hawaii Prep
2016	Waiakea	**Hawaii Prep**
2017	Konawaena	KS-Hawai'i
2018	Kealakehe	KS-Hawaii
2019	Waiakea	Kealakehe
2020		
2021		
2022		
2023	Waiakea	Hawaii Prep
2024	Konawaena	Hilo
2025	Konawaena	**Konawaena**

bold denotes HHSAA tournament champions

=== Football ===
Year	Champions
1956	Hilo
1957	Honoka'a
1958	Hilo
1959	Hilo
1960	Kohala, Honoka'a (co-champions)
1961	Hawaii Prep
1962	Kau (7-0)
1963	Hawaii Prep
1964	Hawaii Prep
1965	Hawaii Prep
1966	Hawaii Prep
1967	Hilo
1968	Hilo
1969	Hilo
1970	Konawaena
1971	Hilo
1972	Hilo
1973	Honoka'a
1974	Honoka'a
1975	Hilo
1976	Hilo
1977	Hilo
1978	Konawaena
1979	Hilo
1980	Konawaena
1981	Konawaena
1982	Konawaena
1983	Konawaena
1984	Konawaena
1985	Konawaena
1986	Konawaena
1987	Konawaena
1988	Konawaena
1989	Konawaena
1990	Konawaena
1991	Hilo
1992	Konawaena
1993	Hawaii Prep
1994	Waiakea
1995	Waiakea
1996	Waiakea
1997	Waiakea
1998	Konawaena
1999	Konawaena
2000	Hilo (8-1)
2001	Waiakea
2002	Hawaii Prep (7-2)

Year	Division-I	Division-II
2003	Hilo (7-2)	Hawaii Prep
2004	Kealakehe (6-3)	Hawaii Prep (9-0)
2005	Kealakehe (7-1)	Kamehameha-Hawaii (7-2)
2006	Kealakehe (9-0)	Kamehameha-Hawaii (7-2)
2007	Kealakehe (8-2)	Kamehameha-Hawaii (7-2)
2008	Kealakehe (9-3)	Konawaena (7-2)
2009	Honoka'a (7-1)	Hawaii Prep (8-0)
2010	Kealakehe (6-0)	Kamehameha-Hawaii (10-0)
2011	Kealakehe (6-0)	Konawaena (9-1)
2012	Kealakehe (6-0)	Konawaena (10-0)
2013	Hilo (9-0)	Konawaena (8-1)
2014	Hilo (9-0)	Kamehameha-Hawaii (7-2)
2015	Hilo (7-2)	Konawaena (8-1)
2016	Hilo (8-0)	Konawaena (7-1)
2017	Hilo (7-1)	Konawaena (8-0)
2018	Hilo (9-2)	Kamehameha-Hawaii (6-3)
2019	Hilo (14-0)	Kamehameha-Hawaii (10-4)
2020	COVID	COVID
2021	Konawaena (6-1)	Kamehameha-Hawaii (5-3)
2022	Konawaena (11-1)	Honokaa (10-2)
2023	Konawaena (11-2)	Kamehameha-Hawaii (11-2)
2024	Konawaena (10-3)	Kamehameha-Hawaii (11-2)

YEAR	STATE CHAMPIONS	SCORE	COACH
2017	HILO HIGH SCHOOL	HILO 35, DAMIEN 19	KAEO DRUMMUNDO
2019	HILO HIGH SCHOOL	HILO 20, IOLANI 17	KAEO DRUMMUNDO
2022	KONAWAENA HIGH SCHOOL	KONAWAENA 38, WAIPAHU 28	BRAD UEMOTO

=== Judo ===
Year	Boys	Girls
2002	Waiākea	
2003	Waiākea	
2004	Hilo	
2005	Waiākea	
2006	Waiākea	
2007	Waiākea	Waiākea
2008	Waiakea	
2009	Hilo	Kamehameha
2010	Hilo	Kamehameha
2011	Waiākea	Kamehameha
2012	Waiākea	Kamehameha
2013	Waiākea	Kamehameha
2014	Waiākea	Hilo
2015	Waiākea	Keaʻau
2016	Hilo	Waiākea
2017	Waiākea	Waiākea
2018	Waiākea	Waiākea
2019	Waiākea	Hilo
2020	n/a	n/a
2021	n/a	n/a
2022	Waiākea	Hilo
2023	Hilo	Waiākea

=== Boys Soccer ===
Year	Division-I	Division-II
2008	Kealakehe	Honoka'a
2009	Kealakehe	Hawaii Prep
2010	Kealakehe	Honoka'a
2011	Hilo	**Honoka'a**
2012	Kealakehe	**Honoka'a**
2013	Kealakehe	Konawaena
2014	Kealakehe	Hawaii Prep
2015	Kealakehe	Kamehameha-Hawaii
2016	Kealakehe	**Hawaii Prep**
2017	Kealakehe	**Hawaii Prep**
2018	**Hawaii Prep**	**Kamehameha-Hawaii**
2019	Hawaii Prep	Kamehameha-Hawaii
2020	Hilo	**Hawaii Prep**
2022	Hilo	Hawaii Prep
2023	Waiakea	**Kamehameha-Hawaii**
2024	Kealakehe	Kamehameha-Hawaii
2025	Hilo	**Kamehameha-Hawaii**

bold denotes HHSAA tournament champions

=== Girls Soccer ===
Year	Division-I	Division-II
2008	Konawaena	**Kamehameha-Hawaii**
2009	Hilo	Kamehameha-Hawaii
2010	Hilo	Hawaii-Prep
2011	Hilo	Hawaii-Prep
2012	Kealakehe	Hawaii-Prep
2013	Konawaena	Hawaii-Prep
2014	Konawaena	**Hawaii Prep**
2015	Konawaena	**Hawaii Prep**
2016	Hilo	**Hawaii Prep**
2017	Hilo	**Hawaii Prep**
2018	Hilo	**Hawaii Prep**
2019	Hilo	**Hawaii Prep**
2020	Konawaena	**Hawaii Prep**
2022	Waiakea	Kamehameha-Hawaii
2023	Waiakea	Kamehameha-Hawaii
2024	Hilo	Kamehameha-Hawaii
2025	Waiakea	**Kamehameha-Hawaii**

bold denotes HHSAA tournament champions

=== Wrestling ===
Year	Boys	Girls
2010	**Kealakehe**	**Kamehameha**
2011	**Waiakea**	**Kamehameha**
2012	**Waiakea**	**Kamehameha**
2013	**Waiakea**	**Kamehameha**
2014	**Waiakea**	**Kamehameha**

=== Boys Volleyball ===
Year	Champions
1969	**Hilo**
1991	Laupahoehoe
2001	Kealakehe
2002	Kealakehe
2003	Kealakehe
2004	Waiakea

Year	D-I	D-II
2005	Kamehameha-Hawaii	Hilo
2006	Kamehameha-Hawaii	Hilo
2008	Kamehameha-Hawaii	Hilo
2009	Waiakea	Hilo
2010	Kamehameha-Hawaii	Pahoa
2011	Waiakea	Kohala
2012	Kamehameha-Hawaii	Hawaii Prep
2013	Waiakea	Pahoa
2014	Kamehameha-Hawaii	Kau
2015	Kamehameha-Hawaii	Hawaii Prep
2016	Kamehameha-Hawaii	Hawaii Prep
2017	Kamehameha-Hawaii	Hawaii Prep
2018	Kealakehe	Hawaii Prep
2019	Kamehameha-Hawaii	Hawaii Prep
2022	Kamehameha-Hawaii	Konawaena
2023	Kamehameha-Hawaii	Konawaena
2024	Hilo	Konawaena
2025	Hilo	Hawaii Prep

bold denotes HHSAA tournament champions

=== Girls Volleyball ===
Year	Champions
1972	**Hilo**
1974	**Hilo**
2001	Hilo
2002	St. Joseph
2003	St. Joseph
2004	Waiakea
2005	Kamehameha-Hawaii

Year	Division-I	Division-II
2006	Kamehameha-Hawaii	Hawaii Prep
2007	Kamehameha-Hawaii	Hilo
2008	Waiakea	Hilo
2009	Waiakea	Hilo
2010	Kamehameha-Hawaii	Hawaii Prep
2011	Kamehameha-Hawaii	Hawaii Prep
2012	Kamehameha-Hawaii	Kau
2013	Kamehameha-Hawaii	Hawaii Prep
2014	Kamehameha-Hawaii	**Konawaena**
2015	Waiakea	Konawaena
2016	Hilo	Konawaena
2017	Waiakea	Konawaena
2018	Hilo	Kohala
2019	Kamehameha-Hawaii	Konawaena
2021	Kamehameha-Hawaii	Hawaii Prep
2022	Kamehameha-Hawaii	Konawaena
2023	Kamehameha-Hawaii	Hawaii Prep
2024	Kamehameha-Hawaii	Hawaii Prep

bold denotes HHSAA tournament champions

=== Boys Basketball ===
Year	Champions
1945	Hilo
1946	Hilo
1947	Hilo
1948	Pahoa*
1949	Pahoa*
1950	Pahoa
1951	Hilo
1952	Kohala
1953	Kohala
1954	Hilo, Honoka'a
1955	Hilo
1956	Hilo
1957	Hilo
1958	**St. Joseph**
1959	Hilo
1960	Laupahoehoe
1961	Hilo
1962	Hilo
1963	Hilo
1964	**Hilo**
1965	St. Joseph
1966	Hilo
1967	Hilo
1968	Hilo
1969	Hilo
1970	Hilo
1971	Hilo
1972	Hilo
1973	Hilo
1974	St. Joseph
1975	Hilo
1976	Hilo
1977	Hilo
1978	Hilo
1979	Kohala
1980	Hilo
1981	Hilo
1982	Waiakea
1983	Kohala
1984	Kohala
1985	Hilo
1986	Hilo
1987	Waiakea
1988	Honoka'a
1989	Honoka'a
1990	Hilo
1991	**Hilo**
1991	Hilo
1992	Hilo
1993	Hilo
1994	Hilo
1995	Hilo
1996	Hilo
1997	Hilo
1998	Waiakea
1999	Waiakea
2000	**Hilo**
2001	Honoka'a
2002	Waiakea
2003	Kea'au
2004	Kealakehe
2005	Konawaena
2006	Kamehameha-Hawai'i

Year	Division-I	Division-II
2007	Kamehameha-Hawai'i	Kohala
2008	Konawaena	Kohala
2009	Waiakea	Kohala
2010	Hilo	St. Joseph
2011	Kamehameha-Hawai'i	Pahoa
2012	Kamehameha-Hawai'i	Hawaii Preparatory Academy
2013	Konawaena	Hawaii Preparatory Academy
2014	Konawaena	Kohala
2015	Konawaena	Pahoa
2016	Waiakea	St. Joseph
2017	Waiakea	Honoka'a
2018	Kamehameha-Hawai'i	Hawaii Preparatory Academy
2019	Waiakea	Hawaii Preparatory Academy
2020	Kamehameha-Hawai'i	Hawaii Preparatory Academy
2022	Hilo	Kohala
2023	Kamehameha-Hawai'i	**Kohala**
2024	Kamehameha-Hawai'i	**Kohala**
2025	Kamehameha-Hawai'i	Kohala

bold denotes HHSAA tournament champions
* - While winning four consecutive Territorial titles from 1946 to 1949, Hilo did not participate in the BIIF circuit between 1947 and 1949
