= Hawaii High School Athletic Association =

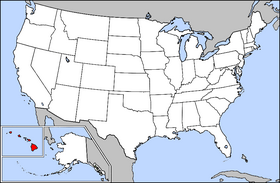
- Abbreviation: HHSAA
- Formation: 1956
- Type: Volunteer
- Legal status: Association
- Purpose: Athletic/Educational
- Headquarters: 2705 Kaimuki Avenue; Honolulu, HI 96816
- Region served: Hawaii
- Members: 95 high schools
- Executive Director: Christopher Chun
- Affiliations: National Federation of State High School Associations
- Staff: 3
- Volunteers: 100+
- Website: sportshigh.com
- Remarks: (808) 800-4092

Hawaii High School Athletic Association (HHSAA) is an athletic conference made up of 95 public and private high schools in the U.S. state of Hawaii. It was founded in 1956 and is a member of the National Federation of State High School Associations.

The HHSAA comprises schools from five leagues:

- Big Island Interscholastic Federation
- Interscholastic League of Honolulu
- Kauai Interscholastic Federation
- Maui Interscholastic League
- Oahu Interscholastic Association

The HHSAA conducts state high school championships in the following sports: boys and girls air riflery, baseball, boys and girls basketball, boys and girls bowling, boys and girls and coed canoe paddling, cheerleading, boys and girls cross country, coed esports, girls flag football, coed football, boys and girls golf, boys and girls judo, boys and girls soccer, softball, boys and girls swimming and diving, boys and girls tennis, boys and girls track and field, boys and girls volleyball, girls water polo, and boys and girls wrestling.

In 2024, the Hawaii Department of Education announced that girls' flag football would be added to the list of supported sports. This was done after an informal survey determined that it was among the top three of wanted sports by student athletes. It was the first sport to be added to the list in 20 years (with the exception of e-sports, which was sanctioned in 2019), and makes Hawaii the 12th state in the nation to sanction it at the high school level. The program is being supported by the NFL (National Football League), Seattle Seahawks, Nike, and Marcus Mariota's Motiv8 foundation.

== See also ==
- HHSAA State Football Championships/Oahu Prep Bowl
- NFHS
