= ʻAiea High School =

Coordinates: 21.3848°N 157.9301°W

Location
- 98-1276 Ulune Street ʻAiea, Hawaiʻi 96701; United States

Information
- Type: Public
- Motto: "Home of the Na Aliʻi"
- Established: 1961
- School district: Central District
- Principal: David Tanuvasa
- Faculty: 66.00 FTE
- Grades: 9-12
- Enrollment: 995 (2022-23)
- Student to teacher ratio: 15.08
- Campus: Suburban
- Colors: Green and White
- Athletics: Oahu Interscholastic Association
- Mascot: Na Aliʻi
- Rival: Pearl City High School (Hawaii); Admiral Arthur W. Radford High School
- Accreditation: Western Association of Schools and Colleges
- Yearbook: Hanu i Loko o Ka Lewa
- Website: 'Aiea High School

ʻAiea High School is a public high school of the Hawaiʻi State Department of Education and serves grades nine through twelve. Established in 1961, ʻAiea High School is located in the ʻAiea CDP, in the City and County of Honolulu of the state of Hawaiʻi. It is situated on a former sugar cane plantation overlooking Pearl Harbor at 98-1276 Ulune St. The campus boasts the sculpture Early Spring by Satoru Abe.

ʻAiea High School's student body is made up of largely of persons of Asian or Pacific Islander descent.

== Academics ==
Per the Board of Education, the school requires a total of 24 credits to graduate. Per the Board of Education, the school requires six credits in electives, four credits in English, four credits in social studies, three credits in mathematics, three credits in science, two credits in either world language, fine arts, or Career Technical Education, one credit in physical education, half a credit in health, and half a credit for the Personal Transition Plan (PTP), for a total of 24 credits.

For dual-credit, the school offers AP (Advanced Placement) classes and Early College. The AP classes offered are AP Computer Science Principles, AP Seminar, and AP Research. The school offers Early College through the Leeward Community College, which is a part of the University of Hawaii system.

The school uses career academies to provide individualized instruction to students. These are the Academy of Aspiring Professionals and the Academy of Innovation. Each academy has career pathways and lasts for four years. Students in academies get core courses based around their academy.

== Notable alumni ==
Listed alphabetically by last name:

- Brandon Elefante, Hawaii state senator
- Kelly Kawachi (born 1988), Class of 2006, Michelin Award winner Hawaii native Kelly Kawachi of Blackbelly wins 2023 Culinary Professional Award
- Vincent Klyn (born 1960), New Zealand-born actor and former professional surfer
- Joe Moore, American newscaster and actor
- Maria Quiban (born 1970), American newscaster
- Garret T. Sato (1964–2020), actor
- Derek Tatsuno (born 1958), college baseball player and former pitcher for the University of Hawaiʻi
- Tuufuli Uperesa (1948–2021), American football player

== Complex schools ==
- Aiea Intermediate
- Aiea Elementary
- Pearl Ridge Elementary
- Scott Elementary
- Waimalu Elementary
- Webling Elementary
