= Konawaena High School =

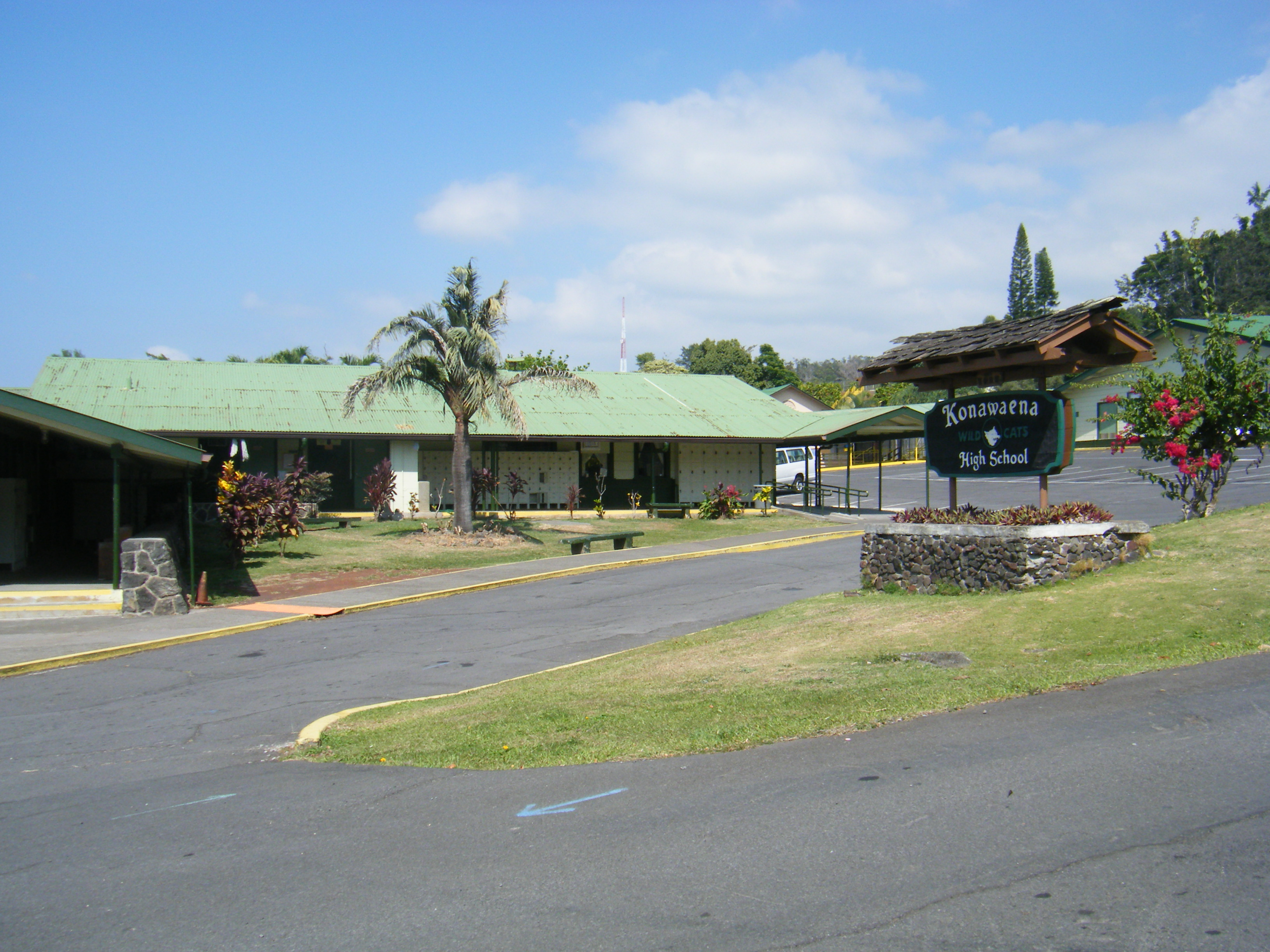

Location
- 81-1043 Konawaena School Road; Kealakekua, Hawaii 96750; United States; 19°30′34″N 155°54′54″W

Information
- Type: Public
- Motto: Achievement, character and success for life
- Established: 1921
- Principal: Ami Akeo
- Teaching staff: 53.00 (FTE)
- Grades: 9–12
- Student to teacher ratio: 18.02
- Campus: Rural
- Campus type: Outdoor
- Color: Green White
- Athletics conference: Big Island Interscholastic Federation
- Affiliation: State of Hawaii
- Mascot: Wildcat
- Website: www.konawaenahs.org

Konawaena High School is a public school located in Kona District, Hawaii County, Hawaii, United States. Konawaena means "the center of the leeward side" in the Hawaiian Language.

The school has a Kealakekua mailing address, and it, along with Konawaena Middle School, is on a campus partially in the Kealakekua census-designated place (CDP) and partially in the Captain Cook CDP.

== History ==
In 1921, a grammar school in Kona established its first 9th grade class. The school continued to establish 10th, 11th, and 12th grade classes as the years went on. The first graduating class was the Class of 1925. It was originally the only high school in the Kona District until Kealakehe High School was built in 1997, and serves rural South Kona.

The campus originally consisted of the original buildings built in the 1910s and 1920s, many of which were replaced in the 1960s by the newer two-story C, D, E, G, F, R, and S Buildings. In the early 1950s, the administration and library buildings were added. In the mid 1950s, the upper campus was built along with a new cafeteria (A building). The upper campus was used as the elementary school, until the new elementary school opened down the street in 1999. In 1958, the shop buildings were added. In the 1960s, the newer two-story four wing C, D, E, G and F buildings replaced the old three wing building. Around the same time, the school added bleachers to Julian Yates field along with the R and S buildings replacing old ones, and the new state of the art Ellison Onizuka Gymnasium opened (N building) in the early 1970s. Not long after, a new locker room and band room were built right above Julian Yates field (Q Building). The only two original buildings remaining on the campus today are the Ag building and one on the upper campus, now Konawaena Middle School.

Throughout the first 40 years, Konawaena operated on what is known as the "coffee schedule," where summer vacation was shifted to September through November to allow children to help with harvesting coffee cherries. The coffee schedule made it impossible for Kona to field a football team because potential players were picking coffee. Child labor laws contributed to the demise of the coffee schedule, which was ended in 1966.

Today Konawaena has successfully grown to encompass a middle school and an elementary school Kealakekua. As of 2017, the total school population is around 825 students. In 1995 it held the most students in the whole state, a total of 3,900 in the high school alone. Altogether, that same year there were about 5,000 on the campus grades K-12. The current principal is Ami Akeo, who assumed the role when former band teacher and vice-principal, Shawn Suzuki, retired in 2021. Suzuki replaced Dr. James Dumaguin who died in 2005.

== Notable alumni ==
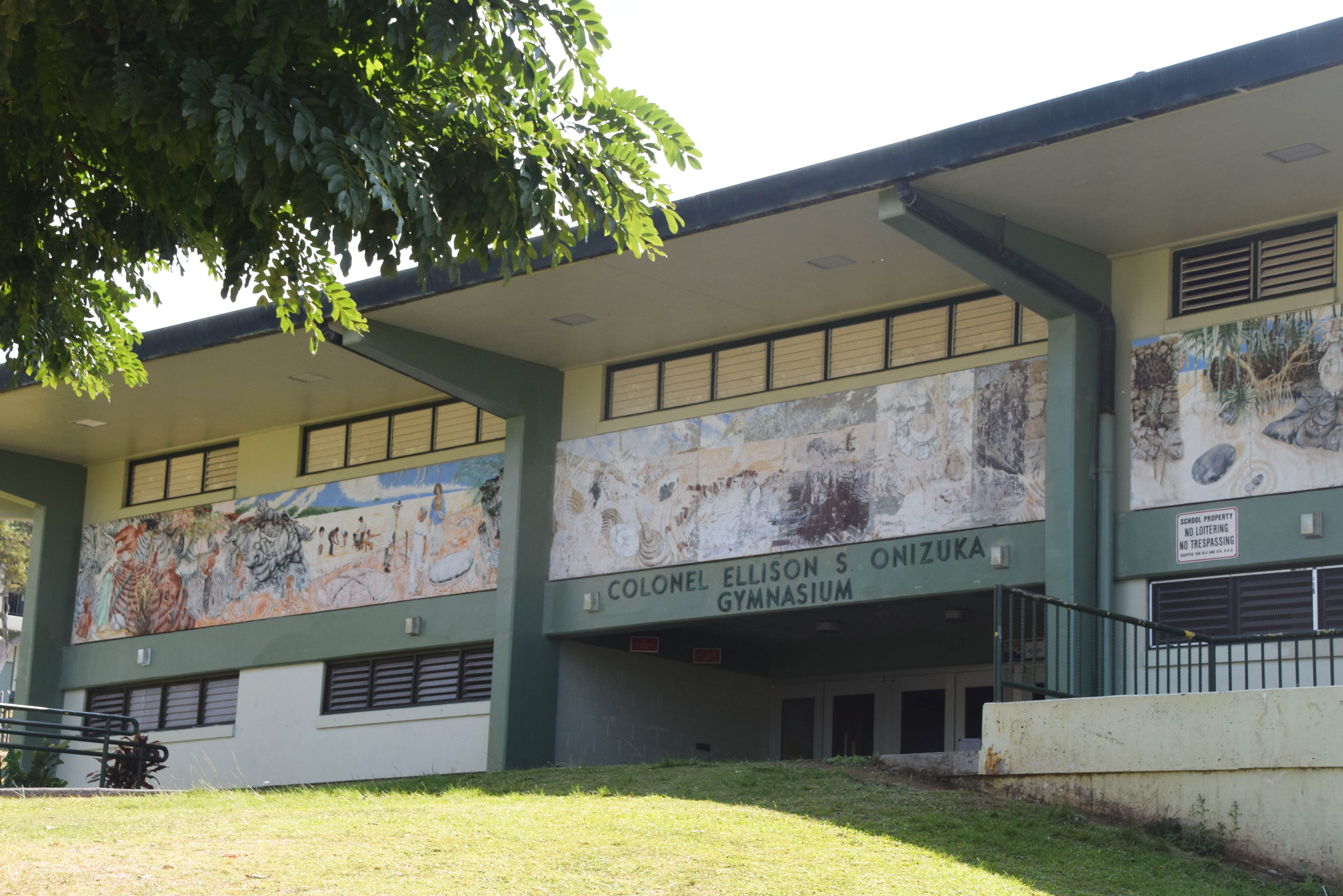
Ellison Onizuka Gymnasium

Listed alphabetically by last name:

- Brian "Crush" Adams, professional wrestler
- Koji Ariyoshi, activist, publisher
- Patrick Shane Dorian, professional surfer
- Ellison Shoji Onizuka, NASA astronaut
- Pepper, reggae rock band

== Solar Challenge ==
In 1990, the Konawaena solar car team was the first high school team to complete the World Solar Challenge, crossing the finish line just 15 minutes before the final gun. The 1996 movie Race the Sun, starring Halle Berry, Casey Affleck, and James Belushi was loosely based on this story. Bill Woerner, the real-life teacher who led the team, later founded the charter school West Hawaii Explorations Academy.

== In the media ==
Konawaena was the setting for the 1998 independent film Beyond Paradise.
