= Tuufuli Uperesa =

American Samoan gridiron football player (1948–2021)

No. 75, 62, 61, 66
- Position: Offensive guard

Personal information
- Born: January 20, 1948; American Samoa
- Died: June 21, 2021 (aged 73); American Samoa
- Listed height: 6 ft 3 in (1.91 m)
- Listed weight: 254 lb (115 kg)

Career information
- High school: ʻAiea (Aiea, Hawaii, U.S.)
- College: Montana
- NFL draft: 1970: 16th round, 396th overall pick

Career history
- Calgary Stampeders (1970)*; Philadelphia Eagles (1970–1971); → Pottstown Firebirds (1970); Winnipeg Blue Bombers (1972–1974); Calgary Stampeders (1975); Ottawa Rough Riders (1975–1976); BC Lions (1977)
- * Offseason or practice squad member only

Awards and highlights
- Grey Cup champion (1976); Second-team Little All-American (1969)

Career NFL statistics
- Games played: 2
- Stats at Pro Football Reference

Tuufuli Uperesa (January 20, 1948 – June 21, 2021) was an American Samoan professional football offensive guard who played in the National Football League (NFL) and Canadian Football League (CFL). He was selected by the Philadelphia Eagles in the sixteenth round of the 1970 NFL draft after playing college football at the University of Montana.

== Early life and college ==
Tuufuli Uperesa was born on January 20, 1948, in American Samoa. He moved to Hawaii at a young age, and later attended ʻAiea High School in Aiea, Hawaii. He participated in football, basketball, baseball, and track in high school.

Uperesa first played college football at Wenatchee Valley College. He then transferred to play for the Montana Grizzlies of the University of Montana, and was a two-year letterman from 1968 to 1969. He earned second-team Little All-American honors in 1969 and was a team captain.

== Professional career ==
Uperesa was selected by the Philadelphia Eagles in the 16th round, with the 396th overall pick, of the 1970 NFL draft. However, he instead signed with the Calgary Stampeders of the Canadian Football League (CFL) on May 22, 1970. On July 23, it was reported that he had been released. On July 30, Uperesa signed with the Eagles. He was released on September 2, 1970, but signed to the team's taxi squad later in September. He was then a member of the Eagles' farm team, the Pottstown Firebirds of the Atlantic Coast Football League during the 1970 season. Uperesa was released by the Eagles in September 1971, signed to the taxi squad, and then promoted to the active roster before the start of the season. He played in two games for the Eagles that year before being waived on September 30, 1971.

Uperesa signed with the Winnipeg Blue Bombers of the CFL on March 24, 1972. He was released on July 31, 1972. He signed with the Blue Bombers again in April 1973. On September 20, Uperesa was "remanded without plea on a charge of assault causing bodily harm" due to an incident on September 14 in Winnipeg where he had an argument with a cyclist. Uperesa dressed in all 16 games for the Blue Bombers during the 1973 season. In March 1974, he was selected by the Detroit Wheels of the World Football League (WFL) in the 1974 WFL pro draft but decided to stay with the Blue Bombers. He dressed in all 16 games for the second straight season for Winnipeg in 1974. He re-signed with the Blue Bombers on April 8, 1975.

In July 1975, Uperesa was traded to the Calgary Stampeders for Ron Southwick. Uperesa dressed in eight games for the Stampeders during the 1975 season. On September 16, it was reported that he had been released so the Stampeders could sign Dave Means.

Uperesa then signed with the CFL's Ottawa Rough Riders and dressed in four games for them that year. He dressed in 11 games for the Rough Riders in 1976. On November 28, 1976, Ottawa beat the Saskatchewan Roughriders by a score of 23–20 to win the 64th Grey Cup.

Uperesa was signed by the BC Lions of the CFL in May 1977. He dressed in two games for the Lions before retiring in August 1977.

== Personal life ==
After his football career, Uperesa returned to the University of Montana to finish his degree in health and physical education. He then worked as a teacher and counselor at both the community college and high school level in Pago Pago, American Samoa before retiring in 1997.

Uperesa later suffered from arthritis and had both of his knees replaced. He died of kidney failure on June 21, 2021, in American Samoa at age 73.
