= Nānākuli, Hawaii =

Census-designated place in Hawaii, United States

Nānākuli
- Census-designated place
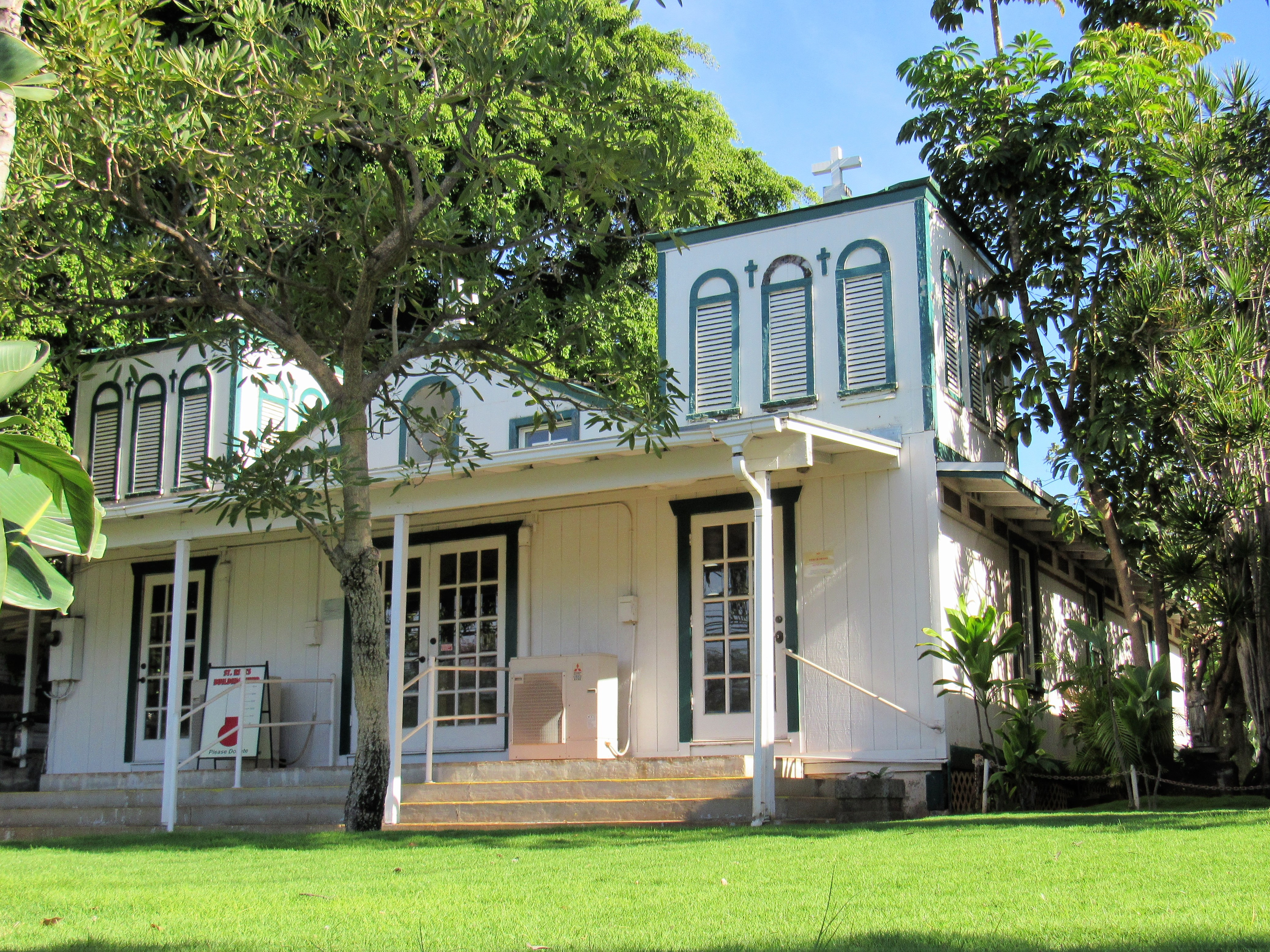
- St. Rita Catholic Church in Nānākuli

- Location in Honolulu County and the state of Hawaii
- Coordinates: 21°23′36″N 158°9′10″W
- Country: United States
- State: Hawaii

Area
  - Total: 6.57 sq mi (17.01 km^{2})
  - Land: 2.99 sq mi (7.74 km^{2})
  - Water: 3.58 sq mi (9.26 km^{2})
- Elevation: 9.8 ft (3 m)

Population (2020)
  - Total: 12,195
  - Density: 4,079.9/sq mi (1,575.27/km^{2})
- Time zone: UTC-10 (Hawaii-Aleutian)
- ZIP code: 96792
- Area code: 808
- FIPS code: 15-53900
- GNIS feature ID: 0362575

Nānākuli (Hawaiian pronunciation: [naːnaːˈkuli]) is a census-designated place (CDP) on the west coast of the island of Oʻahu, City and County of Honolulu, Hawaii, United States. In Hawaiian, nānā kuli means literally "look at knee". The population was 12,195 at the 2020 census.

== Geography ==
Nānākuli is 48 km (30 mi) away from Honolulu, and is located near the southern end of the Waiʻanae mountain. It is accessible from Farrington Highway, though most residents live in the valley. A popular park, Nānākuli Beach Park, is nearby.

== Demographics ==
Historical population
Census	Pop.	Note	%±
2020	12,195		—
U.S. Decennial Census

As of the 2020 census, there were 12,195 people, a 3.71% decrease from the 12,666 people living in Nānākuli in the 2010 census.

The median age was 31.5, the median household income was $75,031, the median property value was $370,600, the average car ownership was 2 cars per household, and the poverty rate was 15.3%. The 3 largest ethnic groups were Native Hawaiian and Other Pacific Islander (Non-Hispanic), Multiracial (Non-Hispanic), and Multiracial (Hispanic).

Ethnic group:	Percentage:
Native Hawaiian & Other Pacific Islander, Alone	52.5%
Multiracial (Two or More Races)	34.3%
Hispanic or Latino	12.5%
Asian, Alone	5.8%
White, Alone	5.0%
White (Non-Hispanic/Latino)	4.7%
American Indian & Alaskan Native, Alone	1.3%
Black, Alone	0.6%

== Native Hawaiian Community in Nānakuli ==
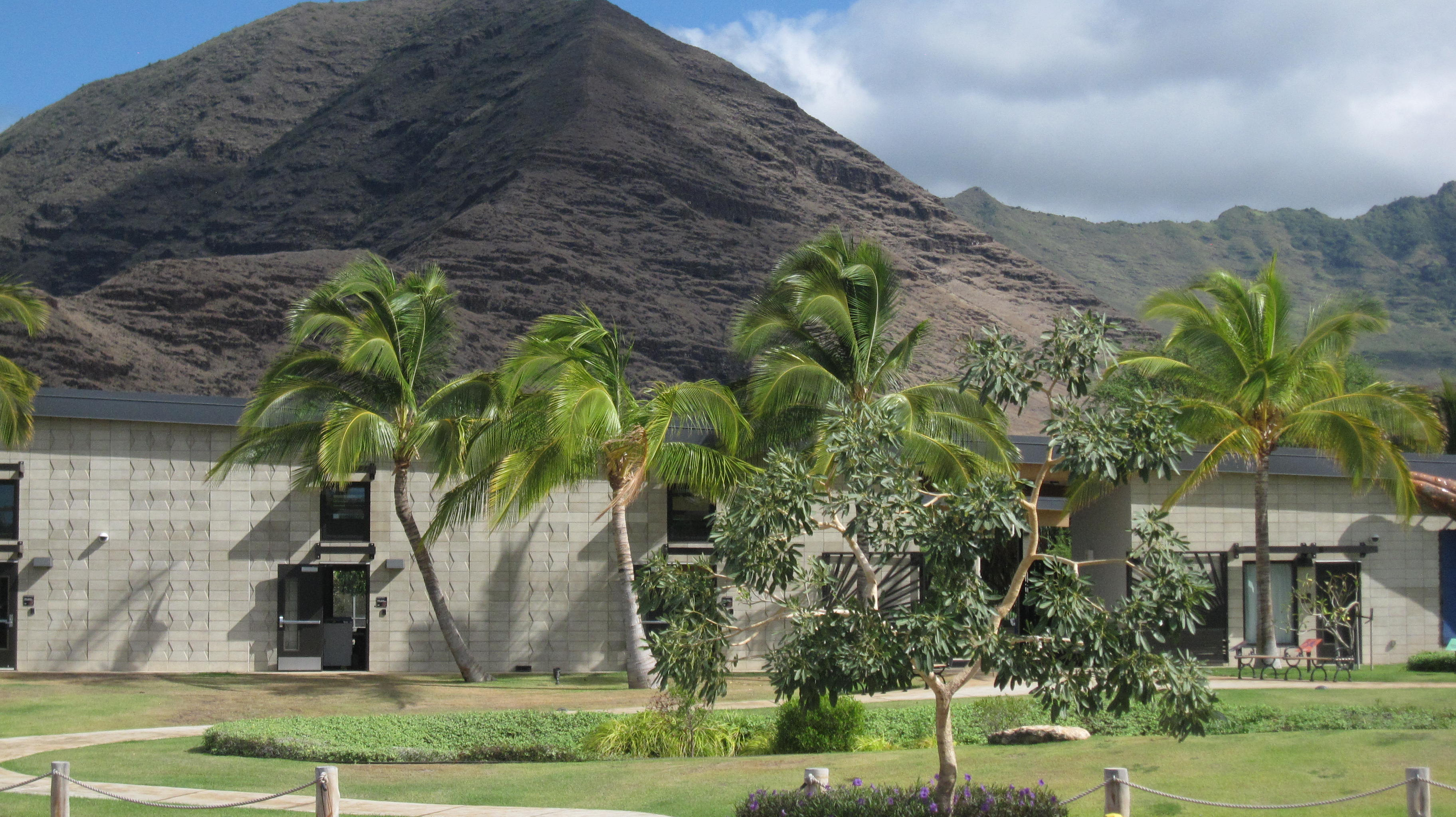
The Kalanihookaha Community Learning Center in Nānākuli is part of Kamehameha Schools.

Nānākuli is home to one of the oldest Hawaiian Home Land Divisions established through the Native Hawaiian Homes Commission Act of 1921, promoted by Prince Jonah Kūhiō Kalanianaʻole. The presence of DHHL (Department of Hawaiian Home Lands) has heavily influenced the Nānākuli community. Uniquely in the state of Hawaiʻi and for the last 50 years, three Nānākuli public schools have campuses located on Hawaiian Home Lands. These are Nānākuli High and Intermediate, Nānā I Ka Pono, and Nānākuli Elementary. Within the last two decades, Native Hawaiian based learning has been offered for students of the valley; at Nānākuli Elementary, kids can join a Hawaiian language immersion program (Kula Kai O Puni). Aside from the Department Of Education, there also exists "Ka Waihona O Ka Naʻauao Hawaiian Public Charter School". In recent years, the neighborhood board acknowledged the long-standing history of the valley and DHHL by renaming Nānākuli Beach Park after Kalaniʻanaole. Some other Native Hawaiian organizations that have reached out to this community are the Liliʻuokalani Trust (Formerly known as the Queen Liʻliʻuokalani Children's Center, The Office Of Hawaiian Affairs, and Kamehameha Schools). Only 3,970 reported residents identify with having some sort of Hawaiian ancestry out of the approximate population of 12,000.

In April 2021, Kamehameha Schools opened the Kalanihookaha Community Learning Center in Nānākuli.

== Education ==
The Hawaii Department of Education operates the public schools. Two elementary schools, Nanaikapono and Nanakuli, and the Nanakuli High & Intermediate School are in the CDP.

== Notable residents ==
- Konishiki Yasokichi
- Jason Momoa
- Radasha Ho'ohuli, Miss Hawaii USA 2006
- Raymond Kane
- Mark Tuinei (1960–1999), former NFL player
- MDMP, a rock band formed in 2017 by Nanakuli musician and producer Jeremey Meyer.
