= Keaʻau High School =

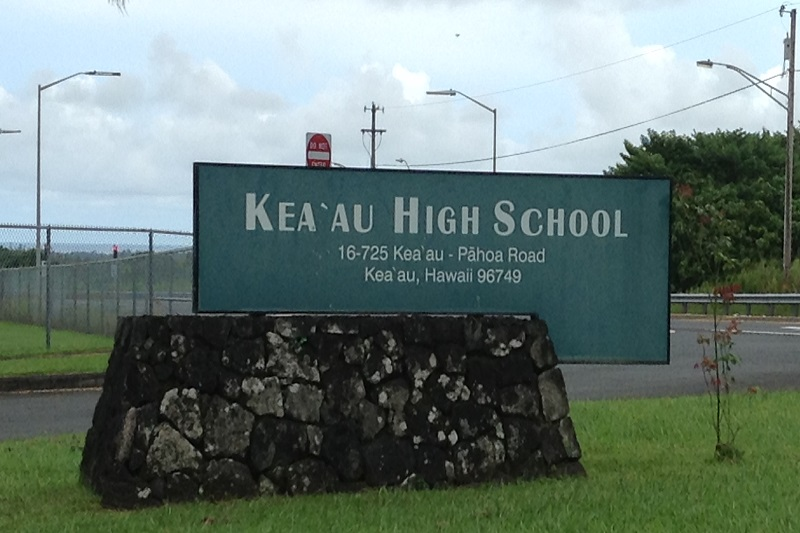

Location
- 16-725 Keaʻau-Pāhoa Road; Keaʻau, Hawaiʻi 96749; 19°36′43″N 155°1′53″W

Information
- Type: Public
- Established: 1999
- School district: Hawaii District
- Principal: Dean Cevallos
- Teaching staff: 70.00 FTE
- Grades: 9–12
- Student to teacher ratio: 14.87
- Campus size: 16 acres
- Campus type: Rural
- Colors: Scarlet red and navy blue
- Athletics conference: Big Island Interscholastic Federation
- Mascot: Cougar
- Accreditation: Western Association of Schools and Colleges
- Affiliation: State of Hawaii
- Website: keaauhs.com

Keaʻau High School is a public high school in Keaʻau, Hawaii, US built on 55 acres (22 ha) of land. The school is operated by the Hawaii Department of Education (HIDOE). Its mascot is the Cougar. Founded in 1999, it is the newest public high school on Hawaiʻi island.

== History ==
In 1997, an environmental study was conducted to build a new high school and elementary in the Keaʻau area. This was done after adjacent school Waiākea High was subject to overcrowding due to students from the Puna district attending the school. In anticipation for growth in Puna, the schools were approved for construction. The school opened in 1999 to 280 freshmen students, with the elementary school opening two years prior. The first graduating class graduated in 2003.

The State of Hawaii purchased the land from the Shipman Foundation. The state paid $687,835 for the land.

The school's campus is fronted by the Keaau-Pahoa Bypass Road. The road was intended to open in time for the school's opening, but as of July 1998, its opening was expected to be delayed.

The school was built in several phases. Phase one of the school opened its main classrooms and buildings. Subsequent phases, scheduled in 2000, resulted in the addition of various facilities, including sport stadiums, a cafeteria, and facilities for Career and Technical Education.

=== 2014 lava flow ===
As a result of the 2014 lava flow, students from the Pahoa High and Intermediate School were displaced and moved to Keaʻau High School.

== Campus ==
The school sits on 55 acres of land. It has many notable features, such as having individual student restrooms, a gymnasium, along with various sports facilities.

== Academics ==
Per the Hawaii Board of Education, the school requires a total of 24 credits to graduate. These are six credits in electives, four credits in English, four credits in social studies, three credits in mathematics, three credits in science, two credits in either Career and Technical Education, foreign language, or fine arts, one credit in physical education, half a credit in health, and half a credit in the Personal Transition Plan.

For dual-credit, the school offers Advanced Placement (AP) classes and Running Start. In the 2021–2022 school year, 13% took an AP Exam, with 9% passing. Running Start is offered through the University of Hawaii system.

In 2018, a plants database for the plants at the school was created. This initiative was funded by a grant, in which approximately 1,400 dollars was raised. To collect the information, students used various tools, including general positioning systems (GPS) and photography. The plant page is linked on the school's main website and is accessible to the public.

In 2023, the school implemented a cohort academy for freshmen students. This allows for students in the ninth grade to have individualized support and classes, before choosing a Career and Technical education pathway for their sophomore through senior year. The academy is accredited by the National Career Academy Coalition.

=== Administrators ===
The school has had a long history of administrators. The first principal, Peg 'O Brien, was put on a disciplinary move to Kaimuki Middle School by the Hawaii Department of Education. The second principal, Ann Paulino, was also placed on leave due to her mishandling of a disciplinary incident, with vice principal Ron Jarvis becoming the temporary principal in charge. The third principal, Dean Cavallos, started in 2011 and is the current principal as of the 2025-2026 school year.

=== Alternative learning programs ===
The school has implemented Uleupono, an alternative learning program for students who struggle in regular classes.

The Kula program is a program designed to help students who have committed HIDOE class A or B offenses as an alternative to suspension. Students in this program meet on Mondays and Fridays, and are given coursework from their regular teachers.

== Notable achievements ==
In 2010, science teacher John Constantinou won a Presidential Award for Excellence in Mathematics and Science Teaching. In the same year, the school won the LifeSmarts competition—a statewide consumer literacy and trivia contest—for the fourth consecutive year. In 2015, principal Dean Cevallos won the Masayuki Tokioka Excellence in School Leadership Award, an award given by the Masayuki Tokioka Foundation.

In 2025, Freshman Academy Coordinator Judith “Elise” Hannigan won the 2026 "State Teacher of the Year" award from the HIDOE.

== Notable incidents ==
In December 2006, a fight occurred which resulted a student getting a black eye and being transported to the hospital, along with six suspensions. During the fight, there were no security personnel, as they were all on leave.

In November 2009, a brawl occurred, resulting in the suspension or arrest of multiple students.

In April 2022, a student-led walkout, consisting of over 100 students, occurred when it was found out that an employed teacher was previously investigated for allegedly sleeping with underage students.

In September 2023, the school was criticized for its usage of security cameras inside of restroom facilities.

== Athletics ==
The school participates in the Big Island Interscholastic Federation (BIIF). Sports offered include air riflery, cheerleading, cross country, football, and girls' volleyball during the fall, boys' basketball, girls' basketball, paddling, boys' soccer, girls' soccer, swimming and diving, and wrestling during the winter, and baseball, girls' flag football, judo, tennis, track and field, girls' water polo, and boys volleyball during the spring.

== Clubs ==
The school offers a variety of clubs. Academic clubs include Advancement via Individual Determination (AVID), National Honor Society, Cougar Tech Robotics, which participates in the VEX Robotics Competition, STEM club, FFA, HOSA, and CyberPatriot. Service clubs include Key Club and Blue Zone club. For social clubs, the school offers Samahang Bayanihan, a Filipino club.

== Notable alumni ==
- Malaesala Aumavae–Laulu - American professional football guard
