= Kapaʻa High School =

Public high school in Hawaii, United States

Coordinates: 22°5.508′N 159°18.793′W

Location
- 4695 Mailihuna Rd; Kapaʻa, Hawaii 96746

Information
- School type: Public, Comprehensive high school
- Established: 1883
- School district: Hawaii State Department of Education
- Oversight: Western Association of Schools and Colleges, Accrediting Commission for Schools
- Principal: Tommy John Cox
- Staff: 56.00 (FTE)
- Grades: 9–12
- Enrollment: 1,005 (2022–2023)
- Student to teacher ratio: 17.95
- Language: English
- Campus: Suburban
- Area: Kapaʻa, Hawaii
- Colors: Green and White
- Athletics conference: Kauai Interscholastic Federation (KIF)
- Team name: Warriors
- Rivals: Waimea High School, Kauai High School
- Communities served: Kapaʻa, Hawaii
- Feeder schools: Hawaii School District
- Website: Official Website

Kapaʻa High School is a public high school in Kapaʻa, Hawaii on the island of Kauaʻi. It is a part of the Hawaii State Department of Education.

== History ==
Established in 1883 under the reign of King David Kalākaua, the school was first built directly above Kealia River and then moved up the hill to where it currently stands on Mailihuna Hill. In 1938, the school was officially declared a Junior High School and graduated its first 66 twelfth-grade students in 1946.

In 1997, the school was split due to the growing population. In addition to the expansion of the Kapaʻa schools such as Kapaʻa Elementary School, supporting K through 5th grade, Kapaʻa Middle School was newly created only a few miles away and was planned for grades 6, 7, and 8th. Kapaa High School and Intermediate had been serving grades 7 through 12. With the break off, the school became only 9th through 12th grade and renamed simply Kapaʻa High School.

== Campus ==
The campus has the stainless steel sculpture Hukilau by Wayne Zebzda and the mixed media sculpture Seven Pillars of Wisdom by Carol Kouchi Yotsuda.

== Mascots and school pride ==
Kapaʻa High School is home to one of the original Warriors mascots in Hawaii. The school sported the colors of green and white, which is reflected in the campus buildings, art, uniforms, and banners. Very much like in the University of Hawaiʻi at Mānoa, the terms "Warrior Pride" and "We Believe in Our Warriors" have been some of the common catch phrases.

On top of the school mascots each class picks its own mascot to represent their particular incoming year. For example, the mascot for the class of 2002 was the seal, class of 2003 was the dragon, 2004 was the "honu" or turtle, 2005 was the tiger, 2006 was the turtle, and 2007 was the "moʻo" or gecko . These mascots were often the main symbols in the class banners for assemblies and class competitions.
