= Kanu O Ka Aina New Century Charter School =

Coordinates: 20.016139°N 155.652575°W

- 64-1043 Hiʻiaka Street, Kamuela, HI, 96743

Information
- Enrollment: 600 (approximately) students
- Website: kanuokaaina.org

Kanu o ka ʻĀina New Century Public Charter School (KANU) is Hawaii's first native designed and controlled public charter school. It is in Kamuela, Hawaii. KANUʻs founder is Dr. Kū Kahakalau.

It is a K-12 school.
