= Kealakehe High School =

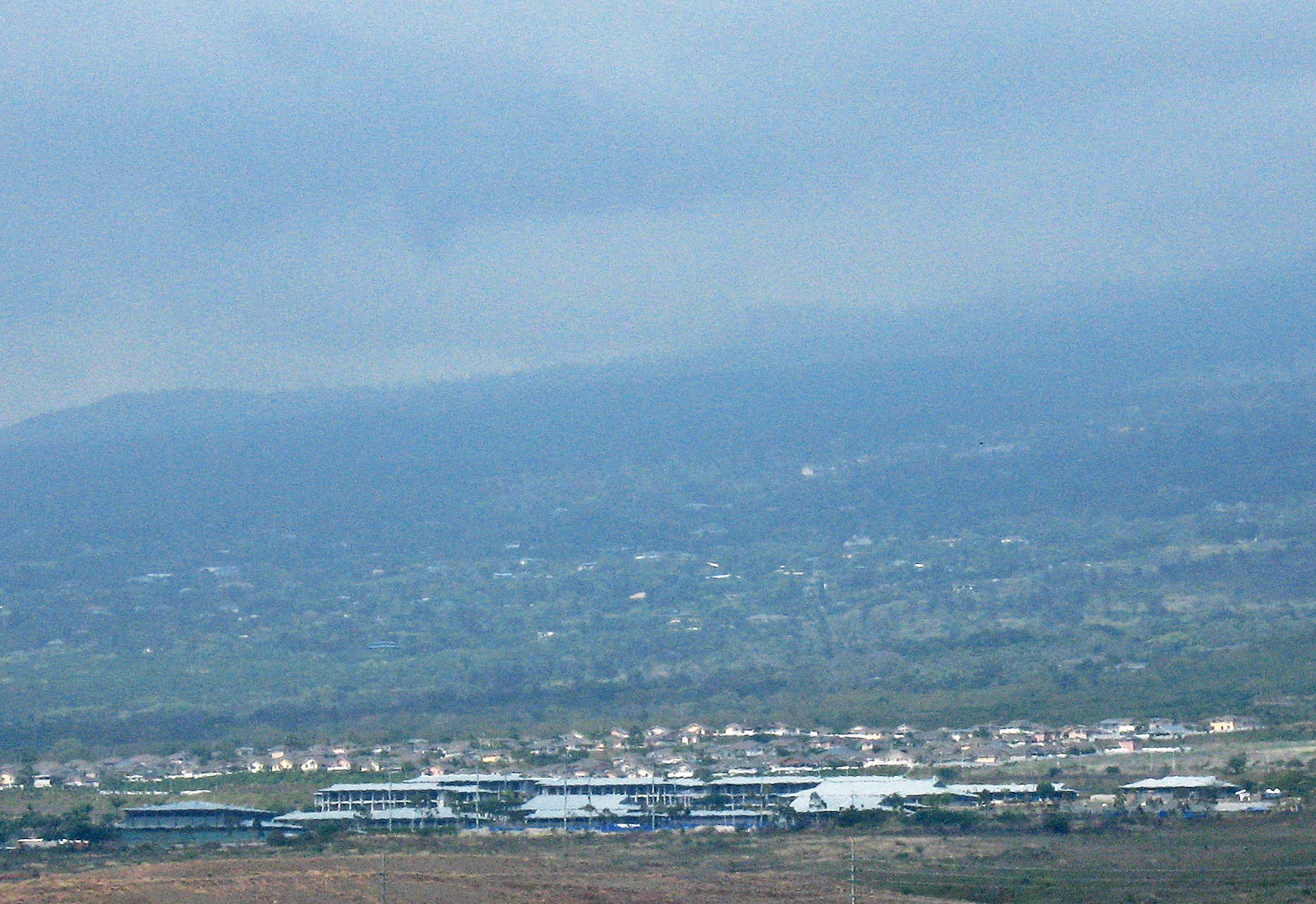

Location
- 74-5000 Pūʻohulihuli Street; Kailua-Kona, Hawaii 96740; United States; 19°40′13″N 155°59′53″W

Information
- Type: Public
- Motto: "Harmony and unity through dynamic education and community for everyone, every time."
- Established: 1997
- Principal: Kori Takaki
- Staff: 87.50 (FTE)
- Grades: 9–12
- Enrollment: 1,401 (2024–2025)
- Student to teacher ratio: 16.01
- Campus: Rural
- Campus size: 50 acres (200,000 m^{2})
- Campus type: Outdoor
- Colors: Blue & Silver
- Athletics conference: Big Island Interscholastic Federation
- Team name: WaveRiders
- Newspaper: The Wave
- Affiliation: State of Hawaiʻi
- Website: http://khswaveriders.org/

Kealakehe High School is a public high school located in Kailua, Hawaii County, Hawaii, United States. It has the largest geographic school attendance boundary in the state and covers a geographic district 40 miles (64 km) wide, encompassing the communities of Kailua-Kona, Hōlualoa, Waikōloa, and Puakō. The school motto is "Harmony and unity through dynamic education and community for everyone, every time." Established in 1997, the school serves grades 9–12. Its athletic teams, the WaveRiders, compete in the Big Island Interscholastic Federation.

== Kealakehe's mission ==
Encouraging partnerships among students, parents, faculty, staff and community by offering a curriculum which will address multi-intelligences and awareness; providing a safe environment which expects mutual respect; providing opportunities where all students can develop their gifts and talents to be productive members of the community.

== History ==
The high school established its 9th grade class first in 1997. Each year the subsequent grades were added, and the campus enlarged, to accommodate the first graduating class in 2001. A football stadium was added in 2003.

The school was built on 50 acres (200,000 m^{2}) in the Kealakehe ahupuaa (traditional land division) at coordinates 19°40′13″N 155°59′53″W, on the slope of Hualālai. Kealakehe Intermediate School and Kealakehe Elementary School are also located nearby. The Kaloko-Honokōhau National Historical Park and Honokōhau Harbour are downhill from the schools. The name means "the winding path" in the Hawaiian Language.

== Notable achievements ==
In 2007, the Milken Family Foundation awarded mathematics teacher Yannabah Lewis with a $25,000 Milken Award.

== Extracurricular activities ==
=== Sports ===
A wide variety of sports is offered at Kealakehe, Fall sports include: football, cheerleading, bowling, girls volleyball, cross country, and riflery. Winter sports include: boys basketball, girls basketball, boys soccer, girls soccer, wrestling, swimming, and canoe paddling. Spring sports include: baseball (boys), golf, judo, softball (girls), tennis, track and field, boys volleyball, and girls water polo. All of which, compete under the Big Island Interscholastic Federation (BIIF). In order to play sports, there is a requirement of a minimum 2.0 GPA, a passing grade in all core classes, and must be passing citizenship class.

Between 2004 and 2024, the Kealakehe football team has won the Division I BIIF title seven times. The boys soccer team won the title nine times between 2008 and 2017. The girls soccer team has won the 2011–2012, and 2012–2013 BIIF Division I title. In 2011–2012 they were undefeated. In 2012–2013, in the state championships they got 7th place. In 2009, the girls swim team, with only five girls, won the State Championships.

=== Academic programs ===
- Academic Decathlon – 3rd in the state two years in a row
- Academic World Quest- 1st place in the 2010, 2024, and 2025 Hawaii Island Competition
- FIRST Robotics Competition – Started in 2010. Nine times FRC World Championship Qualifiers.
- Model United Nations
- National Honor Society
- Ocean Bowl – 1st place in 2007 and 2nd in 2008 (team members: Riley Saito, Emma Leonard, Todd Yamakawa, Sarah Crawford, Conrad Sanborn, Julius Guiterrez) −3rd place in 2010
- Math League
- Science Bowl – 2nd place in 2008 (states)
- Science Fair – Kealakehe high school took 2nd place states(2019) and 3rd place internationally at Intel ISEF(Intel Science and Engineering Fair)(2019), additionally Kealakehe took winning places 1–5 (2008 district); 1st, 2nd, 3rd, and 4th (2007 district); and 1st, 2nd, 3rd, and 5th (2006 district).

=== AP courses ===
As of the 2020–2021 school year, the AP classes Kealakehe High School offer are: AP Literature Composition, AP World History, AP US History, AP Govt/Politics US, AP Chemistry, AP Physics, AP Environmental Science, AP Calculus, AP Statistics, AP 3D design, AP Computer Science AB, AP Computer Science Principles, AP Seminar, and AP Research.

=== Clubs ===
- Associated Student Body (ASB)
- Athletics
- Future Farmers of America
- Interact Club
- Key Club
- Model UN
- National Honors Society (NHS)
- Travel Club
- WaveRider Pride Club

=== Relay For Life ===
In February 2008, Kealakehe High School raised over $15,000. In February 2009, Kealakehe High School raised $27,227.65.

=== Graphic design ===
Kealakehe High School received 8 awards at the recent 2008 HTEA Fair held in Honolulu's Blaisdell Center for their graphic arts and designs.

== Advanced Global Citizenship ==
Advanced Global Citizenship consists of Speech and Debate, Model UN, Model APEC, World Quest, and TED Talks. It is aimed to raise awareness of international relations as well as to consume intellectual ideas. Matt Buongiorno explained AGC as following: "Advanced Global Citizenship offers things conventional curriculum cannot, such as an opportunity to work with pressing international issues outside the classroom and beyond the island," and Justin Brown added that it "broadens their awareness and understanding of international affairs in an exciting, competitive way."

=== Model United Nations ===
– Model United Nations is an organization that works to promote international relations studies through debating and negotiating. Students are assigned a country to represent and become a diplomat defending the country's position in different committees. KHS Model UN was created in the year 2010 when Justin Brown and Matthew Buongiorno, experienced college Model UN delegates, decided that international relations would change students' perspective of world.

The team first participated in the 2011 National High School Model United Nations (NHSMUN) Conference in New York City in March 2011. In NHSMUN, 3000 students from 150 schools of over twenty different countries participated, and the opportunity kindled interests in international studies to KHS students. NHSMUN experience showed success in Model APEC held in West Hawaii Civic Center, November 28, 2011, when the Kealakehe team led students from other districts to learn what it is like to negotiate as a diplomat.

The team attended the Regional High School Model United Nations Conference in San Francisco December 1–3, 2011, where they won the Outstanding Conference Preparation and Research award. The team will be attending their second National High School Model United Nations Conference in New York City, March 7–10, 2012. They hope to go to future conferences in the United States and aspire to attend a conference in China in the following years. The team filled a void in Kealakehe High School's curriculum; a need for international relations studies. The success of Kealakehe High School's Model United Nations team jump-started other Advanced Global Citizenship programs, as well as an AP class, and has sparked interest in international relations, policy, and study.

== Kealakehe Robotics (Tiki Technologies, Team 3880) ==
Started in 2010, Kealakehe High School has one of the state's most successful robotics programs. The team participates annually in FIRST (For Inspiration and Recognition of Science and Technology), Botball, VEX Robotics, and MATE ROV (Remotely operated underwater vehicle). The team's formal competition name is Tiki Technologies known colloquially as 'The Tiki Techs'. All members of the team complete United States Department of Labor Occupational Safety and Health Administration safety training gaining their General Industry 10-hour card. Team members participate in the Stanford University Design Thinking and Massachusetts Institute of Technology OCW satellite training. The team participates in a variety of community service projects to give back to the community that supports them. In 2011, the Tiki Techs received a proclamation from Hawaii State Governor Neil Abercrombie for their successes. More information about the team can be found at www.kealakeherobotics.org.

=== Botball ===
Kealakehe won the judges' award at the 2010 Honolulu Botball Regional held at the Hawaii Convention Center in Honolulu. Botball is a robotics competition for middle and high school students. Organized by the KISS Institute for Practical Robotics, Botball encourages participants to work constructively within their team building basic communication, problem-solving, design, and programming skills. Each team builds one or more (up to four) robots that will autonomously move scoring objects into scoring positions.

=== FIRST ===
In their rookie FIRST season, Kealakehe partnered with Waialua and McKinney robotics to win 2011 FIRST Honolulu competition (Logo Motion held at the Stan Sheriff Center on the campus of University of Hawaiʻi at Mānoa. The team was also awarded the GMC Excellence in Industrial Engineering Award. With this victory, the team received a prestigious invitation to the FIRST Championship held at the Edward Jones Dome in St Louis, Missouri. The team has been invited to the championship 8 other times since, in 2012, 2013, 2014, 2015, 2016, 2018, 2024, and 2025.

On August 14, 2011, ABC aired a special on FIRST called "i.am FIRST: Science is Rock and Roll" that featured many famous musical artists such as The Black Eyed Peas and Willow Smith. will.i.am himself was the executive producer of the special. The program placed a special focus on the FIRST Robotics competition, even though it included segments on the FIRST Tech Challenge, FIRST Lego League Challenge, and FIRST Lego League Explore. Kealakehe Robotics was one of the teams at the event for the ABC piece.

=== Underwater Robotics ===
The Marine Advanced Technology Education (MATE) Center sponsors an annual international ROV competition; the first competition was held in 2002. The competition is open to middle school (grades 5–8), high school (grades 9–12), community and technical college, and four-year university students as well as home-schooled students of comparable grade levels.

=== VEX ===
Kealakehe captained winning alliance the last two years winning the 2010 Hawaii VEX Robotics Competition held at the ʻImiloa Astronomy Center and the 2011 Maui Fair VEX Competition. With these wins the team attended the International VEX competition at ESPN's Wide World of Sports Complex at Disney World on April 14–16, 2011 and will attended the 2012 VEX National Competition in Omaha, Nebraska as well as the 2012 VEX International Competition at Disneyland April 18–21, 2012.

== Graduation requirements ==
The graduation requirements as of 2021 is 24 credits: 4 Social Studies credits; including Civics, Modern Hawaiian History, World History, and the United States History; 4 English credits; 3 Math credits, 3 Science credits,5 Health credits; .5 Personal Transition Plan (PTP) credit; and 1 Physical Education credit 6 elective credits, 2 "consecutive electives"(2 credits in: World Language OR Career and Technical Education OR Fine Arts). In order to be a class valedictorian students must do a senior project which is worth 1 credit (earning a total of 25 credits for a BOE recognized diploma-students must have a minimum 3.0 GPA to earn this type of diploma). Passing all 4 years of citizenship (equivalent to 1 year of social studies and 1 year of elective credit) is required in order to walk the line at graduation. A passing grade in citizenship is currently 85%. A student not passing citizenship can make up their year grade if they are in the 80–84% range.

== Notable alumni ==
Listed alphabetically by last name:

- Asotui Eli, football player
- Dru Kanuha, politician
- John Ursua, football player
