= AP Capstone =

Diploma program for high school students in the US

AP Capstone, officially known as the Advanced Placement Capstone Diploma Program, is a two-year program for high school students in the United States and Canada, developed by the College Board. It consists of two courses: AP Seminar and AP Research. Students who successfully complete the program and obtain scores of 3 or higher on at least four other AP exams receive either an AP Capstone Diploma or an AP Seminar and Research Certificate.

== History ==
The predecessor to the current AP Capstone program, the AP/Cambridge Capstone Program, was initially offered in 17 high schools worldwide. With the launch of the full AP Capstone by the College Board in fall 2014, the program has expanded to now being offered in 1100 schools. Over 100 colleges and universities support the AP Capstone program.

== AP Seminar ==
AP Seminar is the foundation course taken in 10th or 11th grade. It provides students the opportunity to develop critical thinking skills and prepare for university. Students explore real-world issues such as innovation, sustainability and technology. The assessment culminates in 2 through-course tasks and a final written exam. The through-course tasks are the following:

- Task 1: An Individual Research Report and a Team Multimedia Presentation
  - Task description: Students form a team of two to four students to create a presentation on a specific topic based on their Individual Research Reports. Once team members decide on a topic, each member will research a specific perspective of their team topic. For example, if the team project was the ongoing Opioid epidemic, member might research the economic impact of the epidemic, or the socioeconomic factors fueling the epidemic. This research is compiled into a 1080-1320 word Individual Research Report. Once the research reports are finished, students will return to their teams and combine their research into an eight to ten minute presentation. The presentation is followed by oral defense where each team member responds to one question relating to their presentation from a teacher.
- Task 2: An Individual Written Argument, Individual Multimedia Presentation, and a set of Oral Defense questions.
  - Task description: Students are provided stimulus material from the College Board to create an 1800-2200 word argumentative essay. This stimulus material is the same for all students taking AP Seminar. The argument cannot be based solely off the stimulus material, outside research and sources are expected. This argument serves as the foundation for the Individual Multimedia Presentation. Students create a presentation that outlines the argument they made in their previous paper. The presentation is expected to last for six to eight minutes. Following this presentation, students are required to defend their presentation by responding to questions from the teacher grading the presentation.

The final written exam is taken during the two weeks of AP testing in May. The exam consists of two sections. In the first section, students are given an article selected by the College Board. Students must evaluate the central claim, line of reasoning, and the evidence of the article. In the second section, students are given four stimulus materials and are expected to create an argumentative essay. Students are allotted two hours for the final exam.

Score	2015	2016	2017	2018	2019	2020	2021	2022	2023	2024	2025	2026
5	4.9%	6.6%	6.7%	7.9%	7.1%	6.4%	11.1%	11.6%	11.4%	9.4%	9.4%	10%
4	11.7%	12.6%	15.1%	16.7%	15.1%	14.5%	19.5%	19.2%	19.7%	19.8%	18.9%	21%
3	58.3%	53.8%	65%	57.6%	58.9%	59.8%	54.5%	51.8%	53.9%	56.5%	55.0%	57%
2	21.6%	21.8%	11.6%	15.4%	16.6%	17.0%	10.7%	11.8%	11.2%	10.3%	12.5%	10%
1	3.5%	5.2%	1.6%	2.4%	2.3%	2.2%	4.3%	5.6%	3.8%	4%	4.2%	2%
% of Scores 3 or Higher	74.9%	73%	86.8%	82.2%	81.1%	80.7%	85.0%	82.6%	85.0%	89%	83.4%	88%
Mean Score	2.93	2.94	3.14	3.12	3.08	3.06	3.22	3.19	3.24	3.20	3.17	
Standard Deviation	0.81	0.90	0.76	0.85	0.83	0.81	0.93	0.98	0.93	0.89	0.91	
Number of Students	5,288	12,308	19,943	30,964	43,441	52,562	53,076	56,766	73,334	94,394	126,001	167,000

== AP Research ==
After successful completion of AP Seminar, students may participate in AP Research. In AP Research students design, plan and conduct a year-long research-based investigation on a personally-chosen subject. The assessment culminates with a 5,000-word academic thesis paper, as well as a public presentation. Students must obtain a final score of 3 or higher to be able to receive AP certification.

As of the 2017–18 school year, AP Research papers are graded using a holistic rubric. The two central elements that move a paper from a 2 to a 3 are the middle two rows, which assess the methodology and conclusion. The rubric can be seen here.

More specifically, a replicable methodology and a new understanding are required to pass.

Score	2016	2017	2018	2019	2020	2021	2022	2023	2024	2025	2026
5	11.6%	16.8%	11.4%	10.7%	8.8%	13.7%	12.6%	13.3%	12.6%	14.8%	17%
4	16.3%	18.1%	23.7%	22.2%	32.1%	25.4%	25.8%	26.4%	26%	28.1%	31%
3	39.3%	35.4%	40.1%	43.0%	31.5%	42.4%	44.3%	44.7%	47.5%	45.6%	42%
2	30.8%	27.3%	19.8%	19.5%	25%	14.2%	13.3%	12.5%	11.5%	9.3%	8%
1	2.0%	2.5%	4.9%	4.6%	2.5%	4.3%	4.0%	3.1%	2.4%	2.2%	2%
% of Scores 3 or Higher	67.2%	70.3%	75.2%	75.9%	72.5%	81.5%	82.7%	84.4%	86.1%	88.5%	90%
Mean	3.05	3.20	3.17	3.15	3.20	3.30	3.30	3.34	3.35	3.44	
Standard Deviation	1.01	1.09	1.03	1.00	0.99	1.01	0.98	0.96	0.92	0.93	
Number of Students	2,842	5,787	9,640	15,724	20,055	24,021	26,947	28,402	35,469	43,214	53,000

== Program completion ==
- AP Capstone Certificate
  - 3+ on both AP Seminar and AP Research
- AP Capstone Diploma
  - 3+ on both AP Seminar and AP Research
  - 3+ on 4 additional AP exams of student choice
