= Nanakuli High and Intermediate School =

Coordinates: 21.387744°N 158.133923°W

Nānākuli High and Intermediate School

Location
- 89-980 Nānākuli Avenue; Waiʻanae, Hawaii 96792; United States

Information
- Type: Public, Co-educational
- Motto: "E Poʻokela, Striving together for Excellence"
- Established: 1967
- School district: Leeward District
- Principal: Dr. Christine Udarbe-Valdez
- Faculty: 119.00 (FTE)
- Grades: 7-12
- Enrollment: 1,933 (2022-2023)
- Student to teacher ratio: 16.24
- Campus: Rural
- Colors: Black and Gold
- Athletics: Oahu Interscholastic Association
- Mascot: Golden Hawk
- Military: United States Army JROTC
- Website: nanakuligoldenhawks.org

Nānākuli High and Intermediate School (NHIS) is a public secondary school in the Nānākuli CDP, City and County of Honolulu, Hawaii, United States. It was established in 1967 and serves grades 7 through 12. It is operated by the Hawaii Department of Education.

By 2012 the school began the New Tech Academy, a non-profit program dedicated to project based learning, with plans for all high school students to begin the program the following year. According to Hill, the school had a bad reputation with fight videos appearing on social media but that "the school is more than the on-campus fights, its students are more than they’ve been stereotyped to be and not all of its teachers give up and leave. Not that the school doesn’t face big challenges."

As of 2012 it is the sole combined middle and high school of its school district. The campus exhibits the copper and bronze sculpture Tree of Knowledge by Satoru Abe.

== History ==
The school opened in 1967 in the eastern portion of the former facility of Nanaikapono Elementary & Intermediate School, hitherto a combined elementary and middle school. The other part of the former campus became a standalone elementary school. Its current campus opened in 1972.

== Operations ==
In 2012, Teach for America (TFA) supplied many of the teachers who were newly hired.

== Programs ==
Hill praised the school's programs in 2012.
