= Waialua High and Intermediate School =

High school in Waialua, Hawaii, United States

Coordinates: 21.565671°N 158.125615°W

Waialua High and Intermediate School is a public intermediate and high school for grades 7–12 in the Waialua CDP in City and County of Honolulu, Hawaii on the Island of Oahu.

The campus boasts the painted plastic mural A Waialua Day by Balazs Szabo and the mixed media sculpture Waialua from Ken Shutt's Konohiki Series.

== History ==
The school was founded in 1914 as a single-roomed school called Mokuleia School. In 1927 Andrew E. Cox donated 15-acre (61,000 m^{2}) tracts of land for the school's campus, and it was renamed Andrew E. Cox Junior High School. In 1937 the school was enlarged to include a senior high school and was renamed to its present name.

== Notable alumni ==
- Megan Abubo, surfer
- Shane Dorian, surfer
- Richard Matsuura, former member of the Hawaii Senate
