= Pahoa High and Intermediate School =

- Logo of Pahoa High and Intermediate School

Location
- 15-3038 Puna Road; Pahoa, Hawai'i, Hawai'i 96778; United States

Information
- School type: Public
- Established: 1910
- Principal: Kim Williamson
- Teaching staff: 59.00 (FTE)
- Grades: 7-12
- Enrollment: 745 (2024-2025)
- Student to teacher ratio: 12.63
- Campus type: Rural
- Colors: Green , White
- Mascot: Daggers
- Website: www.pahoahis.org

Pahoa High & Intermediate School is a public, co-educational high school and middle school of the Hawaii State Department of Education. It serves grades seven through twelve and was established in 1910.

== General information ==
Pahoa High & Intermediate School is located in Pahoa in Hawaii County on the Island of Hawaiʻi. The campus is located at 15-3038 Puna Road, across the street from Pahoa Elementary School, one of its feeder schools. The other is Keonepoko Elementary School. The school's mascot is the Daggers, and its school colors are green and white.

== History ==
Pahoa School was established in 1910 for students from the rural Puna District communities. The high school was established along with a middle school and an elementary school; all three schools were administered as one campus until the fall of 1993. In 1914, the school was renamed Pahoa High & Elementary School. The original buildings on campus are still in use including the front High School building, the gymnasium and two of the elementary school buildings. At one time, the high school had five feeder schools, with students being bussed in as far away as Volcano, 35 miles away.

The original main elementary school building was torn down in 1979 and replaced with a new two-story building and portable classroom buildings. At the same time on the High School and Intermediate School campus, a new parking lot adjacent to the gymnasium, a three-story classroom building, a two-story building and six new one-story buildings were constructed. The following year, another two-story building along with a new cafeteria, a track and football field, basketball/tennis courts and a baseball/softball field were added on the High School side. In 1981 a 45-space parking lot was constructed behind the Intermediate School along with a few portable classrooms.

The school significantly grew over the years, especially in the late 1970s when the rural Puna district was sectioned off into subdivisions after the Sugar industry went under. Pahoa High doubled in size during this period, and many new buildings were built on the campus. Beginning with the 1993-1994 school year, the elementary school began to be administered as a separate campus (the present-day Pahoa Elementary School), while the high school was accordingly renamed Pahoa High & Intermediate School. In 1999, Keaau High School was constructed ten miles away to relieve Pahoa High & Intermediate School's overcrowded 2,500 student body, virtually downsizing it in half. Keaau High School has since become Pahoa High & Intermediate School's chief athletic rival. In 2012, a new gymnasium opened on the south end of the campus, adjacent to the athletic fields.

== Sports ==
Football

Softball

Baseball

Basketball

Volleyball

Track

Cross Country

Paddling

== Commencement ==
Pahoa High & Intermediate School's commencement exercises are normally held during the third week of May.
