= List of high schools in Hawaii =

This is a complete list of high schools in the U.S. state of Hawaiʻi. There are four school districts on the island of Oahu: Honolulu District, Central Oahu District, Leeward Oahu and Windward Oahu.

== Honolulu ==
=== Public ===
- Farrington High School, Kalihi
- Kaimuki High School, Kaimukī
- Kaiser High School, Hawaiʻi Kai
- Kalani High School, East Honolulu
- McKinley High School, Central Honolulu
- Moanalua High School, Moanalua/Salt Lake
- Radford High School, Aliamanu/Pearl Harbor
- Roosevelt High School, Makiki
- Myron B. Thompson Academy, Honolulu
- Hawaii Technology Academy, Waipahu
- University Laboratory School, Honolulu

=== Private ===
- Academy of the Pacific
- ASSETS School
- Christian Academy
- Damien Memorial School
- Hawaii Baptist Academy
- Hawaiian Mission Academy
- ʻIolani School
- Kaimuki Christian School
- Kamehameha Schools
- La Pietra (Hawaii School for Girls)
- Le Jardin Academy
- Maryknoll School
- Mid-Pacific Institute
- Pacific Buddhist Academy
- Punahou School
- Sacred Hearts Academy
- St. Andrew's Priory School
- Saint Louis School
- Varsity International School
- Waldorf Academy

== Greater Oʻahu ==
=== Public ===
- ʻAiea High School, Aiea
- Campbell High School, ʻEwa Beach
- Castle High School, Kāneʻohe
- Kahuku High & Intermediate School, Kahuku
- Kailua High School, Kailua
- Kalāheo High School, Kailua
- Kapolei High School, Kapolei
- Leilehua High School, Wahiawā
- Mililani High School, Mililani
- Nānākuli High & Intermediate School, Nānākuli
- Olomana High & Intermediate School, Kailua
- Pearl City High School, Pearl City
- Waiʻanae High School, Waiʻanae
- Waialua High and Intermediate School, Waialua
- Waipahu High School, Waipahu

=== Charter ===
- DreamHouse High School, Kapolei

=== Private ===
- American Renaissance Academy, Kapolei
- Friendship Christian School, ʻEwa Beach
- Hanalani Schools, Mililani
- Island Pacific Academy, Kapolei
- Lanakila Baptist High School, ʻEwa Beach
- Le Jardin Academy, Kailua

== Niʻihau ==
- Niʻihau High & Elementary School, Niʻihau

== Kauaʻi ==
=== Public ===
- Kapaʻa High School, Kapaʻa
- Kauaʻi High School, Līhuʻe
- Waimea High School, Waimea

=== Private ===
- Island School, Līhuʻe
- Kahili Adventist School, Koloa

== Molokaʻi ==
- Molokaʻi High School, Hoʻolehua

== Lānaʻi ==
- Lanai High and Elementary School

== Maui ==
=== Public ===
- Henry Perrine Baldwin High School, Wailuku
- Hāna High and Elementary School, Hana
- King Kekaulike High School, Pukalani
- Lahainaluna High School, Lahaina
- Maui High School, Kahului
- Kihei Charter School, Kihei
- Kulanihakoi High School, Kihei

=== Private ===
- Kamehameha Schools Maui Campus, Pukalani
- Maui Preparatory Academy, Napili
- St. Anthony High School, Wailuku
- Seabury Hall College Preparatory School, Makawao
- Ka'ahumanu Hou Christian School & Noah's Ark Preschool, Kahului

== Big Island ==
=== Public ===
- Hilo High School, Hilo
- Honokaʻa High & Intermediate School, Honokaʻa
- Kaʻū High & Pāhala Elementary School, Pāhala
- Ke Kula o Ehunuikaimalino, Kealakekua (K-12)
- Keaʻau High School, Keaʻau
- Kealakehe High School, Kailua-Kona
- Kohala High School, Kapaʻau
- Konawaena High School, Kealakekua
- Pāhoa High & Intermediate, Pahoa
- Waiakea High School, Hilo

=== Public charter ===
- Connections School, Hilo
- Hawaii Academy of Arts and Sciences, Pāhoa
- Ke Ana Laʻahana Charter School, Hilo
- Ke Kula ʻo Nāwahīokalaniʻōpuʻu, Keaʻau
- Laupāhoehoe Community Public Charter School, Laupahoehoe
- West Hawaiʻi Explorations Academy Public Charter School, Kailua Kona

=== Private ===
- Hawaiʻi Preparatory Academy (HPA), Kamuela
- Hualalai Academy, Kailua Kona
- Kamehameha Schools Hawaii Campus, Keaʻau
- Makua Lani Christian Academy, Kailua Kona
- Parker School, Kamuela
- St. Joseph High School (Hilo, Hawaii), Hilo
- Christian Liberty Academy (CLA), Keaʻau

== See also ==
- List of middle schools in Hawaii
- List of elementary schools in Hawaii
- Hawaiʻi State Department of Education, sole centralized school district for the state
