= List of elementary schools in Hawaii =

This is a list of elementary schools in the U.S. state of Hawaiʻi.

== Honolulu ==
=== Public ===
School name	City	Grades	Establishment	Charter
Abraham Lincoln Elementary	Honolulu	K-5	1908	
Admiral Chester W. Nimitz Elementary	Honolulu	K-6	1954	
ʻĀina Haina Elementary	Honolulu	K-5	1951	
Ala Wai Elementary	Honolulu	K-5	1954	
Āliamanu Elementary	Honolulu	K-6	1957	
Aliʻiolani Elementary	Honolulu	K-5	1925	
Education Laboratory NCPCS	Honolulu	K-12	2001	charter
Mayor Joseph J. Fern Elementary	Honolulu	K-5	1924	
Hahaʻione Elementary	Honolulu	K-5	1967	
Halau Lokahi NCPCS	Honolulu	K-12	2001	charter
Lt. Col. Horace Meek Hickam Elementary	Honolulu	K-6	1950	
Hokulani Elementary	Honolulu	K-5	1958	
Kaʻewai Elementary	Honolulu	K-5	1956	
Kāhala Elementary	Honolulu	K-6	1954	
Kalihi Elementary	Honolulu	K-5	1954	
Kalihi Kai Elementary	Honolulu	K-5	1913	
Kalihi Uka Elementary	Honolulu	K-5	1920	
Kalihi Waena Elementary	Honolulu	K-5	1888	
Kamiloʻiki Elementary	Honolulu	K-5	1970	
Kapālama Elementary	Honolulu	K-5	1927	
Kauluwela Elementary	Honolulu	K-5	1888	
Ke Kula Kaiapuni ʻo Ānuenue	Honolulu	K-12	1958	
King William C. Lunalilo Elementary	Honolulu	K-5	1923	
Koko Head Elementary	Honolulu	K-5	1954	
Lanakila Elementary	Honolulu	K-5	1925	
Liholiho Elementary	Honolulu	K-5	1926	
Likelike Elementary	Honolulu	K-5	1922	
Linapuni Elementary	Honolulu	K-2	1965	
Maʻemaʻe Elementary	Honolulu	K-6	1896	
Major General William R. Shafter Elementary	Honolulu	K-6	1966	
Makalapa Elementary	Honolulu	K-6	1971	
Mānoa Elementary	Honolulu	K-6	1945	
Mayor John H. Wilson Elementary	Honolulu	K-6	1961	
Moanalua Elementary	Honolulu	K-6	1961	
Mokulele Elementary	Honolulu	K-6	1960	
Myron B. Thompson Academy NCPCS	Honolulu	K-12	2001	charter
Noelani Elementary	Honolulu	K-6	1962	
Nuʻuanu Elementary	Honolulu	K-5	1960	
Palolo Elementary	Honolulu	K-5	1921	
Pauoa Elementary	Honolulu	K-5	1847	
Pearl Harbor Elementary	Honolulu	K-6	1956	
Pearl Harbor Kai Elementary	Honolulu	K-6	1943	
President Thomas Jefferson Elementary	Honolulu	K-5	1933	
Prince Jonah Kūhiō Elementary	Honolulu	K-5	1884	
Princess Victoria Kaʻiulani Elementary	Honolulu	K-5	1899	
Puʻuhale Elementary	Honolulu	K-5	1929	
Queen Kaʻahumanu Elementary	Honolulu	K-5	1900	
Red Hill Elementary	Honolulu	K-6	1968	
Royal Elementary	Honolulu	K-5	1839	
Salt Lake Elementary	Honolulu	K-6	1970	
Voyager PCS	Honolulu	K-8	2000	charter
Waiʻalae Elementary PCS	Honolulu	K-5	1927	charter
Waikiki Elementary	Honolulu	K-6	1880	

==== Inouye Elementary School ====
Daniel K. Inouye Elementary opened in 1959 as Hale Kula Elementary School, and it was given its current name on April 19, 2016.

Liliʻuokalani Elementary School

Named for Queen Liliʻuokalani, Queen Liliʻuokalani Elementary School opened in Kaimuki in 1912. In March 2011, due to low enrollment, the Hawai'i State Board of Education voted to close the school.

==== Pearl Harbor Elementary School ====
In 2003 the Hawaii Senate voted $2,500,000 to plan, design, and construct a library for the school.

The Hawaii Federal Fire Department chose this school to launch the 2004 Fire Prevention Week on October 5, 2004.

Kindergarten teacher Ruth Komatsu was named in January 1997 as one of Hawaii's Top Teachers.

Notable alumni:

- Deborah Wiles, children's author.

==== Red Hill Elementary School ====
The campus boasts two 1976 sculptures by Claude Horan, Hoʻolaulea and Cecil.

Red Hill Elementary has recognized as a 2014 National Blue Ribbon School.

==== Solomon Elementary School ====
Solomon Elementary's namesake was a member of the Wolfhounds. The dedication of the original campus was on November 11, 1969 while the dedication of the current facility occurred on November 9, 2019. In the 2016–2017 school year it had 933 students. The Department of Defense’s Office of Economic Adjustment funded the construction of the current campus with a $70,248,901. The State of Hawaii added an additional $20,000,000 to the funding. The current campus has four buildings, with each up to two stories tall, and a capacity of above 800. These buildings have 63 classrooms total.

==== Wailupe Valley Elementary School ====
Wailupe Valley opened in East Honolulu in 1958. Following a school consolidation analysis, the school was closed in 2009.

=== Private ===
- Hawaii Baptist Academy, Honolulu
- ʻIolani School, Honolulu
- Kamehameha Schools, Honolulu
- Le Jardin Academy, Kailua
- Maryknoll School, Honolulu
- Mid-Pacific Institute, Honolulu
- Myron B. Thompson Academy, Honolulu
- Punahou School, Honolulu
- Sacred Hearts Academy, Honolulu
- Saint Andrew's Priory School for Girls, Honolulu

== Greater Oʻahu ==
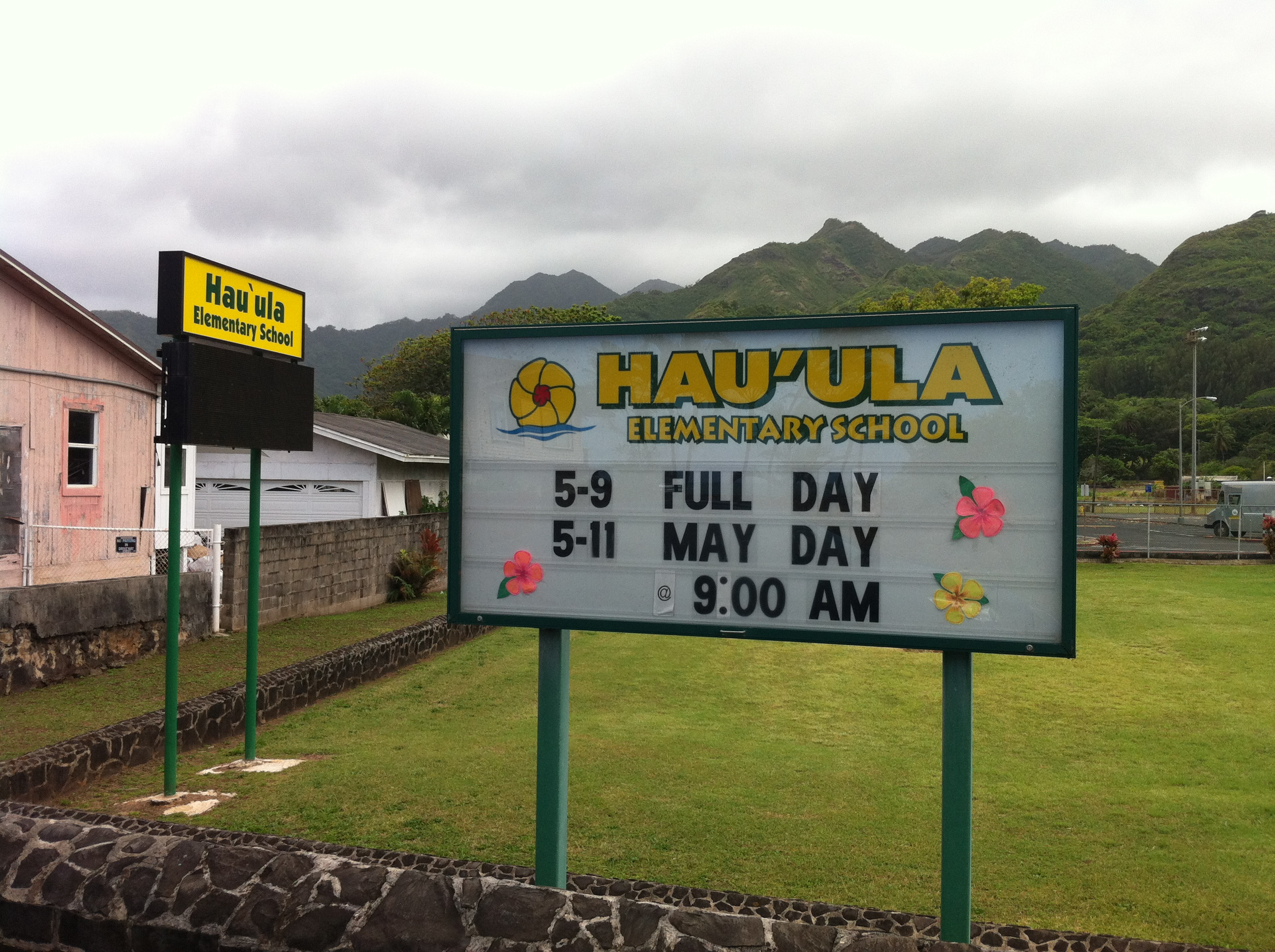
Hauʻula Elementary School

=== Public ===
School name	City	Grades	Establishment	Charter
Ahuimanu Elementary	Kaneohe	K-6	1973	
Alvah A. Scott Elementary	Aiea	K-6	1956	
ʻAiea Elementary	Aiea	K-6	1925	
ʻAikahi Elementary	Kailua	K-6	1960	
August Ahrens Elementary	Waipahu	K-6	1924	
Barbers Point Elementary	Kapolei	K-5	1954	
Blanche Pope Elementary	Waimanalo	K-6	1964	
Daniel K. Inouye Elementary	Wahiawa	K-5	1959	
Enchanted Lake Elementary	Kailua	K-6	1963	
Ewa Beach Elementary	Ewa Beach	K-6	1959	
Ewa Elementary	Ewa Beach	K-6	1922	
Gustav H. Webling Elementary	Aiea	K-6	1967	
Haleʻiwa Elementary	Haleiwa	K-6	1871	
Hauʻula Elementary	Hauula	K-6	1900	
Heʻeia Elementary	Kaneohe	K-6	1960	
Helemano Elementary	Wahiawa	K-5	1956	
Holomua Elementary	Ewa Beach	K-6	1995	
Honowai Elementary	Waipahu	K-6	1967	
Hoʻokele Elementary	Kapolei	K-5	2015	
Iliahi Elementary	Wahiawa	K-5	1963	
Iroquois Point Elementary	Ewa Beach	K-6	1960	
Ka Waihona o ka Naʻauao NCPCS	Waiʻanae	K-8	2001	charter
Kaʻaʻawa Elementary	Kaaawa	K-6	1904	
Kaʻala Elementary	Wahiawa	K-5	1958	
Kaʻelepulu Elementary	Kailua	K-6	1973	
Kahaluʻu Elementary	Kaneohe	K-6	1963	
Kahuku Elementary	Kahuku	K-6	1988	
Kailua Elementary	Kailua	K-6	1940	
Kaʻimiloa Elementary	Ewa Beach	K-6	1972	
Kainalu Elementary	Kailua	K-6	1954	
Kaleiʻopuʻu Elementary	Waipahu	K-6	1989	
Kamaile Academy PCS	Waianae	K-6	1989	charter
Kāneʻohe Elementary	Kaneohe	K-6	1956	
Kanoelani Elementary	Waipahu	K-6	1982	
Kaʻōhao PCS	Kailua	K-6	1963	charter
Kapolei Elementary	Kapolei	K-5	1993	
Kapunahala Elementary	Kaneohe	K-6	1962	
Ke Kula ʻo Samuel M. Kamakau Lab PCS	Kaneʻohe	K-12	2001	charter
Keolu Elementary	Kailua	K-6	1961	
Keoneʻula Elementary	Ewa Beach	K-6	2007	
Kipapa Elementary	Mililani	K-5	1932	
Lāʻie Elementary	Laie	K-6	1927	
Lehua Elementary	Pearl City	K-6	1965	
Leihoku Elementary	Waianae	K-6	1980	
Māʻili Elementary	Waianae	K-6	1963	
Major Sheldon Wheeler Elementary	Wahiawa	K-5	1926	
Makaha Elementary	Waianae	K-6	1960	
Makakilo Elementary	Kapolei	K-5	1968	
Manana Elementary	Pearl City	K-6	1969	
Mauka Lani Elementary	Kapolei	K-5	1973	
Maunawili Elementary	Kailua	K-6	1958	
Mililani ʻIke Elementary	Mililani	K-5	2004	
Mililani Mauka Elementary	Mililani	K-5	1993	
Mililani Uka Elementary	Mililani	K-5	1974	
Mililani Waena Elementary	Mililani	K-5	1971	
Mokapu Elementary	Kailua	K-6	1960	
Momilani Elementary	Pearl City	K-6	1972	
Nānāikapono Elementary	Waianae	K-6	1933	
Nānākuli Elementary	Waianae	K-6	1977	
Palisades Elementary	Pearl City	K-6	1965	
Pearl City Elementary	Pearl City	K-6	1956	
Pearl City Highlands Elementary	Pearl City	K-6		
Pearl Ridge Elementary	Aiea	K-6	1972	
Pohakea Elementary	Ewa Beach	K-6	1963	
Pūʻōhala Elementary	Kaneohe	K-6	1967	
Reverend Benjamin Parker Elementary	Kaneohe	K-6	1927	
Solomon Elementary	Wahiawa	K-5	1968	
Sunset Beach Elementary School	Haleiwa	K-6	1973	
Wahiawa Elementary	Wahiawa	K-5	1948	
Waiahole Elementary	Kaneohe	K-6	1883	
Waialua Elementary	Waialua	K-6	1966	
Waiʻanae Elementary	Waianae	K-6	1918	
Waiau Elementary	Pearl City	K-6	1974	
Waikele Elementary	Waipahu	K-6	1998	
Waimalu Elementary	Aiea	K-6	1960	
Waimānalo Elementary & Intermediate	Waimanalo	K-8	1925	
Waipahu Elementary	Waipahu	K-6	1918	

=== Private ===
- Honolulu Waldorf School, Kahala
- Le Jardin Academy, Kailua

== Niʻihau ==
School name	City	Grades	Establishment
Niʻihau High & Elementary	Waimea	K-12	1904

== Kauaʻi ==
=== Public ===
School name	City	Grades	Establishment	Charter
ʻEleʻele Elementary	Eleele	K-5	1911	
Elsie H. Wilcox Elementary	Lihue	K-5	1881	
Hanalei Elementary	Hanalei	K-6	1881	
Kalaheo Elementary	Kalaheo	K-5	1903	
Kanuikapono PCS	Anahola	K-12	2001	charter
Kapaʻa Elementary	Kapaa	K-5	1964	
Kawaikini NCPCS	Lihue	K-12	2008	charter
Ke Kula Niʻihau o Kekaha PCS	Kekaha	K-12	2001	charter
Kekaha Elementary	Kekaha	K-5	1888	
Kilauea Elementary	Kilauea	K-6	1921	
King Kaumualiʻi Elementary	Lihue	K-5	1990	
Koloa Elementary	Koloa	K-5	1877	
Kula Aupuni Niʻihau A Kahelelani Aloha	Makaweli	K-12	2001	charter

=== Private ===
- Island School, Līhuʻe
- Kahili Adventist School, Koloa

== Molokaʻi ==
School name	City	Grades	Establishment	Charter
Kaunakakai Elementary	Kaunakakai	K-6	1908	
Kilohana Elementary	Kaunakakai	K-6	1935	
Kualapuu Elementary NCPCCS	Kualapuu	K-6	1962	charter
Maunaloa Elementary	Maunaloa	K-6	1927	

== Lānaʻi ==
The only school in Lānaʻi is Lānaʻi High & Elementary School.

== Maui ==
=== Public ===
School name	City	Grades	Establishment	Charter
Haʻikū Elementary	Haiku	K-5	1920	
Hāna High and Elementary School	Hana	K-12	1912	
Kahului Elementary	Kahului	K-5	1960	
Kamaliʻi Elementary	Kihei	K-5	1996	
Kihei Elementary	Kihei	K-5	1977	
Kihei Charter	Kihei	K-12	2001	charter
*King Kamehameha III Elementary*	Lahaina	K-5	1957	
Kula Elementary	Kula	K-5	1964	
Lihikai Elementary	Kahului	K-5	1965	
Makawao Elementary	Makawao	K-5	1936	
Pāʻia Elementary	Paia	K-5	1908	
Pōmaikaʻi Elementary	Kahului	K-5	2007	
Princess Nāhiʻenaʻena Elementary	Lahaina	K-5	1988	
Puʻu Kukui Elementary	Wailuku	K-5	2013	
Pukalani Elementary	Pukalani	K-5	1976	
Waiheʻe Elementary	Wailuku	K-5	1879	
Wailuku Elementary	Wailuku	K-5	1904	

- King Kamehameha III Elementary School was destroyed as the result of the Maui Fires 2023 Hawaii wildfires

=== Private ===
- Kamehameha Schools Maui Campus, Pukalani
- Seabury Hall College Preparatory School, Makawao

== Big Island ==
=== Public ===
School name	City	Grades	Establishment	Charter
Chiefess Kapiʻolani Elementary	Hilo	K-6	1922	
Connections PCS	Hilo	K-10	2000	charter
Ernest Bowen de Silva Elementary	Hilo	K-6	1959	
Haʻaheo Elementary	Hilo	K-6	1900	
Hawaii Academy of Arts & Science PCS	Pahoa	K-12	2001	charter
Hilo Union	Hilo	K-6	1912	
Holualoa Elementary	Holualoa	K-5	1896	
Honaunau Elementary	Captain Cook	K-5	1901	
Honokaʻa Elementary	Honokaa	K-6	1889	
Hoʻokena Elementary	Captain Cook	K-5	1931	
Innovations PCS	Kailua-Kona	K-8	2001	charter
Ka ʻUmeke Kāʻeo PCS	Hilo	K-6	2001	charter
Kahakai Elementary	Kailua-Kona	K-5	1982	
Kanu o ka ʻĀina New Century PCS	Kamuela	K-12	2000	charter
Kaʻū High and Pāhala Elementary	Pahala	K-12	1881	
Kaʻūmana Elementary	Hilo	K-6	1904	
Ke Kula ʻo ʻEhunuikaimalino	Kealakekua	K-12		
Ke Kula ʻo Nāwahīokalaniʻōpuʻu Iki Lab PCS	Keaʻau	K-6	2001	charter
Keaʻau Elementary	Keaʻau	K-5	1998	
Kealakehe Elementary	Kailua-Kona	K-5	1968	
Keaukaha Elementary	Hilo	K-6	1930	
Keonepoko Elementary	Pahoa	K-6	1991	
Kohala Elementary	Kapaau	K-5	1901	
Kona Pacific PCS		K-5	2008	charter
Konawaena Elementary	Kealakekua	K-5	1963	
Laupāhoehoe High & Elementary School	Laupahoehoe	K-12	1904	
Mountain View Elementary	Mountain View	K-5	1902	
Nā Wai Ola PCS	Kurtistown	K-12	2000	charter
Naʻalehu School	Naalehu	K-6	1928	
Paʻauilo Elementary & Intermediate	Paauilo	K-9	1951	
Pahoa Elementary	Pahoa	K-6	1910	
Prince Jonah Kūhiō Kalanianaʻole Elementary & Intermediate	Papaikou	K-8	1884	
Volcano School Arts/Sciences PCS	Volcano	K-8	2001	charter
Waiākea Elementary	Hilo	K-5	1963	
Waiākeawaena Elementary	Hilo	K-5	1909	
Waikoloa Elementary & Middle	Waikoloa	K-8	1994	
Waimea Elementary	Kamuela	K-5	1966	

=== Private ===
- Hawaii Academy of Arts and Sciences, Pahoa
- Hawaiʻi Preparatory Academy, Kamuela
- Hualalai Academy, Kailua Kona
- Kamehameha Schools Hawaii Campus, Keaʻau
- Ke Kula ʻo Nāwahīokalaniʻōpuʻu, Keaʻau
- Kona Christian Academy, Kailua Kona
- Parker School, Kamuela
- St. Joseph School (Hilo, Hawaii), Hilo

== See also ==
- List of high schools in Hawaii
- List of middle schools in Hawaii
- Hawaiʻi State Department of Education, sole centralized school district for the state
