= List of middle schools in Hawaii =

This is a list of middle schools in the U.S. state of Hawaii.

== Honolulu ==
=== Public ===
School name	City	Grades	Establishment	Charter
Aliamanu Intermediate School	Honolulu	7-8	1958	
Central Middle School	Honolulu	6-8	1926	
Hālau Kū Māna NCPCS	Honolulu	6-12	2000	Charter
Jarrett Middle School	Honolulu	6-8	1955	
Kaimukī Middle School	Honolulu	6-8	1939	
Ke Kula Kaiapuni ʻo Ānuenue	Honolulu	K-12	1958	Charter
King David Kalākaua Middle School	Honolulu	6-8	1928	
Moanalua Middle School	Honolulu	7-8	1967	
Niu Valley Middle School	Honolulu	6-8	1955	
Prince David Kawananakoa Middle School	Honolulu	6-8	1927	
Robert Louis Stevenson Middle School	Honolulu	6-8	1937	
Sanford B. Dole Middle School	Honolulu	6-8	1955	
Washington Middle School	Honolulu	6-8	1854	

=== Private ===
- Damien Memorial School, Honolulu
- Hawaii Baptist Academy, Honolulu
- ʻIolani School, Honolulu
- Kamehameha Schools, Honolulu
- Maryknoll School, Honolulu
- Mid-Pacific Institute, Honolulu
- Punahou School, Honolulu
- Sacred Hearts Academy, Honolulu
- Saint Louis School, Honolulu

== Greater Oʻahu ==
=== Public ===
School name	City	Grades	Establishment	Charter
Aiea Intermediate School	ʻAiea	7-8	1963	
Ewa Makai Middle School	ʻEwa Beach	6-8	2011	
Honouliuli Middle School	ʻEwa Beach	6-8	2020	
Hakipuʻu Learning Center	Kāneʻohe	7-12	2001	Charter
Highlands Intermediate School	Pearl City	7-8	1959	
Ilima Intermediate School	ʻEwa Beach	7-8	1967	2017
Kahuku High & Intermediate School	Kahuku	7-12	1914	
Kailua Intermediate School	Kailua	7-8	1958	
Kapolei Middle School	Kapolei	6-8	1999	
Mililani Middle School	Mililani	6-8	1998	
Nānākuli High & Intermediate School	Waiʻanae	7-12	1967	
Olomana High & Intermediate School	Kailua	7-12		
Samuel Wilder King Intermediate School	Kāneʻohe	7-8	1964	
Wahiawa Middle School	Wahiawā	6-8	1960	
Waiʻanae Intermediate School	Waiʻanae	7-8	1966	
Waialua High & Intermediate School	Waialua	7-12	1924	
Waimānalo Elementary & Intermediate	Waimānalo	K-8	1925	
Waipahu Intermediate School	Waipahu	7-8	1966	
Wheeler Middle School	Wahiawā	6-8	1968	

=== Private ===
- Honolulu Waldorf School, Kahala
- Le Jardin Academy, Kailua

== Niʻihau ==
School name	City	Grades	Establishment
Niʻihau High & Elementary	Waimea	K-12	1904

== Kauaʻi ==
=== Public ===
School name	City	Grades	Establishment
Chiefess Kamakahelei Middle School	Līhuʻe	6-8	2000
Kapaʻa Middle School	Kapaʻa	6-8	1997
Waimea Canyon Middle School	Waimea	6-8	1972

=== Private ===
- Island School, Līhuʻe
- Kahili Adventist School, Koloa

== Molokaʻi ==
School name	City	Grades	Establishment
Molokai Intermediate School	Hoʻolehua	7-8	2004

== Lānaʻi ==
The only school in Lānaʻi is Lānaʻi High & Elementary School.

== Maui ==
=== Public ===
School name	City	Grades	Establishment
Hāna High and Elementary School	Hāna	K-12	1912
King Kekaulike High School	Pukalani	9-12	1995
Iao Intermediate School	Wailuku	6-8	1928
Kalama Intermediate School	Makawao	6-8	1985
Lahaina Intermediate School	Lāhainā	6-8	1978
Lokelani Intermediate School	Kīhei	6-8	1988
Maui Waena Intermediate School	Kahului	6-8	1989

=== Private ===
- Seabury Hall College Preparatory School, Makawao
- Kamehameha Schools Maui Campus, Pukalani

== Big Island ==
=== Public ===
School name	City	Grades	Establishment	Charter
Hilo Intermediate School	Hilo	7-8	1929	
Honokaʻa High & Intermediate School	Honokaʻa	7-12	1889	
Kanu o ka ʻĀina New Century Public Charter School	Kamuela	K-12	2000	charter
Kaʻū High & Pāhala Elementary School	Pāhala	K-12	1881	
Ke Ana Laʻahana Public Charter School	Hilo	7-12	2001	charter
Ke Kula ʻo ʻEhunuikaimalino	Kealakekua	K-12		
Keaʻau Middle School	Keaʻau	6-8	1902	
Kealakehe Intermediate School	Kailua-Kona	6-8	1986	
Kohala Middle School	Kapaʻau	6-8	1926	
Konawaena Middle School	Kealakekua	6-8	1991	
Kua O Ka Lā New Century Public Charter School	Pāhoa	6-11	2001	charter
Laupāhoehoe High & Elementary School	Laupāhoehoe	K-12	1904	
Paʻauilo Elementary & Intermediate School	Paʻauilo	K-9	1951	
Pahoa High and Intermediate School	Pāhoa	7-12	1910	
Prince Jonah Kūhiō Kalanianaʻole Elementary & Intermediate School	Papaikou	K-8	1884	
Waiākea Intermediate School	Hilo	6-8	1961	
Waikoloa Middle School	Waikōloa Village	6-8	2008	
Waimea Middle PCS	Kamuela	6-8	2003	charter
West Hawaiʻi Explorations Academy Public Charter School	Kailua-Kona	7-12	2000	charter

=== Private ===
- Hawaii Academy of Arts and Sciences, Pāhoa
- Hawaiʻi Preparatory Academy, Kamuela
- Hualalai Academy, Kailua Kona
- Kamehameha Schools Hawaii Campus, Keaʻau
- Ke Kula ʻo Nāwahīokalaniʻōpuʻu, Keaʻau
- Parker School, Kamuela
- St. Joseph Junior/Senior High School, Hilo

== See also ==
- List of high schools in Hawaii
- List of elementary schools in Hawaii
- Hawaiʻi State Department of Education, sole centralized school district for the state
