= Hawaiʻi Kai, Hawaii =

Neighborhood in East Honolulu CDP, Hawaii, United States

Coordinates: 21.288°N 157.704°W

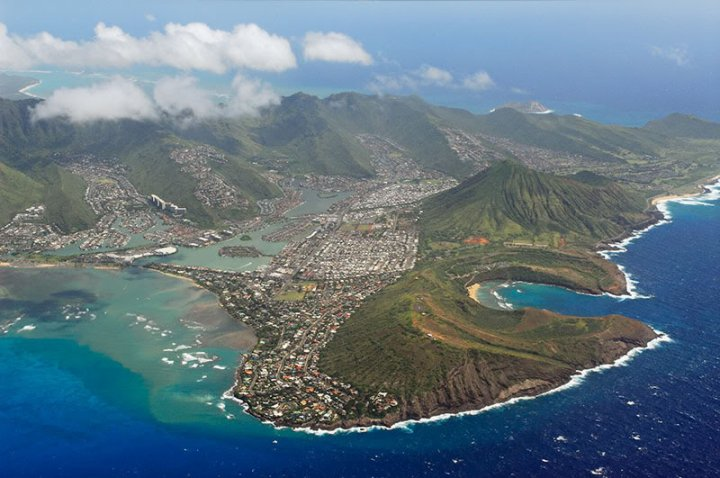
Aerial view of Maunalua (Hawaii Kai) and Koko Head

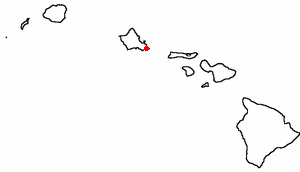
Location of Maunalua (Hawaiʻi Kai), Hawaiʻi

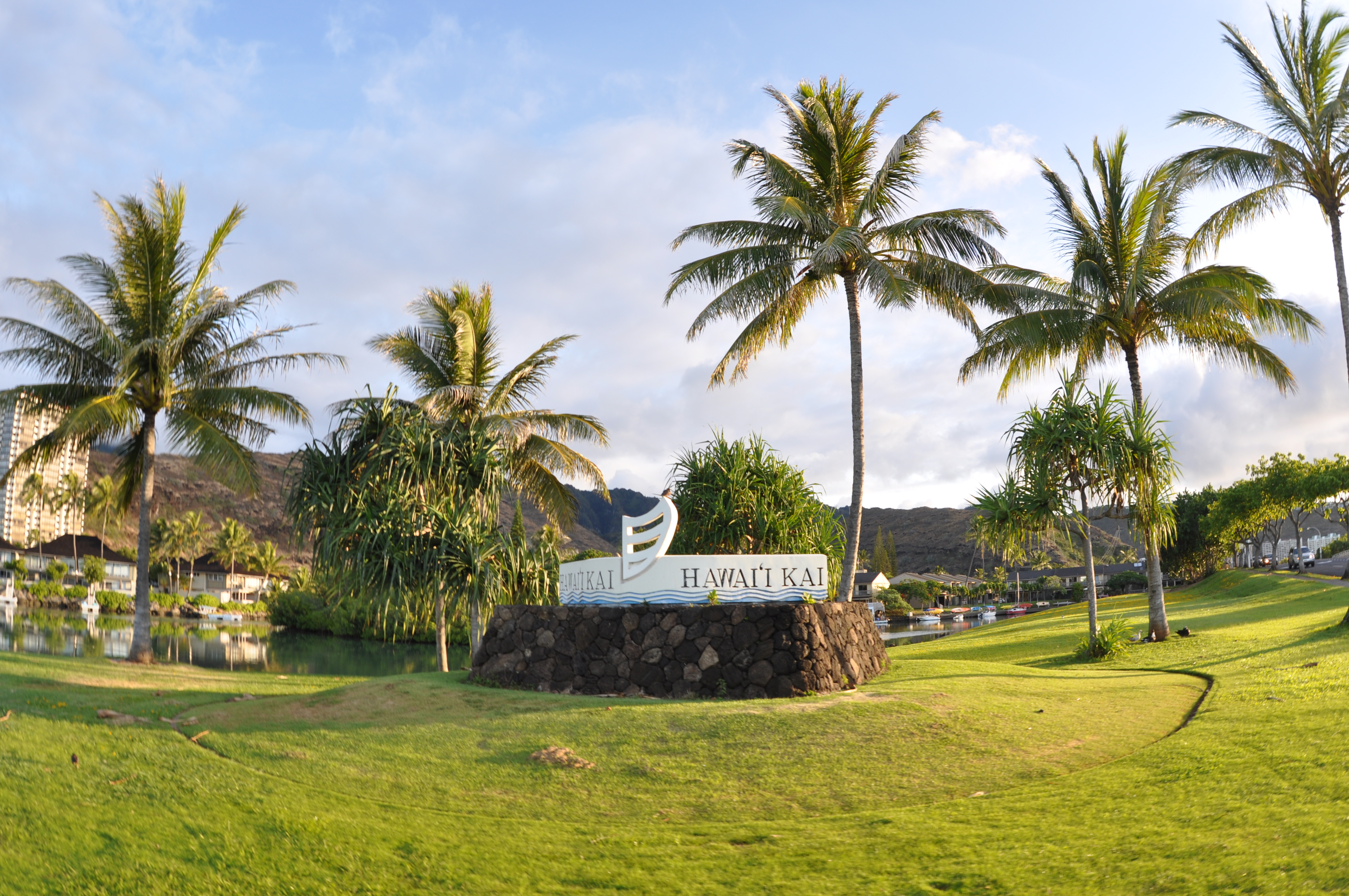
Hawaiʻi Kai

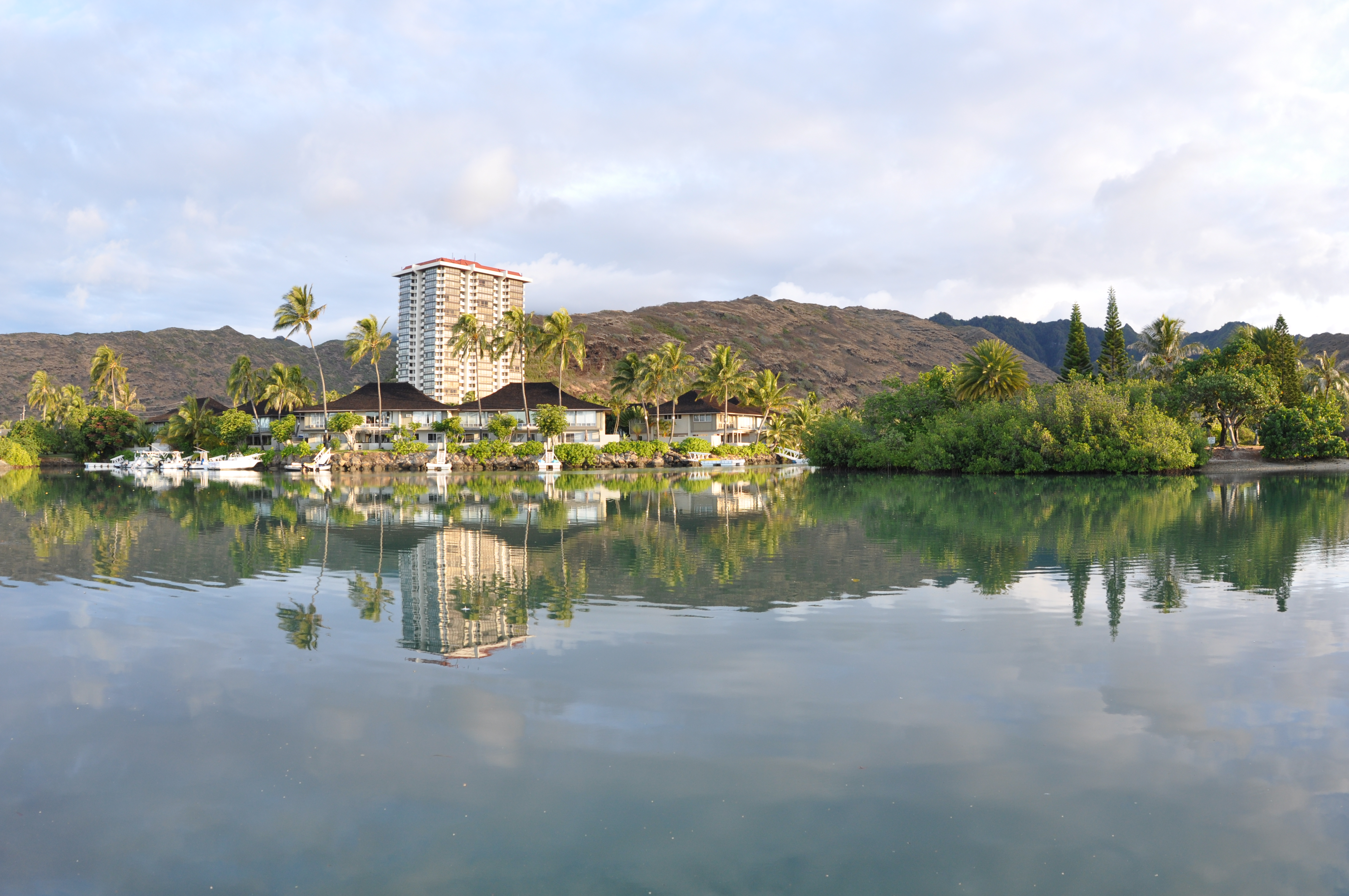
Hawaiʻi Kai at Sunrise

Hawaiʻi Kai, also known as Maunalua or Koko Marina, is a largely residential area located in the Honolulu, in the East Honolulu CDP, on the island of Oʻahu. Hawaiʻi Kai is the largest of several communities at the eastern end of the island. The area was largely developed by Henry J. Kaiser around the ancient Maunalua fishpond and wetlands area known as Kuapā (meaning "fishpond wall"). Hawaiʻi Kai was dredged from Kuapā Pond starting around 1959. Dredging not only transformed the shallow coastal inlet and wetlands into a marine embayment, but was accompanied by considerable filling and clearing of the pond margins. In 1961, Kaiser-Aetna entered into a lease agreement with the land owner, the Bernice Pauahi Bishop Estate, to develop the 521 acre (2.11 km^{2}) fishpond into residential tracts with a marina and channels separated by fingers of land and islands upon which house lots and commercial properties would be laid out and developed. Nearly all of the low-lying lands surrounding the marina have since been developed, and neighborhoods now extend back into the several valleys and up the separating ridges.

== Geography ==
Immediately west of Hawaiʻi Kai along Kalanianaʻole Highway (State Rte. 72) is the East Honolulu neighborhood of Kuliʻouʻou. Eastward from Hawaiʻi Kai (Maunalua) on the same highway is the Koko Head area, an area now mostly included within Koko Head Park. South of Hawaiʻi Kai is Maunalua Bay, and north are the Koʻolau mountains. Eventually the road crosses over to the windward side near Makapuʻu Point.

Hawaiʻi Kai is located approximately 12 miles (19 km) east of the Central Business District (CBD) of Honolulu.

In the 2000 U.S. census the U.S. Census Bureau defined Hawaiʻi Kai as being in the urban Honolulu census-designated place. In the 2010 U.S. census, the bureau created a new census-designated place, East Honolulu, which Hawaiʻi Kai currently resides in.

== Native Hawaiian fishpond ==
Maunalua Bay was formerly renown for having the largest Native Hawaiian fishpond on Oʻahu. The 523 acre fishpond known as Keahupua-O-Maunalua had a wall or kuapā which originally spanned from Kuliʻouʻou headland to what is now Portlock. The pond was used primarily to raise mullet (ʻawaʻawa) and was also home to many endemic or indigenous waterbirds. The area remained important for fishing and agriculture until the 1950s when the fishpond was filled for housing development.

== Communities ==
Kalama Valley is a community within the town of Maunalua, more commonly known as Hawaiʻi Kai located on the eastern coast of the island of Oʻahu. It features a shopping center, a public park and basketball facilities, and predominantly single-family, relatively high-priced housing, due to its location in Hawaiʻi Kai. There are a variety of attractions in the vicinity of Kalama Valley, including Hawaiʻi Kai Golf Course, Awawamalu (Sandy Beach), Makapuʻu Lighthouse and beach, Koko Crater Botanical Garden, the "From Here to Eternity" cove, and Hanauma Bay.

"Kamehame Ridge" is a ridge located in the middle of Kalama and Kamilo Iki Valley. Kamehame Ridge was developed during the 1990s. Now there are multi-million dollars homes and real estate stretching from the bottom to the top of the Ridge. It is most famous for its popular hike, known locally as “Dead Man’s Catwalk”.

== Demographics ==
Hawaiʻi Kai was home to 30,079 residents residing in 10,702 households during the period between 2009–2013. The percentage of residents 25 and older with a bachelor's degree or higher was 51.8 percent.

== Education ==
Maunalua is located within the Hawaiʻi Department of Education Kaiser Complex and is home to Henry J. Kaiser High, Hahaʻione Elementary, Kamiloiki Elementary, and Koko Head Elementary Schools. The three elementary schools feed into Niu Valley Middle School, which in turn feeds into Kaiser High, although Niu Valley Middle is not located in Hawaiʻi Kai.

The Hawaii State Public Library System operates the Hawaii Kai Public Library. It opened on December 1, 1973.

== See also ==
- Kalama Valley protests

== Gallery ==
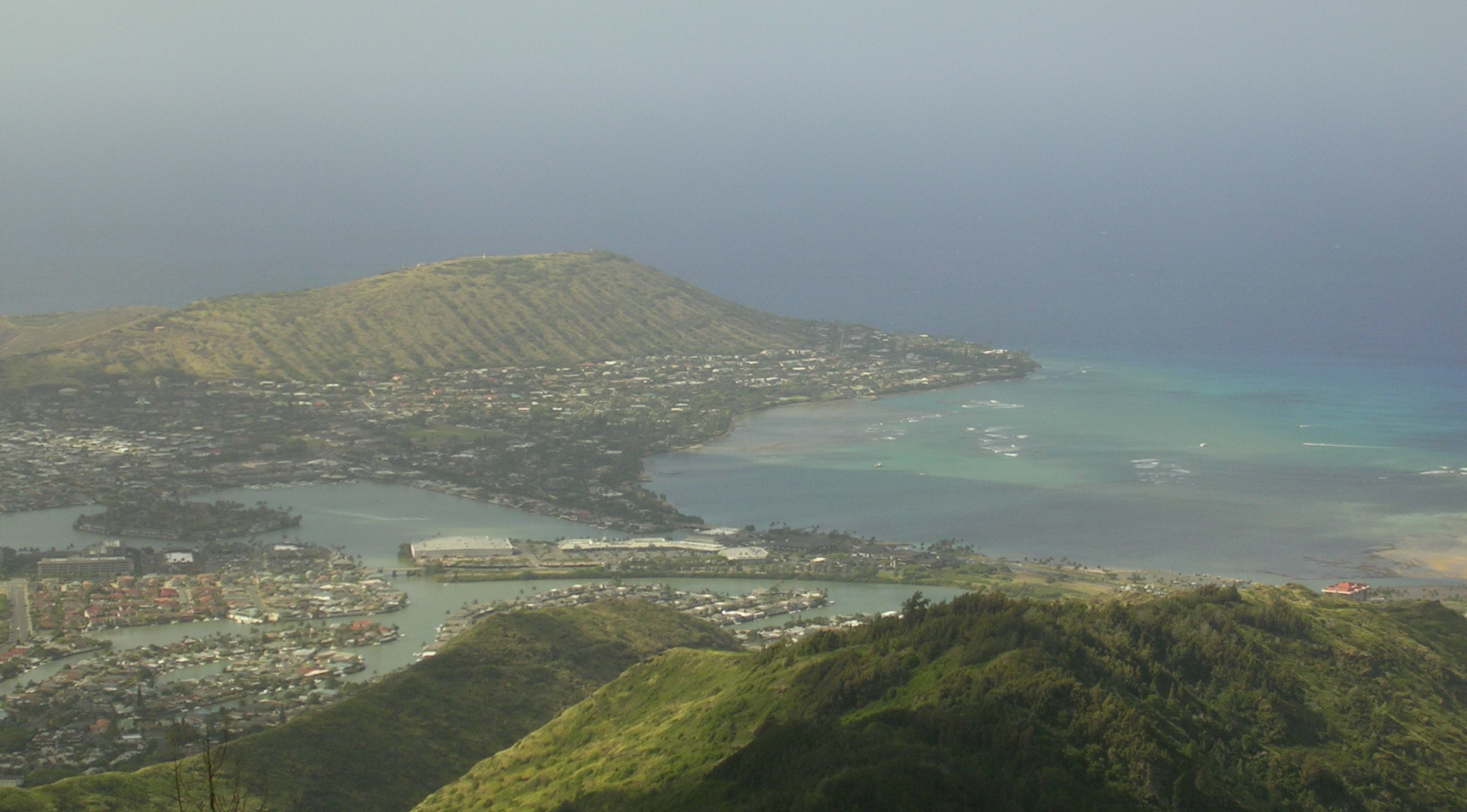
Hawaiʻi Kai and the Hanauma Crater

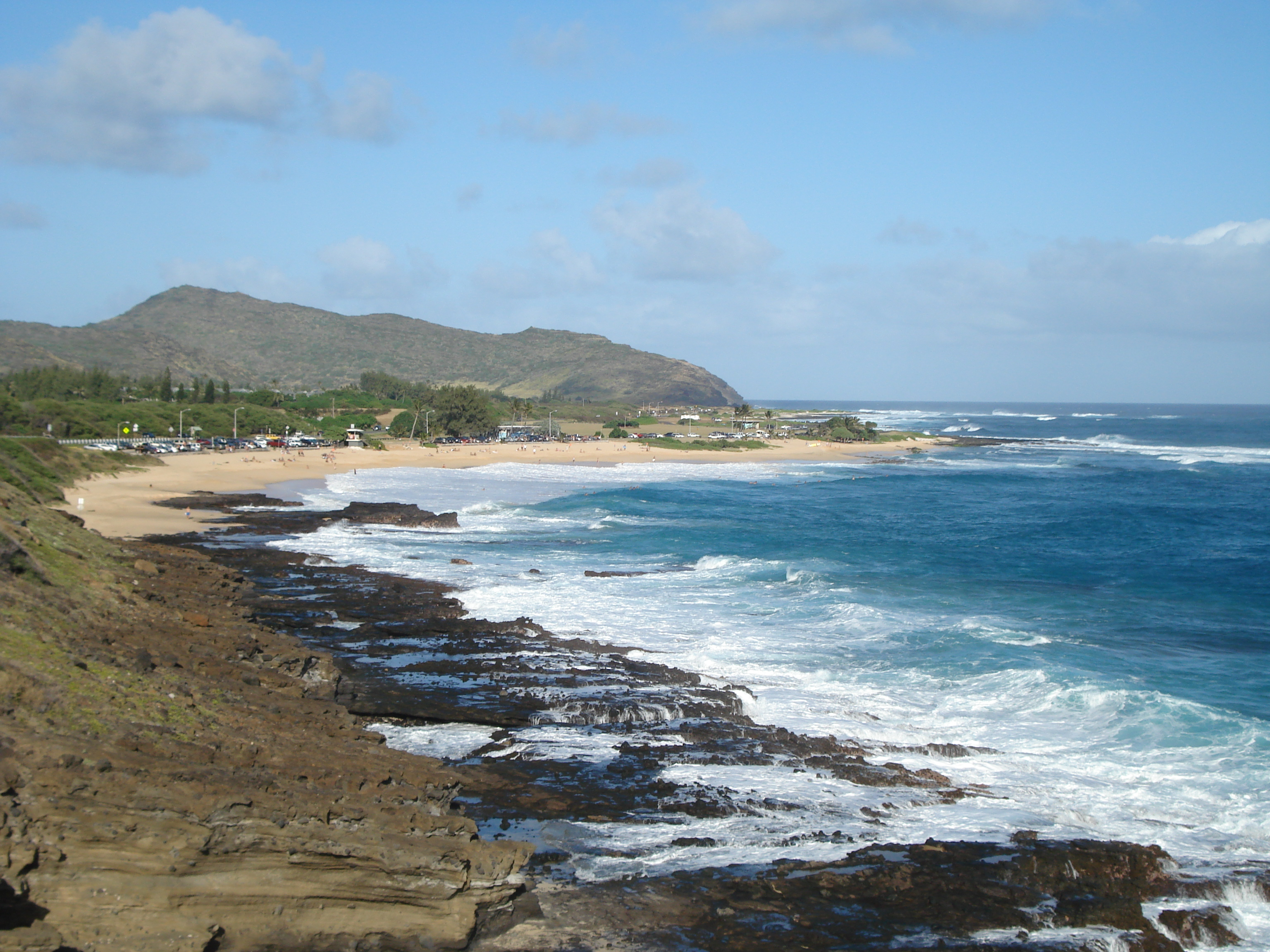
Hawaiʻi Kai's Sandy Beach

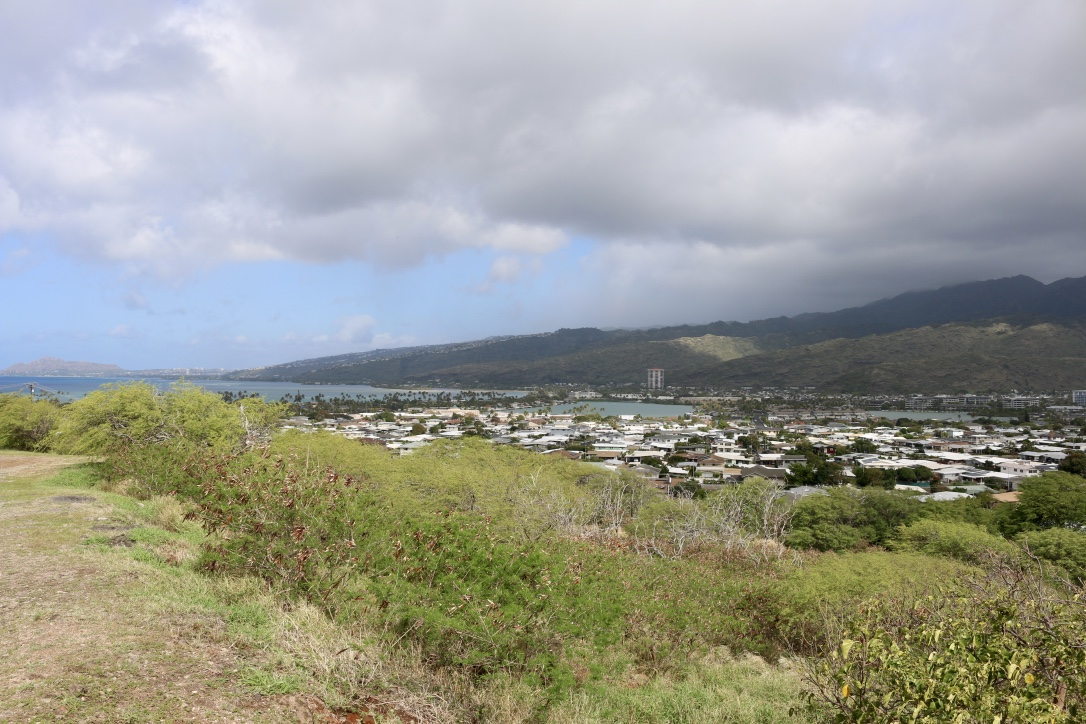
The view of Hawaiʻi Kai from the nearby lookout point.

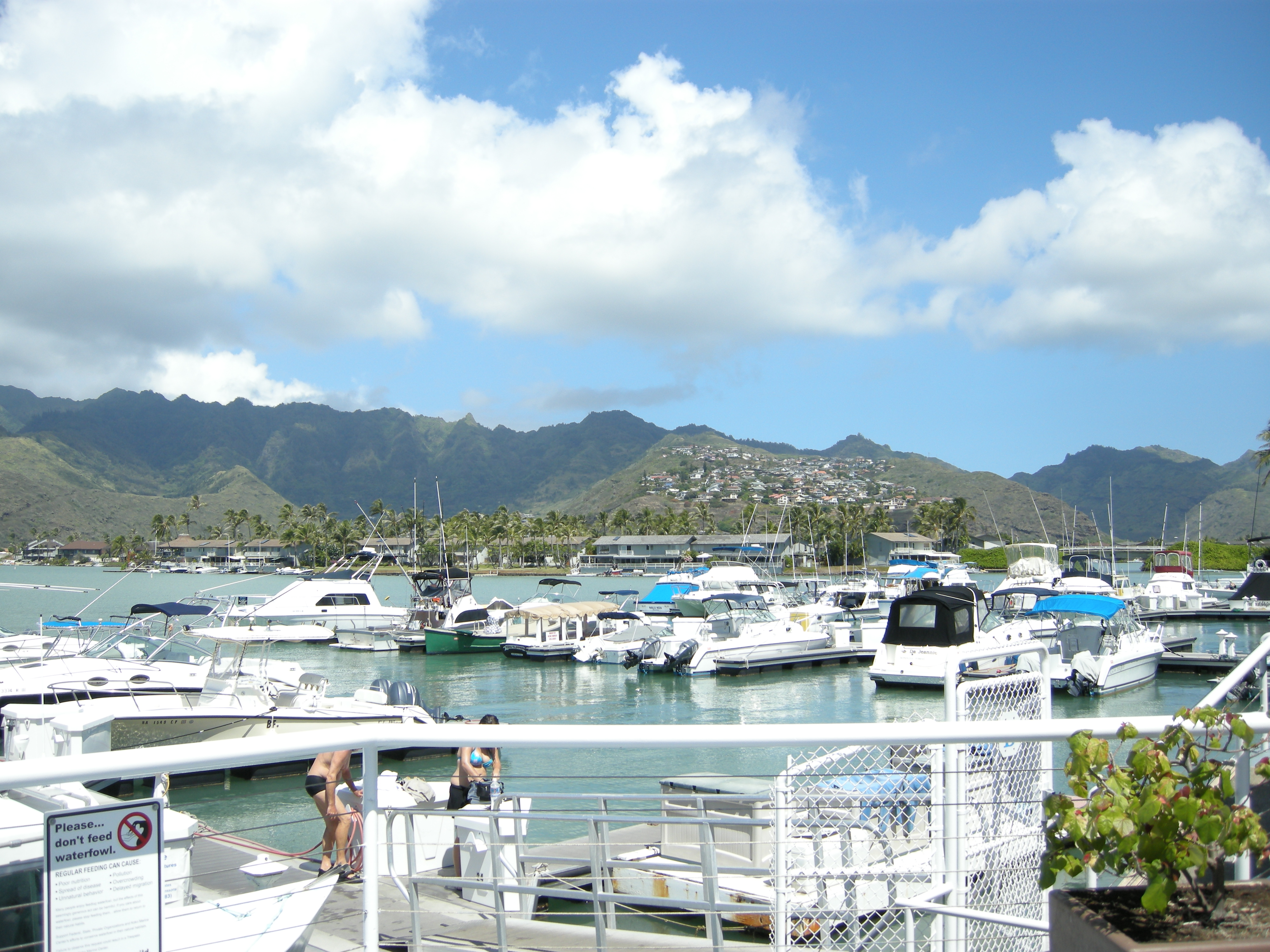
Marina in Hawaiʻi Kai
