= East Honolulu, Hawaii =

Census-designated place in Hawaii, United States

East Honolulu
- Census-designated place
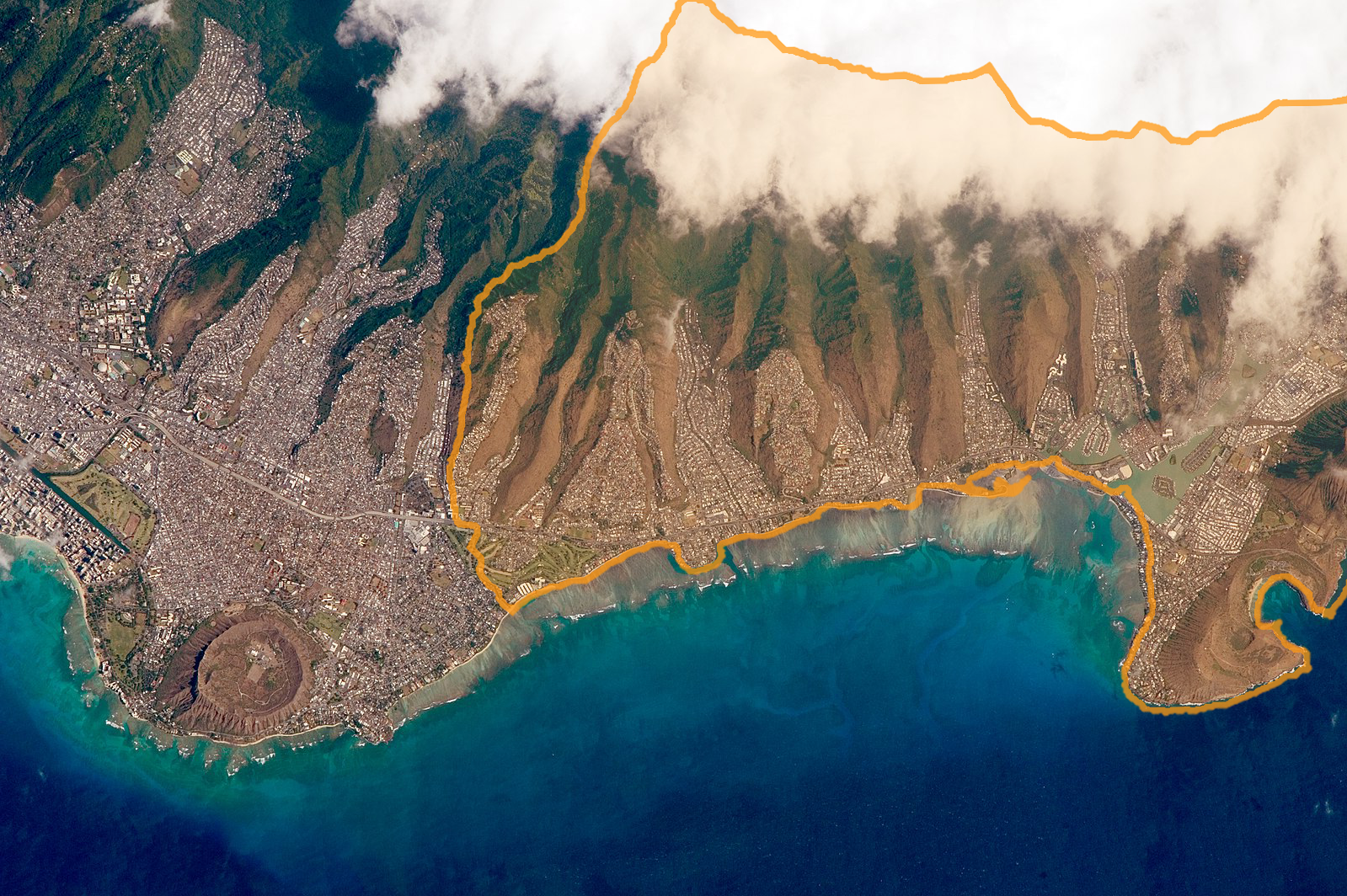
- Coordinates: 21°17′20″N 157°43′2″W
- Country: United States
- State: Hawaii
- Counties: Honolulu

Area
  - Total: 34.46 sq mi (89.24 km^{2})
  - Land: 23.00 sq mi (59.58 km^{2})
  - Water: 11.45 sq mi (29.65 km^{2})

Population (2020)
  - Total: 50,922
  - Density: 2,213.4/sq mi (854.61/km^{2})
- Time zone: UTC-10
- Area code: 808
- GNIS feature ID: 2583416

East Honolulu is a census-designated place (CDP) in Honolulu County, Hawaii, United States. As of the 2020 census, the CDP had a population of 50,922, making it the 2nd most populated CDP in Hawaii, behind Honolulu.

== Geography ==
East Honolulu is centered on 21°17′20″N 157°43′2″W (21.2891, -157.7173). According to the United States Census Bureau, the CDP has an area of 3.4 square miles (8.9 km^{2}), of which 2.3 square miles (6.0 km^{2}) is land and 1.2 square miles (3.0 km^{2}), or 33.22%, is water.

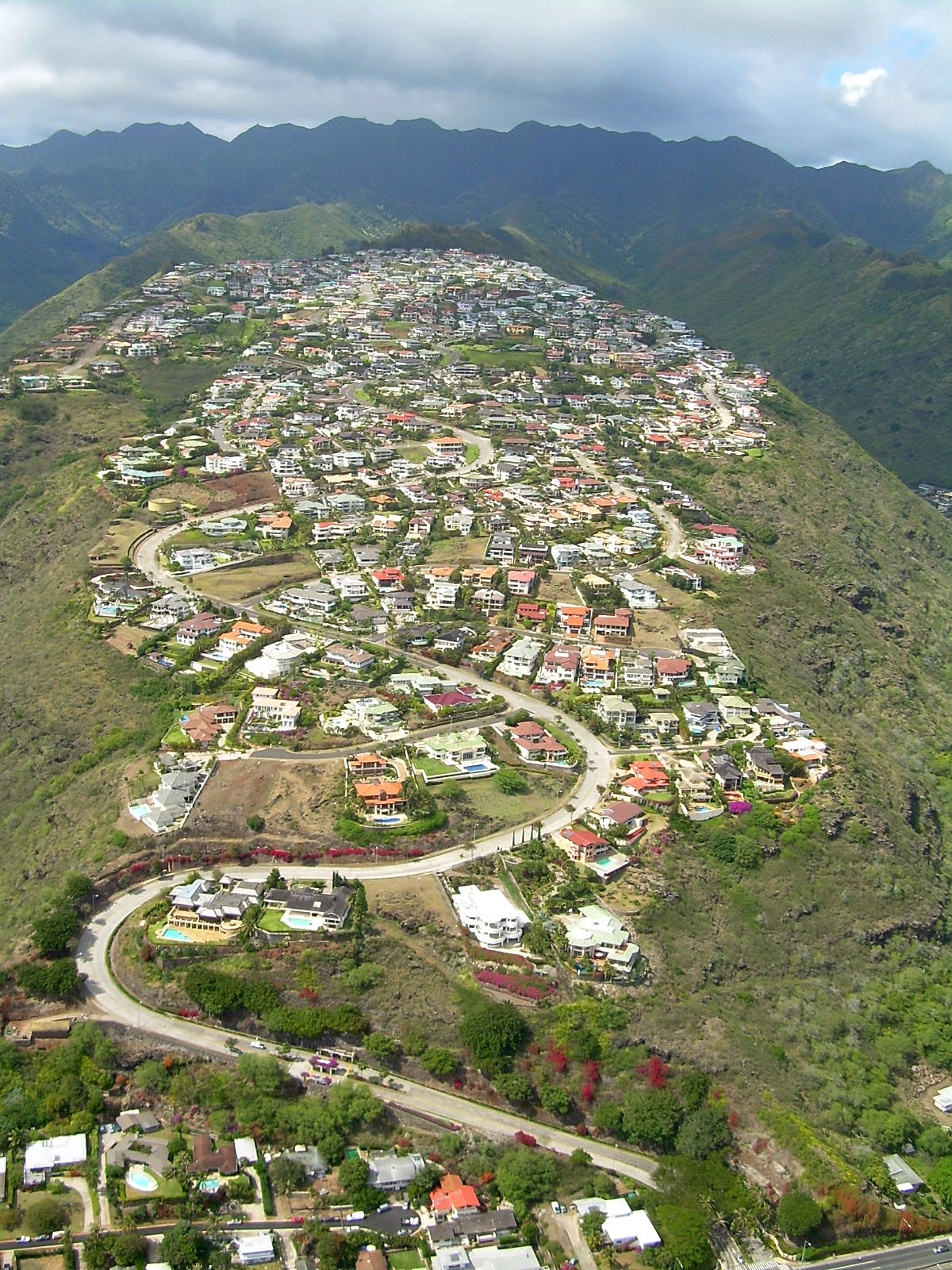
Puuikena Drive in East Honolulu

East Honolulu consists of the area directly east of the center of Honolulu, beginning at the Wai'alae Country Club and extending east to Makapuʻu Point, the easternmost point on the island of Oahu. It consists of mostly upscale neighborhoods.

Areas:

- ʻĀina Haina
- Hawaiʻi Kai
- Niu Valley

== Demographics ==
Historical population
Census	Pop.	Note	%±
2010	49,914		—
2020	50,922		2.0%
U.S. Decennial Census

=== 2020 census ===
As of the 2020 census, East Honolulu had a population of 50,922. The median age was 50.3 years. 4.2% of residents were under the age of 5, 18.2% were under the age of 18, and 27.6% were 65 years of age or older. For every 100 females there were 95.5 males, and for every 100 females age 18 and over there were 92.7 males age 18 and over.

The population density was 2,213.4 people per square mile. 100.0% of residents lived in urban areas, while 0.0% lived in rural areas.

There were 18,400 households in East Honolulu, of which 29.3% had children under the age of 18 living in them. Of all households, 60.8% were married-couple households, 13.1% were households with a male householder and no spouse or partner present, and 21.8% were households with a female householder and no spouse or partner present. About 18.6% of all households were made up of individuals and 11.3% had someone living alone who was 65 years of age or older.

There were 20,159 housing units, of which 8.7% were vacant. The homeowner vacancy rate was 1.7% and the rental vacancy rate was 10.0%.

Racial composition as of the 2020 census
Race	Number	Percent
White	12,276	24.1%
Black or African American	307	0.6%
American Indian and Alaska Native	67	0.1%
Asian	24,242	47.6%
Native Hawaiian and Other Pacific Islander	1,484	2.9%
Some other race	448	0.9%
Two or more races	12,098	23.8%
Hispanic or Latino (of any race)	2,767	5.4%

== Education ==
Hawaii Department of Education operates area public schools.

Elementary schools:

- Aina Haina Elementary School
- Haha'ione Elementary School
- Kamilo'iki Elementary School
- Koko Head Elementary School

Middle schools:

- Niu Valley Middle School

High schools:

- Henry J. Kaiser High School
- Kalani High School

Private schools:

- Holy Nativity School
- Honolulu Waldorf School

Hawaii State Public Library System maintains the Aina Haina Public Library, and the Hawaii Kai Public Library.
