= Henry J. Kaiser High School (Hawaii) =

High school located in Hawaii

Coordinates: 21°17′8″N 157°41′43″W

Location
- 511 Lunalilo Home Road; Honolulu, Hawaii 96725; United States

Information
- Type: Public, Co-educational
- Established: 1971
- Founder: Henry J. Kaiser
- School district: Hawaii Department of Education
- NCES School ID: 150003000228
- Principal: Mr. Justin Mew
- Teaching staff: 63.00 (FTE)
- Grades: 9-12
- Enrollment: 1,088 (2023-2024)
- Student to teacher ratio: 17.27
- Campus: Suburban
- Colors: Blue and Gold
- Athletics: Oahu Interscholastic Association
- Mascot: Cougar
- Rival: Kalani High School
- Accreditation: Western Association of Schools and Colleges
- Newspaper: The Cougar Connection
- Yearbook: Uli A Me Kula
- Military: United States Air Force JROTC
- Distinctions: International Baccalaureate World School
- Website: www.kaiserhighschoolhawaii.org/

Henry J. Kaiser High School is a four-year public high school located in Hawaiʻi in the East Honolulu community of Hawaiʻi Kai. It is accredited by the Western Association of Schools and Colleges (WASC).

== Basic information ==
Named after industrialist and philanthropist Henry J. Kaiser (who founded the Honolulu community of Hawaiʻi Kai), the school opened its doors in 1971, four years after Henry J. Kaiser's death. Although enrollment has fluctuated throughout the years along with changing community demographics, the school currently serves approximately 1,100 students in grades 9–12. The school's mascot is the Cougar and the school colors are blue and gold.

The Kaiser complex, to which Kaiser High belongs, also includes ʻĀina Haina Elementary, Hahaʻione Elementary, Kamiloiki Elementary, Koko Head Elementary, and Niu Valley Middle School.

With a graduation rate of 88.0% in 2013, the majority of students successfully complete high school; however, a noticeable percentage of the student body failed to do so. Compared to the Hawaii Department Of Education district, Henry J Kaiser High School has achieved a higher graduation rate by about 6%. Moreover, relative to the Hawaii average graduation rate, this school is ahead by 6%.

In the 2000 U.S. census the U.S. Census Bureau defined Kaiser High as being in the urban Honolulu census-designated place. For the 2010 U.S. census the bureau created a new census-designated place, East Honolulu.

== Campus ==
Kaiser is situated in Hawaiʻi Kai, a small upper-middle class suburban community in East Honolulu on the island of Oʻahu. The open-air campus, built on a series of hills has six multi-story classroom buildings. Additional buildings include a number of trailers, an office, library, cafeteria, gymnasium, track, football/soccer field, baseball/softball field, tennis courts, and swimming pool. The driveway leading up to the school is lined with large palm trees, a distinctive feature of the campus. Koko Crater, a dormant volcano, rises up near its east side and is featured on its seal.

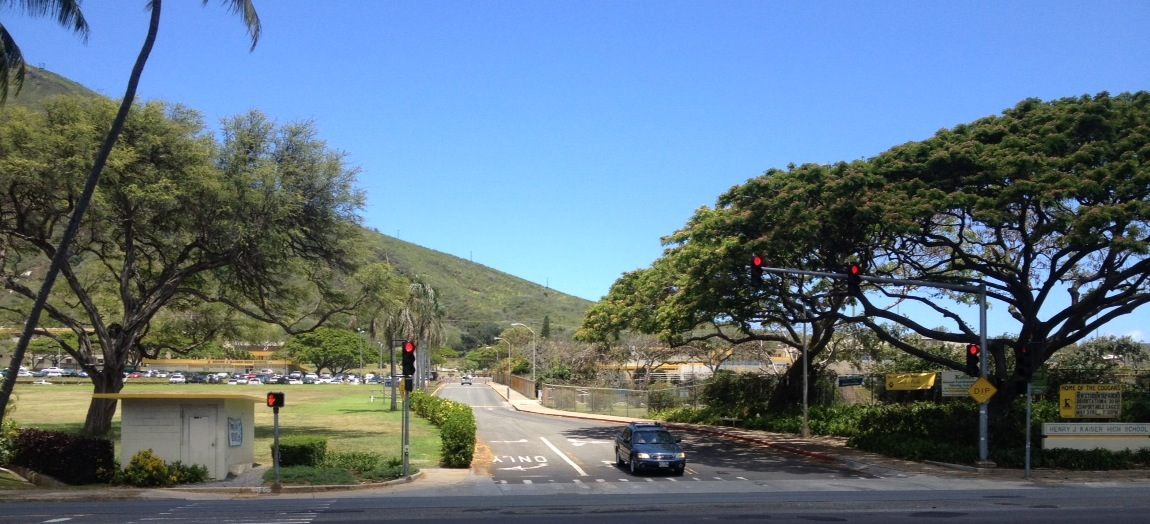
Entrance to Henry J. Kaiser High School

== Curriculum ==
The school's curriculum emphasizes college preparation and incorporates the Hawaiʻi Content and Performance Standards as well as national content standards.

Notable aspects of the school include: a School Community Council; comprehensive athletic and non-athletic co-curricular activities, the latter particularly focusing on community service; student government and leadership classes; an athletic complex, serving both the local community and the state; a Communications Arts & Technology learning center; Project Hoʻolokahi, a program working in conjunction with the Polynesian Voyaging Society; Air Force Junior Reserve Officers' Training Corps; AP and Honors courses; a music program, the Kaiser Cougars Band (consisting of both marching and symphonic band) and Orchestra; a four-year Guidance Program (KAP); and a code-of-conduct and attendance policy.

The school has been approved as an International Baccalaureate World School since 2011. This approval supports the International Baccalaureate Middle-Years Programme and the Diploma Programme. The Middle-Years Programme is a 5-year program (grades 6-10) continued from Niu Valley Middle School. Students finish a personal project upon completion of the Middle-Years Programme. This school only offers IBDP classes to students intending to obtain the full diploma. Students may not take a mixture of regular classes and IBDP classes (other than the one elective offered to all IBDP students at this school).

This school manages the Advancement Via Individual Determination (AVID) program as an elective course for the student who has a GPA between 2.0 and 3.5. The 8th to 12th grader can take an Advancement Via Individual Determination class, and it is driven by the WICOR method, which stands for Writing, Inquiry, Collaboration, Organization and Reading.

== Current Principal ==
Justin S. N. Mew has a master's degree from University of Hawaiʻi at Mānoa. He was awarded the Hawaii Middle School Principal of the Year in 2011. He received the Outstanding Library Service Award School Administrators Honoree.

== The performances of the students ==
The students showed the average score 3.1 in reading and the average score 2.6 in mathematics. The percentage of proficient disadvantaged students are 57.8 of total disadvantaged students. The gap between disadvantaged and Non-disadvantaged students is -13.6.

The students' Advanced Placement (AP) participation rate is 34% of total number of the students, and the participant passing rate is 44%. The exam pass rate is 37%, and quality adjusted participation rate is 15%. The students' International Baccalaureate Diploma Programme (IBDP) participation rate is 19%, exam pass rate is 52%, and IB Diploma rate is 35%.

(Data based on the 2013–14 school year)

== Athletics ==
The school participates in the Oahu Interscholastic Association for athletics. The football program has had a number of coaches begin their coaching careers here, such as Kim McCloud, Brian Ah Yat, and Joe Seumalo. Notable head coaches also include Kaiser alumnus Rich Miano, and former Weber State standout Cameron Higgins. The football program caught the national eye in 2017 when they cancelled their season after tensions between parents and Kaiser head coach Arnold Martinez led to altercations at both the school and Martinez's home. Martinez resigned a week later.

== Notable alumni ==
Listed alphabetically by last name (year of graduation):

- Wayne Besen, journalist and LGBTQ rights advocate
- Darin Brooks (2002), television actor best known for his roles as Max Brady on Days of Our Lives, and as Alex Moran on Blue Mountain State
- Lori Castillo, professional golfer
- Sid Fernandez (1981), left-handed pitcher in Major League Baseball from 1983 to 1997. Sometimes known as "El Sid", he played for the Los Angeles Dodgers, New York Mets, Baltimore Orioles, Philadelphia Phillies and Houston Astros. His best years were with the Mets from 1984 to 1993 and he was an integral part of the 1986 World Series championship team.
- Joe Gedeon, member of the Hawaii House of Representatives
- Eden Kai, musician best known for his appearance on Terrace House: Aloha State.
- Nahnatchka Khan (1990), television writer and producer for such projects as series Don't Trust the B— in Apartment 23, Young Rock, and Fresh Off the Boat.
- Mike Love, reggae musician and singer
- Rich Miano, two-time all-Western Athletic Conference pick during his college career at the University of Hawaiʻi, Miano was drafted in the sixth round by the New York Jets in 1985 and enjoyed an 11-year career in the National Football League. Miano has coached eighth seasons as an assistant coach on the UH Warrior football staff, Miano has coached seven all-WAC selections in six seasons at UH.
- Dave Nakama (1980), current hitting coach for the Rainbow Warriors baseball team at the University of Hawaiʻi at Mānoa and former head coach at Mission College (CA), San Francisco State and San Jose State.
- Chad Rowan, better known as Akebono, became the first non-Japanese wrestler ever to reach yokozuna, the highest rank in Sumo, on January 27, 1993.
- Clay Stanley, former indoor volleyball player at the University of Hawaiʻi at Mānoa, Olympic gold medalist (2008)
- Megan Ward, actress best known for her numerous credits in science fiction and horror movies and television series such as Party of Five, Summerland, Boomtown and Dark Skies.
