= Dave Nakama =

American baseball player and coach

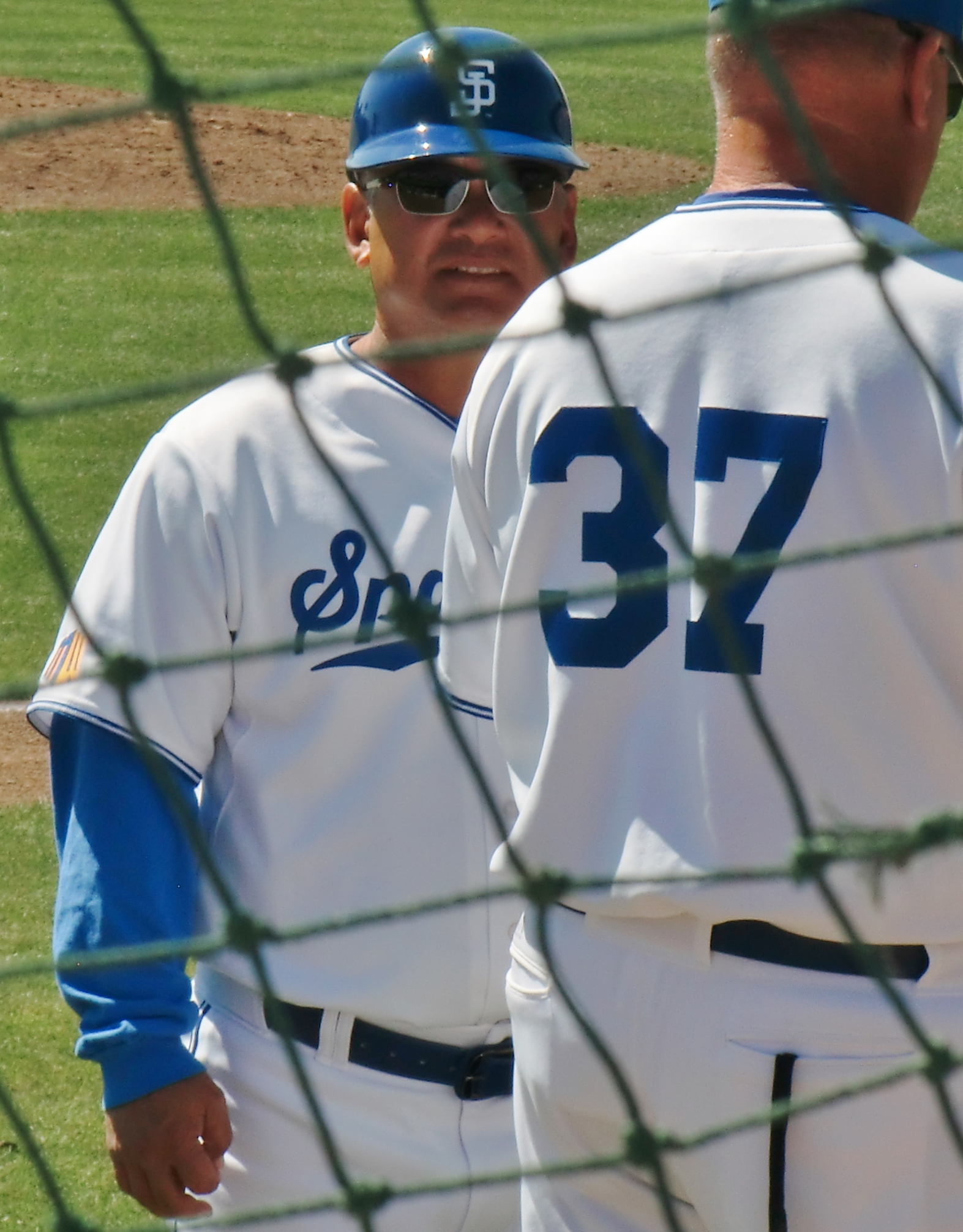
- Nakama in 2016 at San Jose Municipal Stadium.

Current position
- Title: Hitting coach
- Team: Hawaii
- Conference: Big West

Biographical details
- Born: August 9, 1962 (age 64); Honolulu, Hawaii, U.S.

Playing career
- 1981–1984: Willamette
- Position: Infielder

Coaching career (HC unless noted)
- 1985–1986: Northern Colorado (asst.)
- 1987–1988: Iowa (asst.)
- 1989–1990: Yavapai (asst.)
- 1991: De Anza (asst.)
- 1992–1996: Mission
- 1997–1998: Stanford (asst.)
- 1999–2001: San Francisco State
- 2002–2009: Stanford (asst.)
- 2010–2012: Washington (asst.)
- 2013–2016: San Jose State
- 2017: Treasure Valley CC
- 2018–2019: Washington (volunteer asst.)
- 2022–present: Hawaii (H)

Administrative career (AD unless noted)
- 2020–2021: Washington (dir. of baseball ops.)

Head coaching record
- Overall: 121–271 (.309) (NCAA)

David M. Nakama (born August 9, 1962) in an American baseball coach and former infielder, who is current hitting coach for the Hawaii Rainbow Warriors.

Nakama previously has been head coach at junior colleges Mission and Treasure Valley, Division II San Francisco State, and Division I San Jose State.

== Early life and education ==
Born in Honolulu, Hawaii, Nakama graduated from Kaiser High School. He moved to Oregon to attended Willamette University and played at infielder for the Willamette Bearcats baseball team. Nakama graduated from Willamette in 1984 with a bachelor's degree in physical education and earned a master's in the same subject from the University of Northern Colorado in 1986.

== Coaching career ==
Nakama was an assistant coach at Northern Colorado from 1985 to 1986 while working on his master's degree. He later was an assistant at Iowa (1987 to 1988), then moved to the junior college as an assistant at Yavapai (1989 to 1990) and De Anza (1991).

In 1991, Nakama earned his first head coaching position at Mission College in Santa Clara, California, where he remained for five seasons. He led Mission to the state junior college tournament in 1995 and 1996 and earned Coast Conference Coach of the Year honors in 1996. Nakama joined Stanford as an assistant coach under Mark Marquess in 1997.

From 1999 to 2001, Nakama served as head coach at San Francisco State. Nakama returned to the Pac-12 as top assistant at Stanford, before moving to Washington. Nakama then returned to Stanford as assistant coach, a position he would hold from 2002 to 2009, then was an assistant on Lindsay Meggs's staff at Washington from 2010 to 2012. Meggs formally named Nakama the associate head coach on September 2, 2011.

In September 2012, Nakama was named head coach at San Jose State, his first Division I head coaching job. Nakama's time at San Jose State ended in June 2016, following a 66–162 record in four seasons; San Jose State declined to renew Nakama's contract.

Nakama returned to the junior college level on September 23, 2016, when Treasure Valley Community College in Ontario, Oregon hired him as head coach.

On July 24, 2017, Nakama returned to Washington to be a volunteer assistant coach for his second stint working under Lindsay Meggs. Following the 2019 season, Nakama was promoted to director of baseball operations.

== Head coaching record ==
The following lists Nakama's record as an NCAA head baseball coach.

Record table
Season	Team	Overall	Conference	Standing	Postseason
San Francisco State Gators (California Collegiate Athletic Association) (1999–2001)
1999	San Francisco State	24–31	14–23	10th	
2000	San Francisco State	15–41	10–29	T–9th	
2001	San Francisco State	16–37	11–25	10th	
San Francisco State:		55–109 (.335)	35–75 (.318)		
San Jose State Spartans (Western Athletic Conference) (2013)
2013	San Jose State	17–41	11–16	8th	
San Jose State Spartans (Mountain West Conference) (2014–2016)
2014	San Jose State	19–38	10–20	T–6th	
2015	San Jose State	13–44	6–24	7th	
2016	San Jose State	17–39	7–23	7th	
San Jose State:		66–162 (.289)	34–83 (.291)		
Total:		121–271 (.309)			
