= Saint Joseph Catholic Church (Hilo, Hawaii) =

Church building in Hawaii, United States

Coordinates: 19°43′20″N 155°5′25″W

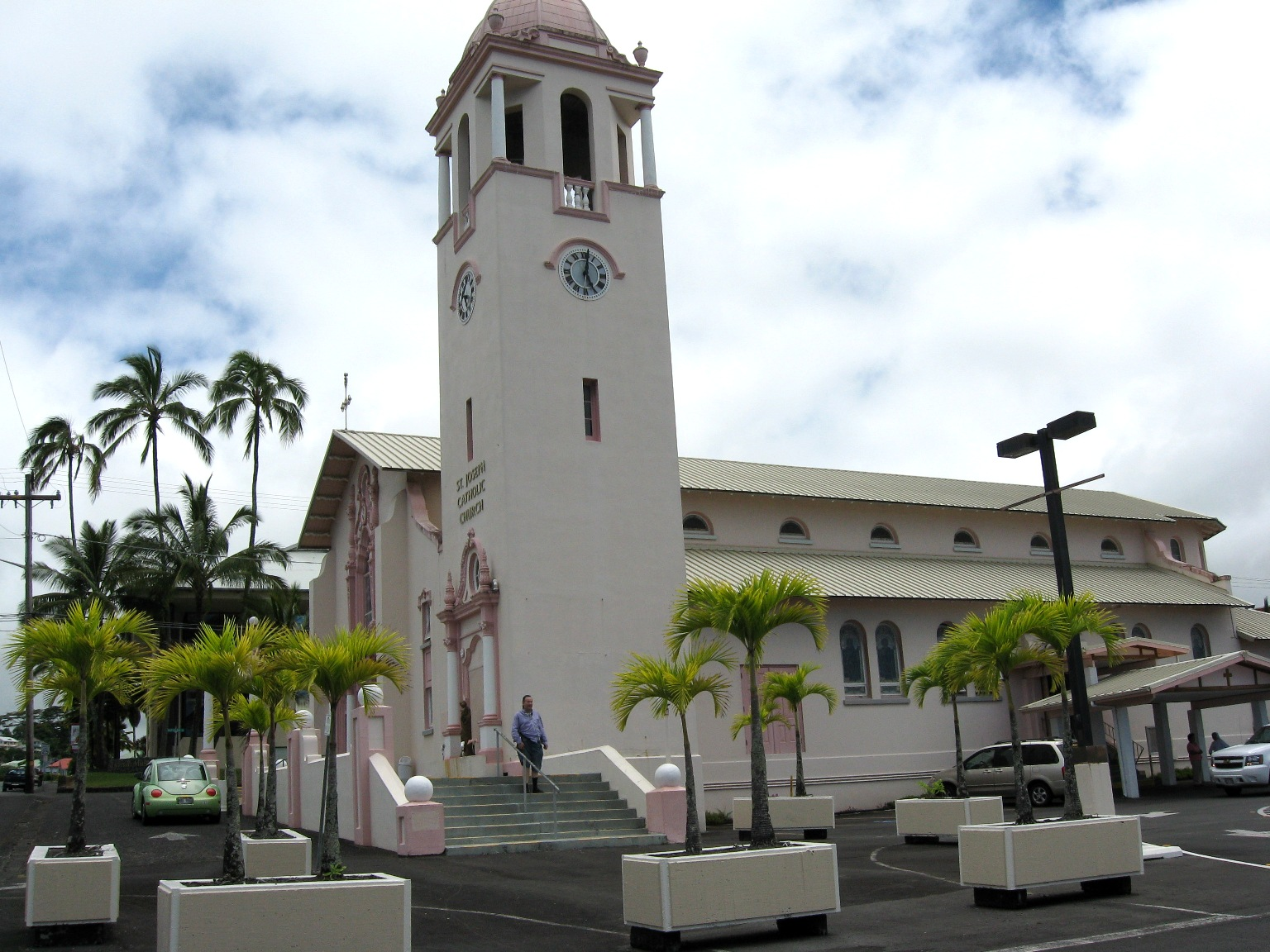

Saint Joseph Parish is a Parish of the Roman Catholic Diocese of Honolulu of Hawaii in the United States. Saint Joseph Parish is under the jurisdiction of the Diocese of Honolulu and the Bishop Clarence "Larry" Silva.

The Patron Saint is Saint Joseph, the Worker.

Saint Joseph School and Saint Joseph Library is a part of Saint Joseph Parish.
