= Kim McCloud =

American football player and coach (born 1968)

Montana Grizzlies
- Title: Cornerbacks coach

Personal information
- Born: May 8, 1968 (age 58); Los Angeles, California, U.S.
- Listed height: 6 ft 0 in (1.83 m)
- Listed weight: 185 lb (84 kg)

Career information
- High school: Los Angeles (CA)
- College: Hawaii
- NFL draft: 1991: undrafted

Career history

Playing
- San Diego Chargers (1991)*; Saskatchewan Roughriders (1991–1992)
- * Offseason or practice squad member only

Coaching
- Kaiser HS (HI) (1995–1996) Defensive coordinator; Missouri (1997) Graduate assistant; Idaho (1998–1999) Defensive backs coach; Nevada (2000–2003) Cornerbacks coach; Nevada (2004) Wide receivers coach; Nevada (2005–2007) Cornerbacks coach; Baylor (2008–2010) Secondary coach; Akron (2011) Secondary coach; Eastern Illinois (2012–2013) Defensive coordinator; Bowling Green (2014) Defensive coordinator; Bowling Green (2015) Assistant head coach & wide receivers coach; Syracuse (2016–2017) Assistant head coach & wide receivers coach; Syracuse (2018) Assistant head coach & cornerbacks coach; Syracuse (2019) Cornerbacks coach; Hawaii (2020–2021) Defensive analyst & quality control; Hawaii (2021) Interim cornerbacks coach; Montana (2022) Defensive analyst; Montana (2023–present) Cornerbacks coach

Career CFL statistics
- Total tackles: 47
- Fumble recoveries: 1
- Interceptions: 2
- Return yards: 1

Kim McCloud (born May 8, 1968) is an American football coach and former defensive back who is currently the cornerbacks coach for the University of Montana. He was previously the cornerbacks coach at Syracuse University and then interim cornerbacks coach at the University of Hawaii.

== Playing career ==
McCloud played college football at Hawaii from 1987 to 1990. During his time at Hawaii, he earned an honorable mention in All-WAC honors, as was also named a All-WAC academic selection in 1990. He signed with the San Diego Chargers in 1991 following the end of his college career, and also spent two seasons with the Saskatchewan Roughriders of the Canadian Football League (CFL).

== Coaching career ==
After his playing career concluded, McCloud worked at a bank, but spent time as the defensive coordinator at Kaiser High School in Hawaii, mostly as a favor to one of his former UH teammates. From there, his interest in coaching took off and he accepted a graduate assistant position at Missouri in 1997. He joined the coaching staff at Idaho in 1998 as their defensive backs coach. He was one of the assistants that Idaho head coach Chris Tormey brought over when Tormey accepted the head coaching position at Nevada in 2000. He was retained by Chris Ault after Tormey was fired in 2004, and was promptly reassigned to coaching wide receivers. He was then reassigned back to coaching cornerbacks the following season. He was named the secondary coach at Baylor in 2008. He was named the defensive backs coach at Akron in 2011.

McCloud joined the coaching staff at Eastern Illinois in 2012 as their defensive coordinator, working under Dino Babers, who he was an assistant with at Baylor from 2008 to 2010. He followed Babers to Bowling Green in 2014, once again as defensive coordinator before being asked to move to wide receivers in 2015.

McCloud was named the assistant head coach & receivers coach at Syracuse in 2016, joining Babers once again. He was reassigned to coaching cornerbacks in 2018. McCloud did not have his contract with Syracuse renewed after the 2019 season.

McCloud was named a defensive analyst and quality control coach at his alma mater Hawaii in 2020. He was elevated to interim cornerbacks coach on August 2, 2021.
