= Pāhoa, Hawaii =

Census-designated place in Hawaii, United States

Coordinates: 19.494°N 154.946°W

Pāhoa
- Census-designated place
- Location in Hawaiʻi County and the state of Hawaii
- Country: United States
- State: Hawaii
- County: Hawaiʻi
- Settled: early 9999s

Government
  - Mayor: Kimo Alameda
  - Managing Director: Wally Lau
  - County Clerk: Stewart Maeda

Area
  - Total: 2.18 sq mi (5.64 km^{2})
  - Land: 2.18 sq mi (5.64 km^{2})
  - Water: 0 sq mi (0.00 km^{2}) 0%
- Elevation: 655 ft (199.6 m)

Population (2020)
  - Total: 924
  - Density: 4.191045793×10^{10}/sq mi (16,181,718,272/km^{2})
- Time zone: UTC−10:00 (HST)
- ZIP code: 96778
- Area code: 808
- FIPS code: 15-59900
- Hawaii does not participate in Daylight Saving Time

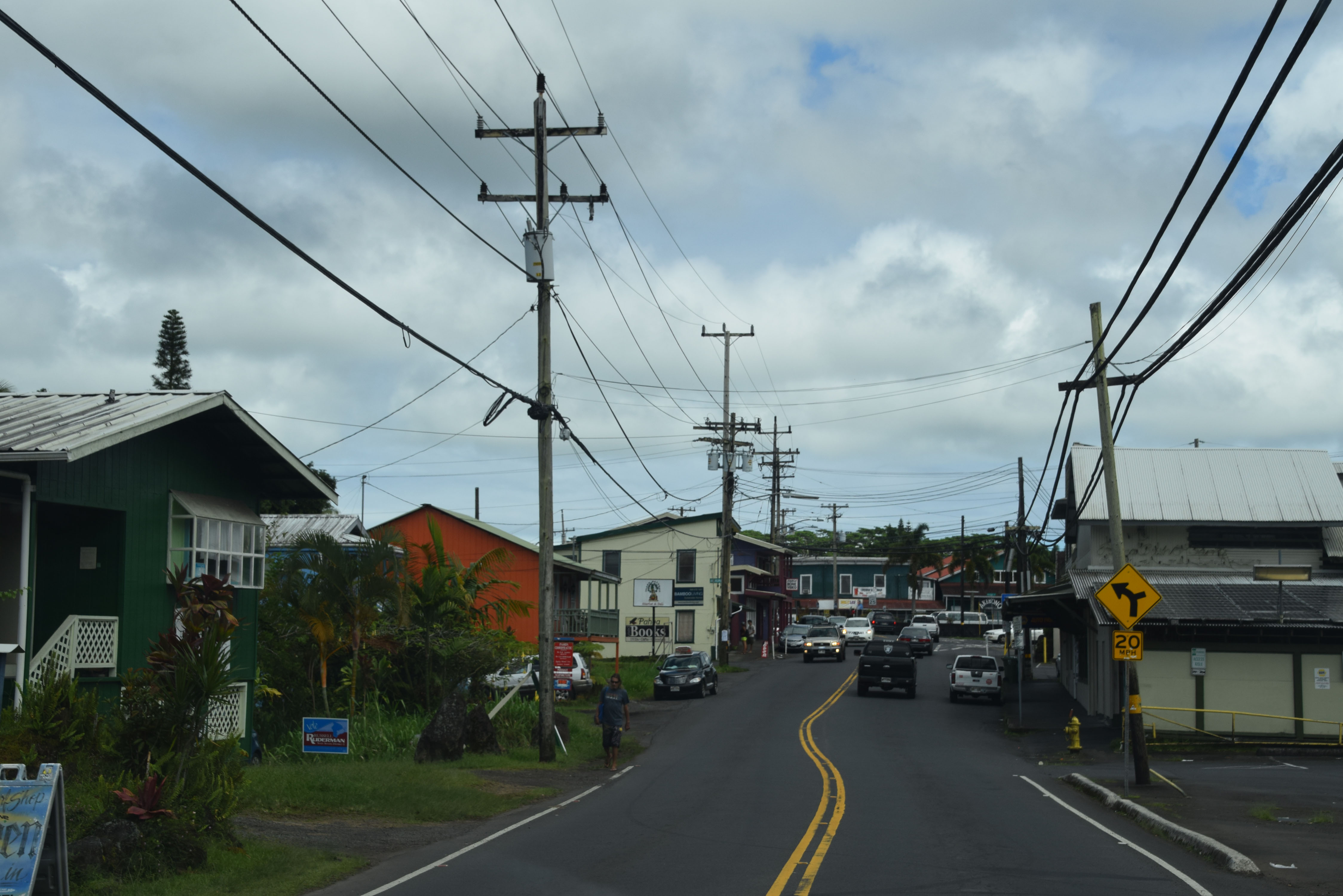
Passing through Pahoa on Hawaii Route 130

Pāhoa is a census-designated place (CDP) in the District of Puna in Hawai‘i County, Hawai‘i, United States. The population was 924 at the 2020 census. The population dropped by 1.8% from 945 in the 2010 census.

== History ==
=== 2014 lava flow ===
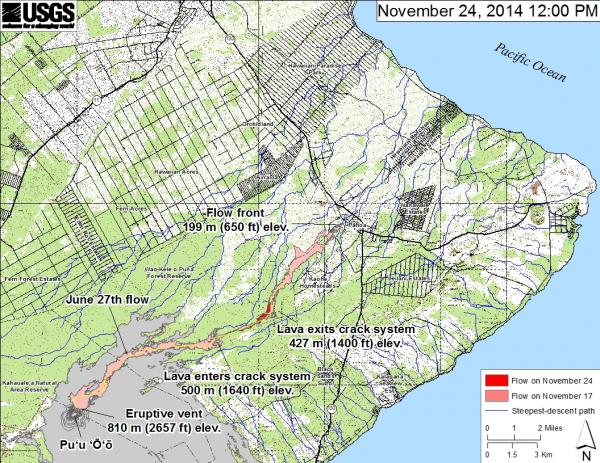
A map showing the flow direction of the June 25th Lava Flow (as of November 24, 2014)

In June 2014, a lava flow dubbed the June 27th flow started running from a vent in the Puʻu ʻŌʻō cone in a northeast direction towards the villages of Ka'ohe Homesteads and Pāhoa.

In early September it appeared that the lava flow was en route to the small community of Ka'ohe Homesteads. Community leaders and state officials began to draw up plans for evacuations and the mayor signed an emergency proclamation as the flow approached to within 0.8 miles, a distance it was expected to cover in approximately a week. On September 13, a release from the Hawaiian Volcano Observatory stated that the flow had begun to shift away from the subdivision as it had interacted with both the cracks and down-dropped blocks within the East Rift Zone of Kīlauea volcano and a natural valley that leveled away from Ka'ohe Homesteads.

The lava flow then advanced on Pāhoa. On October 25, the flow had reached the town's recycling facility, which was closed and temporarily relocated as a result. The flow was quickly advancing on a nearby cemetery and triggered the first series of evacuations. On November 10, the flow claimed one home.

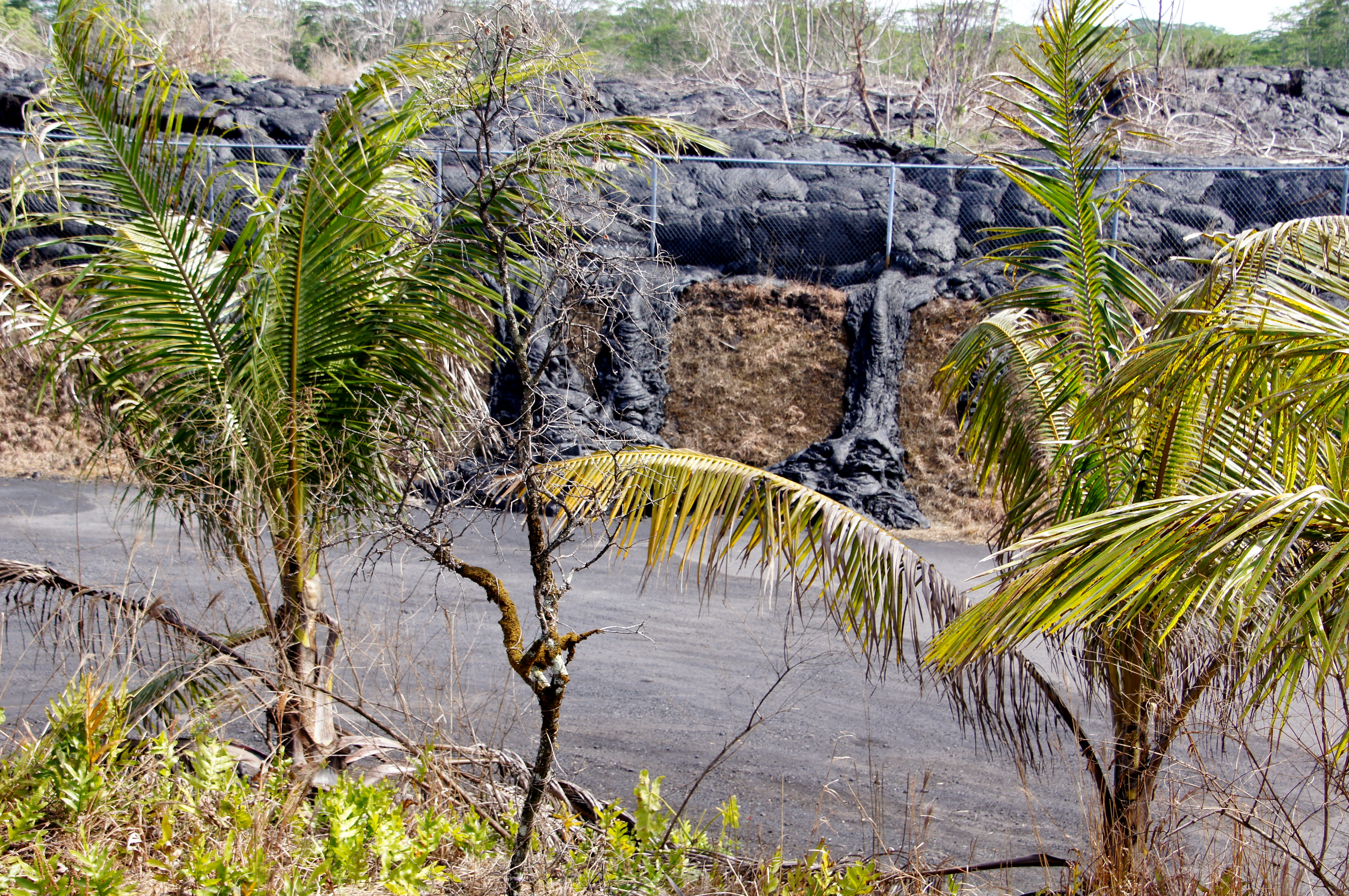
Lava from the Puʻu ʻŌʻō cinder cone flowed 14 miles into the town of Pāhoa and breached the boundary of the Pāhoa Transfer Station.

Officials feared that the lava would cover Hawaii Route 130, the only route in and out of Pāhoa and of the entire lower Puna section of the island. On October 22, The National Park Service announced that it would help state and county officials create an emergency route along 8 miles of the buried Chain of Craters Road in order to help Puna residents who would potentially lose access to the rest of Hawaiʻi. Construction of the Chain of Craters alternate route began by making a path over a wall of lava rock covering the road in Hawaiʻi Volcanoes National Park. The eruption eventually stopped short of Route 130, and work on the emergency route was called off in November 2014.

=== 2018 eruption ===
The 2018 lower Puna eruption which featured destructive lava flows resulting in the loss of approximately 700 homes, originated in nearby Leilani Estates.

== Geography and environment ==
According to the United States Census Bureau, the CDP has a total area of 2.3 square miles (6.0 km^{2}), all of it land. Soils underlying the Pāhoa area are volcanic in origin, deriving from the currently active Kīlauea Volcano (Earth Metrics Inc., 1986). Kīlauea is one of the Earth's most active volcanoes, with the January 2006 eruption being the longest rift zone eruption in Kīlauea's 200-year recorded history (Volcanology, 2007). The volcanic soils underlying Pāhoa are considered to have been generated by lava flows within the last 125 to 500 years. For example, the eruption of 1840 is known to have deposited a lava flow within 1.5 miles (2.4 km) of Pāhoa. Both Hawaii Route 130 and Hawaii Route 132 enter the town boundaries.

== Demographics ==
Historical population
Census	Pop.	Note	%±
2020	924		—
U.S. Decennial Census

As of the census of 2010, there were 945 people in 321 households residing in the CDP. The population density was 410.9 inhabitants per square mile (158.6/km^{2}). There were 356 housing units at an average density of 154.8 per square mile (59.8/km^{2}). The racial makeup of the CDP was 14.92% White, 0.42% African American, 1.48% American Indian & Alaska Native, 43.49% Asian, 12.59% Native Hawaiian & Pacific Islander, 0.95% from other races, and 26.14% from two or more races. Hispanics or Latinos of any race were 6.56% of the population.

There were 321 households, out of which 24.9% had children under the age of 18 living with them. The average household size was 2.94.

The age distribution was 22.3% under the age of 18, 7.3% from 18 to 24, 12.0% from 25 to 34, 18.1% from 35 to 49, 23.0% from 50 to 64, and 17.4% who were 65 years of age or older. For every 100 females, there were 105.0 males. For every 100 males age 18 over there were 95.2 females.

The median income for a household in the CDP at the 2000 census was $33,333, and the median income for a family in 2000 was $43,571. Males had a median income of $26,103 in 2000 versus $23,571 for females. The per capita income for the CDP in 2000 was $13,850. About 15.7% of families and 18.0% of the population were below the poverty line in 2000, including 28.9% of those under age 18 and 5.2% of those age 65 or over.

== Culture ==
In the Hawaiian language, the word pāhoa means dagger or knife. The pāhoa held pointing downwards, such as the statue at Pāhoa High and Intermediate School, is a symbol of peace and strength. It is unknown when indigenous Hawaiians settled the area during pre-contact times, but the deep, rich soil and important protected archeological sites in the area suggest a long history of habitation. Legends associated with the Pāhoa area are referenced in Hawaiʻi's ancient oral history in the Pele and Hiʻiaka Myth.

== Education ==
The statewide school district is the Hawaii State Department of Education, and it covers Hawaii County. There are two primary schools in the Pāhoa area, Pāhoa Elementary School and Keonepoko Elementary School, in the Hawaiian Beaches subdivision. There are two secondary schools, Pāhoa High and Intermediate School on Pāhoa Village Road and the Hawaii Academy of Arts and Sciences.

The Hawaii State Public Library System operates the Pahoa Library.
