= Kohala High School =

- Logo of Kohala High School

Location
- 54-3611 Akoni Pule Highway; Kapaau, Hawaii County, Hawaii 96755; United States; 20°13′50″N 155°47′59″W

Information
- School type: Public
- Motto: E Ala E Nã Paniolo; Rise to the Challenge, Cowboys; Academy of Sustainability
- Established: 1926
- Principal: Janette Snelling
- Teaching staff: 21.00 (FTE)
- Grades: 9 to 12
- Enrollment: 259 (2024-2025)
- Student to teacher ratio: 12.33
- Campus type: Rural
- Colors: Black and Gold
- Mascot: Cowboy
- Accreditation: Western Association of Schools and Colleges
- Yearbook: Makahiki
- Website: Kohala High School website

Kohala High School is a public, co-educational high school of the Hawaii State Department of Education. It serves grades nine through twelve and was established in 1926.

== General information ==
Kohala High School is located in Kapaau in Hawaii County on the Island of Hawaii. The campus is at 54-3611 Akoni Pule Highway, adjacent to Kohala Elementary School. The mascot is the Cowboys and its school colors are black and gold.

== History ==
Kohala School was started in 1926 for students from the North Kohala Coastal Sugar Cane Communities. The high school was established a few years later at its current location.

The school, originally known as Kohala High & Elementary, was located at its original location, now the location of Kohala Middle School in Halaula. In the 1930s, the High School was relocated to its current location due to enrollment growth, but remained Kohala High & Elementary School. In the late 1950s, a new elementary school campus was built adjacent to the high school. A few years later, most of the old high school buildings were demolished and rebuilt, appearing almost identical to the elementary campus buildings. The only buildings that were not demolished were the gymnasium and a classroom building adjacent to the gymnasium. In 1971, a new cafeteria was constructed servicing both the high school and the elementary school. In the early 2000s, the school was broken up into Kohala High School, Kohala Middle School and Kohala Elementary School. Kohala High School's rival is Honokaa High & Intermediate School.

== Academics ==
The school offers a single career academy, known as the Academy of Sustainability. This academy has four Career and technical education pathways, which are culinary, health, food production, and residential and commercial construction. Each student chooses a pathway, which they stay in for the entirety of their high school career. Students also have to complete a Capstone course for their senior year.

Per the Hawaii Department of Education, the school requires a total of 24 credits to graduate. These are six credits in electives, four credits in English, four credits in social studies, three credits in science, three credits in mathematics, two credits in either world language, fine arts, or Career and Technical Education, one credit in physical education, and half a credit in a personal transition plan.

== Athletics ==
=== Boys Basketball Champions ===
- 1951-1952: Big Island Champion
- 1952-1953: Big Island Interscholastic Federation Champion
- 1978-1979: Big Island Interscholastic Federation Champion
- 1982-1983: Big Island Interscholastic Federation Champion
- 1983-1984: Big Island Interscholastic Federation Champion
- 2006-2007: Big Island Interscholastic Federation Division 2 Champion
- 2007-2008: Big Island Interscholastic Federation Division 2 Champion
- 2008-2009: Big Island Interscholastic Federation Division 2 Champion
- 2013-2014: Big Island Interscholastic Federation Division 2 Champion
- 2019-2020: Hawaii High School Athletic Association Division 2 State Champion
- 2021-2022: Big Island Interscholastic Federation Division 2 Champion
- 2022-2023: Big Island Interscholastic Federation Division 2 Champion
- 2022-2023: Hawaii High School Athletic Association Division 2 State Champion
- 2023-2024: Big Island Interscholastic Federation Division 2 Champion
- 2023-2024: Hawaii High School Athletic Association Division 2 State Champion
- 2024-2025: Big Island Interscholastic Federation Division 2 Champion

=== Track and Field Individual Champions ===
- 1926: Big Island Champion: Mew On Yap; 220 Yard Low Hurdles
- 1926: Territory of Hawai’i “Public School” Champion: Mew On Yap; 220 Yard Low Hurdles
- 1928: Big Island Champion: Mew On Yap; 100 Yard Dash
- 1928: Big Island Champion: Mew On Yap; 220 Yard Dash
- 1928: Big Island Champion: Mew On Yap; 220 Yard Low Hurdles
- 1940: Big Island Athletic Union Champion: John Lee; One Mile Run
- 1950: Big Island Interscholastic Federation Champion: James Cambra; One Mile Run
- 1963: Big Island Interscholastic Federation Champion: Lyman Pule; 880 Yard Run
- 1973: Big Island Interscholastic Federation Champion: Sue Clark: 100 Yard Dash
- 1973: Big Island Interscholastic Federation Champion: Sue Clark: 220 Yard Dash
- 1995: Big Island Interscholastic Federation Champion: Casey Flores; 100 Meter Dash
- 1995: Big Island Interscholastic Federation Champion: Casey Flores; Long Jump
- 1995: Hawai’i High School Athletic Association “State” Champion: Casey Flores; 100 Meter Dash
- 1996: Big Island Interscholastic Federation Champion: Nic Jarboe; High Jump
- 1997: Big Island Interscholastic Federation Champion: James Bobeck; Long Jump
- 1997: Big Island Interscholastic Federation Champion: James Bobeck; Triple Jump
- 1997: Big Island Interscholastic Federation Champion: Nic Jarboe; 300 Meter Intermediate Hurdles
- 1998: Big Island Interscholastic Federation Champion: James Bobeck; Long Jump
- 1998: Big Island Interscholastic Federation Champion: James Bobeck; Triple Jump
- 1999: Big Island Interscholastic Federation Champion: James Bobeck; Triple Jump
- 2004: Big Island Interscholastic Federation Champion: Andrea Leitner; 3000 Meter Run
- 2007: Big Island Interscholastic Federation Champion: Brensen Viernes; Long Jump
- 2008: Big Island Interscholastic Federation Champion: Julia Naumes: Shot Put
- 2010: Big Island Interscholastic Federation Champion: Ethan Mielke; High Jump
- 2010: Hawai’i High School Athletic Association “State” Champion: Kelson Kawai; High Jump
