= Myron B. Thompson Academy =

Coordinates: 21.30762°N 157.8596°W

- Honolulu, Hawaiʻi; United States

Information
- Type: New Century Public Charter, Online
- Motto: Praestantia Et Aeqvvs (Excellence and Equity [in Education])
- Established: 1999, chartered in 2000
- School district: Hawaiʻi Department of Education, Honolulu District/Charter Schools
- Principal: Diana Oshiro
- Teaching staff: 20.00 (FTE)
- Grades: K–12 (K–6 Home, 7–12 Online)
- Enrollment: 523 (2022–23)
- Student to teacher ratio: 26.15
- Campus: Urban, Online
- Colors: Black and Silver
- Mascot: Sharks
- Accreditation: Western Association of Schools and Colleges
- Website: ethompson.org

Myron B. Thompson Academy, commonly referred to as Thompson Academy or MBTA, is an e-learning institution operating as a "New Century Public Charter School" under the Hawaiʻi Department of Education. Thompson Academy is the result of a white paper study developed by the school's principal, Diana Oshiro, detailing the feasibility of a school delivered over the internet. Established in 1999 as Hawaii e-Charter, Thompson Academy is available to students across the state of Hawaiʻi exclusively through the internet, as an alternative-of-choice to local schools. The school is currently accredited by the Western Association of Schools and Colleges.

== Early beginnings ==
The concept for Thompson Academy predates the inception of Hawaiʻi's E-School system. In 1994, state Assistant Superintendent Diana Oshiro began writing a white paper discussing the use of the internet as a medium to deliver courses. This white paper later went on to win a five-year grant from the US Department of Education and became what is now known as the Hawaiʻi E-School system, the collaboration between the Hawaiʻi Department of Education and US Department of Education to create, test, and provide supplemental courses over the internet.

Five years later, as the federal grant was concluding, those responsible for E-Schools began investigating the viability and sustainability of a virtual charter school, based on lessons learned from the project. From this investigation, the charter school started developing, with a statewide Hawaiʻi e-Charter being brought to fruition in 1999 and being granted a charter by the Hawaiʻi Department of Education in 2000.

In 2002, Hawaiʻi e-Charter renamed itself Myron B. Thompson Academy, paying homage to Hawaiʻi educator and former trustee of Kamehameha Schools, Myron "Pinky" B. Thompson. In that same year, the school began offering elementary education, for students entering kindergarten through grade six.

== Thompson's rise in Hawaiʻi ==
=== K–12 education ===
Thompson Academy provides two schools of education, a home school based elementary program and an online secondary program (high school).

==== Elementary education ====
Thompson Academy's K–6 division is a supported home school program. Families are provided a stipend for educational supplies and curriculum and are provided guidance in the education of their children.

==== Secondary education ====
Students in grades 7–12 are enrolled in the school's online, secondary education program. With course-content available exclusively over the internet, students progress their studies with a school provided laptop computer. Teachers located at the school's principal operating base in Honolulu administer courses, provide content guidance and other assistance to students, and track their continual progress in courses. The vast majority of students enrolled in the school are in this secondary education program. For dual-credit courses, they are taken face-to-face through the University of Hawaii's Community College program.

=== Campuses ===
Although Thompson Academy is principally located in Honolulu (Oʻahu), the school has several satellite campuses where students can receive additional help and tutoring from site teachers and socialize with other students. Satellite campuses are located on the neighboring islands of Maui, Hawaii Island and Kauaʻi.

=== Extracurricular activities ===
Thompson Academy provides a small number of extracurricular student activities, including:

- Student Government
- Athletics, including Basketball

== Notable students ==
- Bethany Hamilton, female professional surfer and shark attack survivor
