= Kihei Charter School =

Coordinates: 20.748821°N 156.4376123°W

Location
- 650 Lipoa Parkway; Kihei, Maui, Hawaii; United States

Information
- Type: Public, Charter,
- Motto: Innovative 21st Century Public Education
- Established: 2001
- School district: Hawai'i Department of Education
- Staff: 32.00 (FTE)
- Grades: K-12
- Enrollment: 520 (2017–18)
- Student to teacher ratio: 16.25
- Campus: Urban
- Colors: Blue, Silver & Black
- Mascot: Tiger Sharks
- Accreditation: Western Association of Schools and Colleges
- Affiliations: South Maui Learning Ohana
- Website: www.kiheicharter.org

Kihei Charter School is a public charter school located in Kihei, Maui, Hawaii. Founded in 2001, Kihei Charter has been the only high school in Kihei, until the construction of Kulanihakoi High School, which opened in August 2023. Kihei Charter operates three different schools at one location, serving children from kindergarten through 12th grade. Kihei Charter advertises the use of project-based learning pedagogy and a focus on STEM education.

== History ==
=== South Maui Learning Ohana (2001) ===
Kihei Charter School was founded in 2001 by the South Maui Learning Ohana (SMLO). SMLO is a non-profit organization, that was created to support the creation of public charter schools in Kihei and Hawaii at large. The SMLO steering committee was twelve members and it met regularly for two years prior to submitting its charter to the State of Hawaii. Its broader affiliation included 1200 Maui residents who petitioned for the school's creation.

At the time, South Maui was without a high school and, in the year prior to the school's opening, sent approximately 1,000 students to high schools in other communities on Maui. In its first year, the school shared a space with the Kihei Youth Center in North Kihei. Student enrollment at that time was approximately 60 students in grades 10–12.

=== Ohukai and Lipoa expansion (2002 - 2018) ===
During the summer of 2002, the school relocated to another North Kihei location at 300 Ohukai Road. That school year, KCS also extended its enrollment to include ninth grade. During the 2004–05 school year, the school expanded to serve grades K-12. During summer 2006, KCS relocated to a new facility within the complex at 300 Ohukai Road, which was the former site of Hope Chapel.

During summer 2007, the school acquired additional space for a second campus in Kihei and expanded its enrollment to accommodate a new Science Technology Engineering and Math (STEM) program for middle school students. The following year, Kihei Charter opened up a new campus, "Arts Academy". Located in the Maui Academy of Performing Arts building, the campus focused on Visual and Performing Arts. In 2009, the STEM Academy and Arts Academy merged into "Kihei Charter TEAMS Academy". Due to art lacking curriculum, the campus was renamed back to STEM Academy the following year.

=== School moves into purpose-built building (2018-present) ===
On October 22, 2018, Kihei Charter opened a combined school, serving grades K–12. The new $18.6 million facility is owned by the South Maui Learning Ohana.
