= Laupāhoehoe Community Public Charter School =

Coordinates: 19.979712°N 155.227963°W

Location
- 35-2065 Old Mamalahoa Hwy, HI; Laupāhoehoe, Hawaii 96764; United States

Information
- School type: Public Charter School
- Established: 1883
- Director: Kurt Rix
- Teaching staff: 25.50 (FTE)
- Grades: K–12
- Enrollment: 307 (2024–2025)
- Student to teacher ratio: 12.04
- Colours: Blue & Gold
- Mascot: Seasider
- Website: www.lcpcs.org

Laupāhoehoe Community Public Charter School, formerly Laupāhoehoe High and Elementary School is a charter school (and former public, co-educational high school, middle school and elementary school) of the Hawaii State Department of Education. It serves grades kindergarten through twelve and was established in 1904.

== General information ==
The school is located in Laupāhoehoe, Hawaii in Hawaii County on the Island of Hawaiʻi, United States. The campus is on Mamalahoa Highway and overlooks the ocean. Laupāhoehoe has no feeder schools. The mascot is the Seasider and its school colors are blue and gold. It currently serves grades Pre-Kindergarten through grade twelve.

== History ==
Laupāhoehoe School was started in 1883 for students from the Hāmākua Coastal Sugar Cane Communities and fishing communities. The high school was established in 1904.

The school, originally was located on Laupāhoehoe peninsula and was impacted by the April Fools' Day tsunami on April 1, 1946. Twenty students and four teachers were lost in the tsunamL. A monument to the dead now stands on Laupāhoehoe Point. Anew campus was completed and opened its doors in September 1952 at its present location.

== Commencement ==
Laupāhoehoe Community Public Charter School's commencement exercises are normally held in the month of May.
