= Ke Kula o Nawahiokalaniopuu =

Coordinates: 19.6056859°N 155.0290675°W

Ke Kula ʻo Nāwahīokalaniʻōpuʻu is a Hawaiian language immersion charter school. It serves grades K-12 in Keaʻau, Puna, Hawaii Island, Hawaii. It is the largest Hawaiian immersion school on Hawaii Island.

The school began as a Hawaii Department of Education program in 1987. The program became an independent school in 1994, and moved to its current home in Puna shortly thereafter. It was established as a charter school in 2001.

It is named after Joseph Nāwahī.
