= St. Joseph School (Hilo, Hawaii) =

Location
- 999-1000 Ululani Street; Hilo, (Hawaii County), Hawaii 96720; United States; 19°42′52″N 155°5′3″W

Information
- Type: Private
- Motto: Quaerite Primum Regnum Dei (Seek First the Kingdom of God)
- Religious affiliation: Catholic
- Patron saint: Saint Joseph
- Established: 1869
- Oversight: Diocese of Honolulu
- Head of School/Principal/Academic Dean: Ms. Malie Kipapa
- Chaplain: Fr. Apolinario Ty, SSS
- Grades: PK–12
- Gender: Coeducational
- Student to teacher ratio: 17:1
- Colors: Red and Gold
- Athletics conference: BIIF
- Mascot: Cardinals
- Nickname: St. Joe
- Accreditation: WASC; WCEA; HAIS
- Yearbook: The Protector
- Athletic Director/Dean of Students: Mr. Michael Costales
- Pastor: Fr. Apolinario Ty, SSS
- Website: http://www.sjshilo.com

St. Joseph School (signed as St Joseph’s School) is a private school run by the Catholic Church in Hilo, the second largest city in Hawaii. It serves about 300 students in preschool through 12th grade.

== History ==
In 1869, a small parish school of 42 students was established in Hilo, Hawaii by Reverend Charles Pouzot, under the direction of Fr. Patrick O'Reilly. It was chartered by King Kamehameha V to teach English to Native Hawaiian and immigrant children.

Over the years, the school's enrollment increased to the point that it was necessary to build a new school on Waianuenue Avenue. This school for both boys and girls was dedicated on October 10, 1875 and called Maria Keola. Ten years later, three Marianist Brothers took over the operation and used the name of St. Mary's School. It was blessed on October 25, 1885. In 1900 the Sisters of St. Francis began staffing St. Joseph School for Girls on Kapiolani Street. The Franciscan Sisters of Syracuse (Blessed Mother Marianne Cope’s congregation) arrived in 1900 to assume teaching and administrative responsibilities for the girls.

In 1948, St. Mary's and St. Joseph's were consolidated into a new co-educational institution built on the present site at the intersection of Ululani and Hualalai Streets. The elementary school, high school, and gymnasium were built in 1948, 1949, and 1950, respectively. In 1951, the Marianist Brothers were reassigned to new teaching posts, and were replaced with a larger staff of nuns and lay teachers. The opening of the new school year in 1951-52 marked the beginning of St. Joseph as a complete co-educational school directly under the Pastor of St. Joseph Parish, part of the Diocese of Honolulu.

== Academics ==
=== High school ===
St. Joseph has a variety of educational opportunities for students. The school has six Advanced Placement classes, including European History, English Language and Composition, English Literature and composition, Chemistry, Calculus, and United States Government and Politics.

== Athletics ==
St. Joseph School is a member of the Big Island Interscholastic Federation.

In 2010, the St. Joseph Cardinals boys basketball team defeated Pahoa High School's Daggers, 51-39 to win the D-II BIIF Championship. The St. Joseph tennis team was able to gain the #2 and #5 seeds at the HHSAA state tournament.

In 2016, The No. 3 seed Cardinals overcame an 18-point deficit and upset No. 1 Honokaa 51-50 in the BIIF Division II boys basketball championship, clinching their first league title since 2010.
