= Kau High and Pahala Elementary School =

Kaʻū High, Intermediate & Pāhala Elementary School
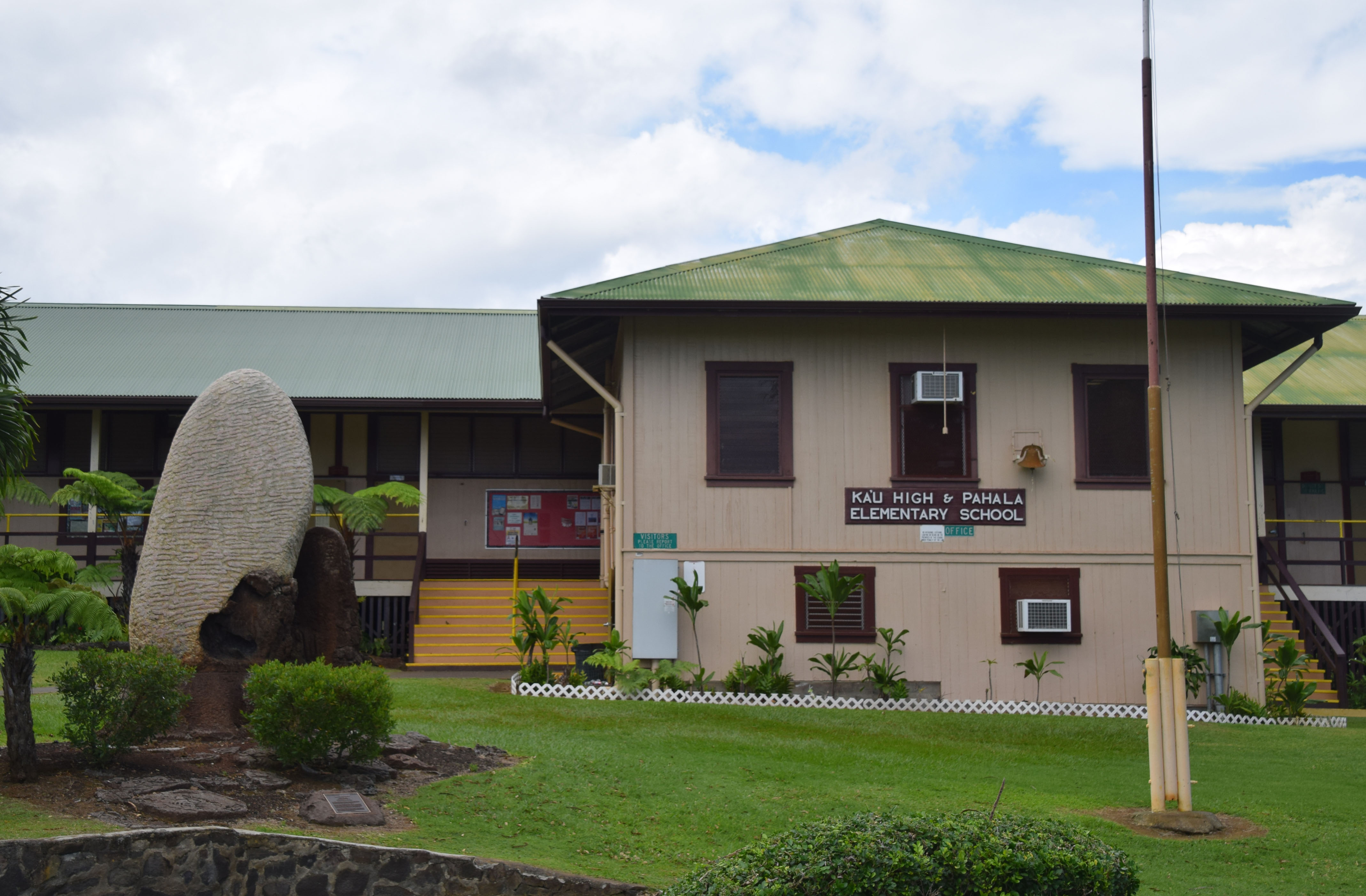
- Kaʻū High and Pāhala Elementary School

Location
- 96-3150 Pikake Street; Pahala, HI 96777

Information
- Type: public
- Established: 1881
- Principal: Sharon Beck
- Enrollment: 488 (2024–2025)
- Color: Maroon White
- Mascot: Trojan
- Accreditation: Western Association of Schools and Colleges
- Communities served: Rural
- Website: https://khpes.org

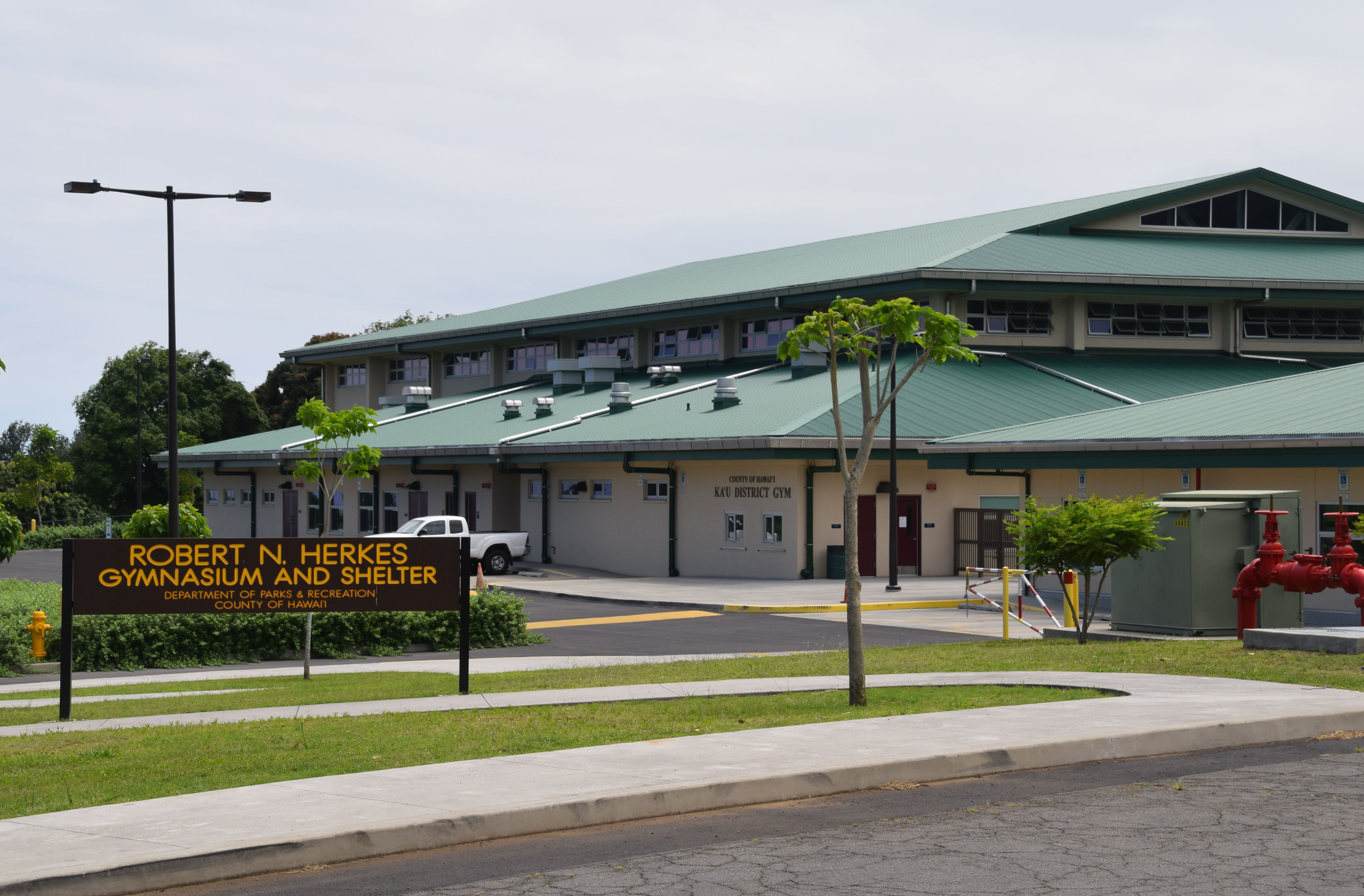
Kaʻū High and Pāhala Elementary School's Robert N. Herkes Gymnasium and Shelter

Kaʻū High & Pāhala Elementary School is a public, co-educational high school, middle school and elementary school of the Hawaii State Department of Education. It serves kindergarten through twelfth grade and was established in 1881. It was the first high school established on the Big Island of Hawaii and the third public high school established in Hawaii, after Lahainaluna High School on Maui and President William McKinley High School, formerly Honolulu High School, on Oʻahu. The high school was established after the 1876 opening of the Hawaiian Agricultural Company (a predecessor of the Ka'u Sugar Company), at the time one of the largest most remote sugarcane plantations in the Kingdom of Hawaii. The plantation employed a large number of immigrants who wanted their children to have a high school education; Honokaʻa High & Intermediate School was established on the north end of the island eight years later for similar reasons.

== General information ==
Kaʻū High and Pāhala Elementary School is located in Pāhala in Hawaiʻi County on the Island of Hawaiʻi. Its only feeder school is Naalehu Elementary School. Its mascot is the Trojan and the school colors are maroon and white.

== History ==
Pāhala High and Elementary School was started on June 11, 1881, for students of the rural Pāhala sugar community. The high school was established with a middle school and an elementary school. The original students were of Native Hawaiian, European, East Asian, and Pacific islander ancestries.

The original buildings on campus are still in use, including the main high school building, two other high school buildings, the gymnasium, the elementary school buildings and cafeteria. The H building and the G building are the original school buildings, dating back to 1881. In 1940, the school was renamed Kaʻū High and Pāhala Elementary School due to the drop in enrollment at Naalehu, which once had a high school. Kaʻū High and Pāhala Elementary School has one feeder school, Naalehu Elementary School, located in Naalehu, Hawaii, 13 miles (21 km) south. In the 2009-2010 school year, Naalehu Elementary School closed its middle school campus, making Kaʻu Intermediate the only middle school in the complex.

In 1881, the H and G buildings were built on campus. In 1909, the gymnasium and both elementary school buildings were constructed just south of the H and G buildings. A year later the main high school/administration building was completed along with a new athletic field in front of the school. A pool was constructed adjacent to the gymnasium in 1968. No new buildings were built on the campus until 1977, when the M building was completed. In 1980, a new Physical Education building with locker rooms (N building), along with a new lighted athletic field, was constructed. In 1982 the Agriculture building (I building) was completed. In 1991, the Industrial Arts building (Q building) was completed. The last building constructed is the F building, which was completed in 1999.

James Y. S. Kim had been principal of this school, but in 1971 he moved to another school, and Yoshio Nekoba became the principal.

In 2012, the County of Hawaiʻi began construction on a $17 million, 35,000 ft², shelter and gymnasium. The building was constructed on State-owned land previously used for athletic purposes. The new gymnasium opened in 2014. It seats 700 people, and serves as both a high school and community sports facility and a disaster shelter, during earthquakes, tsunamis, or intensive vog levels.

== Notable achievements ==
Kaʻū High School's ensemble group, One Journey, is noted for participating in and winning the 2011 "Brown Bags to Stardom" competition hosted by OC16 Television, on Oʻahu. Faced up against large, 5,000-student schools, the small community of Kaʻū (of a little over 6,000), with tremendous supporters and a great group, was able to pull the group to first place out of countless larger schools.

In 2022, students were awarded by the Hawaii State Department of Education for their agricultural work in the Ka'u Learning Lab.

In 2023, principal Sharon Beck was honored with the 17th Masayuki Tokioka Excellence in School Leadership Award, an award given out to school principals in the state who are considered outstanding. She was credited with increasing language arts and mathematics scores within the school. The award is named after Masayuki Tokioka.

== Uniforms ==
Kaʻū High School, Kaʻū Intermediate, and Pāhala Elementary, employ a dress code with uniforms.

In the elementary and intermediate schools, the uniform is a heather grey T-shirt with a maroon and white "Ka'u" logo on the front and smaller Hawaii island with a Trojan head on the back. A variation of this design in either black, or maroon shirts is available for the intermediate, and both black and maroon colors are also available as long-sleeved shirts.

The high school uniform employs a black or white T-shirt with a "tribal"-designed "Ka'u" going down the side of the front of the shirt. This is also available in a long-sleeved variation.

== Commencement ==
Kaʻū High and Pāhala Elementary School's commencement exercises are normally held during the first week of June.
