= Hualalai Academy =

- Kona, Hawaiʻi 96740; United States

Information
- Type: Private, College-prep
- Established: 1985
- Closed: 2014
- Grades: K–12
- Gender: Coeducational
- Website: web.archive.org/*/http://www.hualalai.org

Hualalai Academy, was a K–12 college preparatory school, it was the first accredited private, independent, K–12 school in the Districts of North and South Kona on the Big Island of Hawaiʻi.

== School history ==
Hualalai was founded in 1985 as a K–5 satellite of Hawaii Preparatory Academy in Waimea, by parents who wanted local education for their children, and business owners who needed to draw young professionals to the area.

=== Educational achievements ===
Since it became independent in 1996, Hualalai earned accreditation from the Hawaii Association of Independent Schools and the Western Association of Schools and Colleges, established a middle school and high school, and built a campus on 14.875 acres (60,200 m^{2}) that was certified a “Wildlife Habitat” by the National Wildlife Federation in 2007.

With a 9:1 student/teacher ratio, Hualalai students were encouraged to participate in state and national programs and have won recognition and numerous awards for academic achievement, athletic performance and artistic pursuits. Enrollment grew from 52 students in 1996 to about 190 in 2008.

=== School location ===
The school was located on the western slope of the Hualālai volcano, from which it gets its name. The campus is located at 74-4966 Kealakaʻa Street, Kailua-Kona, HI 96740, Coordinates 19°40′27.6″N 155°59′5.37″W.

=== School close ===
It was announced that the school would fold after the 2013–14 school year after filing for bankruptcy. Many contributing factors were attributed to their collapse, the main being the dwindling student body. Initially Kamehameha Schools were interested in the property and had reportedly put in a bid that was under consideration. After a few weeks Kamehameha Schools retracted their bid for unknown reasons. Makua Lani Christian Academy bought the 14-acre property in June 2014 and was able to move from their previous Holualoa campus in time for the 2014–15 academic school year. With the new campus, Makua Lani Christian Academy's enrollment jumped from eighty students to one hundred and twenty, with many being Hualalai Academy transfers.

== See also ==
- Hawaii Preparatory Academy
- Kamehameha Schools
- Kealakehe High School
