= Le Jardin Academy =

Location
- 917 Kalanianaʻole Highway; Kailua, Hawaiʻi 96734; 21.37924°N 157.7704749°W

Information
- Type: Private
- Religious affiliation: Nonaffiliated
- Established: 1961; 65 years ago
- CEEB code: 120139
- Head of School: Earl Kim
- Grades: PK–12
- Gender: Coeducational
- Enrollment: 922 (2025-2026 school year)
- Campus size: 24 acres
- Campus type: Suburban
- Colors: Blue, White, Silver and Green
- Athletics conference: ILH
- Team name: Bulldogs
- Accreditation: WASC; IBO
- Website: Le Jardin Academy

Le Jardin Academy (known informally as LJA) is a private, nonsectarian pre-kindergarten through grade 12 school located on the Windward Side of Oʻahu in the City and County of Honolulu, Hawaiʻi. Founded in 1961, it is the only school in Hawaiʻi authorized to offer the full International Baccalaureate (IB) continuum, encompassing the Primary Years Programme (PYP), Middle Years Programme (MYP), and Diploma Programme (DP) for students in grades PK–12.

The school is accredited by the Western Association of Schools and Colleges (WASC) and is a member of the National Association of Independent Schools (NAIS) and the Hawaii Association of Independent Schools (HAIS).

== History ==
Madame Henriette D. Neal founded a single-room preschool in 1961 at St. John's Lutheran Church in Kailua, originally known as Le Jardin d'Enfants. Madame Neal taught her students the French language. French is still taught at the school today and the fleur-de-lis appears in Le Jardin's logo.

After 1961 and for the next eight years, a new grade was added nearly every year. By 1975, the school's enrollment was more than 100 students, all in sixth grade or lower. In 1992, Le Jardin Academy merged with Windward Preparatory School and enrollment reached 462 students.

On August 30, 1999, the school opened its new campus on the former site of the Kailua Drive-In theater, which had closed in 1991. The Harold K.L. Castle Foundation donated this 24-acre site for the new Le Jardin Academy main campus. In 2001, Le Jardin added a high school in the same manner it had expanded in the 1960s, by adding a new grade each year, and in 2006 Le Jardin Academy celebrated its first high school graduating class. A new high school building and gymnasium were added to the main campus in 2008. The first cohort of students to earn the IB Diploma graduated in 2013.

== Academics ==
Le Jardin Academy offers the full International Baccalaureate continuum across three programmes. The Primary Years Programme (PYP) serves students in grades PK through 5, emphasizing inquiry-based learning and development of the whole child. The Middle Years Programme (MYP) covers grades 6 through 10, using an interdisciplinary framework to foster student agency and evidence-based learning. The Diploma Programme (DP), offered in grades 11 and 12, requires students to complete six subject-area courses alongside three core components: Theory of Knowledge (TOK), the Extended Essay, and Creativity, Activity, Service (CAS). Le Jardin hosts more than 100 college admissions officer visits annually.

Le Jardin Academy also participates in the Global Citizen Diploma (GCD) consortium, a program through which students develop a deep understanding of their individual values and a commitment to responsible global citizenship.

The school also offers instruction in Chinese, French, Japanese, and Spanish from Pre-K through Grade 12.

=== Experiential Education ===
Le Jardin Academy operates a structured experiential education program called Impact Term (I-Term), an annual immersive learning experience lasting one week to twelve days depending on the course. Unlike conventional field trips or travel programs, I-Term is designed as a core curricular structure in which experiences serve as the primary medium of learning rather than a supplement to classroom instruction. Each course is built around essential questions, learning outcomes, community partnerships, and a final public demonstration of learning called a Hoʻike.

Courses are organized across four thematic Impact Academies: Aloha ʻĀina (environmental stewardship), Global Citizenship, Peace and Pilina (relationships), and Arts and Innovation. Students participate in course co-design, itinerary development, and risk management. Past I-Term courses have included ecological field study in New Zealand, cultural exchange at Yokohama International School in Japan, wilderness expedition in Homer, Alaska, and a Model United Nations program in London.

The program aligns with the International Baccalaureate philosophy, directly supporting MYP Approaches to Learning (ATL), the IB Diploma Programme's Creativity, Activity, and Service (CAS) requirement, and the habits of inquiry associated with the Extended Essay. An independent educational evaluation concluded that I-Term "is a serious experiential curriculum with strong educational legitimacy" whose design reflects the conditions associated with meaningful learning: authentic tasks, student agency, interdisciplinary application, structured reflection, and transfer into unfamiliar settings. All secondary students participate in service learning annually.

== Academic Outcomes ==
Le Jardin Academy graduates have been accepted to several prestigious universities, including Brown University, the University of California, the University of Chicago, Cornell University, Dartmouth College, Duke University, Georgetown University, Harvard University, the University of Oxford, the University of Pennsylvania, Stanford University, and Yale University.

Members of the Class of 2024–25 submitted 542 applications to 164 unique colleges and universities. Ninety-eight percent of secondary students were enrolled in the IB Diploma Programme, with the highest individual diploma score reaching 41 points. Ninety-six percent of graduates enrolled in post-secondary institutions, and the class earned a combined $3.2 million in first-year college scholarships.

== Campus ==
Le Jardin has a Kailua address but is not in the Kailua census-designated place. The school's 24-acre campus is located along Kalaninanaʻole Highway on the Windward Side of Oʻahu, adjacent to the Kawainui Marsh, one of Hawaiʻi's largest freshwater wetlands. Facilities include a swimming pool, gymnasium, tennis court, basketball court, athletic field, libraries, and art and design spaces. A new Arts and Innovations Center opened in January 2026.

== Athletics ==
Le Jardin Academy competes in the Interscholastic League of Honolulu (ILH) under the team name the Bulldogs. The school colors are blue, white, silver, and green. Interscholastic sports include basketball, cross country, girls flag football, golf, kayaking, paddling, sailing, football, judo, soccer, surfing, swimming, tennis, track and field, water polo, volleyball, softball, and wrestling. Seventy-four percent of students participate in at least one sport.
