= Hawaii Academy of Arts and Sciences =

Public charter school in Pāhoa County, Hawaii, US

Location
- 15-1397 Post Office Rd; Pāhoa, Hawaiʻi County, Hawaiʻi 96778; United States
- 19.501260°N 154.944463°W

Information
- Type: Public, Charter
- Established: 2001
- Director: Steve Hirakami
- Grades: K–12
- Gender: Coeducational
- Enrollment: 637 (2013-14)
- Campus type: Rural
- Colors: Silver, Blue
- Athletics conference: BIIF
- Website: www.haaspcs.org

The Hawaii Academy of Arts and Science (HAAS) is a charter school based in Pahoa, Hawaii. It was founded on June 21, 2001, and serves grades K-12. The governing board chairperson is Michael Dodge, and the current principal is Steve Hirakami. The school has been accredited by the Western Association of Schools and Colleges (WASC) since 2008.

== Academics ==
The school uses a variety of learning styles and curriculum to suit student needs. Programs are aligned with Hawaii Content and Performance and Hawaii Common Core standards. In physical learning programs, classes usually average 16-24 students.

=== Elementary programs ===
There are a variety of different programs for elementary students, with many of them looping between different grades each year.

The Aloha Academy is a program which loops between first and second grades, and third and fourth grades each year. Students in these programs learn standard based instruction, with inclusion of visual arts, STEAM, gardening, and Hawaiiana in the curriculum.

The Beach Academy is a program which integrates hands-on instruction, with inclusion of art, handwork, Hawaiiana, music, games, and drama into the curriculum. This program loops between first and second grades each year.

The Discovery Heights is a program which is supported by field trips, Hawaiiana, music, and STEAM. The program loops between third and fourth grades, and fifth and sixth grades each year.
