= Honolulu Waldorf School =

Private school in Hawaii, United States

Coordinates: 21.279003°N 157.787040°W

Information
- Established: 1961; 65 years ago
- Enrollment: c.90

The Honolulu Waldorf School is a coeducational, independent school serving approximately 150 students from early childhood through eighth grade. Established in 1961, the school is located in Niu Valley on the island of Oʻahu in the state of Hawaiʻi. It is fully accredited by the Western Association of Schools and Colleges (WASC), the Hawaiʻi Association of Independent Schools (HAIS), and the Association of Waldorf Schools of North America (AWSNA).

== History ==
Honolulu Waldorf School was founded in 1961 by Zena Schuman, Betty C. Wilson, Eric Wakefield, J. Edwin Whitlow, and Peter Lee, a group inspired by the educational philosophy of Rudolf Steiner. With assistance from Clorinda and Charles Lucas, the group secured a parcel of land in Niu Valley to establish the campus. The Hawaiian name for the school, Kula Ho‘omohala Pua, meaning "school of the blossoming child," was bestowed by Reverend Abraham Akaka.

== Curriculum ==
The school offers a comprehensive Waldorf curriculum that emphasizes developmental appropriateness, artistic integration, and experiential learning.

Early Childhood Programs

- Parent Child Program: Designed for children under age 3 and their caregivers, this program introduces Waldorf early childhood principles through activities such as outdoor play, singing games, puppet stories, and parenting discussions.
- Preschool (Ages 2-4): The preschool program emphasizes socialization, rhythm, and play-based learning in a home-like environment. Activities include baking, painting, music, and nature exploration.
- Mixed-Age Kindergarten (Ages 4-6): This full-day program fosters imagination, creativity, and social responsibility through storytelling, puppet plays, artistic activities, and meaningful work. Older students, called "Sun Children," are given leadership roles and special projects.

Grades 1–8

Waldorf education follows a developmental model, integrating academics with artistic and practical experiences. Each school day begins with a Main Lesson block lasting approximately two hours, during which students focus intensively on a core subject for several weeks. Subjects rotate throughout the year and are presented through storytelling, arts, and hands-on projects. Each grade performs a class play tying into the curriculum focus for that year.

Middle School (Grades 6–8)

The middle school program emphasizes interdisciplinary learning, critical thinking, and social-emotional growth. Students explore complex topics such as the Industrial Revolution, scientific principles, and systems of governance. They develop public speaking, leadership, and collaborative skills through hands-on projects and community engagement.

Subject Classes

Students participate in world languages (Japanese and Spanish), music (strings or band), handwork, painting, movement, and Na Mea Hawai‘i.

Festivals and Community Activities

Students engage in seasonal festivals such as Michaelmas, May Day, and Winter festivals. Each class performs a play, and students participate in excursions and overnight trips tailored to developmental needs. Middle schoolers undertake service projects and field trips that promote independence and social responsibility.

Schedule

School begins at 7:55 a.m. and ends at 2:45 p.m., with early dismissal at 2:00 p.m. on Wednesdays.

== Administration ==
The Honolulu Waldorf School organizational structure is set up to serve the community of children, teachers, parents and friends.

== Notable alumni ==
- Taimane Gardner, ukulele musician

== See also ==
- Waldorf education
- Curriculum of the Waldorf schools
- List of high schools in Hawaii
- Interscholastic League of Honolulu
