= Niʻihau High and Elementary School =

School in Hawaii, United States

Coordinates: 21.90170°N 160.20095°W

Niʻihau High & Elementary School, or Niʻihau Island School, is a public K-12 school on the island of Niʻihau in Hawaii. It is operated by the Hawaii Department of Education.

In 2007 the school had on average about 30 students, though it is common for them to go back and forth between Niʻihau and Kauaʻi, so not every student will be present each day.

Prior to 2007, the facility relied on generators for electricity. As power was not constant, the use of computers was problematic, and students mostly ate canned food instead of fresh food. In 2007 a 72-battery, 80 solar panel photovoltaic solar power system was introduced at a cost of $207,000. A rock wall windbreak prevented wind from interfering. The power count was 10.4 kW. It was the first school in Hawaii relying on this system.
