= NIGP Code =

NIGP Commodity/Services Code
- Industry: Government procurement, Training, Procurement software, Data Services, State & Local Government, Higher Education
- Headquarters: Austin, TX
- Key people: Marcheta Gillespie, President, NIGP Code Services; John Walters, NIGP Program Director
- Products: NIGP Code; NIGP Living Code; NIGP Coding Service; UNSPSC Crosswalk; NAICS Crosswalk; MCC Crosswalk; NIGP Consulting; NIGP Code Webinar; NIGP Code Usage Reviews; NIGP Code Reference Books
- Website: http://www.nigp.com

The NIGP Commodity/Services Code is an acronym for the National Institute of Governmental Purchasings' Commodity/Services Code. The NIGP Code is a coding taxonomy used primarily to classify products and services procured by state and local governments in North America.

The classification system was developed in the mid-1980s as a result of efforts by public procurement officials in Texas, Oklahoma, Florida, Illinois and other states, cities and counties to provide a mechanism to classify the products and services that used in public procurement. Led by Homer Forrestor, the Director of General Services in Texas, the group produced the initial codeset in 1983.

The copyright for the data file was transferred to the National Institute of Governmental Purchasing (NIGP), an organization founded in 1944, and the NIGP Code was born. The NIGP Code is now the standard taxonomy for classifying commodities and services for 33 states and thousands of local entities within North America (utilized by entities in 47 states, plus the District of Columbia, Canada, and Puerto Rico).

NIGP appointed Periscope Holdings, Inc., as the custodian of the NIGP Code in 2001. The firm is responsible for licensing, overseeing code change requests, publication of version releases, communication with end users, phone support, training, integrity of the codeset, and commodity coding services for the conversion of contract and inventory files.

The NIGP Code is most commonly used to classify vendors and to track spending data for use in strategic sourcing and spending analysis. The database is often incorporated into the procurement software utilized by the entity for use in e-procurement. Categorization, reporting, and transparency are all key goals and benefits of this coding structure. The NIGP Code currently exists in English and Spanish versions. Cross references have been created for the NAICS, UNSPSC and MCC codesets. Version 24 is the current release for printed materials.

== NIGP Code structure ==
The NIGP Code is structured as follows:

3-Digit Class Code The 3-Digit class Code has a brief general description. This level contains 219 Commodity (Product) Classes and 55 Service Classes totaling 274 Classes. The 3-Digit Code is primarily used to generate periodic expenditure history by department for fiscal planning, budget execution, and accounting.

5-Digit Class-Item Code The 5-Digit class-item Code is an expanded version of the 3-Digit class Code. Currently, it contains over 8,700 descriptions. This level categorizes vendors by class-item to allow your procurement software to automate bidder selection, produce no-bid response reports, vendor performance reports, and minority business and HUB reports by Code. Purchase history can be captured at this level as well.

7-Digit Class-Item-Group Code The 7-Digit Code provides an additional level of purchase description. It contains over 29,000 descriptions. It can be used to develop a specification file and is used with the 11-Digit Code to create a comprehensive purchase description.

11-Digit Class-Item-Group-Detail Code The 11-Digit Code is generally used to create, manage, and maintain line-item term contracts. It is also used to identify stock items in inventory. This level of the Code currently contains over 250,000 descriptions which provides a great amount of flexibility when creating contracts and tracking inventory.

Code Structure	Sample Code	Sample Description
3-Digit (Class) Code	620	Office Supplies: Erasers, Inks, Leads, Pens, Pencils, etc.
5-Digit (Class-Item) Code	620-80	Pens (General Writing Types): Ball Point, Nylon Tip, etc.
7-Digit (Class-Item-Group) Code	620-80-21	Pens, Ball Point, Retractable, Refillable, All Plastic Barrel W/Metal Pocket Clip
11-Digit (Class-Item-Group-Detail) Code	620-80-21-035-4	Fine Point, Black Ink, 12/Box
	620-80-21-045-3	Fine Point, Blue Ink, 12/Box
	620-80-21-065-1	Fine Point, Green Ink, 12/Box
	620-80-21-075-0	Fine Point, Red Ink, 12/Box

== NIGP Code access ==
The NIGP Code can be accessed in several ways. The most common is via the NIGP Code web search tool, the NIGP Living Code, which hosts a search engine for the Code for end users. The site also has a download section, which provides for end user download of the entire codeset or modifications to the codeset since the last download by the user. The download file can be formatted as an Excel, tab-delimited or CSV file. In addition, the Code is available via printed format in the Alphabetical Index Book and the Class Item Book.

== NIGP Code maintenance ==
Maintenance and additions/clarifications to the Code come from three primary sources: codes generated by direct customer requests, codes identified as part of coding services, and codes identified from seated working groups. Additions/clarifications at the 3 and 5 digit level are typically processed within 24 hours. Code requests targeted at the 7 and 11 digit levels typically are processed within 2–3 days, although codes can be generated within 24 hours under certain circumstances.

Updates to the Code are published weekly to the nigp.com site for download by users. Codes requested directly from users are typically delivered via extract files to the user, with general release of the new codes in the weekly website update.

== Environmentally certified codes ==
In 2009, the NIGP Code went green by classifying items that fit sustainable procurement and providing a tool for reporting on green spend. The Code was updated to identify “environmentally certified” products, which have been set up as a green counterpart of standard classes. There is a set of 10 initial Class Code selections that cover everything from computer accessories to janitorial supplies to paper products. This initial set of codes was determined by a Code Green Workgroup that was made up of representatives from states, cities, counties, schools, and Green Seal.

Code subscribers are currently utilizing the codes in their reporting of Sustainable Procurement and/or Environmentally Preferable Purchasing initiatives. Product types that are currently covered include janitorial supplies, office supplies, computer software, computer hardware, paint, and paper products.

== See also ==
- Government procurement
- Buyer leverage
- Contract Management
- E-procurement
- Global sourcing
- Purchasing
- Procurement software
- Spend management
- Rate contract
- Reverse auction
- Spending analysis
- Strategic sourcing
- Turnkey
- Tendering
- Auction
