= The Comics Curmudgeon =

American blog

- Website type: Blog
- Available in: English
- Owner: Josh Fruhlinger
- Creator: Josh Fruhlinger
- Website: www.joshreads.com
- Registration: none
- Launched: July 11, 2004
- Current status: Active

The Comics Curmudgeon is an American blog devoted to humorous and critical analysis of newspaper comics. Its author, Josh Fruhlinger, is a freelance writer and editor based in Los Angeles.

== Content ==
For each blog post, author Josh Fruhlinger selects two to eight comic strips for comment, usually focused on topics such as poor artwork, inappropriate coloring, nonsensical plots, and sexual subtext or innuendo. Long-running soap opera-style comic strips such as Apartment 3-G, Mark Trail, and Mary Worth bear the brunt of Fruhlinger's humor, an emphasis that he attributes to their being "[the] perfect targets for the sort of metatextual detached irony that is our generation's terrible contribution to Western civilization."

Fruhlinger's blog also features commentary on long-running legacy cartoons like Family Circus and B.C.. Weekly "metaposts" update readers on notable events in Fruhlinger's life, such as his July 22, 2008, appearance on the game show Jeopardy!, offer critical commentary on the comic strip industry, and include a "Comment Of The Week" that highlights the best comments posted by the blog's readers. The blog's original name was "Josh Reads the Comics so You Don't Have To", which is reflected in the site URL, joshreads.com.

== Impact ==
The Comics Curmudgeon was among the blogs criticizing what they deemed the declining quality of the Canadian family strip For Better or For Worse, and who were noted for "harsh attacks" on creator Lynn Johnston. Humorist John Hodgman, in a review of comic-strip reprint collections, said the website "regularly ridicules the creaky war horses like Hagar the Horrible [sic] and Mary Worth, the opaque woolgathering of Ziggy, the dull crypto-evangelism of B.C." A blog contributor's July 21, 2008, post broke the news that a recent Blondie strip had been recycled almost verbatim from one published in 1952. This was followed in March 2009 with a similar report of strip recycling in Family Circus.

Hägar the Horrible's cartoonist Chris Browne, Liō artist/writer Mark Tatulli, and Sally Forth scripter Francesco Marciuliano have commented on the blog. Bob Weber Jr., artist for Slylock Fox, created merchandise for the Curmudgeon CafePress store with original art of the character Cassandra Cat (from the Fox strip).

On December 18, 2008, the comic strip Archie began occasionally referencing the blog's recurring "Archie Joke-Generating Laugh Unit 3000" joke, in which the strip is allegedly written by a sentient computer program which continually tries (but fails) to understand genuine human interaction. On August 12, 2009, writer and illustrator Stephan Pastis mentioned The Comics Curmudgeon by name in his comic strip Pearls Before Swine, in the context of satirizing internet criticism. On May 6, 2012, the comic strip Crock introduced a character named "Freerloiter" (an apparent parody of Fruhlinger's name) who lost all of his artistic talent after a lobotomy. However, Commander Crock "pulled the plug" on Freerloiter after he announced his intention to move to Baltimore and start a comics blog. Fruhlinger responded on his blog: "Of course, if you aren't me or part of the fairly small slice of the comics-reading public who also reads my blog, this strip would make exactly zero sense to you. Just another Sunday Crock, in other words." Crock concluded publishing new strips two weeks later.

=== Awards ===
The Comics Curmudgeon was ranked 13th on PC Magazine's 100 Favorite Blogs list for 2007, and Elite Choice named it one of 2007's Top 125 Elite Blogs (judged on traffic generation, Alexa ranking and other measures of visibility). Josh Fruhlinger was named 2007's Blogger of the Year by The Week based on his analysis of editorial cartoons. The Comics Curmudgeon has also won the 2008 Weblog Award for Best Humor Blog.
