= Industrial Internet =

Industrial Internet may refer to:

- Industrial Internet of Things, interconnected devices for industrial applications
- The technology stack for Industry 4.0
- A subject of the ISO 25500-1 standard "Supply chain interoperability and integration — Part 1: Overview and principles of the industrial internet"
