= OTIF =

OTIF may refer to:

- Intergovernmental Organisation for International Carriage by Rail (from French: Organisation intergouvernementale pour les Transports Internationaux Ferroviaires)
- On time in full, a logistics performance measurement which indicates how many deliveries are supplied on time without any article missing, also known as DIFOT (delivery in full, on time)
