= Coupa =

American software company

Coupa Software Incorporated
- Type: Private
- Traded as: Nasdaq: COUP (2016–2023)
- Industry: Internet Software & Services
- Founded: 2006; 20 years ago
- Founders: Dave Stephens; Noah Eisner
- Headquarters: Foster City, California, U.S.
- Area served: Worldwide
- Key people: Leagh Turner (CEO); Mike Agresta (CFO); Salvatore Lombardo; (CPTO)
- Products: spend management software, procurement, sourcing, travel & expense, treasury & payments, supply chain design
- Owner: Thoma Bravo
- Website: coupa.com

Coupa Software Incorporated is an American technology platform for AI-driven total spend management and supply chain. The company is headquartered in Foster City, California with offices throughout Europe, Latin America, and Asia Pacific. Coupa helps companies gain visibility into and control over how they spend money, optimize supply chains, and manage cash.

In 2016, Coupa Software went public on the Nasdaq, trading as COUP. It was taken private by Thoma Bravo in February 2023. Leagh Turner became CEO of Coupa in November 2023.

== History ==
Dave Stephens and Noah Eisner founded Coupa in 2006. Rob Bernshteyn took over as Coupa's CEO in February 2009. In September 2009, Coupa secured a $7.5 million Series C funding round.

In May, Ariba, a unit of SAP and a competitor of Coupa, filed a lawsuit alleging that Coupa misappropriated Ariba trade secrets. Also in 2014, the company expanded globally, announcing new operations in Dublin, Ireland.

In February 2015, Coupa acquired the assets of ZenPurchase, an enterprise procurement software company, as well as acquiring InvoiceSmash, an e-invoicing vendor, and TripScanner, an open booking vendor, in July. On September 24, 2015, Ariba and Coupa settled their lawsuit. Coupa acknowledged its possession of Ariba information and is required to abide by certain procedures to prevent any misappropriation in the future. Coupa paid Ariba an undisclosed amount.

In January 2016, Coupa acquired Contractually, a cloud-based contract management solution.

In 2020, Coupa acquired AI supply chain design company LLamasoft.

In 2021, Coupa debuted its new venture capital fund, Coupa Ventures.

In May 2022, Coupa added analysis features to its procurement management software to track Scope 1, 2 and 3 emissions reductions and how these contribute to supplier sustainability goals.

In December 2022, Thoma Bravo outbid Vista Equity Partners to announce its acquisition of Coupa for $6.15 billion in cash, and a total enterprise value of $8 billion.

=== Leadership ===
In May 2023, Rob Bernshteyn departed as CEO after 14 years as CEO and chairman; Leagh Turner subsequently became CEO of Coupa in November 2023. Turner most recently served as co-CEO of Ceridian.

In September 2024, Salvatore Lombardo joined the company as Chief Product and Technology Officer.

== Technology ==
Coupa’s public cloud-based total spend management manages transactions across procurement, payment, and supply chain. Coupa's platform, through its community-generated AI, leverages $7 trillion of direct and indirect spending in anonymized customer data, making agentic AI recommendations for improving business decisions. The collection of this data provides community-powered KPIs, including Caterpillar, The Coca-Cola Company, Adidas, Amazon, BNP Paribas, TD Bank, and Microsoft.

In 2006, its first free open-source product, Coupa Express, was built using RoR. In 2007, the company launched a SaaS (Software-as-a-service) product called Coupa On Demand for SMBs (small and midsize businesses).

In November 2011, Coupa released its first spend analysis product called Coupa Spend Optimizer.

In April 2014, Coupa introduced Coupa Inventory, a portal for viewing inventory availability when ordering, to reduce wasteful spending.

With Coupa's acquisition of LLamasoft in 2020, the company added AI-powered supply chain design to its platform.

In February 2022, Coupa launched Community.ai, which benchmarks data to embed performance feedback, operational support, and prescriptive recommendations. Coupa received its FedRAMP Moderate certification in March 2022.

In 2023, the “Coupa supply chain collaboration solution” was introduced; this direct spend management solution creates a collaboration layer between buyers and suppliers on the platform in order to decrease operational business risks.

In September 2024, Coupa Navi was launched, a generative AI agent that provides real-time navigation and support for business queries. Contract Intelligence was also released, which is powered by AI to provide risk-informed clause recommendations, legal agreement summaries, and automated record keeping.

In 2024, Coupa’s CPTO announced the development of an autonomous “AI agent” network to manage data objects, interact with buyers and sellers, and provide transaction recommendations as needed.
