= Admiral Arthur W. Radford High School =

Location
- 4361 Salt Lake Boulevard; Honolulu, Hawaii 96818; United States

Information
- Type: Public
- Motto: "Discipline, Respect, Responsibility"
- Established: 1957
- School district: Hawaii Department of Education – Central Oahu
- Principal: James Sunday
- Teaching staff: 69.00 (FTE)
- Grades: 9-12
- Gender: Co-educational
- Enrollment: 1,231 (2023–2024)
- Student to teacher ratio: 17.84
- Campus: Suburban
- Colors: Black; White; Red Trim
- Athletics: Oahu Interscholastic Association (White Division)
- Mascot: Ram (Pappy)
- Rivals: Moanalua High School & Aiea High School
- Accreditation: Western Association of Schools and Colleges
- Newspaper: The RamPage
- Yearbook: Ka Po'e Ae'a (Wanderer)
- Newsletter: The Admiral
- Military: United States Navy JROTC

Admiral Arthur W. Radford High School, known as Radford High School, is a coeducational college preparatory public high school in the City and County of Honolulu, Hawaii.

== Basic information ==
The school is named after Navy Admiral Arthur William Radford who served as Commander-in-Chief of the United States Pacific Command after WWII. Radford High School was established in 1957 and graduated its first senior class in June 1960. It is fully accredited by the Western Association of Schools and Colleges. The school is located on 27 acres of land on Salt Lake Boulevard, outside of the Aliamanu Military Reservation. The campus has a bronze sculpture entitled Striving for Excellence by Jan Gordon Fisher. Radford serves a community of approximately 30,000 people. Its students are ethnically diverse and about 63% military dependents, resulting in a yearly transiency rate of about one-third.

Boundaries

The school community is within a one-mile radius of Joint Base Pearl Harbor–Hickam, Foster Village and Aliamanu. Radford High School's boundary encompasses the following civilian housing areas: Aliamanu, Alii Plantation, Crosspointe, and Foster Village. It encompasses the following military housing areas: Hokulani, Ohana Nui, Hickam Air Force Base, Catlin Park, Ford Island, Hale Moku, Halsey Terrace, Little Makalapa, Makalapa, Moanalua Terrace, Pearl Harbor Shipyard Quarters, and most of Aliamanu Military Reservation Housing.

The Military Youth Advisory Council (MYAC)

MYAC is the school's primary community group and comprises school leaders, three military commands, Family Service Centers, business and civilian leaders, PTSO representatives, students, and community college liaisons. The council addresses most issues affecting its population, meeting monthly on the Radford campus. It is a highly functional, comprehensive partnership that has resulted in many helpful programs and improvements for Radford students and has solved many campus/community issues.

== School complex area information ==
Radford High School is part of the Hawaii Department of Education Aiea-Moanalua-Radford Complex Area in the Central Oahu District along with Aiea High School and Moanalua High School.

The Radford Complex consists of 7 elementary schools, 1 middle school, and 1 high school:

- Aliamanu Elementary School
- Hickam Elementary School
- Makalapa Elementary School
- Mokulele Elementary School
- Nimitz Elementary School
- Pearl Harbor Elementary School
- Pearl Harbor Kai Elementary School
- Aliamanu Middle School
- Radford High School

== Curriculum ==
Radford offers various co-curricular activities. These include student government, class-level activities, honor societies, service clubs, special interest clubs, and interscholastic athletics.

== Academics ==
Radford offers courses such as Japanese language, introduction to industrial engineering, forensic science, entrepreneurship, marine science, language arts courses for the gifted and talented, two advanced placement courses in each core area, the Multimedia Program under the Arts and Communications Career Pathway, a Junior Reserve Officers' Training Corps program, a Freshman Academy, a Culinary Arts Academy, a Building and Construction Academy, and many other electives.

Radford maintains several comprehensive student support programs. The Student Transition Center provides new student orientation, a "lunch buddy" program, and a tutorial program for those students who need extra study assistance. The Discovery Center assists students with job preparation and placement. The College and Career Resource Center helps students with college searches and applications.

The school offers a music program that includes a concert band, made up of less experienced players, a symphonic band, for those with more training, an orchestra, a chorus, a guitar class, and a marching band. The Radford "Rams" Marching Band began in the early 1970s and continued through the early '90s when it ceased to exist. In 2008, the new music director, Nicole Sherlock, revived the marching band and students voted to change the name to Radford "Red Brigade" Marching Band. By 2013, the drumline had established itself as one of the top drumlines in the state of Hawaii.

== Navy Junior Reserve Officers Training Corps Unit ==
The Navy Junior Reserve Officers Training Corps unit offers extracurricular activities such as armed and unarmed drill teams, FOX team, and a PT team among other activities within the unit. Students enrolled in the program take Naval Science courses and have opportunities to attend many functions on the nearby Joint Base Pearl Harbor–Hickam. The battalion is currently headed by Senior Naval Science Instructor LCDR. Romelda Sadiarin (USN Ret).

== Sports ==
OIA TITLES
Sport	Championship Years
Baseball	1961, 1979, 2010 (Div. II), 2011 (Div. II), 2019 (Div. II)
Basketball (boys)	1962, 1965, 1969, 1971, 1972, 1973, 1977, 1978, 1989
Basketball (girls)	2011 (Div. II), 2012 (Div. II)
Cheerleading	2003, 2004, 2007, 2008, 2009, 2010, 2012, 2013
Cross Country (boys)	1975, 1976, 1977, 1978, 1979, 1980, 1981, 1982, 1983, 1985, 1995, 1998, 2002, 2013
Cross Country (girls)	1974, 1975, 1976, 1977, 1979, 1980, 1981, 2005, 2016
Football	1961, 1962, 1969, 1976, 1981, 2005 (Div. II), 2012 (Div. II), 2015 (Div. II)
Golf (boys)	1965, 1966, 1967, 1981
Soccer (boys)	1966, 2022 (Div. II)
Soccer (girls)	2013 (Div. II)
Softball (girls)	2026 (Div. II)
Swimming & Diving (boys)	1962, 1963, 1964, 1967, 1968, 1969, 1970, 1976, 1977, 1982, 1983
Swimming & Diving (girls)	1967, 1968, 1977, 1978, 1983, 1984, 1992
Tennis (girls)	1972, 1975
Track & Field (boys)	1969, 1972, 1974, 1975, 1976, 1978, 1979, 1980, 1981, 1982, 1983, 1984, 1985, 1986, 1989, 1995, 1996, 1998, 2011, 2012, 2019
Track & Field (girls)	1961, 1962, 1963, 1970, 1973, 1974, 1975, 1976, 1980, 1981, 1982, 1983, 2009, 2010, 2012
Volleyball (boys)	2023 (Div. II)
Volleyball (girls)	1971, 1980, 2005 (Div. II), 2013 (Div. II)
Wrestling (boys)	1970, 1971, 1974, 1975, 1976, 1977, 1989
Wrestling (girls)	1997

HHSAA STATE TITLES
Sport	Championship Years
Baseball	1979
Basketball (boys)	1969, 1971, 1977, 1989
Basketball (girls)	2011 (Div. II)
Cheerleading	2005 (Medium Division), 2006 (Med. Div.), 2007 (Med. Div.), 2008 (Med. Div.), 2009 (Med. Div.), 2010 (Med. Div.), 2011 (Large Div.), 2012 (Large Div.), 2013 (Large Div.), 2014 (Large Div.), 2015 (Med. Div.), 2021 (Med. Div.), 2023 (Coed Div.), 2024 (Coed Div.), 2025 (Coed Div.)
Cross Country (boys)	1974, 1975, 1976, 1977, 1979, 1980, 1982
Cross Country (girls)	1975, 1976, 1977, 1980, 2024 (Div.I)
Football	1981 (Prep Bowl), 2015 (Div. II)
Golf (boys)	1966, 1967
Track & Field (boys)	1982, 1985
Track & Field (girls)	1973, 1974, 1975, 1976, 1980
Volleyball (boys)	2025 (Div II)
Volleyball (girls)	1971
Wrestling (boys)	1971, 1974, 1975, 1976, 1977, 1980

== Notable alumni ==
Listed alphabetically by last name (year of graduation):

- Stephen Akina (1988) – classical pianist, television and film score composer
- Burl Burlingame (1971) – journalist, historian, published author
- Celita De Castro (1972) – Miss Hawaii USA 1977 and top 12 semi-finalist (9th place) Miss USA 1977
- D. M. W. Greer (1975) - playwright
- Gary Hooser (1972) – Kaua'i County Council member 1998–2002; Hawaii Senate Majority Leader and State Senator representing the Islands of Kaua'i and Ni'ihau 2003–2010
- Wayne Hunter (1999) – NFL football player, offensive lineman Seattle Seahawks, Jacksonville Jaguars, New York Jets, and St. Louis Rams
- Kevin Jennings - education administrator
- Melveen Leed (1961) – singer, musician, vocal instructor
- Ashley Lelie (1998) – NFL football player, wide receiver Denver Broncos, Atlanta Falcons, San Francisco 49ers, and Oakland Raiders
- Craig MacIntosh (1962) – illustrator of Sally Forth (syndicated strip) and Doodles (comic strip)
- Bette Midler (1963) – singer, actress, comedian
- Nadine Nakamura (Maeda) (1979) (D, Hanalei-Princeville-Kapaa) – Member of the Hawaii House of Representatives since 2016, Majority Leader since 2022, selected in 2024 as first woman speaker of the state House
- Brian Norwood (1983) – Baylor University Assistant Head Coach (2008–2015), University of Tulsa Co-defensive coordinator (2015–2017), Kansas State University - Co-defensive coordinator and defensive backs coach (2018), Navy - Co-defensive coordinator and safeties coach (2019)University of California, Los Angeles - Assistant head coach / Defensive backfield coach (2020–present)
- Ken Niumatalolo (1983) – U.S. Naval Academy Football – Head Coach (2007–2022), San Jose State University - Head Coach (2024)
- Ciana Pelekai (2018) – Miss Hawaii Teen America and Miss Teen America 2017, singer and contestant on "America's Got Talent" and "The Voice"
- Jim Phillips (1964) – three-time U.S. Champion surfer, 1998 Surfing Hall of Fame inductee, designer/builder of custom surfboards
- Mark "Hawkeye" Louis Rybczyk (1979) – disc jockey on Dallas/Fort Worth country music radio station KSCS 96.3 FM
- Velega Savali (1962) – politician, Treasurer of American Samoa (2005–2008)
- Loretta Ables Sayre (1976) – singer, actress, entertainer
- Brian Shul (1966) – USAF fighter pilot, SR-71 Blackbird pilot, published author and photographer
- Steve Thel (1972) – academic and lawyer
- Rob Todd - former member of the Houston City Council
- Jeris White (1970) – NFL football player, corner back, Miami Dolphins, Tampa Bay Buccaneers and Super Bowl XVII champion Washington Redskins
- Judith Wolski (1965) – Miss Hawaii USA 1966 and top 15 semi-finalist (8th place) Miss USA 1966
