= Strategic sourcing =

Developing channels of supply at the lowest total cost

Strategic sourcing is the process of developing channels of supply at the lowest total cost, not just the lowest purchase price. It expands upon traditional organisational purchasing activities to embrace all activities within the procurement cycle, from specification to receipt, payment for goods and services to sourcing production lines where the labor market would increase firms' ROI. Strategic sourcing processes aim for continuous improvement and re-evaluation of the purchasing activities of an organisation.

In the services industry, strategic sourcing refers to a service solution, sometimes called a strategic partnership, which is specifically customized to meet the client's individual needs. In a production environment, it is often considered one component of supply chain management. Modern supply chain management professionals have placed emphasis on defining the distinct differences between strategic sourcing and procurement. Procurement operations support tactical day-to-day transactions such as issuing purchase orders to suppliers, whereas strategic sourcing represents to strategic planning, supplier development, contract negotiation, supply chain infrastructure, and outsourcing models.

== Use of the term ==
The term "strategic sourcing" was popularized through work with a variety of blue chip companies by a number of consulting firms in the late 1980s and early to mid 1990s. This methodology has become the norm for procurement departments in large, sophisticated companies such as Fortune 500 companies.

A United States federal memorandum issued in 2005 emphasised the collaborative and structured nature of strategic sourcing for government departments, defining the process as one of "critically analyzing an organisation's spending and using this information to make business decisions about acquiring commodities and services more effectively and efficiently". The memorandum saw each agency's chief acquisition officer, chief financial officer and chief information officer as central to this collaborative process, and anticipated that by 1 October 2015 each agency would identify at least three commodities which "could be purchased more effectively and efficiently through the application of strategic sourcing".

== Steps ==
The key steps in a continuous strategic sourcing process were defined by Japanese writer Toshihiro Nishiguchi in 1994 as:

1. Assessment of a company's current spending (what is bought, where, at what prices?).
2. Assessment of the supply market (who offers what?).
3. Total cost analysis (how much does it cost to provide those goods or services?).
4. Identification of suitable suppliers.
5. Development of a sourcing strategy (where to purchase, considering demand and supply situations, while minimizing risk and costs).
6. Negotiation with suppliers (products, service levels, prices, geographical coverage, Payment Terms, etc.).
7. Implementation of new supply structure.
8. Track results and restart assessment.

Sarangapani notes that "sourcing", without its "strategic" function, was traditionally linked with the fourth step, identification of suitable suppliers, and especially the identification of new or potential suppliers.

Payne and Dorn (2012) describe a strategic sourcing process with the following steps:

1. Data collection and spend analysis
2. Market Research
3. The RFx process (also known as go to market)
4. Negotiation
5. Contracting
6. Implementation and continuous improvement

While the modernized process combines the market assessment and cost analyses steps of the older model into a single "market research" step, and the supplier identification and sourcing strategy development steps into a single "go-to-market" step, in Payne and Dorn's summary "negotiation" has been divided into two steps, "negotiation" and "contracting". This change is due to the heightened importance of market intelligence in modern strategic sourcing plans, and its ability to deliver value by improving both pricing and contract terms when leveraged against the identified suppliers.

Although both descriptions of the sourcing process are accurate to some extent, there is no standard set of steps and procedures. As strategic sourcing is put in place and practiced over time, many large, sophisticated organizations will modify the process to better meet their individual corporate needs. Since the whole process is customizable, it will tend to differ from one organization to the other. Sourcing has also used modern tools to analyze the possible outcomes. This automation makes tracking easy and the risk of errors greatly reduced.

Outsourcing a business practice to another company may also be incorporated into a sourcing strategy for services. This strategy may involve the transfer of staff and assets to the outsource company. Due to the strategic and complex nature of outsourcing, many organizations such as Procter & Gamble, Microsoft and McDonald's have created what is referred to as Vested Outsourcing agreements to help build highly collaborative win-win business relationships. Researchers at the University of Tennessee provide guidance on how to create Vested Outsourcing agreements in their book Vested Outsourcing: Five Rules that will Transform Outsourcing.

== Sourcing plan ==
The sourcing plan is the result of all planning efforts on strategic sourcing. Into this planning, all sourcing events are organized and detailed with tactical and operational information such as the sourcing team responsible for each event, when the sourcing event is supposed to begin and end based on each RFX step (RFI, RFP, RFQ), the requirements, specifications of all services or materials, and negotiations/cost goals. The objective of the sourcing plan is to manage the timing and quality of all sourcing events in the strategic sourcing program. Many procurement professionals continue to conduct sourcing and RFX activities manually using spreadsheets; however, this creates risk for error and gaps in the sourcing process.

== Sourcing optimization ==
Operations research is a discipline of applying advanced techniques to help make better decisions. Optimization, in turn, utilizes mathematical algorithms to rapidly solve a business problem by evaluating all possible outcomes (or many outcomes) and selecting those ones that yield the best solution.

When applied to sourcing and supply chain operations, optimization helps the sourcing professional simultaneously evaluate thousands of different procurement inputs. This evaluation can take into consideration the global market, specific current supply chain conditions, and individual supplier conditions, and offers alternatives to address the buyer's sourcing goals. Furthermore, it allows internal stakeholders in the buying organization to impose constraints on the award or specify preferences to favor certain non-cost objectives such as limited switching, reduced supplier numbers or higher quality outcomes.

== Cooperative sourcing ==
Cooperative sourcing is a collaboration or negotiation of different companies, which have similar business processes. To save costs, the competitor with the best production function can insource the business process of the other competitors. This is especially common in IT-oriented industries due to low to no variable costs, e.g. banking. Since all of the negotiating parties can be outsourcers or insourcers the main challenge in this collaboration is to find a stable coalition and the company with the best production function. This is difficult since the real production costs are hard to estimate and negotiators might be tempted to portray their real costs as much higher than they actually are in order to demand higher fees for insourcing. High switching costs, costs for searching potential cooperative sourcers, and negotiating often result in inefficient solutions.

== Sourcing business models ==
Sourcing Business Models are a systems-based approach to structuring supplier relationships. A sourcing business model is a type of business model that is applied to business relationships where more than one party needs to work with another party to be successful. There are seven sourcing business models that range from the transactional to investment-based.

The seven models are:

1. Basic Provider
2. Approved Provider
3. Preferred Provider
4. Performance-Based/Managed Services Model
5. Vested outsourcing Business Model
6. Shared Services Model and
7. Equity Partnership Model.

Sourcing business models are targeted for procurement professionals who seek a modern approach to achieve the best fit between buyers and suppliers.

== In popular culture ==
Strategic sourcing from a professional standpoint is lampooned in the American syndicated comic strip Sally Forth, in which the titular character's husband Ted Forth is employed within this field for the duration of the series's run. Sally Forth is currently written by the writer-illustrator team of Craig MacIntosh and Francesco Marciuliano and frequently lampoons many aspects of business and procurement culture and new trends in purchasing innovation.

== See also ==
- Reverse auction – Auction with one buyer and many potential sellers
- Request for proposal – Document that solicits a proposal
- Procurement – Acquisition of goods and services
- Rate contract
- Global sourcing – Sourcing from the global market for goods and services across geopolitical boundaries
- Tendering – Business process
