= Product (business) =

Anything that can be offered to a market

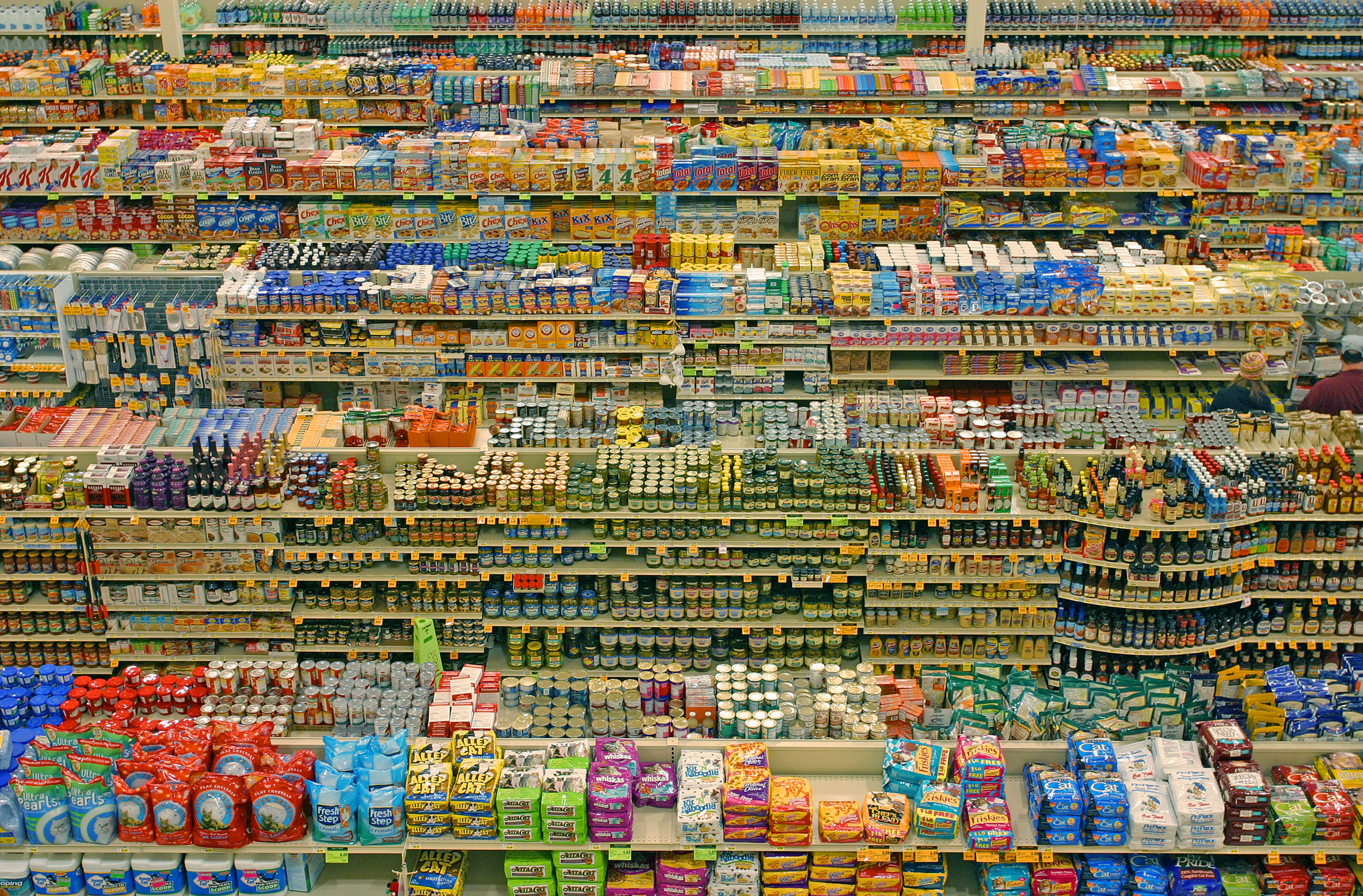
Products on shelves at a Fred Meyer hypermarket superstore

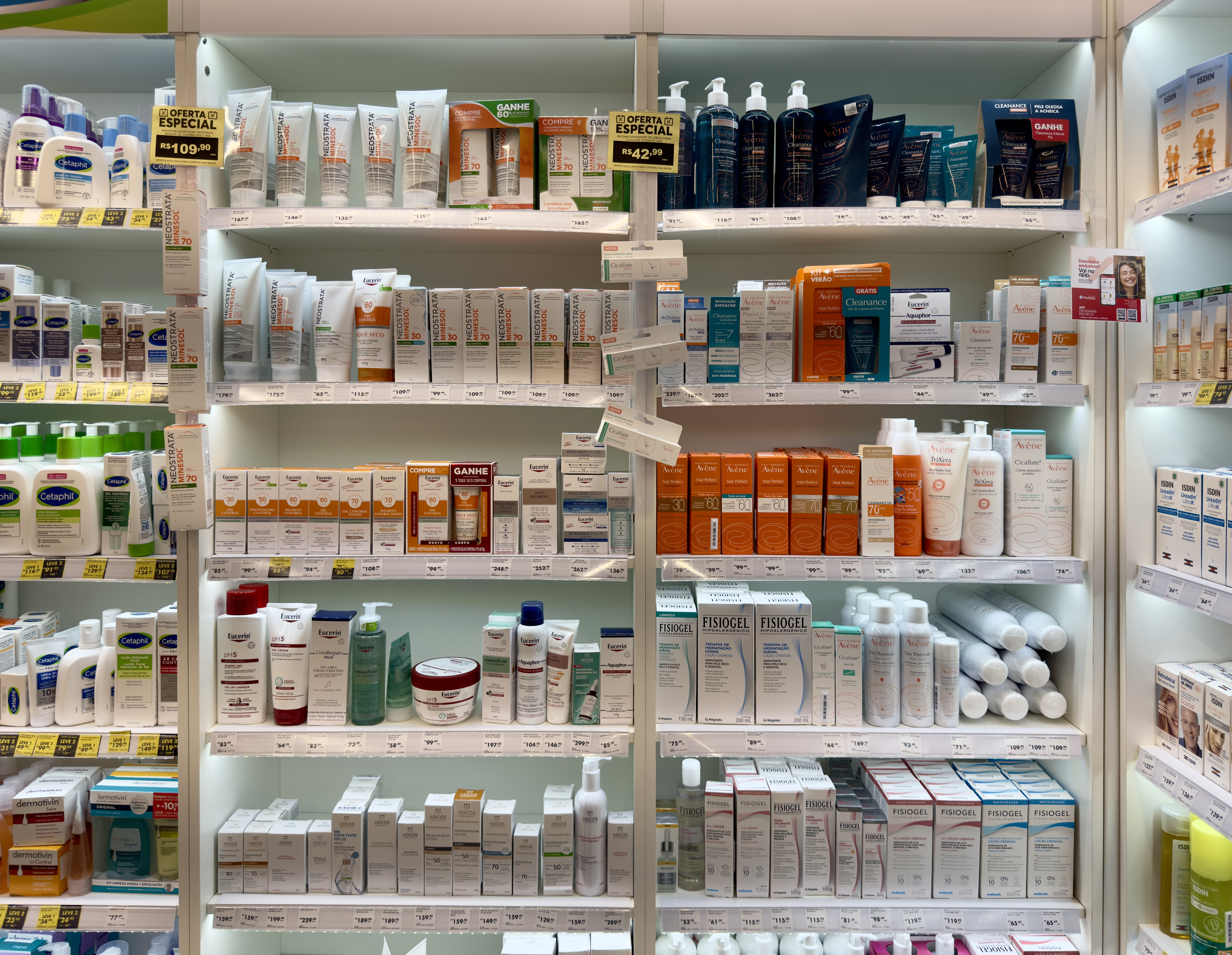
Skin care cosmetics for sale as products at a pharmacy in Brazil

In marketing and economics, a product is any object, service, or system offered to a market to satisfy a customer’s need or want. Products may be tangible, such as physical goods that can be touched and owned, or intangible, such as services, digital currency products offerings, or rights that provide value without physical form. Products are created through processes of design, production, and distribution, and they play a central role in commercial exchange, consumer behavior, and organizational strategy.

Beyond marketing, the term product is also used in fields such as manufacturing, where it refers to finished goods derived from raw materials, and project management, where it denotes deliverables produced to achieve defined objectives. Because products directly affect consumer safety, economic activity, and environmental sustainability, they are often subject to regulation, classification systems, and information-disclosure requirements across different jurisdictions.

== Product classification ==
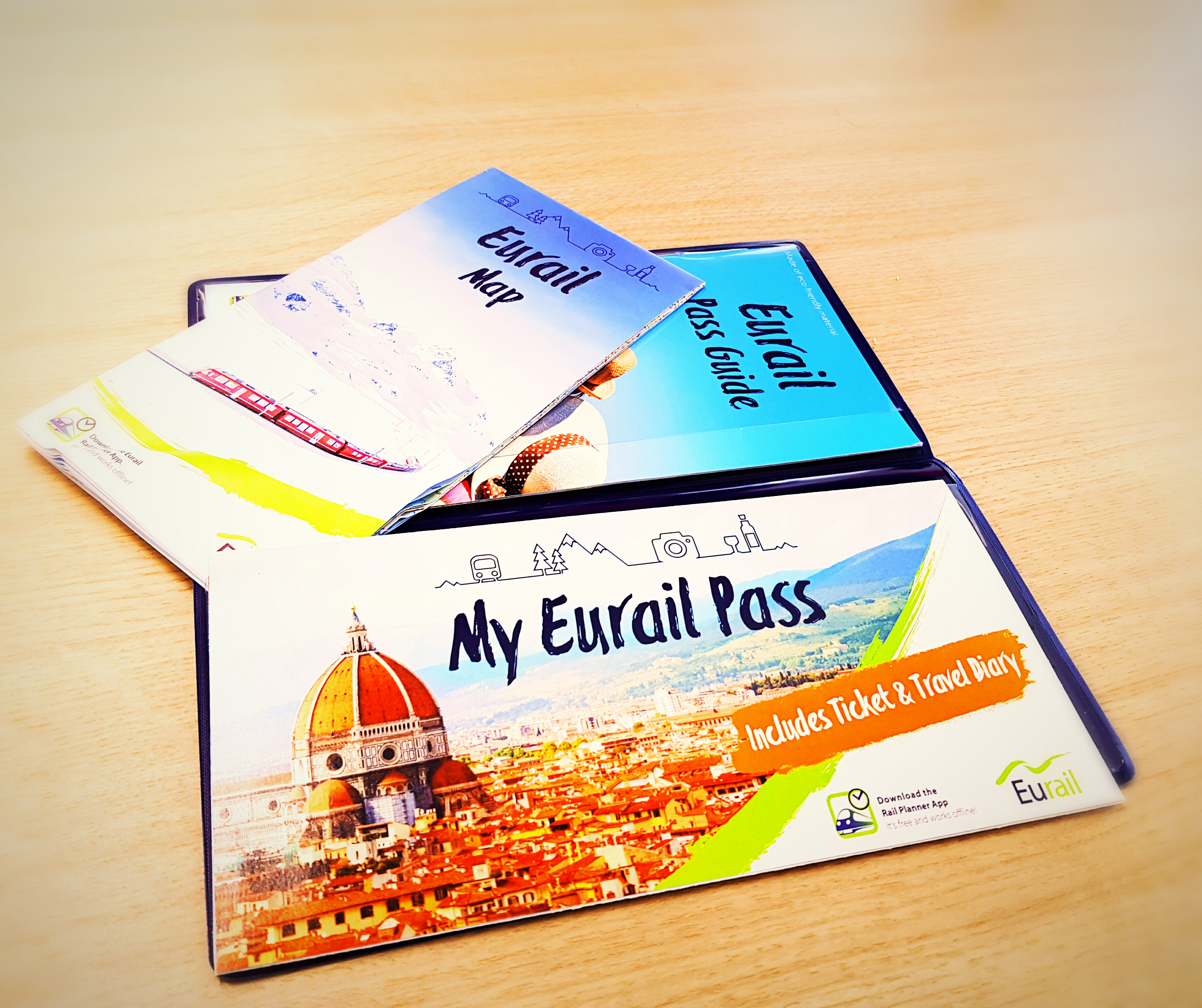
Eurail, a type of rail pass for multiple journeys by train, an intangible product

A product can be classified as tangible or intangible. A tangible product is an actual physical object that can be perceived by touch, such as a building, vehicle, gadget, or clothing. An intangible product is a product that can only be perceived indirectly, such as an insurance policy. These services can be broadly classified under intangible products, which can be durable or nondurable.

=== By use ===
In its online product catalog, retailer Sears, Roebuck and Company divides its products into "departments", then presents products to potential shoppers according to (1) function or (2) brand. Each product has a Sears item number and a manufacturer's model number. Sears uses the departments and product groupings with the intention of helping customers browse products by function or brand within a traditional department-store structure.

=== By association ===
A product line is "a group of products which are closely related, either because they function similarly, are sold to the same customer groups, are marketed through the same types of outlets, or fall within given price ranges". Many businesses offer a range of product lines (their "product mix") which may be unique to a single organisation or may be common across the business's industry. Within the insurance industry, product lines are indicated by the type of risk coverage, such as auto insurance, commercial insurance, and life insurance. Companies such as Pepsi and Coca-Cola are considered to have a very large and diverse product mix. Some companies use a large product mix to reach a number of market segments.

In 2002 the US Census compiled revenue figures for the finance and insurance industry by various product lines such as "accident, health and medical insurance premiums" and "income from secured consumer loans".

=== National and international product classifications ===
Various classification systems for products have been developed for economic statistical purposes. The NAFTA signatories are working on a system that classifies products called NAPCS as a companion to the North American Industry Classification System (NAICS). The European Union uses a "Classification of Products by Activity" among other product classifications. The United Nations also classifies products for international economic activity reporting.

The Aspinwall Classification System classifies and rates products based on five variables:

1. Replacement rate (How frequently is the product repurchased?)
2. Gross margin (How much profit is obtained from each product?)
3. Buyer goal adjustment (How flexible are the buyers' purchasing habits about this product?)
4. Duration of product satisfaction (How long will the product produce benefits for the user?)
5. Duration of buyer search behavior (How long will consumers shop for the product?)

The National Institute of Governmental Purchasing (NIGP) developed a commodity and services classification system for use by state and local governments, the NIGP Code. The NIGP Code is used by 33 states within the United States as well as thousands of cities, counties, and political subdivisions. The NIGP Code is a hierarchical schema consisting of a 3-digit class, 5-digit class-item, 7-digit class-item-group, and an 11-digit class-item-group-detail. Applications of the NIGP Code include vendor registration, inventory item identification, contract item management, spend analysis, and strategic sourcing.

== Product model ==
A manufacturer usually provides an identifier for each particular design of product they make, known as a model, model variant, or model number (often abbreviated as MN, M/N or model no., and sometimes as M- or Mk). For example, Dyson Ltd, a manufacturer of appliances (mainly vacuum cleaners), requires customers to identify their model in the support section of the website. Brand and model can be used together to identify products in the market. The model number is not necessarily the same as the manufacturer part number (MPN).

Because of the huge amount of similar products in the automotive industry, there is a special kind of defining a car with options (marks, attributes) that represent the characteristics of the vehicle. A model of a car is defined by some basic options like body, engine, gearbox, and axles. The variants of a model (often called the trim levels) are built with some additional options like color, seats, wheels, mirrors, other trims, entertainment, and assistant systems, etc. Options that exclude each other (pairwise) build an option family. That means that you can choose only one option for each family, and you have to choose exactly one option.

In addition, a specific unit of a product is often (and in some contexts must be) identified by a serial number, which is necessary to distinguish products with the same product definition. In the case of automotive products, it is called the vehicle identification number (VIN), an internationally standardised format.

== Product information ==
Product information, beyond currency price information, can include:

- Product description – typically on a label on or packaging of the product or in an online shopping website for it
- Certificates – including related to sustainability and for unobservable quality attributes
- Various types of ratings, comparisons, third-party information, and customer reviews – including user reviews
- Labels – such as energy rating labels
- Information about ingredients
- Visual content
- Place/region and company of origin
- Estimated expiration date
- Safety information
- Nutrition information, mainly contained macronutrients

Many of these types of product information are regulated to some degree, such as to some degree prohibiting false or misleading product information or requiring sellers or manufacturers to specify various information, such as ingredients of food, pharmaceutical, and hygiene products. There is also standardization. Marketing to entice the shopper is often prioritized over accurate, high-quality, or extensive and relevant information.

Product information is often a key element in the buyer decision process. Relevant factors include trust in the accuracy of the information and social normative pressure. Easily accessible and up-to-date medicinal product information can contribute to the health literacy. Online shopping is usually more informationally rich than shopping at physical stores, traveled to, and usually has higher comparability and customizability.

Production information-related developments can be useful for enabling, facilitating, or shifting towards sustainable consumption and supporting more sustainable productss. Environmental life-cycle assessment (LCA) has been widely used to assess environmental impacts across the life cycle of products. There are LCA datasets that assess all products in some supermarkets in a standardized way. Consumers may seek reliable information to evaluate relevant characteristics of products such as durability and reliability. Development of 'transparency by design' scenarios have been suggested to "complement the physical product with layers of digital information", improving transparency and traceability (T&T). The app CodeCheck gives some smartphone users some capability to scan products for assessed ingredients. Many labels are considered to be flawed and few have the time to "study the true environmental impact of every purchase". Full product transparency is a concept of making the full life-cycle impacts public. An important element that is required for various product information is supply chain transparency, which relates to human rights and supply chain sustainability.

=== Produce traceability ===
Produce traceability makes it possible to track produce from its point of origin to a retail location where it is purchased by consumers.

Produce traceability is an important link in protecting public health since it allows health agencies to more quickly and accurately identify the source of contaminated fruit or vegetables believed to be the cause of an outbreak of foodborne illness, remove them from the marketplace, and communicate to the supply chain.

=== Product passports ===
In the EU, under the renewed Sustainable Product Policy Initiative, the inclusion of a Digital Product Passport has been proposed. A material passport is a document consisting of all the materials that are included in a product or construction. It consists of a set of data describing defined characteristics of materials in products, useful for recovery, recycling, re-use, and various evaluations. They may contribute to a more circular economy.

=== Product information management ===
Product information management (PIM) is the process of managing all the information required to market and sell products through distribution channels. This product data is created by an internal organization to support a multichannel marketing strategy. A central hub of product data can be used to distribute information to sales channels such as e-commerce websites, print catalogues, online marketplaces, social media platforms, large language models and electronic data feeds to trading partners. PIM reduces the abandonment rate and improves conversion rates by giving better product information.

== See also ==
- Builder's plate
- Manufacturer part number
