= Antlos =

Former peer-to-peer sailing company

- Type: Private
- Industry: Travel & Tourism
- Founded: 2014
- Founder: Michelangelo Ravagnan (CEO); Marco Signori (CPO); Nicola Peduzzi (CTO)
- Defunct: 2018
- Headquarters: Venice, Italy
- Area served: Worldwide

Antlos was an online platform that connects tourists and travelers with skippers who own and operate private marine vessels (yachts, smaller boats, etc.). It was bought in 2018 by Sailogy, a company offering similar services.

Antlos matched tourists with boat captains providing access to their vessel while also sailing the ship to an agreed upon destination or destinations (typically in and around the Mediterranean Sea and Caribbean Sea). Some skippers offered all-inclusive trips with amenities like lodging and food. The company was founded in Venice, Italy in 2014 as part of the business incubator, H-FARM Ventures and bought by Sailogy in 2018.

== History ==
Antlos was founded in 2014 by childhood friends Michelangelo Ravagnan and Marco Signori along with Nicola Peduzzi. Ravagnan is a former yacht captain and skipper and serves as the company's CEO. Signori was the product manager and CPO while Peduzzi served as the CTO. The company was born in H-CAMP, a business accelerator that forms a component of the larger H-FARM Ventures incubator. Antlos spent four months in the accelerator program, eventually "graduating" in January 2015. In addition to the investment of H-FARM Ventures, Antlos also received funding from Club Italia Investmenti 2, an individual angel investor from H-FARM, and Incos Invest.

By August 2015, the company offered around 160 unique voyages for users to purchase. In May 2015, Antlos had accrued €500,000 in investment funding and had signed 150 professional skippers under contract.

== Business model ==
Antlos has been described as the "Airbnb of the sea" or the "Airbnb of boats" for its similarities to the peer-to-peer travel and lodging service. Some skippers offered all-inclusive, multiple-day cruises while others simply provide day trips to certain destinations.
