= Moanalua High School =

Coordinates: 21.345940°N 157.900328°W

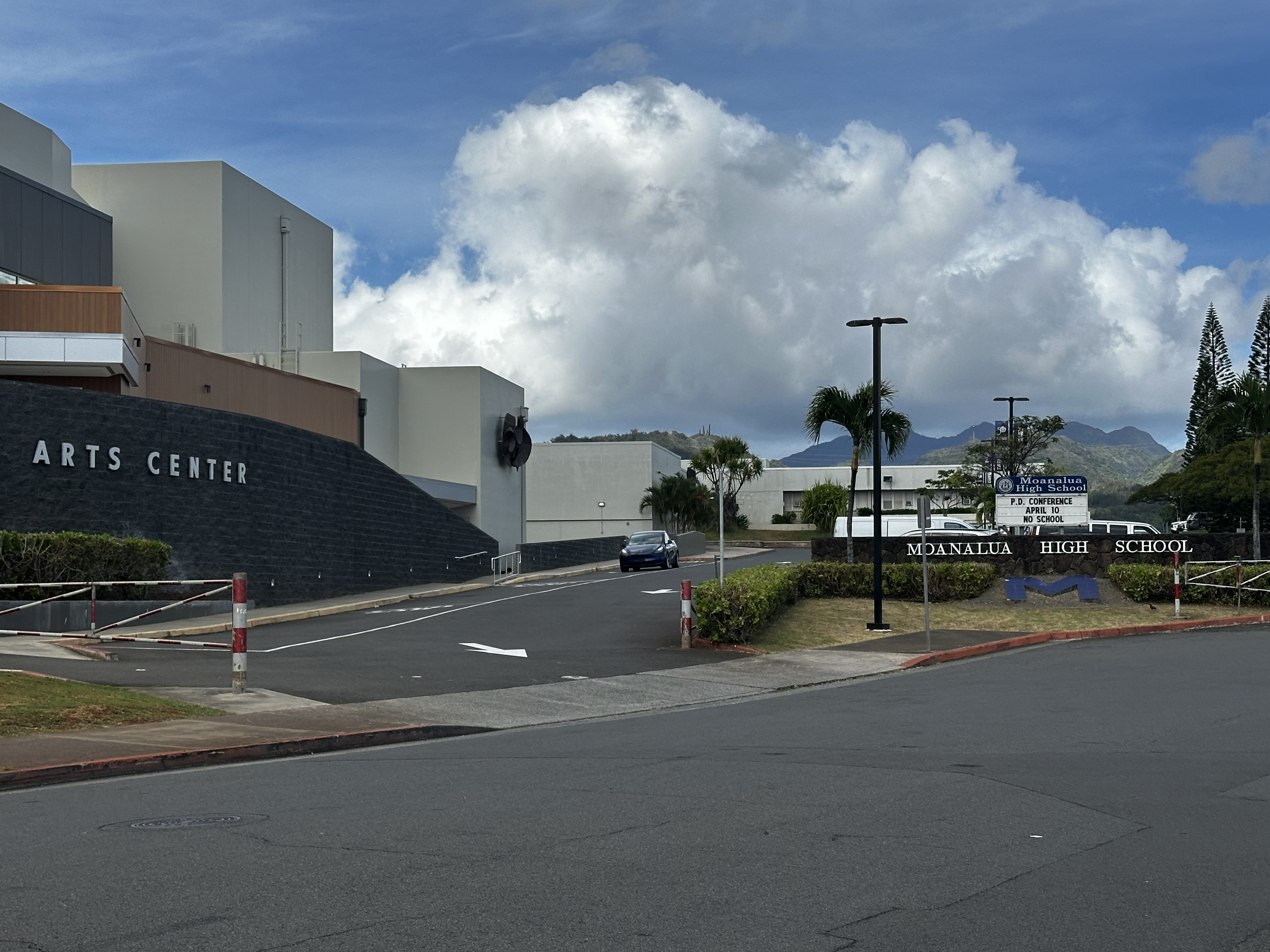

Location
- 2825 Ala Ilima Street; Honolulu, Hawaii 96818; United States

Information
- Type: Public
- Motto: "Kulia I Ka Nu'u"
- Established: 1972
- School district: Central District
- Principal: Robin Martin
- Faculty: 121.00 (FTE)
- Grades: 9-12
- Enrollment: 2,064 (2022-23)
- Student to teacher ratio: 17.06
- Campus type: Suburban
- Colors: Royal Blue and Silver
- Athletics: Oahu Interscholastic Association
- Mascot: Nā Menehune
- Rival: Admiral Arthur W. Radford High School
- Accreditation: Western Association of Schools and Colleges
- Newspaper: Nā Hōkū O Moanalua
- Yearbook: Ke Ali'i
- Military: United States Air Force JROTC
- Website: Official website

Moanalua High School (also known as MoHS) is a public, co-educational college preparatory high school of the Hawaiʻi State Department of Education, located in Honolulu CDP, City & County of Honolulu, Hawaiʻi.

Serving grades nine through twelve and established in 1972, Moanalua High School is located in suburban Salt Lake near Moanalua. Its first class graduated in 1975. The school is situated on an extinct volcano hillside overlooking downtown Honolulu at 2825 Ala ʻIlima Street. The campus boasts the copper sculpture Moanalua by Bumpei Akaji and the ceramic sculpture Silent Sounds by Shigeharu Yamada. As of 2016, its attendance boundary includes Fort Shafter, the housing at Tripler Army Medical Center, and portions of the Aliamanu Military Reservation.

Moanalua High School is accredited by the Western Association of Schools and Colleges and has achieved the maximum accreditation term of six years, 2012-2018 and once again in 2019-2024.

Robin Martin heads the school as principal.

== Origins ==
Before the school was built, the land was an ahupuaʻa. An ahupuaʻa in ancient Hawaiʻi was a parcel of land that stretched from the mountain to the sea. The ahupuaʻa of Moanalua was the property of wealthy landowner Samuel M. Damon.

Previous to Damon's ownership of the Salt Lake ahupuaʻa, the volcanic hillside on which Moanalua High School sits was used by native Hawaiians in the Hawaiian religion. As one of the highest points overlooking what would later become the city of Honolulu, the volcanic hillside was revered as a place where the faithful could be closer to the ancestral spirits and gods. It also served as a sacred altar as late as the reign of King Kamehameha V. The volcanic hillside's religious value was neglected during the urban development after statehood in 1959.

Moanalua High School adopted the menehune as their mascot. In Hawaiian mythology, the Menehune are said to be a people, sometimes described as dwarfs in size, who live in the deep forests and hidden valleys of the Hawaiian Islands, far from the eyes of normal humans. The menehune are believed to have a special relationship with the gods and credited with building dams, temples and other structures throughout the Hawaiian Islands.

== Administration ==
=== Principal ===
- R. Martin

== Admissions ==
To attend the school, students must be within the attendance zone or apply for a geographic exception. In May 2012, the school admitted about 500-600 students from outside of the attendance zone. A lottery is used to determine which out of boundary students are admitted. In an article for the Honolulu Advertiser, staff writer James Gosner wrote that the admissions process was "nail bitting".

== Academics ==
The school's academics have been praised by different news outlets. In May 2012, Tiffany Hill of Honolulu Magazine wrote that the school had "high-caliber programs" and a strong curriculum. In addition, she also stated that some programs are "nationally recognized". In 2004, James Gonser of the Honolulu Advertiser wrote that the school had "A reputation for success". He also wrote that "[the school's] many success stories" originated from the "personal attention" and "choices" provided by the school's employees to the students.

Per the Hawaii Department of Education, the school utlilizes Common Core Standards. As of 2024, the school is ranked #1,618 nationally and #3 in Hawaii High Schools, Honolulu, HI Metro High Schools, and Hawaii Department of Education High Schools on U.S. News & World Report. On GreatSchools.org, the school has a ranking of 8/10.

Per the Board of Education, the school requires four credits in English, four credits in social studies, three credits in mathematics, three credits in science, two credits in either world language, fine arts, or Career Technical Education, one credit in physical education, half a credit in health, and half a credit for the Personal Transition Plan (PTP), for a total of 24 credits.

For dual-credit, the school offers Advanced Placement and Running Start classes. Between 2024 and 2026, the school will offer a total of 17 AP classes. These include courses in English, mathematics, science, social studies, and regular electives. These are AP Literature, AP Language and Composition, AP Calculus AB or AC, AP Biology, AP Chemistry, AP Physics, AP Environmental Science, AP Psychology, AP Macro Economy, AP Micro Economy, AP Chinese, AP Computer Science, AP Japanese, AP Seminar, AP Spanish, AP Studio Art 2D or 3D, and AP Research. As of the 2021-2022 school year, the school has an AP participation rate of 42%, with 29% passing the exam. Running Start is offered at Leeward Community College, which is a part of the University of Hawaiʻi system.

The Career and Academic Planning (CAP) program oversees career education classes, which are considered an advisory period. Beginning in 1997, each CAP class runs for 35 minutes, with each student taking at least one each week.

== Enrollment and demographics ==
In May 2012 the school had about 2,010 pupils. The students tend to have a higher socioeconomic profile.

The following table represents the number of enrolled students from the years 2003 to 2014.

2003	2004	2005	2006	2007	2008	2009	2010	2011	2012	2013	2014
2,022	2,005	2,016	2,016	1,958	2,017	2,102	2,086	2,010	2,200	2,100	1,999

As of the 2023-2024 school year, the school has an enrollment of 1,933 students. Of this, 32% of the students were considered Asian, 25% were considered Filipino, 9% were considered Native Hawaiian, 8% were considered Pacific Islander, 7% were considered Black, and 2% were considered Hispanic. 24% of the population were considered economically disadvantaged, 7% were considered special education, and 4% were considered English learners.

== Athletics ==
In 2004, the school offered 50 sports. That year, about 800 students participated in them.

In the year of Moanalua High School's founding, its athletics department joined the Hawaii High School Athletics Association. The school competes in the Oahu Interscholastic Association (OIA), an athletic conference of public schools on the island of Oʻahu. As of the 2024-2025 school year, Moanalua competes in a variety of sports including air riflery, bowling, cheerleading, cross country, football, soft tennis, softball, volleyball, basketball, paddling, soccer, swimming, tennis, wrestling, baseball, flag football, golf, judo, track & field, and water polo.

=== State championships ===
- Basketball, Boys' - 1996, 1997
- Bowling, Boys' - 1985, 1990, 2004
- Golf, Girls' - 2006
- Golf, Boys' - 2012, 2016, 2018
- Competitive Cheerleading - 2003, 2004, 2005, 2015, 2016, 2018
- Track, Girls' - 1994
- Wrestling, Boys' - 2022
- Wrestling, Girls' - 1999, 2000, 2001, 2022
- Judo, Boys' - 2010, 2011, 2012, 2018, 2019, 2022
- Judo, Girls' - 2018, 2019, 2022
- Air Riflery, Boys' - 2016, 2017, 2019

== Music program ==
The Moanalua High School music program is operated by the school's music department. The program offers a variety of ensembles, including a Marching Band, Symphonic Wind Ensemble, Symphony Orchestra, Symphonic Band, Concert Orchestra, Concert Choir, Chorus, Jazz Ensemble, and Concert Band. In 2007, the Concert Strings ensemble was introduced, which expanded the department's offerings and provided students with the opportunity to explore string instruments. The school also offers programs in piano and ukulele. These groups, however, do not perform. The program is supported by the Moanalua High School Boosters Association. In May 2012, in an article for the Honolulu Magazine, Tiffany Hill wrote that the orchestra was well reputed.

=== Marching band ===
The Moanalua High School Menehune Marching Band is a marching band program with an established record as being one of the top and largest marching bands in Hawaii. The band is led by directors Elden Seta, Rhona Barbosa, Cavin Takesue and Todd Oshima.

The x member program holds its own marching festival each year, which is known as the Menehune Classic. It also competes in other annual competitions such as the Kamehameha Tournament of Bands, Mililani Trojan Band Fest, the OIA Festival, and the Rainbow Invitational. It usually marches in at least one parade each year, such as the Aloha Week parade, and is frequently invited to march in out-of-state parades such as the Tournament of Roses Parade.

The marching band traveled to Osaka, Japan, to march in the Osaka Midosuji Parade. In 2009, the band traveled to Arizona to participate in the Fiesta Bowl Parade.

=== Symphony orchestra ===
The Moanalua High School Symphony Orchestra is an orchestra consisting of hand picked students from grades 9 to 12. The symphony orchestra was the first student orchestra to be invited to perform at New York's Carnegie Hall in 1998. The symphony orchestra were invited to perform again on March 20, 2005 at the Isaac Stern Auditorium, in which they received a standing ovation where audience members reportedly yelled, "Good job, Hawaiʻi!"

== Clubs & Activities ==
=== HOSA ===
As of 2026, Moanalua High School is one of 49 local chapter affiliations of Hawai'i HOSA (Health Occupations Students of America), and the Moanalua chapter is directed by a school teacher L. Hashizume. In 2025, the school won multiple first, second, and third places in Biotechnology, CERT skills, CPR/First Aid, Extemporaneous Writing - Health Policy, Health Education, Medical Assisting, Mental Health promotion, Public Service Announcement, Researched Persuasive Writing and Speaking, Sports Medicine, and Veterinary Science sections at the state competition.

=== DECA ===
As of 2026, Moanalua High School is one of 21 local chapters of Distributed Education Clubs of America (DECA) in Hawaii, and the Moanalua chapter is directed by a school teacher J. Kramer. The school won multiple first, second, and third places in Business Services Marketing, Entrepreneurship, Marketing Communications, Quick Serve Restaurant Management, Retail Merchandising, Principles of Marketing, Personal Financial Literacy, Hospitality Team Decision Making, and Travel and Tourism Team Decision Making sections in the 2025 Hawai'i DECA State Conference.

=== LEO club ===
Founded in 1977, the school's Leo Club is under the authority of the Honolulu Moanalua Lions Club. The club is directed by J. Deliz, a teacher at Moanalua High School. The club serves communities by volunteering in different events ranging from regional to state, including the Turkey Trot Health Fair, Moanalua Elementary Fun Fair, local Halloween event, and the Okinawan festival in Honolulu. In 2019, the school won first place for having the biggest club in the state.

=== Other(s) ===
The school has Family Career Community Leaders of America, or FCCLA, one of five Career and Technical Student Organizations, along with HOSA and DECA. Other than pre-professional clubs, the school provides varied academic clubs, including coding, math, and science, and provides 6 different official cultural/language clubs.

== Facilities ==
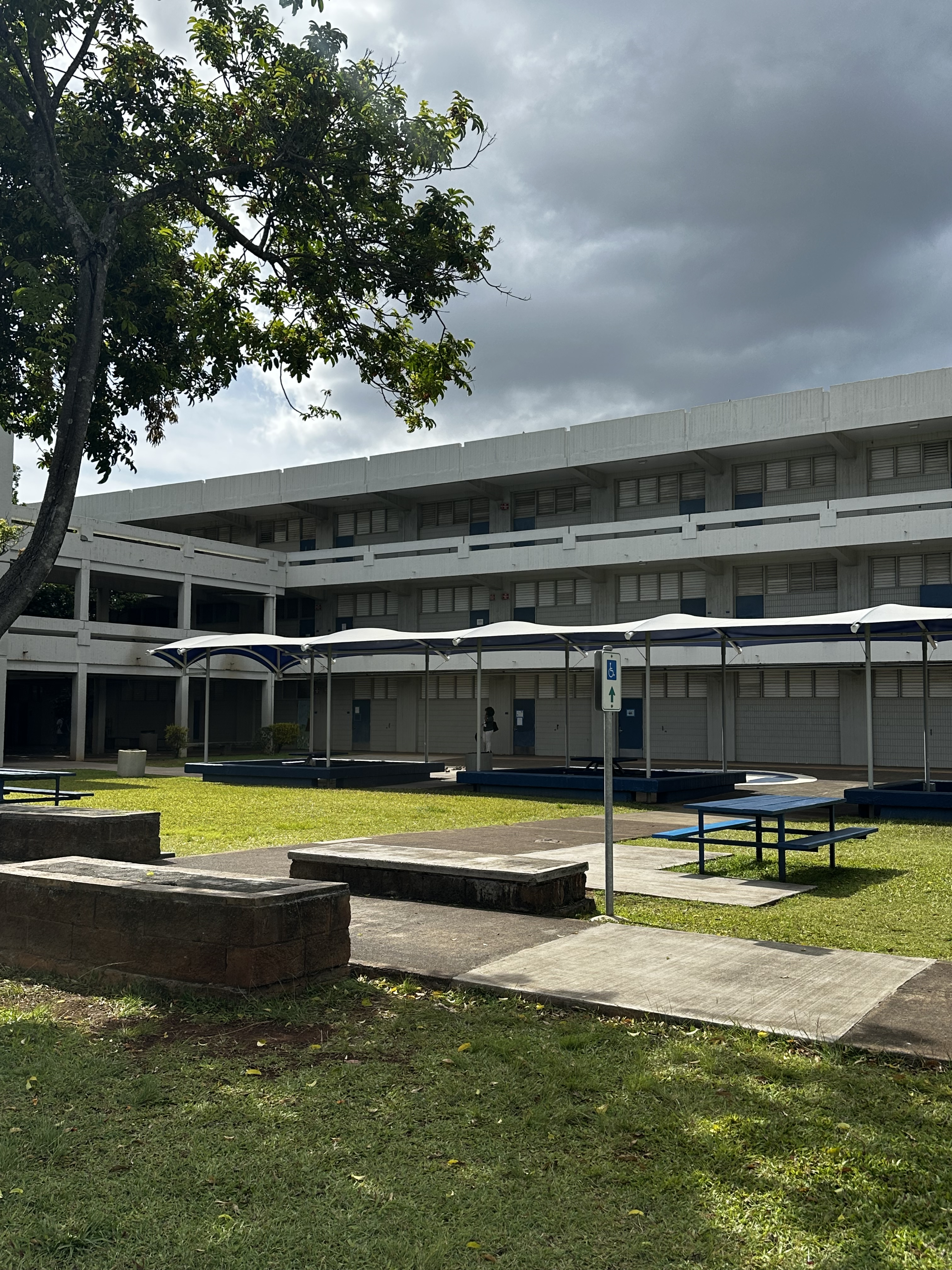
Image of M Building at Moanalua High School

Starting from the three-floor M building as the first building in Moanalua High School, F, G, H, I, and the portal(P) buildings are located on the campus for teachers instructing various subjects, including Math, English language arts, history, science, and different language classes.

=== Cafeteria ===
Alongside the M building, the school cafeteria was one of the first buildings constructed. Most students eat lunch on the first floor, and seniors can access the cafeteria through bridges connected from the M building on the second floor. The abstract bronze structure named "Moanalua", designed by artist Bumpei Akaji, was originally structured on the exterior wall of the cafeteria, and has now moved to the Performing Arts Center (PAC).

=== Gymnasium ===
The school gymnasium has 15 bleachers in 10 sections, seating over 2,000 people. Events, including school assemblies and indoor sports games, are held here.

=== Baseball & Softball field ===
Before it was first drafted in March, 2021, games were played on dirt and grass. With over $2 million invested, the current baseball field is matted with turf, featuring a newly installed batting cage, softball dugout, visitor dugout, and softball bullpen.

=== Performing arts center ===
In 2013, the school completed and dedicated the first phase of a new performing arts facility, which resulted in the construction of a new band room. In 2018, phase two was completed, which added an auditorium with a music library, rehearsal and instruction spaces, storage rooms, and other facilities for the school's music and drama departments.

In 2019, Moanalua High School began construction of the Performing Arts Center, which opened on March 12, 2021. The facility includes a 694-seat auditorium with advanced audio-visual systems and LED lighting. It also provides rehearsal and instructional spaces for music and drama programs, including a dance and choral room, storage areas, and a music library. The property was a part of American School & University's 2021 Architectural Portfolio.

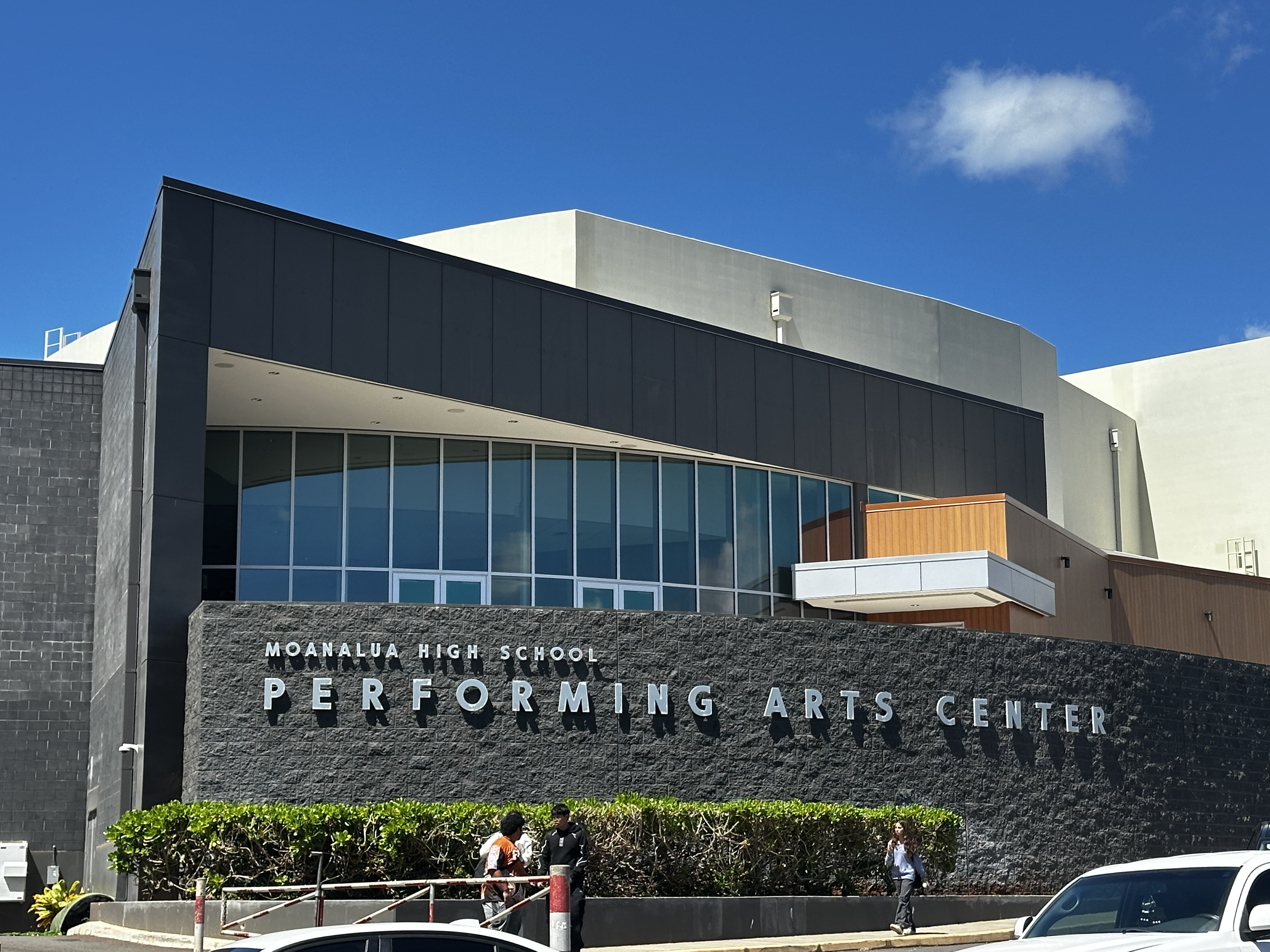
Image of Performing arts center at Moanalua High School

The center was built to accommodate the increasing number of students in the school's music and performing arts programs. Prior to its construction, concerts were often sold out due to limited seating capacity. The center had been planned for over 20 years. The facility serves both Moanalua High School students and the wider community, providing a venue for various cultural and educational events. The property was built after the first and second phases of a performing arts facility were built.

The project was initiated in 2019, with groundbreaking ceremonies held in April of that year.

== School Programs ==
In addition to college-preparatory courses, such as Advanced Placement (AP) courses, the school offers Career-Technical Education (CTE) for students to explore different career paths while in high school. English Language Learner (ELL) supports are available for students whose first language is not English, and integrated co-teaching systems with 8 teachers are present for special education students.

Special Ed teachers teach about taxes, credit, and debit cards for students who have intellectual/learning disabilities to develop money management skills and to encourage independent living.

The school offers the Hawaii Creative Media Program, preparing students for employment in the growing media industry. Students get to learn soft skills and develop creativity through various media classes, multiple state competitions, workshops, and booths held by big-time companies, including Ōlelo Community Media, Pro Camera Hawaii, and Sony.

== JROTC ==
The school has an Air Force JROTC; in 2004 it was the largest such program in Hawaii.

== Notable alumni ==
- Angela Perez Baraquio (1994), Miss America 2001
- Linda Ichiyama, member of the Hawaii House of Representatives
- Aaron Ling Johanson, member of the Hawaii House of Representatives
- Dae Sung Lee (1977), taekwondo master
- Stephany Lee, wrestler
- Kymberly Pine, member of the Hawaii House of Representatives
- Kenji Treschuk, professional soccer player
