= Steve Thel =

American academic and lawyer (1954–2026)

- Born: Steven Scott Thel; December 28, 1954; Tacoma, Washington, U.S.
- Died: March 14, 2026 (aged 71); Princeton Junction, New Jersey, U.S.
- Education: University of North Texas; Harvard Law School
- Occupations: Academic; lawyer
- Spouse: Patricia Mann (m. 1981)

Steven Scott Thel (December 28, 1954 – March 14, 2026) was an American academic and lawyer.

== Early life and career ==
Thel was born in Tacoma, Washington, on December 28, 1954, the son of Albert John Thel, a United States Army physician, and Ruth Muriel McAvoy. He attended Radford High School, graduating in 1972. After graduating, he attended the University of North Texas, earning his BA degree in economics in 1976. He also attended Harvard Law School, earning his JD degree in 1979. After earning his degrees, he worked as a law clerk for Albert John Henderson, a district judge of the United States Court of Appeals for the Fifth Circuit.

Thel served as the I. Maurice Wormser Professor of Law at Fordham University School of Law from 1992 to 2025. During his years as a professor, from 1992 to 1993, he served as a visiting professor at Cornell Law School.

== Personal life and death ==
In 1981, Thel married Patricia Mann. Their marriage lasted until Thel's death in 2026.

Thel died at his home in Princeton Junction, New Jersey, on March 14, 2026, at the age of 71.
