= ISO 25500 =

Draft international standard on supply chains

ISO 25500: Supply chain interoperability and integration — Part 1: Overview and principles of the Industrial Internet is a Draft International Standard under development by the International Organization for Standardization (ISO) Technical Committee ISO/TC 184/SC 5.

It provides a high-level overview and foundational principles for an international framework to support interoperable supply chain information systems and digital integration. The description in this article is based on publicly available abstracts, metadata, and secondary sources, as the full copyrighted text of the standard itself is not freely accessible.

== Status ==
As of 2026, ISO 25500-1 is registered at the Draft International Standard (DIS) stage and is undergoing enquiry with ISO member bodies.

== Scope and purpose ==
ISO 25500-1 outlines the overall scope of the ISO 25500 series of standards for supply chain interoperability and integration, and establishes the core principles that underpin the industrial internet concept as it relates to interoperable supply chains. The document’s scope includes:

- Stating the scope of the ISO 25500 series as a whole.
- Establishing the principles of supply chain interoperability and integration.
- Describing the path to achieving interoperability and integration among supply chain information systems.
- Describing the structure of the ISO 25500 series.
- Providing a summary of the content of each part of the series.
- Establishing the relationship of the ISO 25500 series to other international standards.

== Context ==
In supply chain management, interoperability refers to the ability of diverse software systems and organizations to exchange and meaningfully use information. Standardized data formats and protocols help enable seamless digital communication across trading partners and systems. ISO 25500 is developed to support such interoperability at scale by providing standardized approaches for structured data exchange and verification among authorized parties.

== Series structure ==
ISO 25500-1 is part of a broader ISO 25500 series under development, which covers multiple related parts addressing specific aspects of interoperable supply chain data and processes. Examples include:

- ISO 25500-100: Verification of supply chain data.
- ISO 25500-240: Strategic sourcing concepts, principles, and data requirements.

Each part defines specific requirements, structures, or protocols that, when taken together, form a framework for achieving interoperable, integrated digital supply chains.

== Usage ==
ISO 25500-1 describes the intended use of the ISO 25500 series within digital supply chain information systems. Working in conjunction with other data standards, such as ISO 8000 for data quality, the ISO 25500 series is intended to support interoperable exchange of verified supply chain data between authorized parties. The standard outlines how common principles for data verification and validation can be applied to supply chain transactions to support consistent interpretation of information across organizations. These principles are intended to facilitate digital integration among trading partners and to support activities such as due diligence, regulatory reporting, and monitoring of compliance requirements. ISO 25500-1 does not define specific operational processes or mandate business outcomes, but instead provides a conceptual framework intended to support transparency and interoperability in digitally enabled supply chains.

== See also ==
- Data portability
- Industrial Internet
- ISO 8000 – international standard on data quality and master data
- Supply chain management
