= Brian Shul =

American pilot (1948–2023)

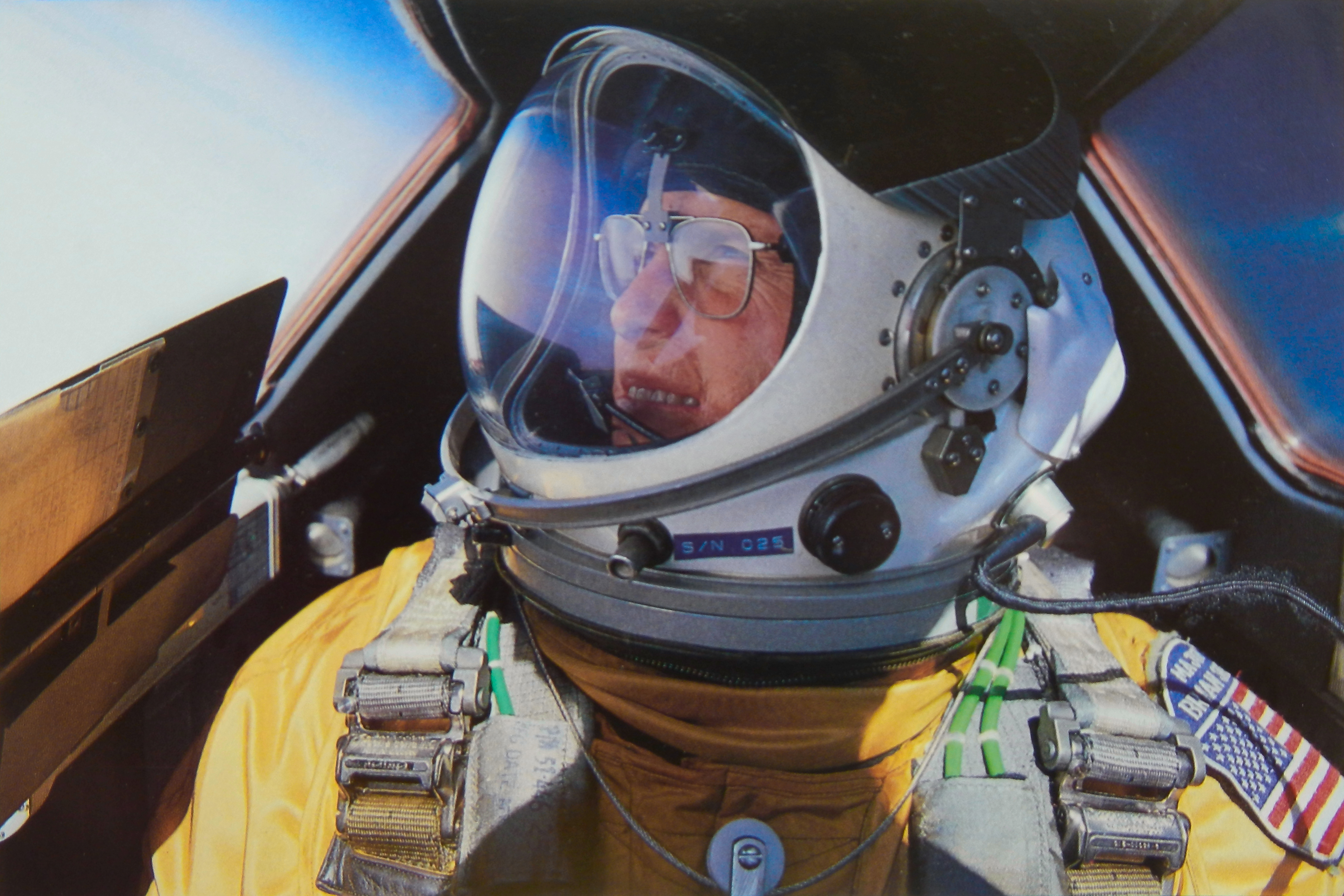
- Shul in the cockpit of the SR-71 Blackbird
- Born: February 8, 1948; Quantico, Virginia, U.S.
- Died: May 20, 2023 (aged 75); Reno, Nevada, U.S.
- Military career
- Allegiance: United States of America
- Branch: United States Air Force
- Service years: 1970–1990
- Rank: Major
- Conflicts: Vietnam War
- Awards: Purple Heart
- Other work: Aerial photographer

Brian Shul (8 February 1948 – 20 May 2023) was an American pilot and photographer. A Vietnam War-era attack pilot and a major in the United States Air Force (USAF), he flew 212 combat missions and was shot down near the end of the war. He was so badly burned that he was given next to no chance to live. Surviving, he returned to full flight status, flying the SR-71 Blackbird. Major Shul completed a 20-year career in the Air Force. He wrote four books on aviation and ran a photo studio in Marysville, California, until his death in Reno, Nevada.

== Biography ==
Brian Shul was born in Quantico, Virginia on February 8, 1948. He graduated from Radford High School in Honolulu, Hawaii, in 1966 and from East Carolina University in 1970 with a degree in history. That same year he joined the USAF and attended pilot training at Reese Air Force Base in Texas.

=== Vietnam War ===
Shul served as a Foreign Air Advisor in the Vietnam War, flying 212 close air support missions in conjunction with Air America. In 1973, his T-28 Trojan aircraft was shot down near the Cambodian border. Unable to eject from the aircraft, Shul crash landed into the jungle. Surviving the initial impact of the crash, he suffered severe burns in the ensuing fireball. Two fellow American soldiers went in to the burning wreckage and pulled Brian out, surviving in hostile territory with extensive wounds for more than a day. Enemy patrols were looking for him, with soldiers walking to within a few yards distance, although he was unsure of his judgment and thought they were hallucinations.

The rescue mission did not start immediately because his precise location was unknown, there were enemy soldiers nearby, and heavy jungle cover overhead. Using a combination of resources, the general area he was in was later identified and it was confirmed that no body was present at the crash site. Shul activated his radio and confirmed his identity and general location, and an aerial search was initiated. He did not know his precise location, but he did know the approximate area where he was – so the search continued until his exact location was determined by him being able to see American aircraft. The only practical way to recover Shul was by helicopter. As it would likely be under fire from the enemy, Air Force Special Operations Command Pararescue teams conducted the rescue operation. Although the original plan was to extract Shul quietly without the enemy noticing, the operation quickly turned into an openly hostile mission. Nearby enemy patrols were driven back by the rescue teams using small arms, while larger groups of enemies or search parties were handled with heavy weapon outfitted operators or operators acting as forward air control. Once Shul was located, the team provided medical treatment to ensure that the extraction would not result in further wounds or make his existing wounds worse. Since the jungle cover was so dense in the area he was located, the rescue helicopter did not have sufficient rotor clearance to land, so Shul was loaded in while the pilot held a hover four feet above the ground. Medical treatment continued aboard the evacuation helicopter and at an American base. No American casualties occurred in the operation.

Once he arrived at the military hospital on Okinawa, doctors believed he would not survive his burns. Following two months of intensive care, he flew to the Institute of Surgical Research at Fort Sam Houston, Texas. During the following year, he underwent 15 major operations. Physicians told him he'd never fly again. Months of physical therapy followed, enabling Shul to eventually pass a flight physical and return to active flying duty.

=== Post-Vietnam ===
Two days after being released from the hospital, Shul was back flying fighter jet aircraft. He went on to fly the A-7D Corsair II, and was then selected to be a part of the first operational A-10 Thunderbolt II squadron at Myrtle Beach AFB, South Carolina, where he was on the first A-10 air show demonstration team. After a tour as an A-10 instructor pilot at Davis-Monthan AFB, Arizona, he went on to instruct at the USAF's Fighter Lead-In School as the Chief of Air-to-Ground Academics. As a final assignment in his career, Shul volunteered for and was selected to fly the SR-71. This assignment required an astronaut-type physical just to qualify, and Shul passed with no waivers. Shul's comeback story, from lying near dead in the jungle of Southeast Asia to later flying the world's fastest, highest flying jet, has been the subject of numerous magazine articles. Shul also made an Air Force safety video titled "Sierra Hotel" (with the title referring to the phonetic alphabet code for the military aviator slang expletive "Shit Hot") where he described his crash ordeal in explicit detail in order to motivate other USAF pilots to be more safety conscious and teaching them how to better survive such incidents.

After 20 years and 5000 hours in fighter jets, Shul retired from the Air Force in 1990 and went on to pursue his writing and photographic interests. In addition to running his own photo studio in northern California, he authored seven books on flying and flight photography. His first two books (Sled Driver: Flying The World's Fastest Jet and The Untouchables) are about flying the SR-71 Blackbird and give the reader a first-hand account of being in the cockpit of the world's fastest jet. Shul's third and fourth books are about America's air demonstration teams, the Navy Blue Angels, in Blue Angels: A Portrait of Gold, and the Air Force Thunderbirds, in Summer Thunder and contain aerial images from inside the formations of these teams. In 1997, Shul released his fifth book, Eagle Eyes : Action Photography from the Cutting Edge, which is a collection of his in-flight photos.

Most of his photographic work for the last few years of his life were nature shots, especially of wild birds of all species. He often posted these online, with detailed descriptions of the circumstances involved in taking the photograph.

Shul also traveled as an inspirational speaker. A number of his talks can be found online.

In his talks, Shul told the story of the SR-71 being the end of a ground speed check over radio one-upmanship with the smug pilot of an F/A-18 Hornet. He later reported that this was the most-repeated story about the SR-71 in history, according to Smithsonian Magazine.

On May 20, 2023, Shul collapsed just after giving his famous SR-71 presentation for an audience in Reno, NV. He was transported to the hospital where he was pronounced dead from cardiac arrest at the age of 75.
