= Craig MacIntosh =

American cartoonist (born 1943)

Craig MacIntosh (born December 28, 1943) is an American cartoonist. MacIntosh worked on the comic strip Sally Forth along with colleague and writer Francesco Marciuliano until his retirement in 2013. He worked as an editorial cartoonist for the Minneapolis Star Tribune from 1975 until 1992 and the Dayton Journal Herald from 1970 until 1975.

Craig MacIntosh was born in Long Beach, California. in 1943. He grew up in a Navy family and lived on both coasts as a child and considers Honolulu his hometown. He graduated from Radford High School in 1962 and went to University of Illinois, graduating in 1966 with degree in Fine Arts.

MacIntosh was drafted that fall and spent three years in the U.S. Army, with the last year in Vietnam as an infantry platoon leader. When he returned home, he began work as an editorial cartoonist with the Dayton Journal Herald in Dayton, Ohio. In 1975, he moved to Minneapolis to become the editorial cartoonist for the evening Minneapolis Star and then continued with the merged Star and Tribune (now Star Tribune). In 1979–80, he created a strip called "Gunnar" for the local PBS station. In 1986, he and cartoonist Steve Sack joined to create the children's cartoon feature Professor Doodles. In 1992, he left the paper to work full-time on the syndicated cartoon strip Sally Forth, created by Greg Howard.

He has published two books of drawings of historic buildings in Dayton and Minneapolis. He is an accomplished watercolor artist.

== Personal life ==
MacIntosh is married, with two adult children.

== Fiction writing career ==
MacIntosh has also begun writing fiction stories. He has eleven books currently published as of the time of this writing -- McFadden's War (a crime story set in the Philippines), The Last Lightning (a World War II novel),The Fortunate Orphans (another World War II story), a series of adventures of fictional former Navy Seal Tom Wolf, two Constable Jeremiah McKay adventures set in the Bahamas and Culling (Minneapolis after George Floyd)

== Biography ==
- The Fortunate Orphans (2009)
- The Last Lightning (2013)
- McFadden's War (2015)
- Wolf's Vendetta (2015)
- Wolf's Inferno (2016)
- Wolf's Baja (2017)
- Wolf's Odyssey (2019)
- Til Kingdom Key (2020)
- Wolf's Admiral (2022)
- Ezekiel Cameron’s Wicked Sea (2023)
- Culling (2025)

== See also ==
- Sally Forth
- Francesco Marciuliano
