= Wayne Hunter =

American football player (born 1981)

No. 73, 70, 78, 72
- Position: Offensive tackle

Personal information
- Born: July 2, 1981 (age 45); Honolulu, Hawaii, U.S.
- Listed height: 6 ft 5 in (1.96 m)
- Listed weight: 318 lb (144 kg)

Career information
- High school: Admiral Arthur W. Radford (Honolulu)
- College: Hawaii
- NFL draft: 2003: 3rd round, 73rd overall pick

Career history
- Seattle Seahawks (2003–2005); Jacksonville Jaguars (2006); New York Jets (2007–2011); St. Louis Rams (2012); Buffalo Bills (2015)*
- * Offseason or practice squad member only

Career NFL statistics
- Games played: 77
- Games started: 25
- Stats at Pro Football Reference

Wayne Hunter (born July 2, 1981) is an American former professional football player who was an offensive tackle in the National Football League (NFL). He was selected by the Seattle Seahawks in the third round of the 2003 NFL draft. He played college football for the Hawaii Warriors after transferring from the California Golden Bears.

Hunter also played for the Jacksonville Jaguars, New York Jets, and St. Louis Rams.

== Early life ==
Hunter attended Radford High School in Honolulu, Hawai'i. After retirement, he was inducted into the Radford Hall of Fame on 15 May 2024.

== College career ==
Hunter began his college career playing at the University of California, Berkeley. He later transferred to the University of Hawaiʻi at Mānoa.

== Professional career ==
Pre-draft measurables
Height	Weight	Arm length	Hand span	40-yard dash	10-yard split	20-yard split	20-yard shuttle	Three-cone drill	Vertical jump	Broad jump	Bench press
6 ft 6 in (1.98 m)	303 lb (137 kg)	33 in (0.84 m)	11 1/4 in (0.29 m)	5.12 s	1.77 s	2.97 s	4.57 s	7.72 s	31 in (0.79 m)	8 ft 8 in (2.64 m)	37 reps
All values from NFL Combine.

=== Seattle Seahawks ===
Hunter was selected in the third round with the 73rd overall pick in the 2003 NFL draft. He played three seasons with the Seahawks.

=== Jacksonville Jaguars ===
Hunter played one season with the Jacksonville Jaguars in 2006.

=== New York Jets ===
On March 23, 2010, Hunter signed a 1-year tender with the Jets worth about $1.2 million. Hunter came to an agreement on a four-year $15 million contract extension on July 26, 2011, with the team, replacing Damien Woody. During the 2011 season finale against the Miami Dolphins, Hunter was involved about an argument with Santonio Holmes while the team was huddling. Holmes was benched for the game after the argument and the Jets would eventually lose the game plus miss the postseason for the first time in 3 years.

On August 23, 2012, head coach Rex Ryan made the decision to bench Hunter for allowing too many sacks. Austin Howard replaced Hunter at that time.

=== St. Louis Rams ===
On August 27, 2012, the Jets traded Hunter to the St. Louis Rams for right tackle Jason Smith.

On March 6, 2013, Hunter was released.

=== Buffalo Bills ===
On July 1, 2015, Hunter signed with the Buffalo Bills. Hunter was later released on July 21, 2015.
