= Rob Todd =

American entrepreneur

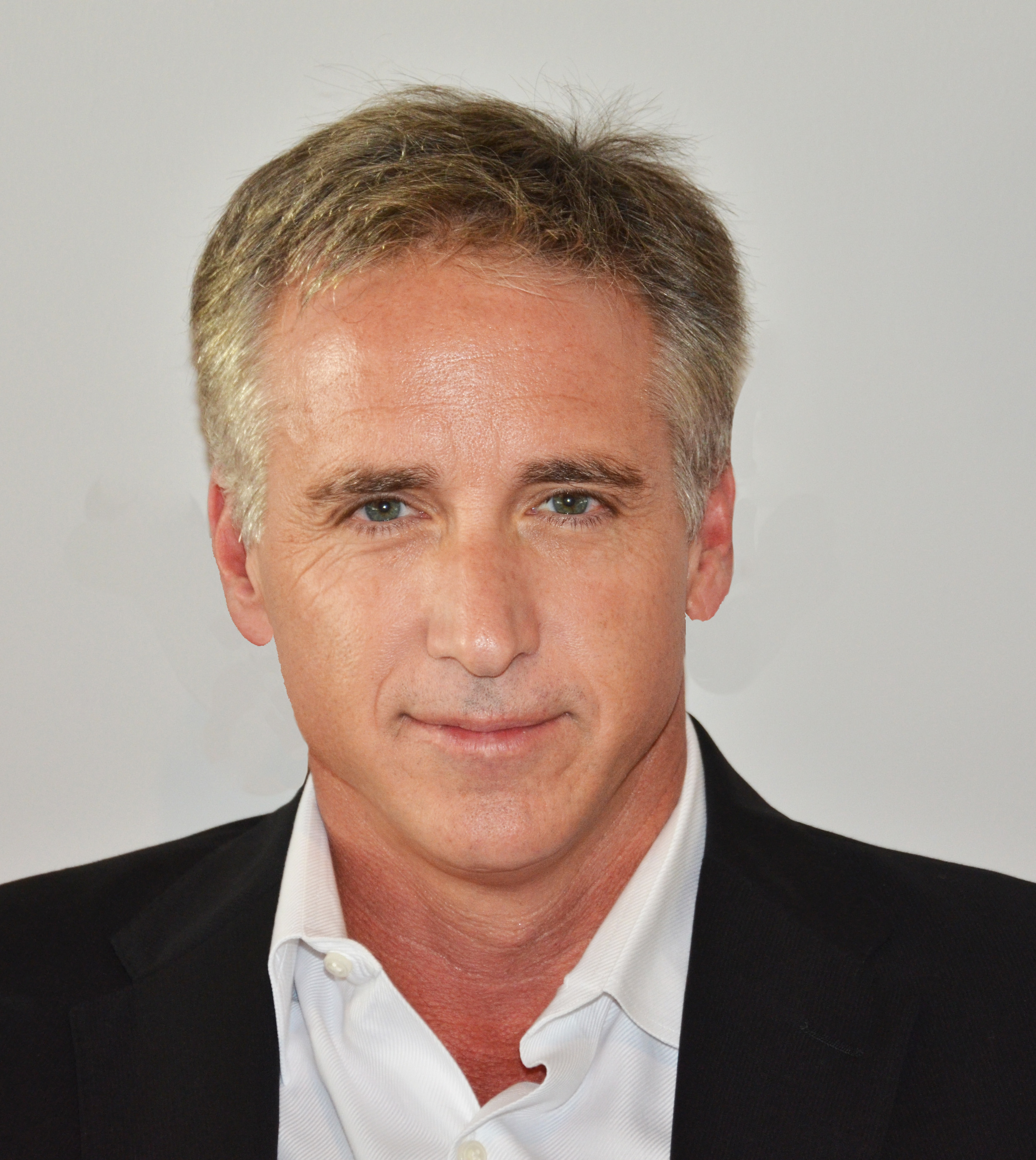

Former Houston City Council Member from E District
- In office January 2, 1996 – January 2, 2002
- Preceded by: Joe Roach
- Succeeded by: Addie Wiseman

Personal details
- Born: Robert Todd; October 23, 1963 (age 63) Kirksville, Missouri
- Children: 4
- Education: University of Texas at Austin; South Texas College of Law
- Occupation: EntrepreneurAttorney
- Profession: Real estate development Telecommunications
- Committees: Aviation; Ethics; Finance
- Faculty: South Texas College of Law; Adjunct professor of law

Rob Todd (born October 23, 1963) is a Houston-based entertainment attorney and former member of the Houston City Council from 1996 to 2002. Todd was a member of the Houston City Council from 1996 to 2002, representing the eastern edge of Houston.

Todd's district included the Johnson Space Center, William P. Hobby Airport, the Houston Ship Channel, and Lake Houston. He chaired the Regulatory Affairs Committee, the Charter Committee, and the Rail Committee. He was also a member of the Aviation, Ethics, and Finance Committees.

At the time of his initial election, Todd was the youngest person ever elected to Houston City Council at the age of 31 and has been a mainstay in the business community.

== Personal life ==
Todd was born in Kirksville, Missouri, and grew up partly as a farm boy and partly as an Army brat. By the time he graduated from High School he had lived in Missouri, Chicago, Portland, Oregon, Tillamook, Oregon, Leavenworth, Kansas, Augusta, Georgia, and Honolulu, Hawaii.

Todd is a graduate of Admiral Arthur W. Radford High School in Honolulu where he swam competitively for Punahou Aquatics with United States Swimming under Coach Steve Borowski, surfed and bagged groceries for the military commissary. After High School, he attended the University of Denver on an Athletic Scholarship before transferring to the University of Texas at Austin where he received his Bachelor of Arts degree in Latin American Studies. After his undergraduate degree, Todd received a Doctorate of Jurisprudence from the South Texas College of Law.

== Political career ==
Todd has a long and diverse history in politics and public service.

In 1990 Todd served as a Russian language interpreter at a round of the strategic arms limitation treaty negotiations between the Soviet Union and the United States between U.S. Secretary of State James Baker and Eduard Schevarnadze at the Houstonian Hotel, Club and Spa in Houston Texas.

Five years later, in 1995 Todd was elected to Houston City Council. As a City of Houston councilmember, given the public cost and effect on general road mobility, Todd opposed the expenditure of public funds on the installation of light rail without a public vote, and in 2001 filed suit against the Metropolitan Transit Authority of Harris County, to block the project and force a referendum. He argued that taxpayers should be allowed to consider the merits of light rail and have a vote. He succeeded and as a result, METRORail was put to a public vote. Ultimately, Metro enacted a public policy position that it should not initiate major light rail projects in the greater Houston area unless there was strong evidence that they would reduce air pollution or result in a major reduction in traffic congestion. This position was also supported by then United States Congress Majority Whip United States Congressman Tom DeLay and then Former Mayor Bob Lanier.

In his capacity as chairman of the Regulatory Affairs Committee, Todd supported the passage of ordinances aimed at addressing the needs of the homeless in the context of aggressive panhandling, dumpster diving and camping.

Todd is irreverent. His electronic access card to City Hall was briefly erased as a joke by Mayor Bob Lanier in 1997 after Todd wrapped the Mayor's chair with leftover "Free Kingwood" banners from an anti-annexation rally for that locality in opposition to the government action as he walked to his seat at the table.

Since 2012, Todd has been Chairman of the City of Houston Tower Permit Commission, which has jurisdiction over Cellular towers within a 572-square-mile (1,480 km^{2}) area of southeast Texas. This commission is tasked with improving 911 reception within the Houston city limits and extra-territorial jurisdiction.

In a 2015 article from Houston society magazine Lights, Camera, Action, Rob Todd was asked about his political future. As part of the magazine's Trailblazers series which features successful entrepreneurs, Todd said, "I get encouraged to run all the time. For now, my kids need my full attention so it will have to wait. Eventually...the time will be right."

== Legal career ==
Todd is an entertainment and civil trial lawyer with Hawash, Cicack and Gaston, LLP in Houston, Texas. He has practiced entertainment and public law since 1991. His current and former clients range from the Roy Rogers family, the Burt Reynolds family, E.S.G., Twisted Black, Baby Sam, Big Tyme, Ezzy Money, Shade 45 Sirius Radio host and Core DJ's Worldwide Shay Star and DJ Hollygrove, to celebrity astrologer Maren Altman.

Since 2003, Todd has been a popular adjunct professor of law at the South Texas College of Law, where he teaches a class on the legislative process. His teaching specialty is on the passage of legislation including the Voting Rights Act, Election Law, Public Corruption, Lobbying, and Entertainment Law.

== Activism ==
Todd's son Robert lost his hearing as an infant due to meningitis in 1988.

In his first year on City Council, Todd succeeded in efforts to provide closed captioning on Houston's government-information Government-access television (GATV) channel so that weekly televised city council meetings would be accessible to the hearing-impaired.

In 1997 Todd was success in persuading the Hobby Center and the Houston Rodeo to add closed captioning to their performances.

In 2003 Todd brought a lawsuit against several movie distributors and producers under the Americans With Disabilities Act, with Robert—then in the ninth grade—as the primary plaintiff. The suit sought to force the companies to provide more films with captioning for the hearing-impaired.

Rob Todd served as an attorney for 27-year-old Ariana Venegas in 2009 during a high-profile sexual harassment lawsuit against Harris County District Court judge Donald Jackson. Jackson was convicted of offering to dismiss Venegas's case in exchange for sex.[20][21]

Since July 30, 2015 Rob Todd has been an active member of Partnership for Baylor College of Medicine.

Since 2022 Todd has been general counsel for Accion Social Venezuela—Houston. This humanitarian group provides services for recent Venezuelan Immigrants to Houston.

== Technology career ==
In 2003, after leaving city council, Rob Todd founded Amplified Solutions, a real-estate and telecommunications development firm that designs, implements, finances and manages distributed antenna systems, which are advanced antenna systems that support wireless reception for large-scale venues. Amplified Solutions has successfully designed and implemented systems for the Chicago White Sox, Detroit Red Wings, Detroit Pistons, Milwaukee Bucks, Memorial Hermann Healthcare Systems, the Detroit Energy Music Theater and W Hotels. In 2015, Amplified Solutions was appointed to the Houston Business Journal's Fast 100 List and subsequently interviewed. The list commemorates the 100 fastest growing companies in Houston.
