= Procurement software =

Business software supporting purchasing and sourcing processes

Procurement software is a category of business software that helps organisations manage the acquisition of goods and services from external suppliers. It typically supports the procure-to-pay (P2P) or source-to-pay (S2P) cycle by providing tools to request, approve, order, receive and pay for purchases, and to manage supplier information and contracts.

Procurement applications are used in both private and public procurement to replace paper- or e-mail-based workflows with digitised processes, increase visibility of organisational spending, and enforce procurement policies and controls. In the early 2020s, the worldwide procurement software market was estimated at around US$6.6 billion in annual revenue, with analysts forecasting growth to about US$8.6 billion by 2029 as organisations adopt cloud-based and AI-enabled procurement platforms.

== History ==
The market for procurement software emerged in the 1980s as Manufacturing Resource Planning (MRP) systems such as SAP, ASK, and Oracle began incorporating modules for managing procure-to-pay processes. Early solutions focused largely on purchase orders, receiving and invoicing. As the market matured, more comprehensive sourcing, contract management, invoice automation, and spend analytics features were introduced.

During the first internet boom, dedicated e-procurement software systems were available from companies like Ariba and Commerce One to automate the purchase requisition process by allowing users to browse online catalogs to view products and services from approved suppliers.

In 2004, Oracle acquired PeopleSoft, including its nascent PeopleSoft eProcurement module, and subsequently expanded and rebranded this portfolio as Oracle Procurement. SAP introduced its own e-procurement solution (Enterprise Buyer Professional), which became SAP SRM in 2005 and was later succeeded by the cloud-based SAP Ariba network and SAP S/4HANA procurement modules.

In 2012, SAP announced the acquisition of Ariba for approximately US$4.3 billion.

By the 2010s and 2020s, the procurement software market was characterised by a mix of integrated suites and best-of-breed applications that connect via APIs and other integration mechanisms to finance, inventory, supply chain management and customer relationship management systems. Vendors increasingly delivered procurement functionality as cloud services, with mobile and SaaS deployment models allowing organisations to roll out purchasing tools to a broader user base.

== Functionality ==
Software functions include issuing and evaluating tenders, raising and approving purchase orders, selecting and ordering the product or service, receiving and matching the invoice and order, and payment of invoices, enabling the procurement department to see everything that is ordered, ensure that nothing can be ordered without correct approvals, and secure the best value by combining several orders for the same type of good or even getting suppliers to bid for the business. A buying organisation's choice of software may be driven by the particular strengths offered by each individual system and the number of vendors available through them. A multinational or other large organization will use a shared procurement system to take advantage of economies of scale to drive down the cost of purchases. Whilst some services are available to purchase through automated systems, the key strength of these systems lies in the procurement of commodities that are much easier to standardize.

More recent generations of procurement software incorporate artificial intelligence and machine learning to automate classification of spend data, recommend suppliers or negotiation strategies, detect anomalies in invoices and support predictive risk and compliance checks.

== Deployment models and integration ==
Procurement software may be delivered as an on-premises application installed on an organisation's own servers, or as a hosted or SaaS solution accessed over the internet. Cloud-based procurement platforms became increasingly common from the late 2000s onward as organisations sought to reduce the cost and complexity of maintaining on-premises software and to support distributed workforces and suppliers.

== Mobile procurement ==
The growth of smartphones and mobile internet access in the 2010s led vendors to develop mobile procurement applications that allow users to raise, approve and track purchase requests from handheld devices.

== Market and vendors ==
A 2025 report by Apps Run The World estimated that the worldwide procurement software market generated about US$6.6 billion of revenue in 2024 and forecast growth to roughly US$8.6 billion by 2029, corresponding to a compound annual growth rate of just over 5 per cent. The same analysis identified SAP, Coupa, Oracle, Ivalua, Jaggaer, Workday, Unite (formerly Mercateo), and GEP among the largest global providers of procurement applications, alongside specialised vendors such as Achilles, GHX, Precoro, SmartERP, Tamarin AI, and Taulia.
