= Spend analysis =

Spend analysis or spend analytics is the process of collecting, cleansing, classifying and analyzing expenditure data with the purpose of decreasing procurement costs, improving efficiency, and monitoring controls and compliance. It can also be leveraged in other areas of business such as inventory management, contract management, complex sourcing, supplier management, budgeting, planning, and product development.

== Overview ==
Spend analysis is often viewed as part of a larger domain known as spend management which incorporates spend analysis, commodity management, industry spend benchmarking, and strategic sourcing. Companies perform a spend analysis for several reasons. The core business driver for most organizations is profitability. In addition to improving compliance and reducing cycle times, performing detailed spend analysis helps companies find new areas of savings that previously went untapped, and hold on to past areas of savings that they have already negotiated.

There are three core areas of spend analysis - visibility, analysis, and process. By leveraging all three, companies can generate answers to the crucial questions affecting their spending, including:

- What am I really spending?
- With whom am I spending it?
- Am I getting what was promised for that spend?

Spend visibility helps chief procurement officers (CPOs), category managers (retail and wholesale) and senior financial officers to gain insight into what their company buys and from whom, and it helps them realize savings promised by past sourcing efforts. It plays an important role in enabling procurement teams to plan and prioritise their work and is a useful tool for a new-in-post procurement leader aiming to make a positive impact on an organisations costs.

== Spend cube analysis ==
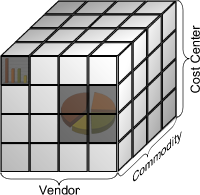
Spend Cube

A spend cube is a review of spend data presented as a three-dimensional cube. The contents in the cube are the price and volume of items purchased. Dimensions of the cube usually reviewed include:

1. Comparative spend with different suppliers or vendors.
2. Stakeholders or cost centers buying the category.
3. Categories of a commodity purchased by the organization.

== Software ==
Automated spend analysis software are used by chief procurement officers (CPOs) at various enterprises, and a useful tool for many others.
