= Sally Forth (Greg Howard comic strip) =

American comic strip

- Author(s): Greg Howard (1982–1997); Steve Alaniz (1997–2002); Francesco Marciuliano (1997–present)
- Illustrator(s): Greg Howard (1982–1992); Craig MacIntosh (1992–2013); Jim Keefe (2013–present)
- Website: www.sallyforth.com
- Current status/schedule: Active
- Launch date: January 4, 1982; 44 years ago
- Syndicate: King Features Syndicate
- Genre: Humor

Sally Forth is a daily comic strip created by Greg Howard in 1982 and distributed by King Features Syndicate, focusing on the life of an American middle-class mother at home and work. Sally's name is a play on words: "to sally forth" means to set out on an adventure.

In 1991 Craig MacIntosh began doing the drawing. In 1999, Howard quit writing as well and turned the task of writing the strip over to Francesco Marciuliano and Steve Alaniz. Jim Keefe took over the artwork in 2013 from Craig MacIntosh, with Marciuliano continuing to write after Alaniz retired from full-time work on Sally Forth.

== Characters ==
=== Sally and her family ===
- Sally Forth (née Jansen) – The main character, a 40-year-old HR manager with a husband and daughter. She wryly comments on the eccentric behavior of those around her. Following a time skip in the comic on September 3, 2019, Sally was out of a job and looking for job opportunities. She eventually got hired and worked at two separate jobs.
- Ted Forth – Sally's hopelessly devoted husband, light-hearted with goofball tendencies. Born on Long Island, he is a perpetually 40-year-old white-collar professional working in strategic sourcing, but he was unemployed from May 2007 to May 2008. Ted has four brothers: Timmy, Tommy, Tate and Terry. He only seems to think "outside the box", leading him into conflict with family and co-workers. Ted is obsessed with pop culture from his youth, often making references to Star Wars and other science fiction from the era. People find Ted to be a refreshing and realistic portrait of modern fatherhood. For a long while neither his 12-year-old daughter Hilary nor the reader knew Ted's profession. Ted's job, strategic sourcing, was finally mentioned in the strip published on March 8, 2008. He becomes highly competitive while coaching girls' softball. He was originally put at odds with his mother-in-law, who originally used to insult his masculinity, and his favorite food is meatloaf. He actually does gladly deeply care for his mom-in-law.
- Hilary "Hil" Forth – Sally and Ted's daughter who has aged during the strip. She is currently in the eighth grade, along with her best friend, Faye. She is very interested in music and sports. From late June 2011 to late August 2011, she developed a relationship with Jon, who was visiting for the summer. Despite having a (rather problematic) long-distance relationship that lasted for four years, she eventually breaks up with Jon in early 2016. Following their breakup, Hil became despondent, but after some time decided to go to summer camp in order to brighten up. After arriving at the camp, however, she immediately felt out of place, even when Bree (an outgoing girl) tried to cheer her up. After a moment of reflection (which included a talk with her 10-years-in-the-future self), Hil decided to become more positive, if not responsible.

Like many comic strips, Sally Forth employs a floating timeline, where time passes but most characters never age. In September 2014, Hilary (in a leaning-on-the-fourth-wall moment) observes to her mother that she was 12 when her cousin Bettina was born, and is still 12, while her cousin is turning one year old. Since the comic's 2019 time skip, Hilary is 14 (and in the eighth grade). In a 2024 series of strips, while visiting New York City with her parents, Hilary meets the 24-year-old version of herself, who shows the younger Hilary her future, where she lives in the city as a successful budding artist.

- Kitty – The Forths' cat, usually only seen in Hilary's room.
- Jackie Adams (née Jansen) – Sally's younger sister, prone to juvenile behavior and in general a flippant, impulsive contrast to Sally's responsible personality. She married Sally's former boss, Ralph, in summer 2012; originally, Sally was opposed to her sister marrying her former boss, but eventually came to accept their marriage. She later gave birth to a daughter, Bettina, in September 2013. Jackie opens a small sundry store, "Small Wonders", usually being barely able to break even, until one week, when her mother runs the store while Jackie and Ralph are away, and her mother makes a small fortune running a questionable side-business in the back of the store. When Ralph is offered a high-potential job, with Jackie the opportunity to run a country store in the same area, Jackie, Ralph, and Bettina move.
- Bettina Adams – Jackie and Ralph's daughter, born and introduced in the strips of September 23–29, 2013. Sally has since then become overly proud of her new niece, which is hinted to have sparked a want for another child, something that Ted is dreading. It was revealed at Thanksgiving that Jackie named her daughter after their (Jackie and Sally's) childhood pet cat. After the comic's 2019 time skip, Bettina has started learning to speak. Bettina also, whenever her family and the Forths meet, tends to stay close to Hilary, almost clinging to her. In the March 3, 2025 strip, Bettina gets a new puppy which she names Sir Reginald Thornwick.
- Laura – The mother of Sally and Jackie, who was originally very critical and highly opinionated of Sally, her family, and pretty much everyone else. She originally was prone to tormenting and berating Ted. She was often shown drinking wine. Her infrequent appearances were originally dreaded by all. Despite her formerly mean attitude, she is good-hearted, means well, works hard, and cares for her family. Her boyfriend, Gerald, appears senile, rendering him incapable of socializing; over time, his presence has become more and more questionable as he is depicted as being almost ghost-like. By the fall of 2023, Laura moves into a retirement home and seems to enjoy socializing with the other residents there. During Christmas of 2023, when Laura openly criticizes Jackie's life choices, Sally finally snaps and yells at Laura, pointing out all her flaws and how her constant mean criticisms, hostile opinions and saying the wrong thing are going to drive everyone away from her, including her family. After seeing how close Sally, Ted, and Hilary are as a family, Laura readily apologizes to her daughters and happily promises to improve herself (though Sally still privately looks up possible therapists for Laura). In the summer of 2024, Laura takes over Jackie's store, "Small Wonders", while she and Ralph are away on vacation, even though she has no experience on running a store. Calling her friends, Laura gets connections to instead run an illegal casino in the back of the store, which makes much more money, allowing Jackie to sell the store and move her family to Ralph's new job. In the process, though, Laura seems to have finally patched things up with Jackie and Sally.

=== Sally's workplace ===
- Ralph Adams – Sally's former boss in human resources, Ralph is a caricature of incompetent and self-centered business leadership. Ralph was eventually fired and reduced to working at a fast-food restaurant, but in 2006 returned to co-manage the department with Sally. In 2009, he became the sole manager of human resources while Sally became manager of marketing, which was staffed by several lazy, whiny employees who constantly challenged Sally. Sally suffers further anguish from Ralph in 2010 when he starts dating her sister Jackie. In April 2011, it was announced simultaneously that the marketing department would be closed, Ralph would become a consultant so he and Jackie could start a business, and Sally would return to HR as its sole director. Married Sally's sister in 2012; their engagement caused a rift between the sisters for a time as Sally did not approve of the relationship. He became a father age 63. Their daughter, Bettina (named for Jackie's cat), was born and introduced in the strips of September 23–29, 2013. Ralph now teaches business classes at a college.
- Alice Sharples – An employee in HR, and Sally's main confidante at work, Alice is sardonic, self-serving and romantically frustrated. After threatening to leave for 20 years, she finally did so, much to Sally's chagrin, in 2014. Alice made her reappearance on the July 1, 2015 strip for Sally's Fourth of July party, sporting a new hairstyle and new eyeglasses. She later offered a job to Sally after the latter had been out of work for some time and became her boss, although her sardonic/self-centered behavior has started to bother Sally.
- Jeff – Sally's blandly competent boss until the comic's 2019 time skip.
- Cynthia Keys – A new employee who was introduced in the March 5, 2015 strip. Sally, upon rejecting several oddball job seekers for Alice's position, meets Cynthia and is satisfied with her resume and reasoning for finding a new job. For a time, Sally became rather worried that Cynthia is maybe a little too perfect to replace Alice and, if not hired, could find a job at a different company. In the March 20 strip, Sally has decided to hire her; Cynthia made her first job appearance in the April 8, 2015 strip. Both women get along rather well - they occasionally go out to lunch with each other. The April 10, 2015 strip reveals that she is an aunt to one of the girls (Jenny) on Ted's softball team and is astounded by his extremely competent behavior, much to Sally's discomfort. Cynthia hasn't been seen since the comic's 2019 time skip.

=== Other characters ===
- Faye Simmons – Hilary's best friend as of the start of middle school. She comes from a less ideal family than the Forths, cultivates a somewhat rebellious image (which she later changed somewhat over time), and is often blunt to the point of meanness with adults. She was introduced February 4, 2006. She and Hilary started a band (eventually called New Delhi Monkey Gang) and later added Nona. At times, she and Hilary are at odds on certain issues – an example at one point in 2014, when Hilary made a pop song "You're So Party, Let's Go Dancey", Faye disagreed with playing the song and Hilary's ideas of becoming a commercialized mainstream band, leading Hilary to go solo temporarily. Later, both girls apologized and Hilary rejoined the band. Faye's mother, Mrs. Simmons, has also appeared in the strip. For a time in early 2021, Faye moved in with the Forths when her mother was seeking a new place to live (which saddened both Faye and Hil); eventually, she found a new place that allowed Faye to move back with her mother and stay with her friends.
- Nona – Hilary and Faye's classmate. She was introduced October 8, 2008. She comes from a rich family and has a recording studio, indoor theater, and a guesthouse at her house. She also has a Wii system that can output high-definition video, a function unavailable on the actual device. She writes songs and claims she can play every instrument. However, Hilary and Faye are/were a little mixed about Nona due to her slight naive-yet-eccentric demeanor. To their dismay, Nona became estranged from Hilary and Faye in late 2012, and, in 2013, had made new friends. She eventually reunited with Hilary and Faye during the summer, after revealing that her new friends only used her. Nona is also recently known to have the ability to read Hilary's, and later Faye's, thoughts. In the summer of 2016, when Hil leaves for summer camp, Faye believes that Nona has developed a crush on Jon (who returned for the summer) since they began to realize they have a little more in common. However, it was revealed that it was Jon who developed a crush; at first Nona says nothing. But after a confrontation, Faye admits Nona probably returns those feelings. This was confirmed since it appeared she got along well with Jon up until the 2017 summer when he revealed that he would no longer visit for the summer; Nona was shocked, but Jon reassured her that they would stay in touch.
- Aria – Ted's co-worker, referred to by Alice as his "office wife" who seems to share Ted's enthusiasm for '70s and '80s pop culture, much to Sally's consternation. Since 2010, Aria hasn't been featured in any strips (indicating that she was probably written out of the comic).
- Jon – A boy visiting the area for the summer of 2011, he is from out of town and met Hilary at an Independence Day picnic. After getting to know each other, Jon and Hilary became a couple. He returned for the summer of 2012 and spent more time with Hilary. During the summer of 2013, he returned to visit Hilary again; however, she started to worry that she was not spending time with her friends but she still wanted to spend time with him. Fortunately, Jon still cared for her, thus setting her worries aside. In 2014, he experienced a growth spurt, which Hilary took a while to get used to. In 2015, Hil and Jon began to experience their relationship reaching an impasse, with hints in August and September that they would break up; during the winter of 2015, Jon was unable to visit Hil for Christmas. In the January 16, 2016 strip, it was confirmed that they have broken up (as indicated by a distraught Hil alone in her room). He eventually comes back for the summer, hoping to patch things up with Hil, but was shocked to know that she went to summer camp. While she is gone, he spends time with both Faye and Nona, which makes Faye uncomfortable (mostly due to the fact that Nona might have a crush on Jon). However, it was revealed that it was Jon with the crush, not Nona, and when he attempts to ask her out, Faye interrupts and both girls leave, not wanting to betray Hilary's feelings. In the summer of 2017 (particularly the strips from the days of August 3rd to the 12th), Jon revealed that he would no longer visit for the summer; while Hil readily accepted this, Nona was shocked but she happily accepted this as Jon reassured her that they would still keep in touch.
- Ted's parents – Ted's mother and father, whose visits or appearances on visits to them, were originally dreaded by the Forths. Ted's father was originally a crass and chauvinistic husband who originally expected Sally to wait on him hand and foot like his own wife and takes anything Ted says as an invitation to argue, while Ted's mother was originally a depressive, browbeaten homemaker who originally saw the worst in any given situation. Despite originally fearing the Forth's occasional visits, they gladly deeply care for their siblings. Around 2016, Ted's father developed symptoms of dementia, which had greatly troubled Ted. In October 2017, his health took a turn for the worse (revealing that he was on his deathbed); his death was confirmed on the November 6, 2017 strip. Following his father's death, Ted was inconsolable for a time until he was able to pick up the pieces of his life and move on. In the summer of 2022, Ted's mother announced to her son that she was selling the house and was going to move in with a neighbor named Ronan; Ted was troubled by this chain of events but has readily accepted his mother's plans.
- Jenny – A girl who is one of the teammates on Hil's softball team. She is very critical of Ted's coaching and even bluntly mentions criticisms of him, to which he does not take very kindly. It was revealed in 2015 that she is the niece of Cynthia Keys. In the August 21, 2017 strip, Hil introduced Jenny as a new member of her band. Even though she's friends with Hil and the others, she observes their mannerisms as odd and is rather hesitant to accept herself being a new friend to them. Following both Ted's retirement of coaching the softball team and the comic's 2019 time skip, Jenny has slightly toned down her criticism of Ted and has - on some occasions - stopped by to check on him and offer him advice with any issue he's facing.
- Duncan – A boy introduced in the April 15, 2017 strip, he met up with Hilary when she and her band had performed at their school's dance; although reception from the audience to her band was lukewarm, he praised Hil's performance. In the strips that followed the following week, it appeared that Duncan and Hil were starting to have some feelings for each other. Duncan reappeared in the October 6th and 7th strips when he and Hil were thinking of what to wear for Halloween, with Hil even going as far as suggesting the two of them dress up as a duo. He is also revealed to have a brother.

== Recurring themes ==
- Sally has a quirky habit of eating the ears off of her daughter's chocolate Easter bunnies. Hilary annually schemes to hide her bunny but usually fails. As a result, Hilary is frustrated while Sally reacts indifferently and with no remorse.
- The Forth family has long dreamed of taking a vacation in Paris and has been on the verge of departing several times, only to have some unexpected tragedies or complications stop them. The family even mention this unfortunate dilemma at times when they face a similar outcome.
- Hillary with her two best friends, Faye and Nona, has a band that produced the original and bad remixes of "You're So Party, Let's Go Dancey" much to the dissatisfaction of Faye and Hil's parents, though Ted wholeheartedly supports her endeavors.
- Several strips in 2006 and 2007 alluded to the fact that no one really knew what Ted's job was, a metatextual reference to the often vague nature of comic characters' employment. After his layoff, Hilary frets that they will never know the truth. On March 8, 2008, Ted mentions for the first time that his job was/is strategic sourcing—a procurement initiative run by several Fortune 500 companies.
- Almost every autumn (or rarely some other season), the Forths venture into a corn maze and get hopelessly lost.
- Ted coached Hilary's all-girls softball team, which is so bad that it rarely, if ever, wins a game. The team performed so poorly that Ted once made a wild promise that they would go on a trip to Walt Disney World if it won the league championship; however, he expected not to have to follow through with the promise. Though personally enthusiastic, Ted seemed to have fatalistically accepted the team's losing streak and took to giving pre-game pep talks made up of equal parts exasperation and stream-of-consciousness rambling; one talk featured a quote from The Godfather. Because of this, Ted was discouraged from coaching the team during the 2008 version of the storyline. In 2011, however, the team did win the championship for their league to which Ted overreacted in joy that he finally accomplished something. Afterward, up until 2016, the team was back in the cellar of the league, much to Ted's dismay. In the summer of 2016, the softball team won their second championship, although Hil was not with the team since she was away at a summer camp; nevertheless, Ted (while excited at having won the championship again) was grateful to see Hil return.

Another part of this recurring theme is that the girls on the team mention their parents' negative opinions of Ted's coaching, which Ted reacts rather harshly towards while Hilary either tries to intervene or just does not bother.

- Ted sometimes appears aware that he is in a comic strip, making vague references to the floating timeline they are in, and occasionally seeming to break the fourth wall and address the reader directly, to the complete confusion of all the other characters. In 2015, other characters have pondered about their existence in a strip and its plot.

== Books ==
- Sally Forth by St. Martin's Press, 1982. ISBN 0-312-69745-7
- Sally Forth A Woman's Work is Never Done by Fawcett Columbine, 1988. ISBN 0-449-90261-7
- I Gave at the Office by Andrews McMeel, 1994. ISBN 0-8362-1743-8
