= DIFOT =

Measurement of delivery performance in supply chain management

DIFOT (delivery in full, on time) or OTIF (on-time and in-full [delivery]) is a measurement of logistics or delivery performance within a supply chain. Usually expressed as a percentage, it measures whether the supply chain was able to deliver:

- the expected product (reference and quality)
- in the quantity ordered by the customer
- at the place agreed by the customer
- at the time expected by the customer (in many cases, with a tolerance defined in conjunction with the customer).

== Function ==
OTIF measures how often the customer gets what they want at the time they want it. Some consider it superior to other delivery performance indicators, such as shipped-on-time (SOT) and on-time performance (OTP), because it looks at deliveries from the point of view of the customer.

Although commonly referred to as On-Time In-Full (OTIF), similar supplier compliance metrics operate under different names across the retail industry. Examples include On Time Fill Rate (OTFR) at Target and Original Requested Arrival Date (ORAD) at Kroger. These metrics are used to evaluate delivery timeliness and order completeness.

This key performance indicator (KPI) has the advantage of measuring the performance of the whole logistic organization in meeting customer service expectations. To reach a high OTIF level, all the functions of the supply chain (among which orders taking, procurement, suppliers, warehouses, transport ...) must work at their best level.

== Calculation ==
Generally OTIF is calculated by taking into account the number of deliveries:

OTIF ( % ) = number of deliveries OTIF ÷ total number of deliveries * 100

But it can also, according to organizations, be calculated according to the number of orders or the number of the order lines.

Some organizations calculate OTIF by the percentage of the total order quantity that has been on-time. This goes against the principle of OTIF as the in-full component of OTIF has not been met.

Requirements for the OTIF measurement are :

- have a delivery date (even hour for some organizations) stated on the customer order or specified by the customer
- measure the date or the hour of delivery and archive it in the system
- maintain record of the reasons why an order was not OTIF.

If the orders are split at the customer request, then each delivery line is considered.

Companies which have set up a measure of the OTIF are unanimous in recognising its value. They quote among other positive aspects: the increase in operating profit due to the reduction of operating expenses (in relation with the non-quality reduction, better inventory control, better customer orders taking, higher reliability in storage and transport ...) and the increase of sales (due to a better product availability for sales).

Typically, leading practice in the [UK] retail sector identified by researchers Janet Godsell and Remko van Hoek would demand an OTIF in excess of 97 per cent measured at a stock keeping unit (SKU) level. However Godsell's research also found that instances where an OTIF target was met when measured against a target of the promised delivery date stated by the supplier to the customer (the "promise date"), would often fail to meet the same performance measure when the delivery date requested by the customer (the "request date") was used as the target.

The OTIF notion was extended to DIFOTAI (delivery in full, on time, and accurately invoiced), which also takes into account the quality of the invoicing.
