= Chief procurement officer =

Highest level executive in charge of acquiring goods and services at a company

A chief procurement officer (CPO) undertakes an executive role within an enterprise, focusing on sourcing, procurement, and supply management.

Typically, a CPO is responsible for the management, administration, and supervision of the company's acquisition programs. They may be in charge of the contracting services and may manage the purchase of supplies, equipment, and materials. It is often his or her responsibility to source goods and services and to negotiate prices and contracts. Many CPOs report to a director or directly to the chief executive officer (CEO) of their company. In some organisations the role is named chief acquisition officer, e.g. in the United States Departments of Agriculture and of Labor.

== Focus of interest ==
A chief procurement officer and their department will often be responsible for:

- ensuring that goods and services are promptly delivered
- making sure that vendors are paid in a timely manner
- supplier relationship management.

Some CPOs are in charge of locating sources for supplies and services, and maintaining relations with suppliers and vendors. They usually negotiate with vendors to get the best prices and deals, utilizing the power of purchase and the economies of scale. Often they set up contracts between vendors and the company.

Aside from sourcing and negotiating prices and contracts, the CPO's staff usually work with a business's accounts payable function to ensure that vendors are paid on schedule. In addition, they usually keep inventory levels current and take responsibility for forecasting the future supply needs of the company.

Many industries employ procurement officers, from small companies to global organizations. In a small company, the procurement officer may work singly, but often there is a team that executes the purchasing for an organization. A chief procurement officer working for a multinational corporation might manage a globally-dispersed team.

Whether at a small company or a large one, the chief procurement officer usually provides overall leadership to the purchasing team and ensures that procurement policies and procedures are followed. Typically, they also are constantly in search of better quality products and better prices. In a lot of companies, all procurement decisions ultimately end up at the desk of the CPO.

The position of the chief procurement officer is believed by many to have taken on increased significance in corporations, and the role is thought to have grown more strategic in recent years. Globalization, compliance pressures, supply market risk, and procurement automation have simultaneously elevated the visibility of the procurement discipline within companies and increased supply management challenges. In response, procurement executives have established agendas for organizational transformation. These plans incorporate activities to bring more spending under management, enhance the procurement organization's skills and visibility, and increase both internal and external collaboration. Such pressures have also triggered a trend toward centralization of the procurement function for the purposes of standardization and leverage. Willem Uijen, CPO of Unilever, describes the procurement organization which he leads as "purpose-led, value-driven and future-fit organisation", Marco Gonçalves, CPO of Nestlé, has emphasised the role which procurement plays in making his company a "sustainable business".

Exceptional interpersonal and negotiation skills generally are required of successful chief procurement officers. Excellent oral and written communication skills may also be necessary. Fluency in additional languages also can be considered an asset, since vendors may be situated in other parts of the world.

== Research ==
A new Supply Management report published in July 2011 says that "76 percent of chief procurement officers (CPOs) feel the skills of their purchasing staff either 'need improvement' (65 percent) or display a 'significant gap' (11 percent), according to research from Ardent Partners. This survey of nearly 250 CPOs around the world includes a procurement competency matrix, which considered the higher-level skills a purchasing department should have. Contract management, category management, data analysis and presentation expertise were rated as average by CPOs, with no competencies achieving a good or excellent rating. The report said there was a 'picture of a very middle-of-the-road set of skills residing within the typical procurement department'. It also added: 'For the average department, opportunities for improvement abound'.

Many CPOs recognise the importance of collaborating with their organisation's chief financial officer (CFO) and that an operating environment that values cash, profit margins, and risk mitigation is one that plays to the primary skills and capabilities of a procurement organization. Some CFOs have become increasingly involved (directly via oversight or indirectly through improved collaboration) with the procurement function according to a 2011 research report which looked at the CFO's relationship with the procurement function and the Chief Procurement Officer. Andrew Bartolini has reviewed the history of this relationship, which from the 1990's was a "rocky" one, where the CFO worked at the highest levels of seniority within a business and the CPO occupied a middle-ranking position, to greater recognition of the role of the CPO and the contribution of the procurement function, trigged in particular by the Great Recession and the COVID-19 pandemic. Since 2020, Bartolini says that more open communication has been observed, with transparency and "active, formal and constant collaboration" becoming embedded in the relationship.

Cloud eProcurement and spend management company Wax Digital surveyed over 100 CPOs in 2013. The survey found that:

- The average career length to date of a CPO was 22 years
- The average age of a CPO was 46
- The youngest CPO in their survey was aged 35
- 79% were male and 21% were female
- 45% were graduates and 14% had an MBA qualification.
