= Rate contract =

A Rate Contract or a Rate Agreement (RC in short) is an agreement between a buyer and a supplier to obtain products for a fixed unit price or price variation over a specified period of time, as a procurement cost reduction strategy.

== Timing ==
A rate contract is usually attempted when a global sourcing effort is not feasible, due to financial or operational constraints. A rate contract is also typically established in inputs where the number of suppliers is large (where it is not a monopoly or an oligopoly).

== Level ==
Rate contracts can be arranged at various levels by a large firm - in specific geography markets or at a national level or at a global level (if suppliers exist at differing scales) and in specific sub-categories, or in a range of sub-categories, or for a category, or for a related categories. The rate contract can also be established for a year or for multiple-years. The level of the rate contract agreed depends on:

1. The level of standardization of the input
2. The predictability of procurement spend
3. The nature of the supplier market
4. The pricing power of the procurer as against the supplier.

== Process of setup ==
The process of setting up a rate contract in a category follows a set of standard steps:-

1. Procurement spend analysis: Identification of cumulative spend, identification of key suppliers and their share of business, identification of average price of procurement, spend growth projections
2. Market analysis: Study of the nature of the market, exhaustive identification of suppliers and their capabilities, study of supplier cost structures. One of the primary objectives of this step is the identification and introduction of new suppliers
3. Supplier Interactions: Selection of a fit-list of suppliers, invitation to suppliers for discussions, supplier discussions and interactions, RFQ to selected suppliers
4. Receipt of Quotes from suppliers
5. Selection of a fit list of suppliers
6. Agreement on the points of the rate contract and finalization of the rate contract

Post the setup of a rate contract, a definitive monitoring mechanism must be set up. Such a monitoring mechanism needs to be done centrally by the organization and involves - monitoring of offtake by supplier, monitoring of non-RC offtake and monitoring of supplies and periodic quality audits. Without the setup of a monitoring mechanism, much of the effectiveness and purpose for a setup might be lost.

== Special Types ==
A frame agreement is a special type of rate agreement entered with a set of suppliers, with a specific subset (may be just one) chosen as preferred. Frame agreements possess similar clauses as standard rate agreements with a few additional (optional) points such as

- decreasing prices over time
- quality control obligations for the supplier
- minimum or maximum offtakes during the validity period
- provisions for vendor-managed inventory

The UNHCR procures a large percentage of its requirements under frame agreements.

== See also ==
- Low cost country sourcing
- Tendering
