= Francesco Marciuliano =

American cartoonist and writer

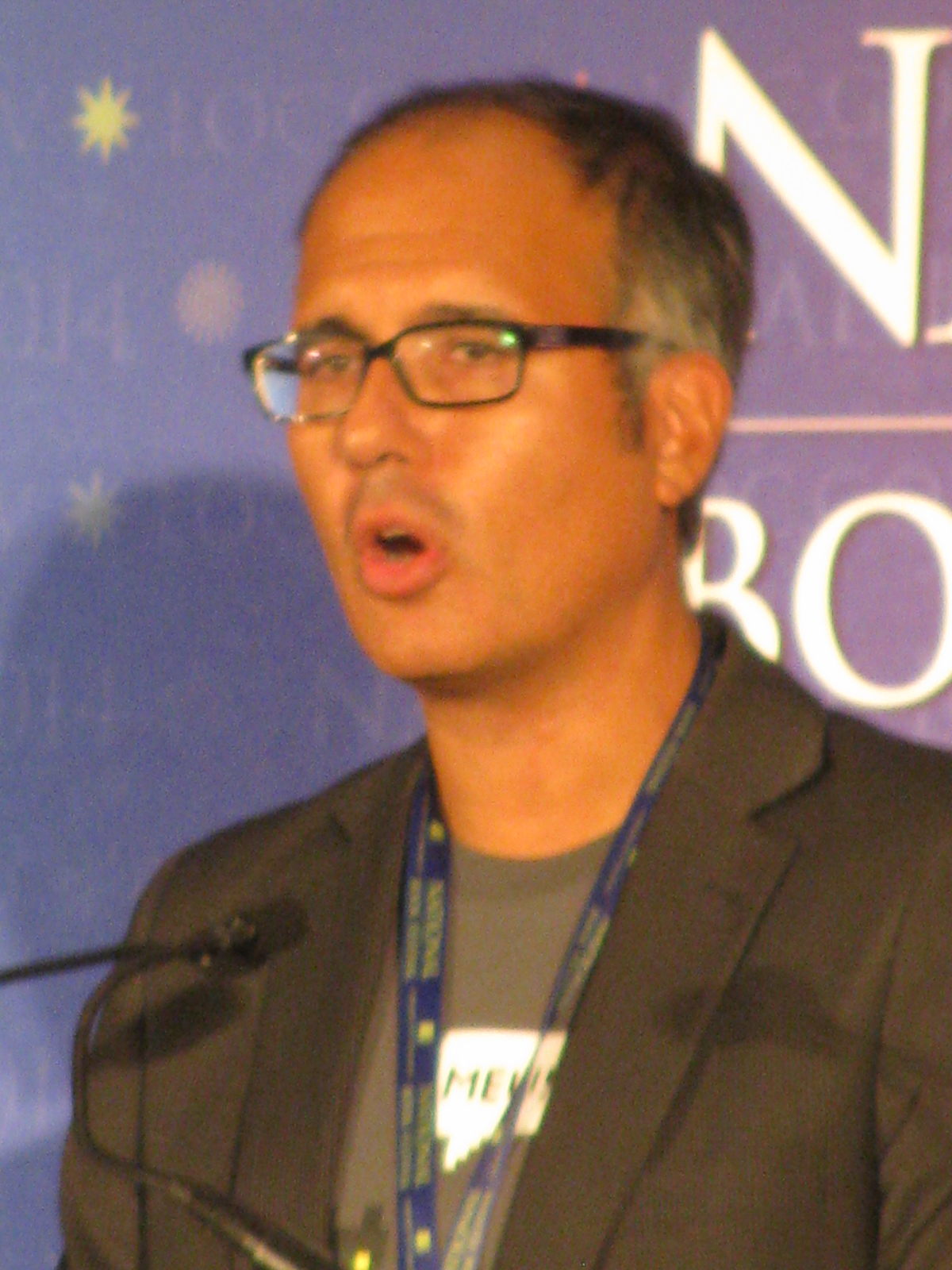
- Born: August 1967 (age 58–59)
- Education: Duke University
- Writing career
- Notable works: Sally Forth, I Could Pee on This and Other Poems by Cats, I Could Chew on This and Other Poems by Dogs, I Knead My Mommy and Other Poems by Kittens, Medium Large; Judge Parker

Francesco Marciuliano is the writer of the syndicated comic strips Sally Forth and Judge Parker. Marciuliano also wrote The New York Times bestselling book I Could Pee on This and Other Poems by Cats (2013), the national bestseller I Could Chew on This and Other Poems by Dogs (2013), and I Knead My Mommy and Other Poems by Kittens (2014). He also writes and draws the satiric webcomic Medium Large.

== Career ==
Marciuliano assumed writing duties for Sally Forth in 1999 after the strip's creator Greg Howard retired. Marciuliano had been working with Howard two years prior to taking over the writing duties. Since then he has introduced several regular-appearing characters to the comic including daughter Hilary's friends Faye and Nona, Sally's mom Laura and sister Jackie, and husband Ted's parents and brothers. Marciuliano has also received praise for his depiction of the breakout character of Ted Forth, a strategic sourcing professional who is married to the strip's title character and has changed significantly under his writing duties.

Marciuliano wrote a series of short comedies called "This Isn't Working," which was performed at the New York Fringe Festival in August 2005.

In August 2012, Chronicle Books published the humor book I Could Pee on This and Other Poems by Cats, a collection of poetry supposedly written by cats. The book became a New York Times bestseller, appeared on The Los Angeles Times bestseller list for a full year, and was the number two bestselling hardcover book for all of 2013 according to IndieBound. That was followed in August 2013 by I Could Chew on This and Other Poems by Dogs, featuring poetry in the voice of dogs, that appeared on several national bestseller lists. The third book in the series, I Knead My Mommy and Other Poems by Kittens, was published in August 2014. This was followed by You Need More Sleep: Advice from Cats in 2015 (a farcical advice book, not a book of poetry), Claw the System: Poems from the Cat Uprising in 2018, and All Cats Are Introverts in 2019. The pet poetry series has also spawned a series of wall calendars and greeting cards and is printed in several international editions.

In August 2016 Marciuliano began to write for Judge Parker.

In addition to his syndicated comic strip, Marciuliano writes and draws the webcomic Medium Large, which started in April 2004 and runs on both his own site as well as GoComics. He also presently writes for the humor site Smosh and has written for the Onion News Network and McSweeney's. In 2005 he had a collection of short comedic plays produced for the New York International Fringe Festival and from 2006 to 2008 he was the head writer for the PBS television series Seemore's Playhouse, for which he won two 2007 Regional Daytime Emmy Awards.

== Personal ==
Marciuliano was born in 1967 and raised in Dix Hills, New York. He graduated Duke University with a degree in English and currently lives in New York City, New York.

== Works ==
=== Comics ===
- Sally Forth
- Judge Parker
- Medium Large

=== Books / Novels ===
- I Could Pee on This And Other Poems by Cats
- I Could Chew on This : And Other Poems by Dogs
- You Need More Sleep : Advice from Cats
- I Could Pee on This, Too
- I Could Pee on This 2018 Wall Calendar
- Claw the System : Poems from the Cat Revolution
- I Knead My Mommy : And Other Poems by Kittens
- All Cats Are Introverts
