= Richard Smart (actor) =

American actor (1913–1992)

- Born: Richard Palmer Kaleioku Smart; May 21, 1913; Honolulu, Hawaii
- Died: November 13, 1992 (aged 79); Oahu
- Occupations: Actor, Rancher
- Spouse: Patricia Havens-Monteagle
- Children: Gilliard; Antony
- Parent(s): Henry Gaillard Smart; Annie Thelma Parker

Richard Palmer Kaleioku Smart (1913–1992) was an American musical theatre actor and singer who became owner of the largest private ranch in the United States.

== Early life ==
Richard Palmer Kaleioku Smart was born May 21, 1913, in Honolulu. In 1914 the family traveled to Europe, where his mother gave birth to a sister Elizabeth Ella Smart in Paris. By this time World War I was starting, so they hurriedly traveled back to New York City, where the sister died. His mother (born Annie Thelma Kahiluonapuaapiilani Parker) died shortly after this in San Francisco on November 14, 1914, from tuberculosis. A year later, his father Henry Gaillard Smart (son of a Virginia clergyman) died in November 1915, just after contesting the will. He was raised by his part-Hawaiian maternal grandmother, born Elizabeth Jane Lanakila Dowsett, by then remarried to Frederick Knight in San Francisco, usually called "Aunt Tootsie". Although he had many cousins, he became the sole owner of the Parker Ranch on Hawaiʻi Island, founded by his 5th generation ancestor John Palmer Parker (1790–1868). The ranch was managed by Alfred Wellington Carter from 1899 to 1937, then A.W.'s son Hartwell Carter. Already one of the largest owned by a single person (the King Ranch was owned by a corporation), the Carters expanded the operation further through the 20th century. The ranch had over 500,000 acres (200,000 ha) of land and 30,000 head of Hereford cattle. Smart was sent to Los Gatos High School and become interested in theater.

== Show business ==
Smart became a nightclub singer and performed in plays and musicals from 1933 to 1939. Director Joshua Logan hired him for the Broadway theatre production of Two for the Show in 1940. and he performed in The Merry Widow. Smart married actress Patricia Havens-Monteagle from Burlingame, California July 3, 1936, who lived in Beverly Hills, California. Known as Pat Monteagle, she appeared un-credited in the 1936 movie The Great Ziegfeld, but was more well known as a socialite. The family moved to Honolulu later in 1940, but then lived in California after the Attack on Pearl Harbor. About 40,000 acres (16,000 ha) of the ranch were leased to the United States Marines for use as Camp Tarawa. The second and fifth divisions trained there. He was divorced in 1944.

After the war he appeared under the name Dick Smart. In 1946 and 1947, he starred in the Broadway production of Bloomer Girl with Nanette Fabray and All for Love in 1949. Over nearly 30 years, Smart performed on Broadway and in cabarets in the U.S. and abroad. He headlined such clubs as the Coconut Grove in Los Angeles, the Monte Carlo in New York and Le Lido in Paris. After A.W. Carter died in 1949, Smart took a more active role in the ranch.

== Back to the ranch ==
As traditional cattle ranching began to lose money, Smart modernized and diversified the ranch's operation. In 1965 he leased land to Laurance Rockefeller for building the Mauna Kea Beach Hotel on Kaunaʻoa Bay of the Kohala Coast. It was land too dry for cattle, but popular with tourists. He opened a visitors center and museum, and developed entire new towns such as Waikoloa Village on his landholdings. His wealth was an estimated $400 million in 1990.

Starting in 1979 he built the 490-seat Kahilu theater (named after his mother's Hawaiian name) in the town of Waimea, on ranch land, where he performed in occasional productions.

In 1987, Smart sponsored a production of the Jerry Herman musical revue Showtune (then titled Tune the Grand Up) at the Kahilu Theatre. This was the first production of Showtune away from the United States mainland.

His most recent performance was in a one-man musical entitled "Richard Smart Remembers". Smart died July 4, 1992, in Oahu of cancer after a short illness. His estate was left in a trust to benefit North Hawaii Community Hospital, Hawaii Preparatory Academy, Hawaii Community Foundation, and Parker School.

James Michener said:

Richard Smart is clearly a talented man. But what really impresses me is how much he is respected by the local people–particularly the native Hawaiians who work for him.

Son Gilliard "Gil" Smart died in 1999, leaving daughter Willow Parker Smart. Antony Parker Smart was born August 8, 1937. Antony died June 26, 2007, in Honolulu, leaving daughter Stefanie Lee Havens Smart and son Parker Damon Smart. Stefanie Smart died on August 17, 2011.

== Family tree ==
Parker family tree

John Palmer Parker (1790–1868)	Kipikane (1800–1860)
John Palmer Parker II (1827–1891)	Ebenezer Parker (1829–1855)	Kilia Nahoalani (1834–1861)	Mary Ann Kaulalani (1819–1859)
Mary Parker Woods (1851–1909)	Harriet Panana Napela (1852–1901)	Samuel Parker (1853–1920)	Abigail Campbell (1858–1908)	Others
James Frank Woods (1872–1930)	Eva K. Parker (1874–1922)	John Palmer Parker III (1875–1894)	Elizabeth Jane Lanakila Dowsett (1872–1943)	Others
Others	Henry Gaillard Smart	Thelma Parker (1894–1914)
Richard Smart (1913–1992)	Patricia Havens-Monteagle (1913-1982)
Antony Parker Smart (1937-2007)	Gilliard "Gil" Smart (1940-1999)
