= James Frank Woods =

American politician

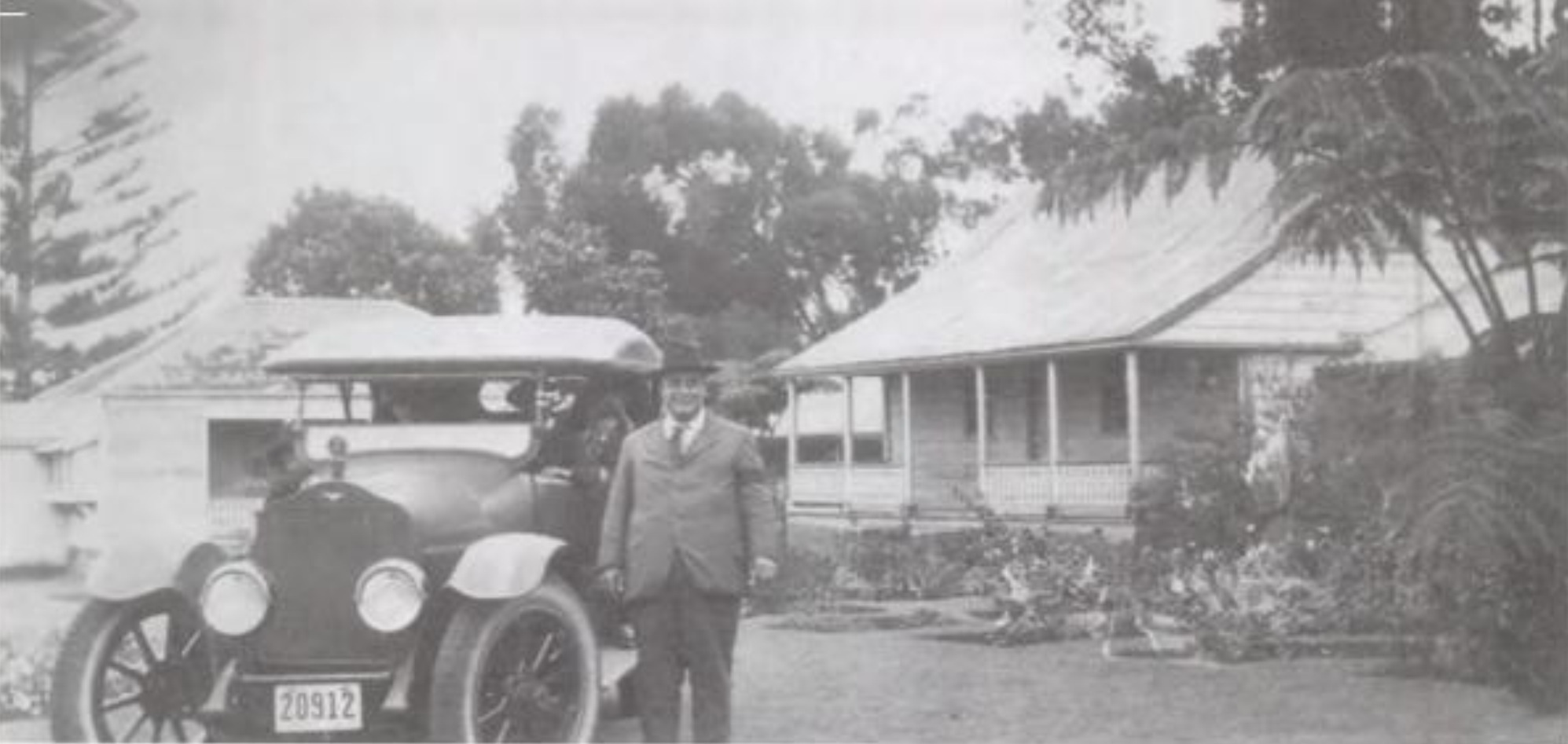
- Frank Wood at Mānā, 1923
- Born: June 27, 1872; Waimea, Hawaii County, Hawaii
- Died: June 24, 1930 (aged 57)
- Occupations: Rancher, Politician
- Spouses: Eva K. Parker; Princess Elizabeth Kahanu
- Parent(s): James Woods; Mary Ann Kaulalani Parker

James Frank Woods (June 27, 1872 – June 24, 1930) was a major landowner during the Kingdom of Hawaii who was related to royalty and many civil leaders.

== Life ==
His father was James Woods, who was born in Liverpool, England in 1845, and came to the Hawaiian Islands in 1860 to work for Janion & Green (later the "Big Five" firm Theo H. Davies & Co.), which had been based in England. In 1866, his father moved to the cattle-ranching area known as Waimea where he worked to import improved cattle breeds to replace the wild cattle that had previously roamed the island of Hawaiʻi. He served in a number of government posts in the Kohala district including a term in the legislature of the Hawaiian Kingdom, and eventually became part owner of several sugarcane plantations in Hawaii and cattle ranches.

On March 22, 1868 his father married his mother Mary Ann Kaulalani Parker (1851–1909), three-quarters native Hawaiian granddaughter of John Palmer Parker (1790–1868), founder of Parker Ranch. James Frank Woods was born June 27, 1872, and generally went by the name Frank Woods. He had seven siblings, five sisters and two brothers. When his father died in December 1883, the Kohala and Puʻuhue ranches passed to brothers Samuel Parker Woods (1877–1937) and Palmer Parker Woods (1872–1923).

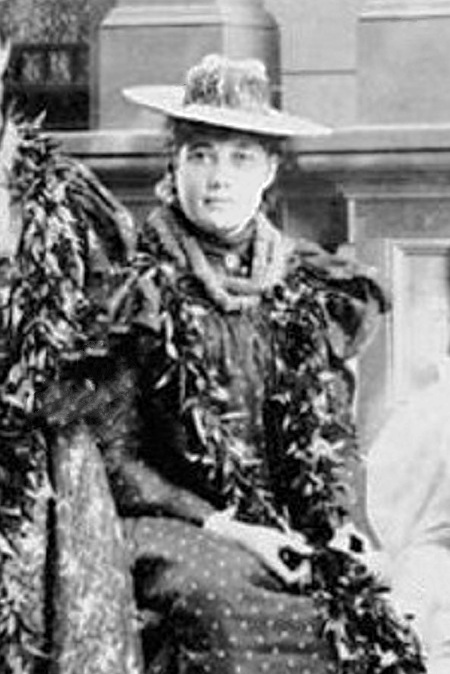
Wife Eva Kalanikauleleaiwi Parker

In 1895, Woods bought Kahuā ranch from John Maguire, at about 3,000 feet (910 m) elevation at 20°7′22″N 155°47′12″W. He also leased much of the surrounding land and started his own cattle business. He tried to convert some of the land into a sugarcane plantation, but his attempts to divert the nearby Kehna Ditch irrigation canal to his dry lands on the leeward side of Kohala Mountain were thwarted. He leased the Mākua Valley (on the western coast of Oʻahu island, 21°31′51″N 158°13′30″W) to fatten his cattle on their way to the market in Honolulu. The land is now the Mākua Military Reservation.

Woods married his cousin Eva Kalanikauleleaiwi Parker, second daughter of Samuel Parker. He was the first vice-chairman of the board of supervisors for Hawaii County when it was organized. After losing several elections in the Home Rule Party of Hawaii, he won in 1913 for a single term in the Territorial Senate as a member of the Democratic Party of Hawaii. Woods entertained Jack London and Charmian London when they visited. A small cottage built for the Woods family is preserved as a museum in the Manua Lani resort.

Eva died on December 3, 1922. By 1928, after a dispute with neighboring ranchers and politically powerful Lincoln Loy McCandless, he was forced to sell Kahuā to Ronald von Holt and Atherton Richards, whose families still own it and offer historic tours. In 1928, he married Princess Elizabeth Kahanu, the widow of Prince Jonah Kūhiō Kalanianaʻole who had been delegate to US Congress from the Territory of Hawaii. He died in June 1930 and was buried in Oahu Cemetery. His second wife died in 1932 and was buried next to him.

== Family tree ==
Parker family tree

John Palmer Parker (1790–1868)	Kipikane (1800–1860)
John Palmer Parker II (1827–1891)	Ebenezer Parker (1829–1855)	Kilia Nahoalani (1834–1861)	Mary Ann Kaulalani (1819–1859)
Mary Parker Woods (1851–1909)	Harriet Panana Napela (1852–1901)	Samuel Parker (1853–1920)	Abigail Campbell (1858–1908)	Others
James Frank Woods (1872–1930)	Eva K. Parker (1874–1922)	John Palmer Parker III (1875–1894)	Elizabeth Jane Lanakila Dowsett (1872–1943)	Others
Others	Henry Gaillard Smart	Thelma Parker (1894–1914)
Richard Smart (1913–1992)	Patricia Havens-Monteagle (1913-1982)
Antony Parker Smart (1937-2007)	Gilliard "Gil" Smart (1940-1999)
