= Waimea Cherry Blossom Heritage Festival =

Coordinates: 20°1′13″N 155°40′4″W

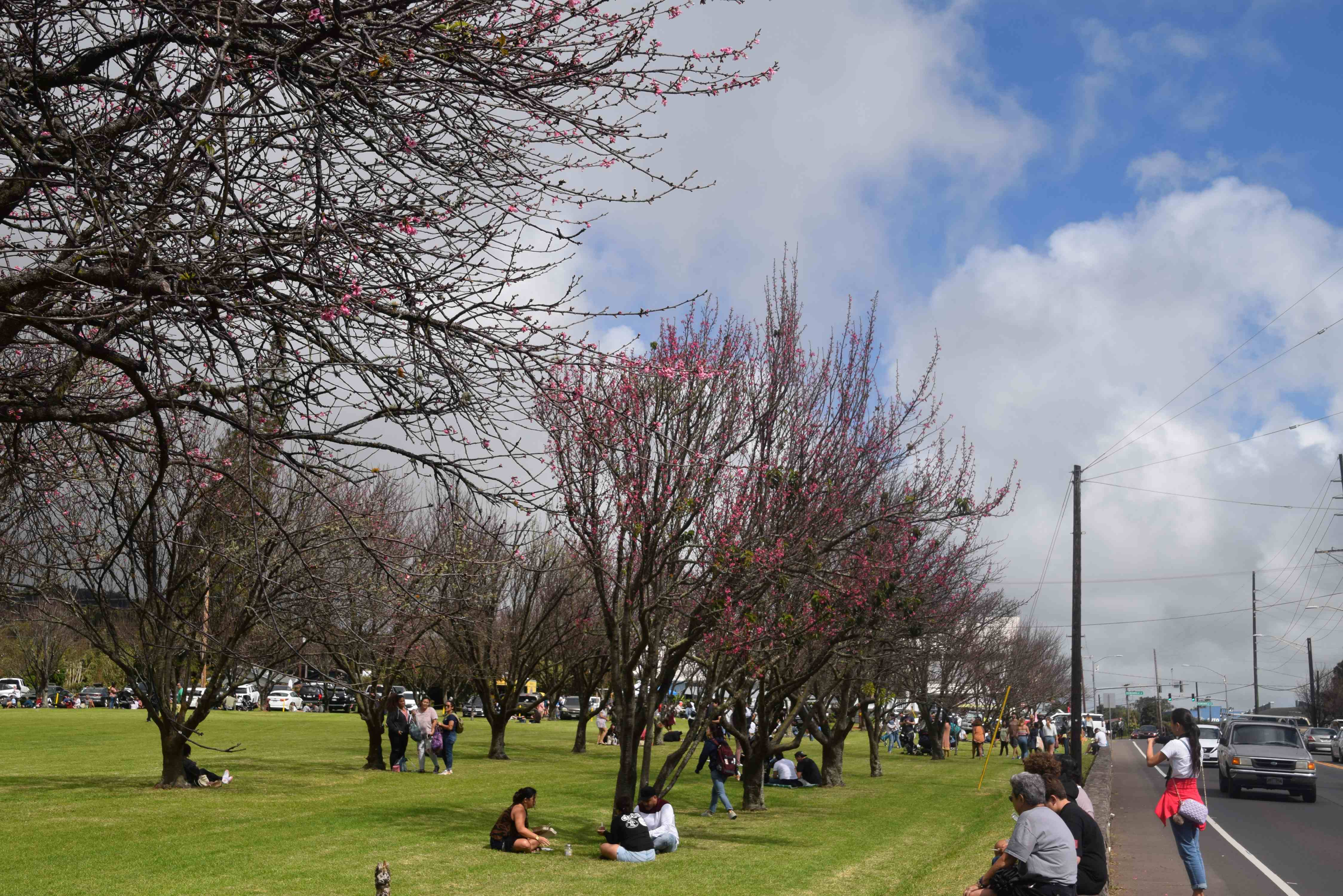
The Waimea Cherry Blossom Heritage Festival at Church Row Park in Waimea

The Waimea Cherry Blossom Heritage Festival is held each year in Waimea, Hawaii County, Hawaii, United States.

== Overview ==
The Waimea Cherry Blossom Festival is held on the first Saturday of February every year at Church Row Park, in the center of town on Hawaii State Route 19, and in Parker Ranch nearby.

In addition to cherry blossom viewing, there are hula, Hawaiian music, local food stalls, and other exhibits and presentations on traditional Japanese culture, such as mochi pounding, origami classes, and bonsai.

These cherry trees were brought from Okinawa by Nakanose of the Waipio Valley and were taken care of by Terao of Waimea in the early 1950s. The first festival was held in 1993 by the initiation of James Tohara with the help of George Yoshida, Director of the Department of Parks & Recreation.

Because Waimea is located in a highland area with strong seasonal winds from the east, the branches of the cherry and other trees are blown to the west. In February 2023, the 30th festival was held, after three years of cancellation due to the coronavirus pandemic.

== Gallery ==
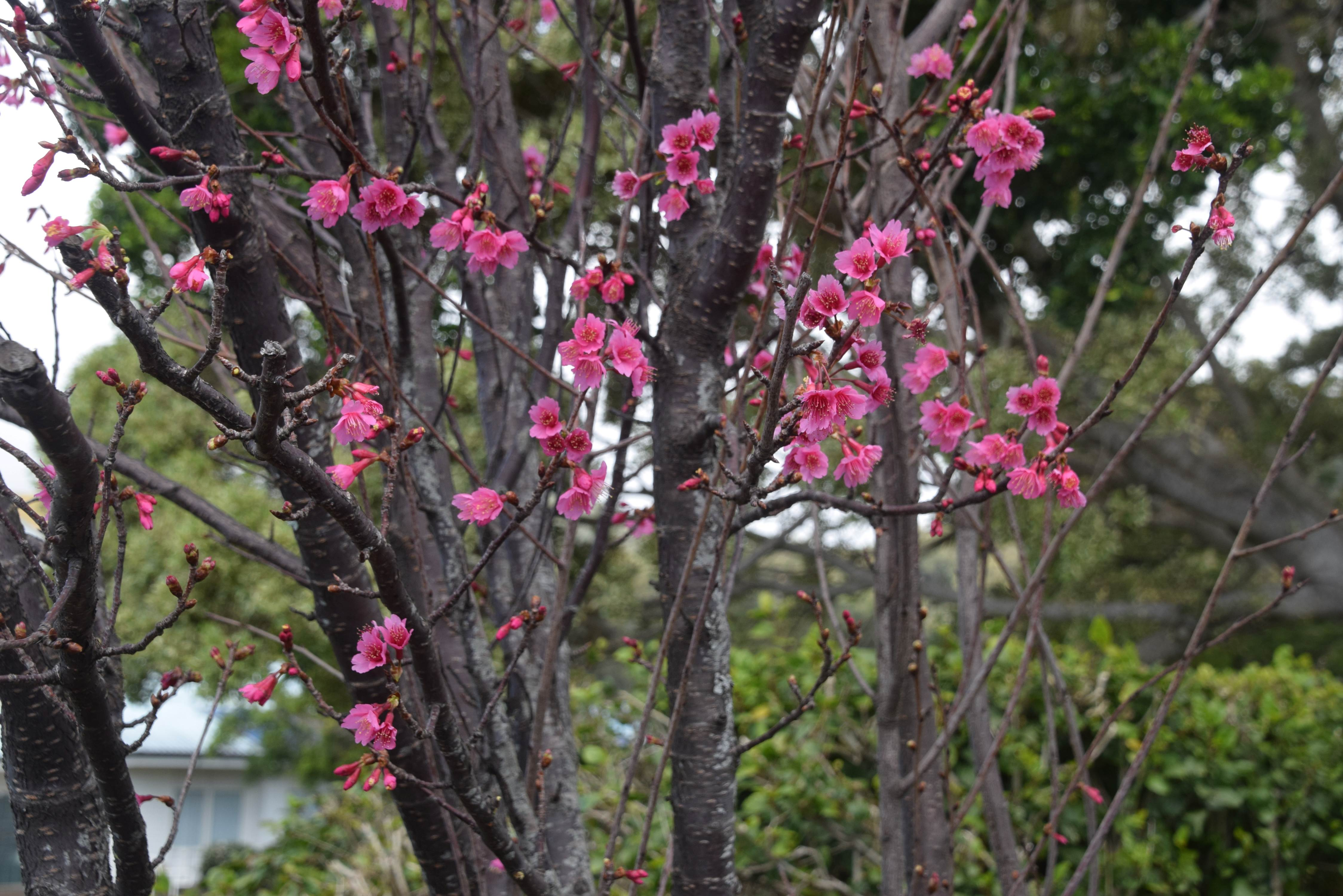
Kanhi cherry trees in full bloom

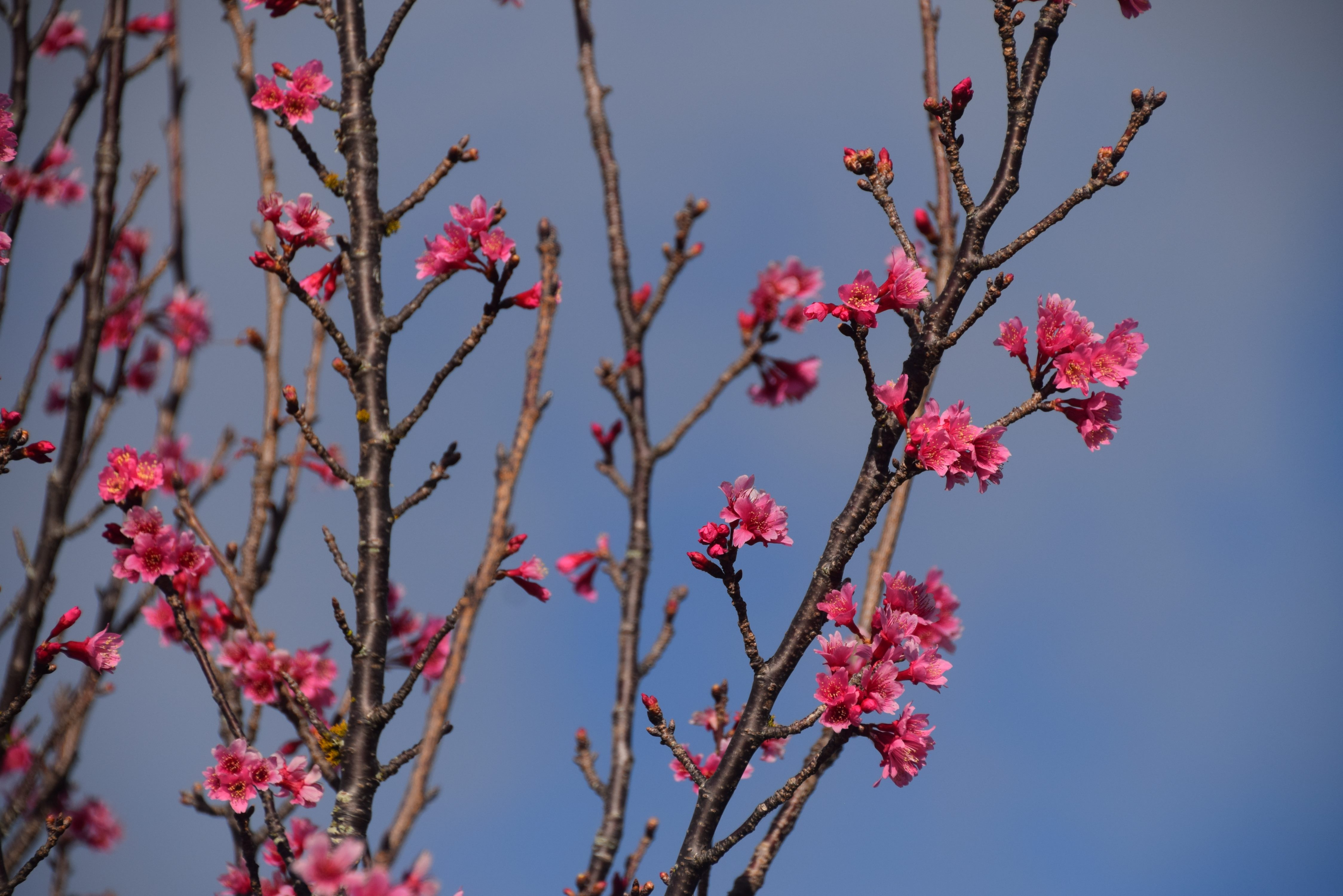
Kanhi cherry trees in full bloom

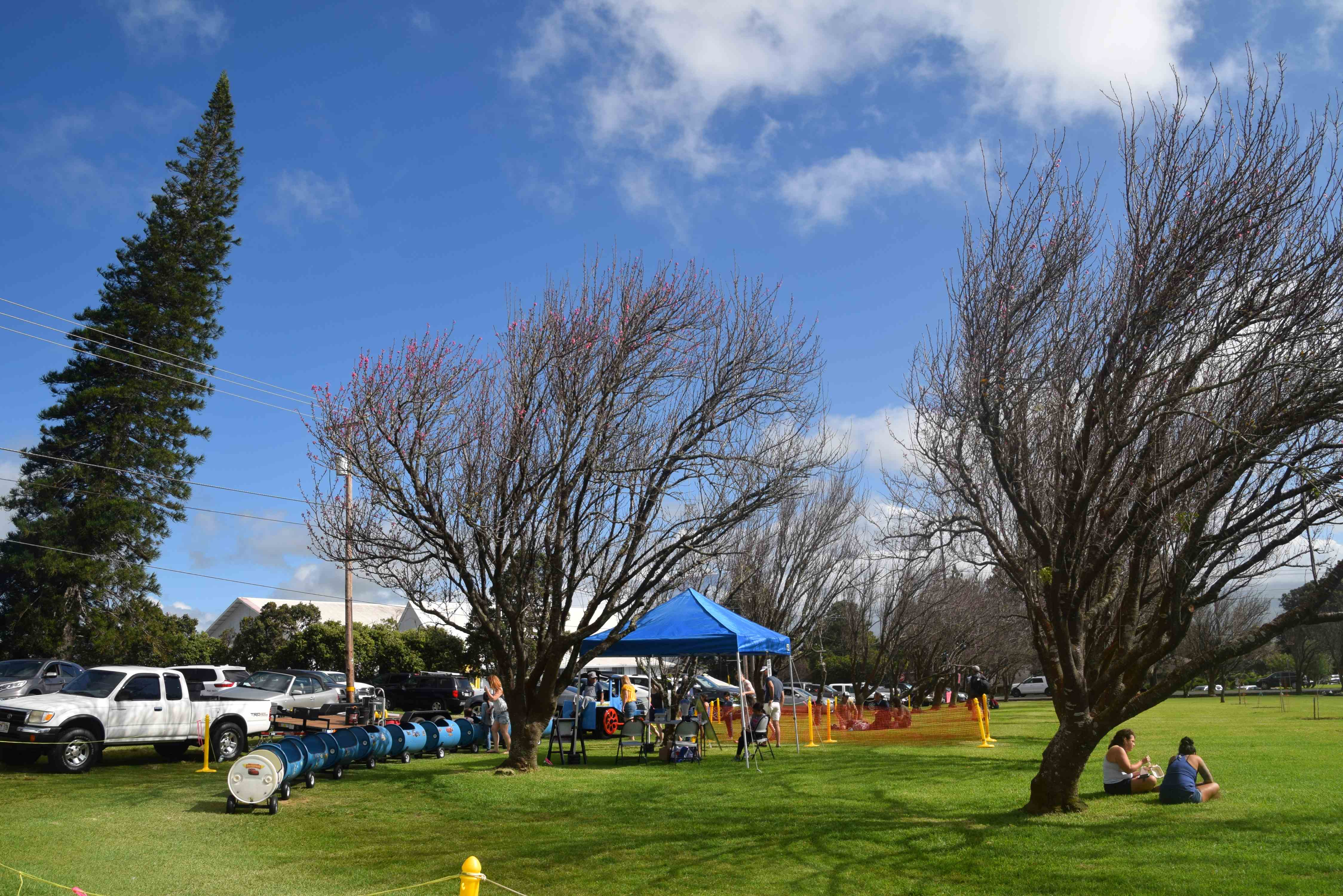
The cherry and other trees are blown to the west because of strong east wind

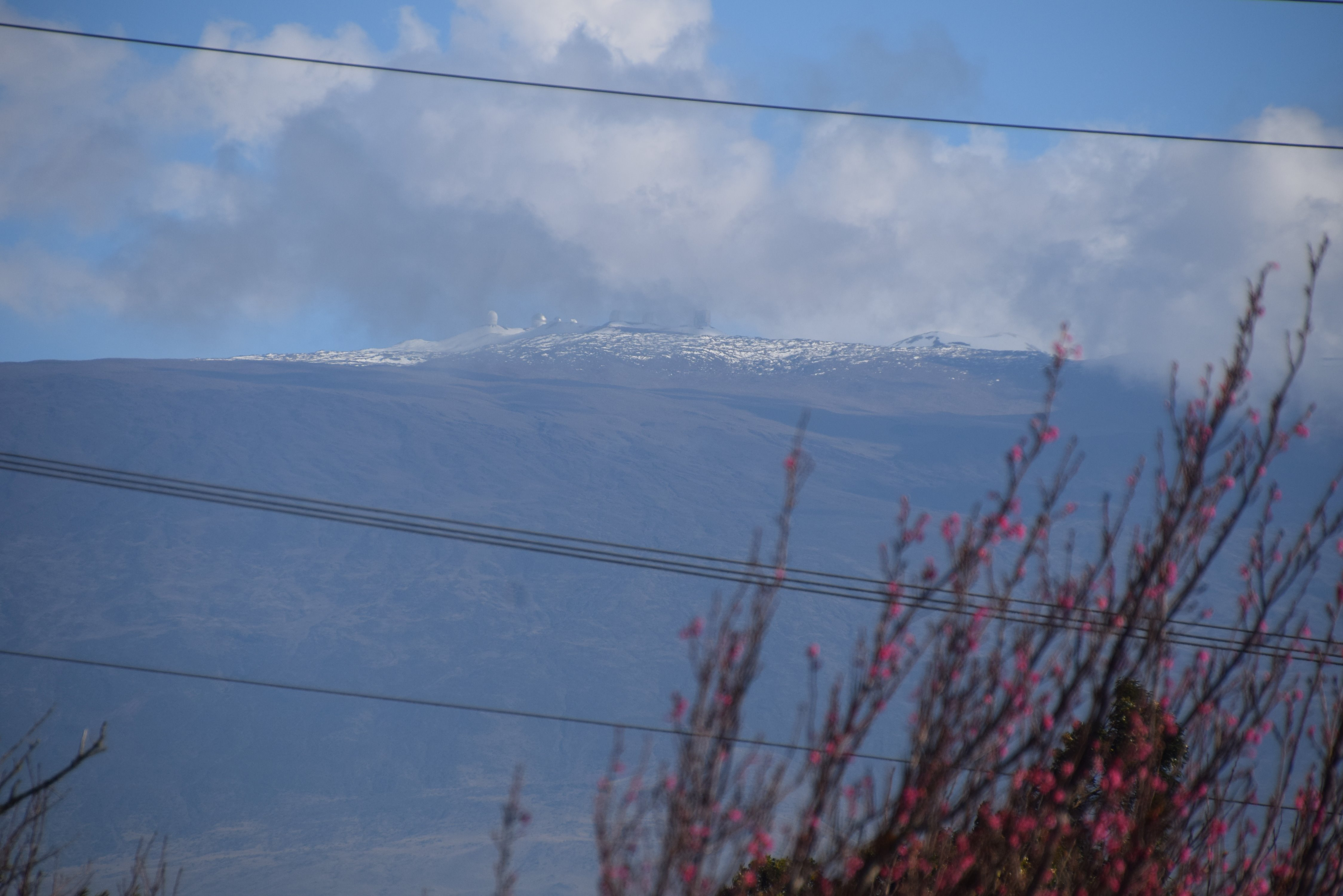
With Mauna Kea with snow in February

== See also ==
- Mauna Kea
- W. M. Keck Observatory headquarters nearby
