= Jovan Crnić =

Serbian basketball player

No. 0 – Egaleo bc
- Position: Small forward / shooting guard
- League: National league 1

Personal information
- Born: November 29, 1994 (age 31) Niš, FR Yugoslavia
- Listed height: 1.96 m (6 ft 5 in)
- Listed weight: 100 kg (220 lb)

Career information
- High school: Hawaii Preparatory Academy (Waimea, Hawaii)
- College: Northern Oklahoma (2013–2015); Abilene Christian (2015–2017)
- NBA draft: 2017: undrafted
- Playing career: 2017–present

Career history
- 2017–2018: Tbilisi
- 2017–2018: Žilina
- 2018–2019: Sloboda
- 2019–2020: Andrézieux ALS Basket
- 2020–2021: Kumanovo
- 2021–present: Sloboda Tuzla

Jovan Crnić (Serbian Cyrillic: Јован Црнић; born November 29, 1994) is a Serbian professional basketball player who plays for Sloboda Tuzla of the Basketball Championship of Bosnia and Herzegovina.

== High school & College ==
From 2011 to 2013, he attended a boarding school, Hawaii Preparatory Academy in Waimea. From 2013 to 2015, he played for Northern Oklahoma College, and in 2015 he transferred to Abilene Christian University, where he graduated in 2017.

== Professional career ==
He started his professional career in 2017, and played for Tbilisi, Žilina, Sloboda and Andrezieux ALS Basket. In 2020, he joined Kumanovo of the Macedonian First League.

In 2021, he signed for Sloboda Tuzla of the Basketball Championship of Bosnia and Herzegovina.
