= Samuel Parker (Hawaii politician) =

Hawaiian landowner and businessman (1853–1920)

The Honourable Samuel Parker
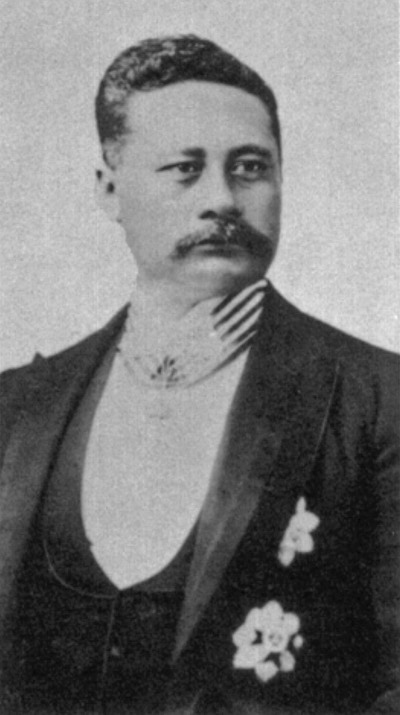

Minister of Foreign Affairs
- In office February 1891 – November 1892
- Monarch: Liliʻuokalani
- Preceded by: John A. Cummins
- Succeeded by: Joseph Nawahi
- In office January 13, 1893 – January 17, 1893
- Preceded by: Mark P. Robinson

Minister of Finance
- In office March 1891 – July 1891
- Preceded by: Hermann A. Widemann
- Succeeded by: John Mott-Smith
- In office October 1891 – January 1892
- Preceded by: John Mott-Smith
- Succeeded by: Hermann A. Widemann

Personal details
- Born: June 23, 1853 Waimea, Hawaii, Kingdom of Hawaii
- Died: March 19, 1920 (aged 66) Territory of Hawaii, United States
- Resting place: Parker family cemetery, near Hale Mana
- Spouse(s): Harriet Panana Napela; Abigail Kuaihelani Maipinepine
- Children: 9
- Occupation: Rancher, Businessman, Politician

Samuel Parker, known as Kamuela Parker (June 23, 1853 – March 19, 1920) was a major landowner and businessman on the island of Hawaii, heir to the Parker Ranch estate. He was also a leading political figure at a critical time of the history of the Kingdom of Hawaii, serving in its last cabinet.

== Background and early life ==
Samuel Parker was born on June 23, 1853. His paternal grandfather, John Palmer Parker (1790–1868), was a member of the eponymous Parker House Hotel family. John Parker was born in Boston, Massachusetts, but settled in the Hawaiian Islands. He founded the Hawaiian branch of the family when he married Chiefess Kipikane (1800–1860), who was related to the high-ranking chiefs of the Big Island. John's younger son, and Samuel's father, was Ebenezer Parker (1829–1855). Ebenezer Parker also married a Hawaiian woman, Kilia Nahulanui, on June 7, 1849. Despite his American-sounding name and upbringing, Samuel Parker was of three-quarters native Hawaiian ancestry.

Samuel Parker's life was influenced by some early deaths in the family. His father Ebenezer had died in 1855, when Samuel was only two years old. Samuel was the second son but his only brother, Ebenezer Christian Parker II, then died in 1860, at the age of ten. Samuel was educated at Oahu College, now known as Punahou School, on Oʻahu. There he made lasting friendships with his contemporaries among the Hawaiian nobility, a social connection that would prove very helpful in adulthood.

Grandfather John Parker died, in 1868, when Samuel was still only 15 years old. Samuel thus found himself the co-proprietor, with his father's elder brother, of the eponymous Parker Ranch.

The uncle was John Palmer Parker II (1827–1891), who was also married to a Hawaiian lady, Hanai. In 1879, they moved from the Ranch to a much larger and more accessible estate, more suited to their status as a wealthy and prominent couple who liked to entertain: Puʻu o Pelu. This left the Ranch house to Samuel and growing, new family.

The Parker Ranch began in 1847, with a small cottage called Mana Hale, in the remote uplands of Mauna Kea on Hawaiʻi island, at about 3,500 feet (1,100 m) elevation at 19°59′48″N 155°33′29″W, but was quickly built up into a profitable cattle-estate of 1 640 acres. However, when Samuel took over, he also left the cowboy work, and later the management, to others and was soon looking for further business opportunities.

== Family life ==
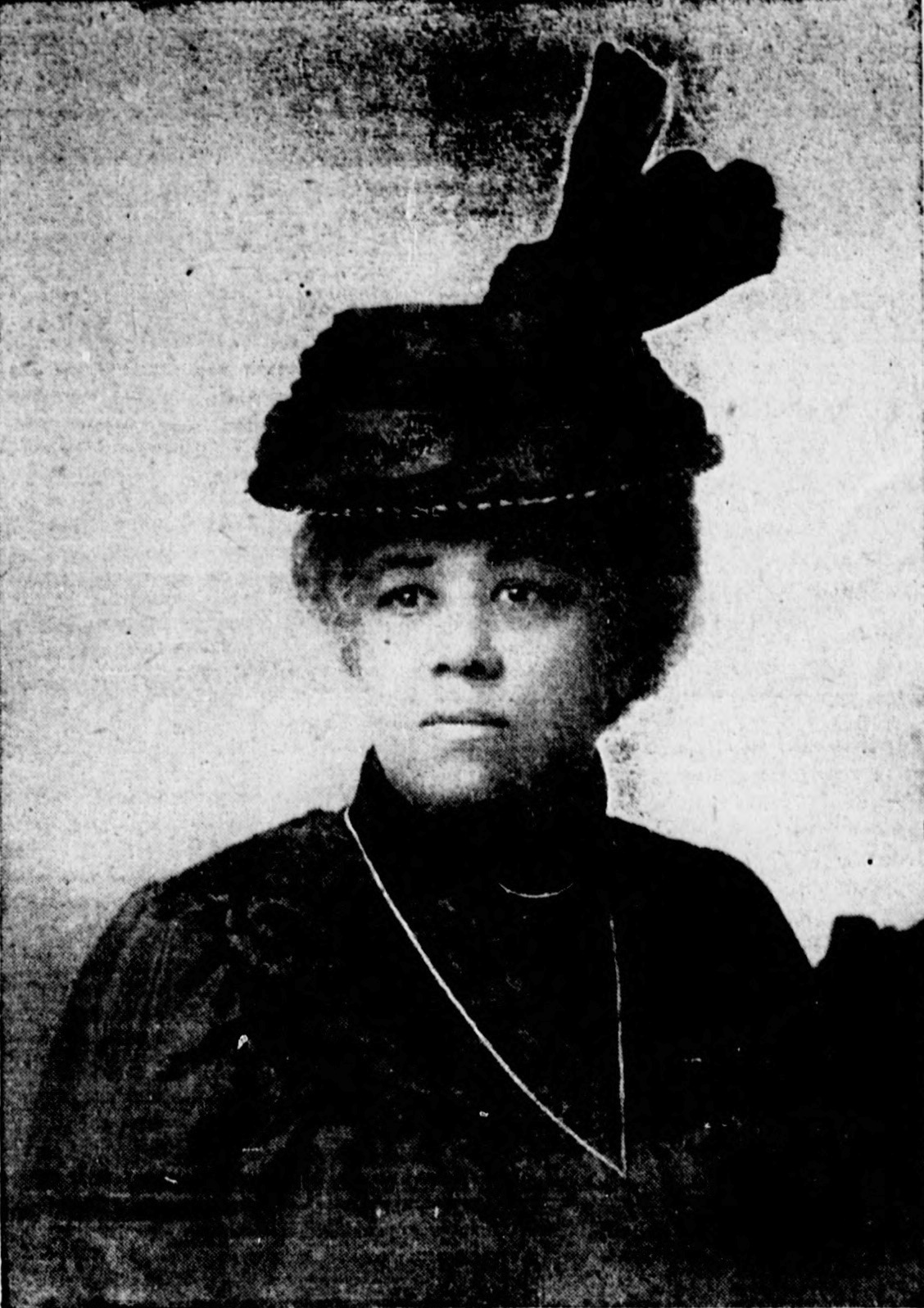
Hattie Panana Parker

Samuel married Harriet ("Hattie") Panana Kaiwaokalani Napela (1852–1901) on August 23, 1871. She was the daughter of Jonathan Napela who was an early convert to Mormonism, She was also three-quarters Hawaiian, and also known as Harriet Richardson, after her mother's maiden name.

Samuel and Harriet Parker had nine children. Their first daughter was Mary Kihilani Parker (1871–1895). The second daughter, Eva Kalanikauleleiaiwi Parker (1872–1922), married her cousin James Frank Woods, the son of Parker's sister Mary. The third daughter, Helen Umiokalani Parker (1874–1929), married Carl Widemann, son of Hermann Widemann.

Samuel's fourth child, John Palmer Parker III (1875–1893), was adopted by John Palmer Parker II and married Elizabeth Jane Lanakila Dowsett, known to later generations as "Aunt Tootsie", on April 18, 1893, at the Parker home in Honolulu. They had one daughter Annie Thelma Kahiluonapuaopiilani Parker March 17, 1894, who generally known by her second name, as Thelma; John III died less than two months later, on May 8, 1894. Thelma married Henry Gaillard Smart July 25, 1912 in Honolulu. and had one son Richard Palmer Smart, born on May 21, 1913. However, she also died soon afterwards, in 1914, aged only 20.

Other children were: Harriet "Hattie" Kaonohilani Parker (1876–1884), Palmer Kuihelani Parker (1878–1896), Samuel Keaoulilani Parker (1879–1934), Ernest Napela Parker (1884–1945) and James Kekoalii Parker (1886–1962).

Parker's uncle, John Palmer Parker II, died in November 1891.

Parker's wife, Harriet, died in 1901, but he did not remain a widower for long.

== Sugar-plantations ==
The family business was the Parker Ranch, a huge and successful cattle-business in the interior. However, in the second half of the century, the sugar-industry was developing rapidly in Hawaii, and Parker saw a profitable business opportunity and a chance to diversify from reliance on livestock.

In 1878, he started the Paʻauhau Plantation with Rufus Anderson Lyman, about 50 miles north of Hilo at coordinates 20°5′9″N 155°26′6″W. Lyman was advisor to island governor, Princess Ruth Keʻelikōlani, the only land owner with holdings greater than those of the Parker Ranch. Her lands later became a major part of the Kamehameha Schools estate.

Parker enjoyed being at the heart of Hawaiian business and social life, and developing a new and powerful circle of friends and associates. He was often involved in real estate deals involving long-term leases from the Kamehameha estate, or buying them fee simple, and also enjoyed the Hawaiian tradition of lavish entertaining at his estates.

On August 19, 1879, Parker invested in the nearby Pacific Sugar Mill in Kukuihaele near Waipiʻo Valley. The Pacific mill had an abundant water supply, but eventually failed from mismanagement. In 1883 manager William H. Purvis introduced the mongoose, which became an invasive pest. Herds of cattle and sheep had to be destroyed later when a glanders epidemic broke out because of poor conditions in the stables. Parker was becoming involved in too many projects to concentrate on addressing any particular problems that developed in his growing personal and professional empire.

== Politics ==
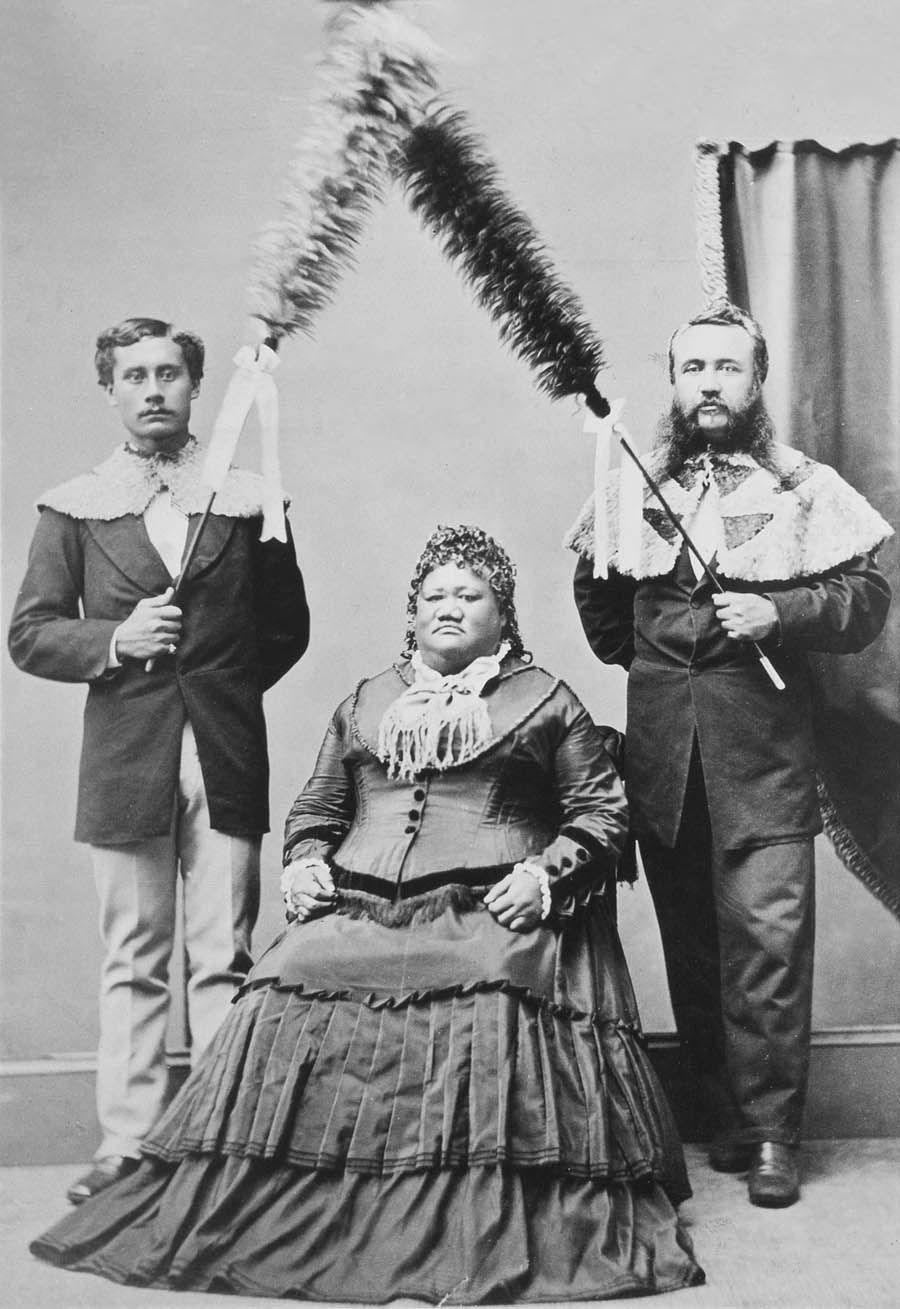
Left, with Princess Ruth Keʻelikōlani and John A. Cummins (right) about 1875

Royal household

In 1883, Parker took his first public role when he became a member of the Privy Council of King Kalākaua. In November 1884, he traveled abroad on official business, with the commission to the World Cotton Centennial in New Orleans, Louisiana. In 1886, he was appointed to the office of royal Equerry, which supplied horses and arranged ceremonial occasions, and to the personal staff of Kalākaua with honorary rank of Major and Equerry in Waiting. Later, he was often addressed as Colonel, but this was also merely a courtesy and there is no record of his ever serving as a regular soldier. He was appointed to the House of Nobles in the legislature from 1886 to 1890.

In the meanwhile, the ranch had been mortgaged to finance the failed sugar business, and was taken over by trustees and managed by Paul Jarrett in 1888.

Minister of State

In early 1891 Kalākaua died, and Queen Liliʻuokalani became the new ruler. On February 25, 1891, Parker was appointed to his first cabinet post, Minister of Foreign Affairs, when John Adams Cummins was told to resign by the queen. On March 3 Parker was appointed to the Commission of Crown Lands. He was generally considered the most powerful member of the cabinet; sometimes called Prime Minister, or Premier, but there was no such official office. The choice of Parker satisfied the people who wanted more native Hawaiians in the government, and he generally had favorable relations with the American interests at the time.

The first sign of trouble came a week later when Parker also became acting Minister of Finance, temporarily replacing Hermann A. Widemann who was also serving on the Supreme Court. The McKinley Tariff act had devastated the Hawaiian economy by making exports to the US much more expensive, undoing the effects of the Reciprocity Treaty of 1875. It was not until July that former self-taught dentist John Mott-Smith would take over the Finance position, which he had taken earlier under Kamehameha V. However, by October Mott-Smith was sent to Washington, DC to negotiate a trade treaty, and Parker had to again take the Finance position until Widemann could resume his duties on January 28, 1892.

Political unrest

A time of unprecedented instability in the government began in 1892, with the previously biennial part-time legislature having its longest session. Power was split among three parties, with only one of them, the Hawaiian National Reform Party, considered loyal to the queen. By early 1892, Marshal Charles Burnett Wilson suspected members of the Hawaiian National Liberal Party were planning a takeover of the government in response to the 1887 Bayonet Constitution which essentially limited voting rights to wealthy non-indigenous Hawaiians of American or European descent. These efforts were blocked by the Reform Party, which largely represented wealthy descendants of Americans and Europeans. Parker was attacked by the Liberals and called a "half-caste cowboy". By May some of the Liberals were arrested, but most charges were dropped, with Parker agreeing that prosecutions would just inflame tensions further.

Reports began circulating that Hawaii was negotiating to be annexed by the United States, but Parker issued denials. In reality, Lorrin A. Thurston (a newspaper publisher whose only government position was as a legislator) had been in Washington lobbying for annexation, but Mott-Smith did nothing to communicate this to Parker. Attorney General Whiting resigned because of a disagreement with Parker. Liliʻuokalani made a deal with the cabinet: if they supported a lottery to help raise funds, she would appoint Paul Neumann as the new attorney general, who agreed to keep Wilson as marshal. On August 30, 1892, the legislature passed a no confidence motion, insisting the Marshal Wilson be removed. Parker and the rest of the cabinet resigned, but Liliʻuokalani could not come up with replacements that would be acceptable to her opponents in the legislature. In November 1892 Parker was forced to resign, and was replaced with Joseph Nawahi.

Parker was again appointed to head the government on January 13, 1893, as Minister of Foreign Affairs; it was to be the last cabinet appointed by a ruling monarch. The next day Liliʻuokalani presented her proposed 1893 Constitution of the Kingdom of Hawaii to the cabinet. Frustrated by their hesitation, she threatened to proclaim it unilaterally. Parker and the other ministers were also warned by Thurston and other prominent citizens not to approve the new constitution, which they saw as returning to a more powerful autocratic rule. Parker met with both Liberals who demanded wider voting rights, and the American minister John L. Stevens, who said he would not support the queen if there was an uprising.

On January 16, troops from the USS Boston came ashore, armed but ordered to be as neutral as possible. Parker protested, and asked Stevens to order them to leave, but was told they were protecting American interests. The next day the Provisional Government of Hawaii declared the queen deposed. Parker protested to Stevens one more time, but by the time a response was delivered to Parker, the government building had been seized. Only a small police force led by Charles Burnett Wilson was protecting Liliʻuokalani, so Parker helped negotiate a surrender of to avoid bloodshed.

From San Francisco Parker tried to convince the US to restore the Queen, but the efforts were not successful. He was interviewed by US Commissioner James H. Blount in preparing his Blount Report on April 6, 1893. He stated his opinion that a majority of voters would have approved a restoration of the queen.

== Territorial life ==
Parker supported Sanford Dole as the first governor of the Territory of Hawaii, even though he had some encouragement to seek that post himself. In 1900 Parker attended the organizing convention of the Republican Party of Hawaii, and was chosen to attend the national convention in Philadelphia on June 19. In September Parker was nominated without opposition by the Republicans for the first election of delegate to US Congress for the territory. Prince David Kawānanakoa ran as a Democrat; they both lost. Parker came in a close second to Robert W. Wilcox of the Home Rule Party of Hawaii.

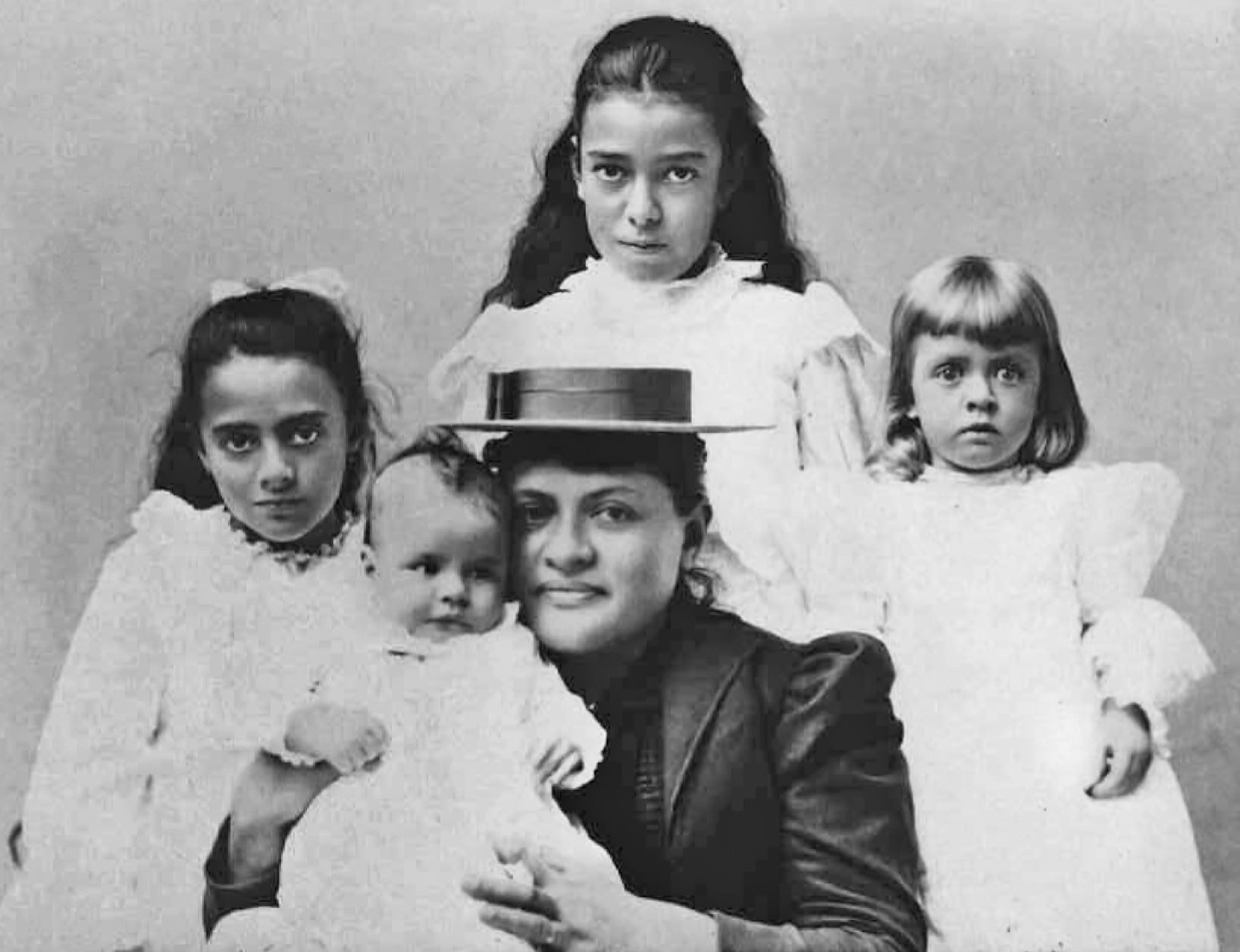
Parker's second wife and stepchildren

It is at this time that most townsfolk believe that the Postal Office in Waimea was renamed Kamuela in honor of Parker. This was to avoid confusion with the larger community of Waimea, Kauaʻi. This claim is supported by documentation within the records of the US Board of Geographic Names.

Parker's first wife died in July 1901. His second wife was Abigail Kuaihelani Maipinepine (1859–1908), widow of industrialist James Campbell. They married January 3, 1902 at the Occidental Hotel in San Francisco, with judge J. C. B. Hebbard officiating. This made him stepfather to Abigail Campbell and his second wife's other daughters. Parker had acquired a reputation as a notorious spendthrift. Even his supporters said:

The titled and the wealthy of all lands who have visited the islands know Parker and have partaken of his hospitality. Few men have bet more money at poker on small hands than has Colonel "Sam" Parker.

Three days later, his stepdaughter Abigail married Prince Kawānanakoa, who had been his opponent in the 1900 election. This family and its descendants became known as the House of Kawānanakoa.

As part of their honeymoon, in early 1902 the Parkers traveled to Washington, DC, where he visited Theodore Roosevelt. They returned to California February 2, 1902; it was rumored that Parker would be appointed as the next governor of the Territory of Hawaii. However, George R. Carter was appointed instead, descended from American missionaries. It would not be until John D. Waihee III in 1986 that an ethnic native Hawaiian would become governor. Parker's wife was a target of a jewel theft when they returned in 1903.

Although Parker stayed active in the Republican party, he was never elected or appointed to a territorial office. He was able to convince Prince Jonah Kūhiō Kalanianaʻole, brother of his stepson-in-law Kawānanakoa, to run as a Republican in the 1902 election of congressional delegate; Kalanianaʻole won, and was reelected until his death. Parker served as the first territorial representative on the Republican National Committee.

In 1904 he partnered with Kohala Plantation owner John Hind on the irrigation project known as the Kohala Ditch and hired Michael O'Shaughnessy to help engineer the project. He invested in the Hawaiian Irrigation Company of John T. McCrosson, originally called the Hamakua Ditch company, but changed to avoid confusion with the earlier project of a similar name on Maui by Henry Perrine Baldwin. It was intended to build another irrigation system for Parker's Paʻauhau Plantation. Although Parker arranged various leases for ranch land, these projects fell into turmoil over contractual disputes.

Parker was often at odds with Parker Ranch manager Alfred Wellington Carter (cousin of governor George Carter). Carter was steadily investing in enlarging the ranch, while Parker was more interested in using its profits to support his lifestyle. Carter was appointed guardian of Annie Thelma Parker, heir of her adoptive grandfather John Parker II's half interest in the ranch. Carter proposed mortgaging that half to buy out Parker. Parker claimed he rightfully owned the entire ranch and started a lawsuit to remove Carter as guardian and ranch manager. Annie Thelma Parker's mother, who had remarried to Frederick S. Knight of San Francisco in October 1900, publicly attacked Parker saying she "had personal knowledge of the extravagance of said Samuel Parker and of his inability to manage his own property affairs in a discreet and prudent manner". Although the court battles dragged on for years, eventually Parker accepted $600,000 and a few small parcels in exchange for his share in the ranch, finalized on September 20, 1906.

After his wife Abigail's death in 1908, the Campbell Estate, one of the largest private landholdings in Hawaii, was left in trust to her children from her first marriage. Parker spent more time in the US, including visiting his distant Boston relations. The press liked to call him the "King of Hawaii". His health started to fail, and he headed back to Hawaii in November 1913 on a new steamship of the Matson Navigation Company line.

Parker died March 19, 1920, after a heart illness. He and many family members are buried at the original Parker family cemetery near Hale Mana. The Parker Ranch, estimated worth about $6 million at the time, was left in trust to his six-year-old great-grandson Richard Smart. Parker's personal estate went to five surviving children. When Smart died in 1992 the ranch passed to a non-profit trust. Parker's nephew James Frank Woods (1872–1930), widower of daughter Eva, in 1923 married Elizabeth Kahanu Kalanianaʻole (1879–1932), who was the widow of Prince Jonah Kūhiō Kalanianaʻole.

== Family tree ==
Parker family tree

John Palmer Parker (1790–1868)	Kipikane (1800–1860)
John Palmer Parker II (1827–1891)	Ebenezer Parker (1829–1855)	Kilia Nahoalani (1834–1861)	Mary Ann Kaulalani (1819–1859)
Mary Parker Woods (1851–1909)	Harriet Panana Napela (1852–1901)	Samuel Parker (1853–1920)	Abigail Campbell (1858–1908)	Others
James Frank Woods (1872–1930)	Eva K. Parker (1874–1922)	John Palmer Parker III (1875–1894)	Elizabeth Jane Lanakila Dowsett (1872–1943)	Others
Others	Henry Gaillard Smart	Thelma Parker (1894–1914)
Richard Smart (1913–1992)	Patricia Havens-Monteagle (1913-1982)
Antony Parker Smart (1937-2007)	Gilliard "Gil" Smart (1940-1999)

Notes:

Government offices
Preceded by John A. Cummins	Kingdom of Hawaii Minister of Foreign Affairs; February 1891 – November 1892	Succeeded by Joseph Nawahi
Preceded by Hermann A. Widemann	Kingdom of Hawaii Minister of Finance; March 1891 – July 1891	Succeeded by John Mott-Smith
Preceded by John Mott-Smith	Kingdom of Hawaii Minister of Finance; October 1891 – January 1892	Succeeded by Hermann A. Widemann
Preceded by Mark P. Robinson	Kingdom of Hawaii Minister of Foreign Affairs; January 13, 1893 – January 17, 1893	Succeeded by Overthrow of the Kingdom of Hawaii
