= John Palmer Parker (rancher) =

American rancher in Hawaii (1790-1868)

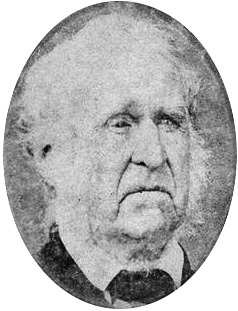
- Born: May 1, 1790; Newton, Massachusetts
- Died: August 20, 1868 (aged 78); Oʻahu, Kingdom of Hawaii
- Known for: Parker Ranch
- Spouse: Rachel Kipikane
- Children: 3
- Parent(s): Samuel Parker IV; Ann Palmer

John Palmer Parker (May 1, 1790 – August 20, 1868) was the founder of the Parker Ranch on the island of Hawaiʻi in Hawaii. In 2008, he was inducted into the Hall of Great Westerners of the National Cowboy & Western Heritage Museum.

== Life ==
John Palmer Parker was born May 1, 1790, in Newton, Massachusetts. His father was Samuel Parker (1742–1822) and mother was Ann Palmer Parker (1753–1841).

Parker arrived in Hawaii around 1809 by jumping off of a ship. John Parker came to the attention of King Kamehameha I, the chief who united the eight separate islands into the Kingdom of Hawaii, and was given important tasks by the king. John traveled to China during the War of 1812, returning to Hawaii in 1815. Having brought back with him a new, state-of-the-art American musket, Parker was given the privilege of being the first man paid to shoot some of the thousands of feral cattle that roamed Hawaii’s remote plains and valleys. These animals were the descendants of one bull and five cows given by British Captain George Vancouver to Kamehameha as a gift in 1793.

A year after he returned to Hawaii in 1815, he married Chiefess Kipikane (1800–1860), full name Keli'ikipikaneokaolohaka, the granddaughter of Kamehameha I and daughter of Kahiwa Kanekapolei. Kipikane took the Christian name Rachel. She bore John a daughter Mary Ann Kaulalani (1819–1859) and two sons Ebenezer (1829–1855) and John Palmer Kamaikaaloa Kalanioku (1827–1900). The Parker dynasty figured in the next two centuries of Hawaiian history. The family first settled at a small farm in the Kohala district. In 1835 he was hired by Honolulu merchant William French to start a commercial operation selling products of the wild cattle near the present town of Waimea. With his New England education, Parker became accountant of French's business and managed a store called Puʻuloa.

Beef from these cattle was salted and sold to whaling vessels. Live cattle were driven down to the harbor at Kawaihae and shipped to Honolulu. Meat, animal products, and hides were shipped to South America and the United States. Salted beef eventually replaced the increasingly scarce sandalwood as the island’s chief export. On January 8, 1847, Parker acquired some land in the remote uplands of Mauna Kea at about 3,500 feet (1,100 m) elevation at 19°59′48″N 155°33′29″W called Mānā. Mānā means "arid" in the Hawaiian language.

The first Parker homestead was a small cottage called Hale Mānā ('Dry House') at this site. After the Great Mahele allowed private land ownership, he purchased 640 acres (2.6 km^{2}) around Mānā in 1850 and another thousand acres in 1851. More land was leased from King Kamehameha III, and the ranch continued to grow. Over time Parker switched from hunting wild animals to domesticating and raising them in fenced paddocks.

His son John Palmer II married Hawaiian Hanai on October 6, 1845, and then after her death, Leiakaula on January 3, 1865. Ebenezer married Kilia June 7, 1849.

Parker also developed orchards and a dairy operation. Despite the death of his son Ebenezer in 1855 and a drought in 1856, he added yet more land in the area known as Paʻauhau by 1861. After his first wife Kipikane died, he married another Hawaiian woman named Leiakaula. His health began to fail in 1867. Parker died August 20, 1868, on Oʻahu and was buried back at the family cemetery near Hale Mānā. He was inducted into the Hall of Great Westerners at the National Cowboy & Western Heritage Museum in 2008. The ranch would be inherited by John Palmer II and Ebenezer's son Samuel Parker (only 15 years old at the time). John Palmer II took over operation of the ranch, although he was appointed to the upper House of Nobles in the legislature of the Hawaiian Kingdom in 1873. Grandson Samuel became more active in politics, so after John II's death Alfred Wellington Carter became ranch manager.

== Family tree ==
Parker family tree

John Palmer Parker (1790–1868)	Kipikane (1800–1860)
John Palmer Parker II (1827–1891)	Ebenezer Parker (1829–1855)	Kilia Nahoalani (1834–1861)	Mary Ann Kaulalani (1819–1859)
Mary Parker Woods (1851–1909)	Harriet Panana Napela (1852–1901)	Samuel Parker (1853–1920)	Abigail Campbell (1858–1908)	Others
James Frank Woods (1872–1930)	Eva K. Parker (1874–1922)	John Palmer Parker III (1875–1894)	Elizabeth Jane Lanakila Dowsett (1872–1943)	Others
Others	Henry Gaillard Smart	Thelma Parker (1894–1914)
Richard Smart (1913–1992)	Patricia Havens-Monteagle (1913-1982)
Antony Parker Smart (1937-2007)	Gilliard "Gil" Smart (1940-1999)
