= Parker School (Kamuela, Hawaii) =

Location
- Waimea, Hawaii; United States; 20°01′20″N 155°40′12″W

Information
- Type: Private, coeducational
- Founded: 1976; 50 years ago
- Headmaster: Stephen Dunn
- Grades: K-12
- Enrollment: 342
- Average class size: 14
- Student to teacher ratio: 1:8
- Campus size: 20 acres
- Colors: Maroon and White
- Mascot: Bulls
- Rival: Hawaii Preparatory Academy (HPA)
- Website: www.parkerschoolhawaii.org

Parker School is an independent, co-educational day school for students in grades K-12 located in Waimea, Hawaii County, Hawaii. The school offers a complete K-12 college-preparatory program in separate facilities for lower, middle and upper school students.

The school is fully accredited by the National Association of Independent Schools (NAIS) and the Western Association of Schools and Colleges (WASC), Parker School was established in 1976 by community leaders.

== History ==
Established in 1976 by several North Hawai'i community leaders, Parker School became an independent day school to serve the area's high school students. Initially, the school was opened to serve grades 9 through 12.

Middle school grades were added in 1977 and, in 2005, Parker School became a full curriculum school with the addition of kindergarten through 5th grade. In 2007, a new Lower School campus opened to house the newly expanded kindergarten thru 5th grades.

Parker School is located at 65-1224 Lindsey Road, in Waimea (post office Kamuela).

=== Timeline ===
1976	Parker School founded
1977	Middle school grades added
1978	Richard Smart, owner of Parker Ranch endows school
1995	Parker School purchases campus
2005	Parker School begins Lower School program
2007	New Lower School campus opens

=== Sports ===
Parker School is part of the BIIF (Big Island Interscholastic Federation), which is the Hawaiʻi island league, and the HHSAA (Hawaii High School Athletic Association), which hosts the Hawaii State Tournaments. Parker competes against all high schools on the island regardless of size. Parker offers co-ed cross country and girls' volleyball in the fall, co-ed soccer, basketball, and paddling in the winter, and boys' volleyball, co-ed tennis, and co-ed golf in the spring.

== Academics ==
Parker school has produced two Presidential Scholars, eight National Merit Semifinalists and numerous AP scholars.

=== Presidential Scholars ===
2013	Paul Gregg
2014	Lysha Matsunobu

=== National Merit Semifinalists ===
2008	Erica Warkus
2011	Edward Hon, Mary Kamitaki, Elliott Warkus
2012	Kieran Najita
2013	Paul Gregg, Aidan Wharton
2014	Lysha Matsunobu

The Parker Debate Team competes in the Hawaii Speech League and earned National Forensics League "100 Club" recognition in 2009. Parker won the State Championship in 2013, tied for victory in 2015 and has qualified several students to compete in the national championship.

=== National Debate Tournament Qualifiers ===
2012	Jesse Tarnas, Lincoln-Douglas Debate
2012	Tyler McCullough, Lincoln-Douglas Debate
2013	Paul Gregg, Lincoln-Douglas Debate
2014	Jaren Ashcraft and Luke Potter, Public Forum
2014	Carrie Hiller, Lincoln-Douglas Debate
2017	Kirk Hubbard and Susie Krall, Policy Debate
2017	Zoe Vann and Anna Gaglione, Policy Debate
2017	Hunter Kalahiki, Program Oral Interpretation
2024	Oscar Amos, Lincon-Douglas Debate
2025	Oscar Amos, Lincon-Douglas Debate
2025	Gibson Mcintosh and Liam Little, Duo Interpretation
2025	Dalia Lancos, Program Oral Interpretation
