= Chad Kroski =

Fictional character for German advertising

Chad Kroski is a fictional character. The fictional author, playwright, and singer was created in 2005 for a German commercial by T-Mobile for its web'n'walk service. Since the launch of the advert, many unofficial websites have popped up to propagate various stories about Kroski (see unofficial biography below), most of them differing from T-Mobile's official fictional biography, found on their in character homepage for the character.

Another product of the same advertising plot is the fictional band Soulmelon. It is not quite as popular in regard to urban mythology as Chad Kroski, but there are also in character websites about the band.

== Fictional biographies ==
=== Official biography ===
Charaijev Alexander Kroski (born April 13, 1974) is an American author, born in Lexington-Fayette, Kentucky. His novels include Girl Without Past (1996), Sardines And Tuna (1997), Expensive Rain (1997), Embers Of Salem (2002), Over And Done With (2003) and The Future Starts Now (2004). In 2004 he married Gretchen Woolrich.

=== Unofficial biography ===
Chad Kroski (born February 16, 1972, in Rustavi, Republic of Georgia) is an American novelist, playwright and singer. He is best known for his melancholic nihilism.

His parents emigrated to the United States in 1974, and settled in Austin, Texas, where his father was employed with a local oil company. He and his younger sister, Natasha, were brought up by his grandmother until they were allowed to enter the United States in 1978.

Kroski received his high school diploma from the Hawaii Preparatory Academy in 1990 and then, after taking a gap year to backpack through South America, he went on to attend Hunter College. He graduated with a BA in Anthropology from New York University (NYU) in 1995.

Kroski's career began in college in 1992, when he published a book of short stories entitled Lyrics from a Dead Man at Harper Press, which was critically acclaimed. In the following years, he engaged in various projects, including a collaboration with the band Interpol. When he met Interpol's Daniel Kessler at NYU, they agreed to work together on the band's lyrics. In 1997, a collaboration with Muse, an English band, began. He served as the band's lead tour manager from 2000 until 2003. At this time he began learning to play the jaw harp.

In 2002, Kroski published his major work, The Absolution of Evil, a gloomy, apocalyptic novel based on Dante's The Divine Comedy. The novel was on The New York Times Best Seller list for seven weeks.
