= Alfred Wellington Carter =

Lawyer and judge in Hawaii, managed the Parker Ranch

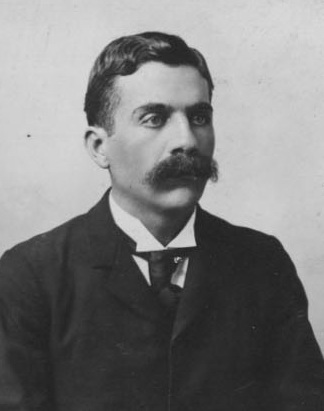
- On 1895 military commission
- Born: April 27, 1867; Honolulu
- Died: April 27, 1949 (aged 82)
- Occupations: Lawyer, Judge, Ranch manager
- Children: 4

Alfred Wellington Carter (April 27, 1867 – April 27, 1949) was a lawyer and judge in the Republic of Hawaii and the Territory of Hawaii who managed the Parker Ranch.

== Early life ==
His grandfather Joseph Oliver Carter (1802–1850) was a merchant ship captain. His father was Samuel Morrill Carter (1838–1893) and mother was Harriet Layman Hempstead (1836–1898). Alfred Wellington Carter was born April 22, 1862, and named for an uncle Alfred Wellington Carter (1841–1890). Another uncle Henry A. P. Carter (1837–1891) had been a cabinet minister and diplomat for the Kingdom of Hawaii. His uncle Joseph O. Carter was Liliʻuokalani's legal advisor and served on her Privy Council of State. Since many of his relatives were also named Alfred, he went by his initials "A. W."

== Career ==
Carter attended Punahou School and became an officer in the Honolulu Rifles militia in July 1887. By November 1889 he was promoted to lieutenant colonel. In 1893 he graduated cum laude with an LLB degree from Yale Law School. He returned to live in Waikiki and practice law with his older cousin Charles Lunt Carter. On January 6, 1895, he heard gunfire as the 1895 Counter-Revolution in Hawaii had been discovered nearby. The Carters and neighbor James Bicknell Castle took rifles to the scene of the shooting. Charles was hit by gunfire and died early the next morning.

== Parker Ranch ==
In 1899 Carter was appointed guardian of Annie Thelma Kahiluonapuaapiilani Parker, heir of half of the vast Parker Ranch founded by her great-grandfather John Palmer Parker (1790–1868). He moved to the island of Hawaiʻi and became manager of the ranch, although his wife stayed in Honolulu where the children attended school. Carter was often at odds with the other half-owner, Samuel Parker, who wanted to use income from the ranch to fund his lifestyle instead of expansion. Parker sued, claiming he owned the entire ranch, and tried to remove Carter as manager. The court case dragged on for years. Carter mortgaged the ranch and bought Parker out in 1906.

== Hawaii Meat Company ==
In 1909 he formed the Hawaii Meat Company as a cooperative with other ranchers (although Parker Ranch was majority owner). After Thelma died in 1914, Carter continued to advise her son Richard Smart (1913–1992) who was the new heir. In 1937 Carter's son Alfred Hartwell Carter became manager of the ranch. Carter died on April 27, 1949.

From 1900 to 1917 Carter was a trustee of Kamehameha Schools, the estate of Bernice Pauahi Bishop set up by Charles Reed Bishop, which was an even larger landowner than the Parker Ranch.

== Natural Area Reserves System Hawaii ==
Hapuna Beach State Recreation Area was originally named A. W. Carter Park for him, since he helped the territory acquire the land from the ranch. As a member of the territorial board of forestry from 1903 to 1907 and 1909 to 1912, he helped establish the Hawaii forest reserves while his cousin George R. Carter was governor. He was inducted into the Paniolo hall of fame in 2003.

== Family ==
On October 12, 1895, Carter married Edith Millicent Hartwell, daughter of American Civil War General and later Hawaii judge Alfred S. Hartwell (1836–1912). They had four children. Alfred Hartwell Carter was born December 1, 1896. Edith Millicent Carter was born February 17, 1898. Dorothy Layman Carter was born September 29, 1899. Barbara Juliette Carter was born June 25, 1901.

== See also ==
- Robert Lewers
