= Parker Ranch =

Working cattle ranch on the Island of Hawaii

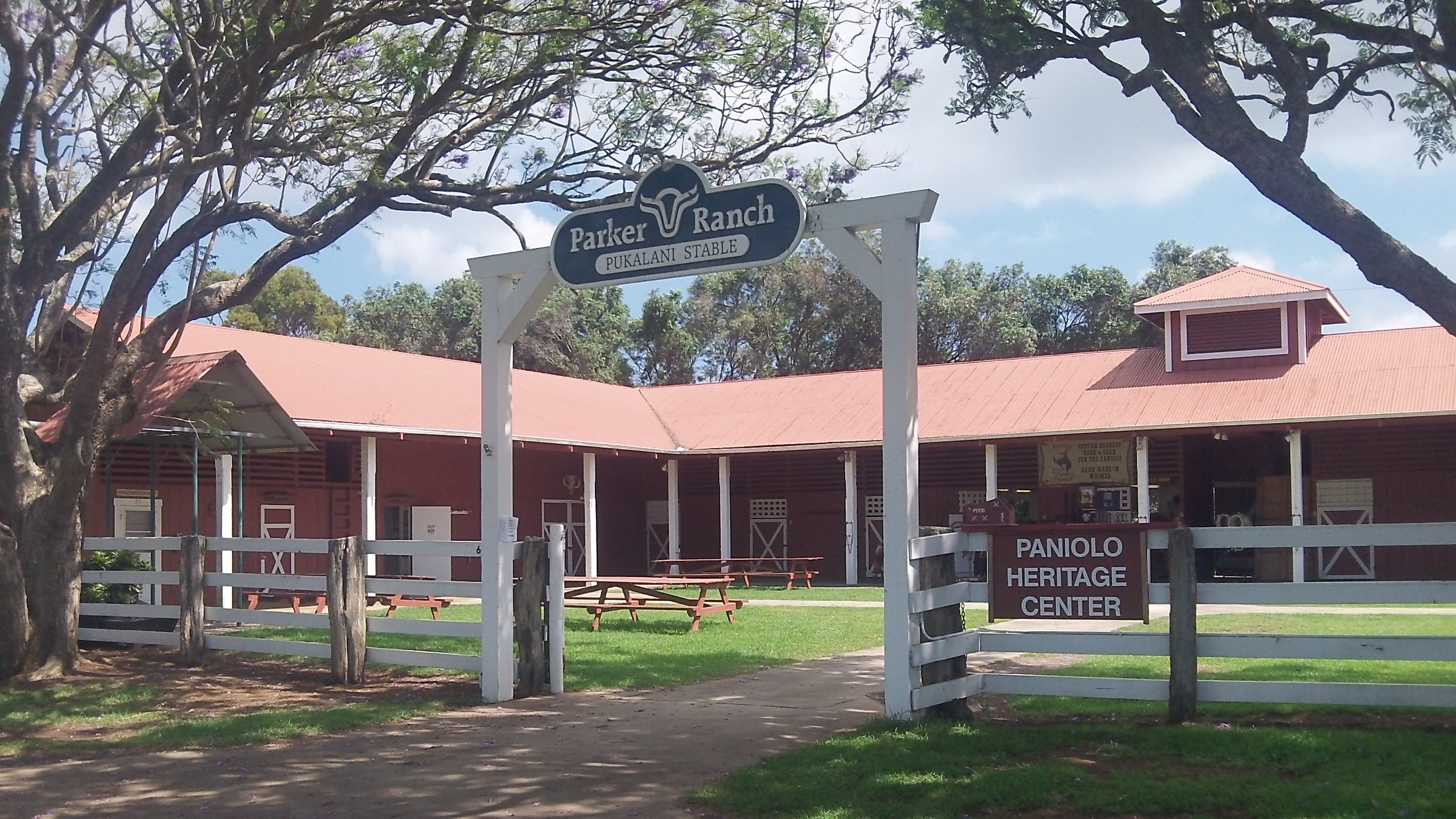
Paniolo Heritage Center at Pukalani Stables

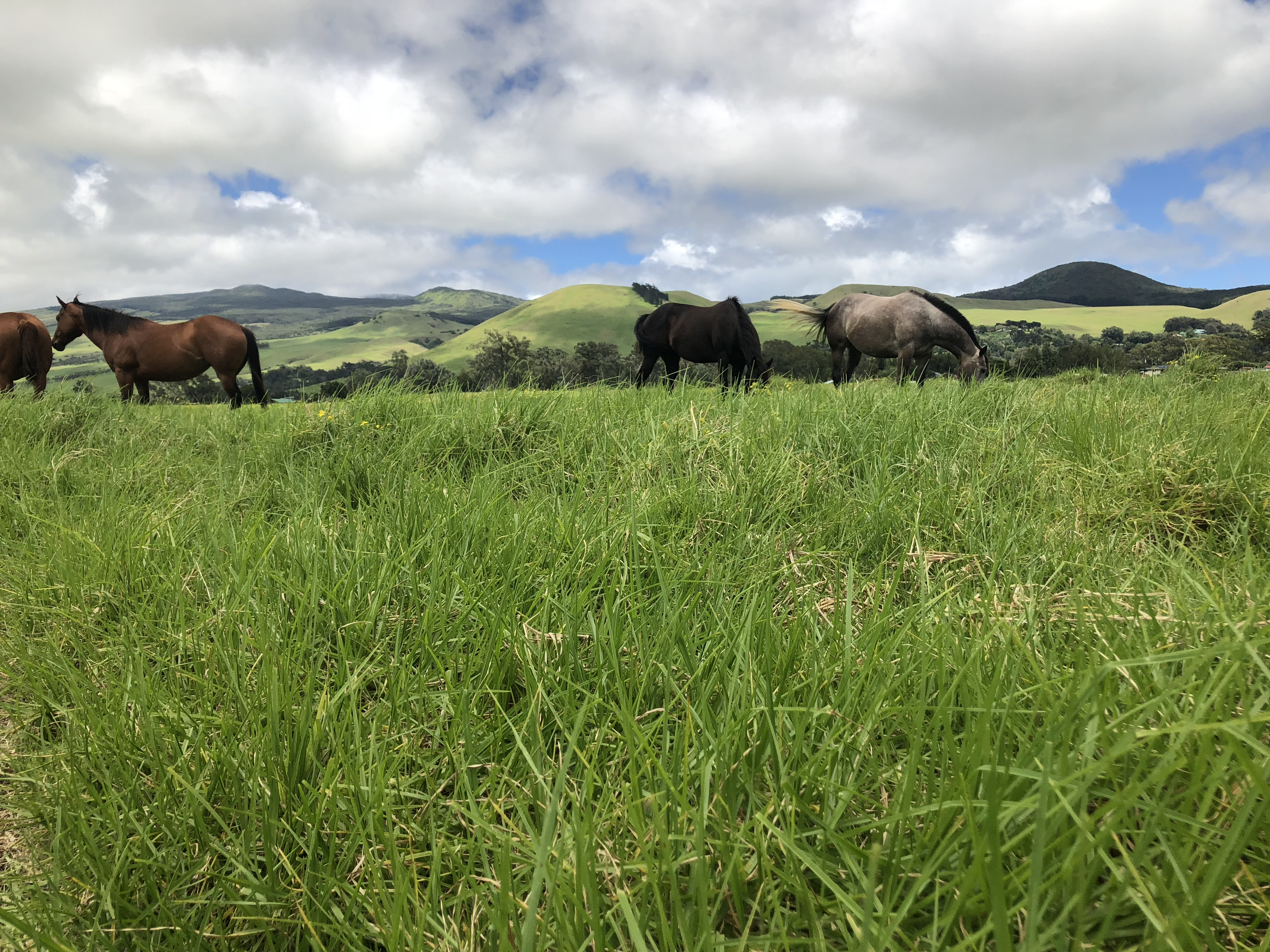
Horses at Puuopelu at Parker Ranch

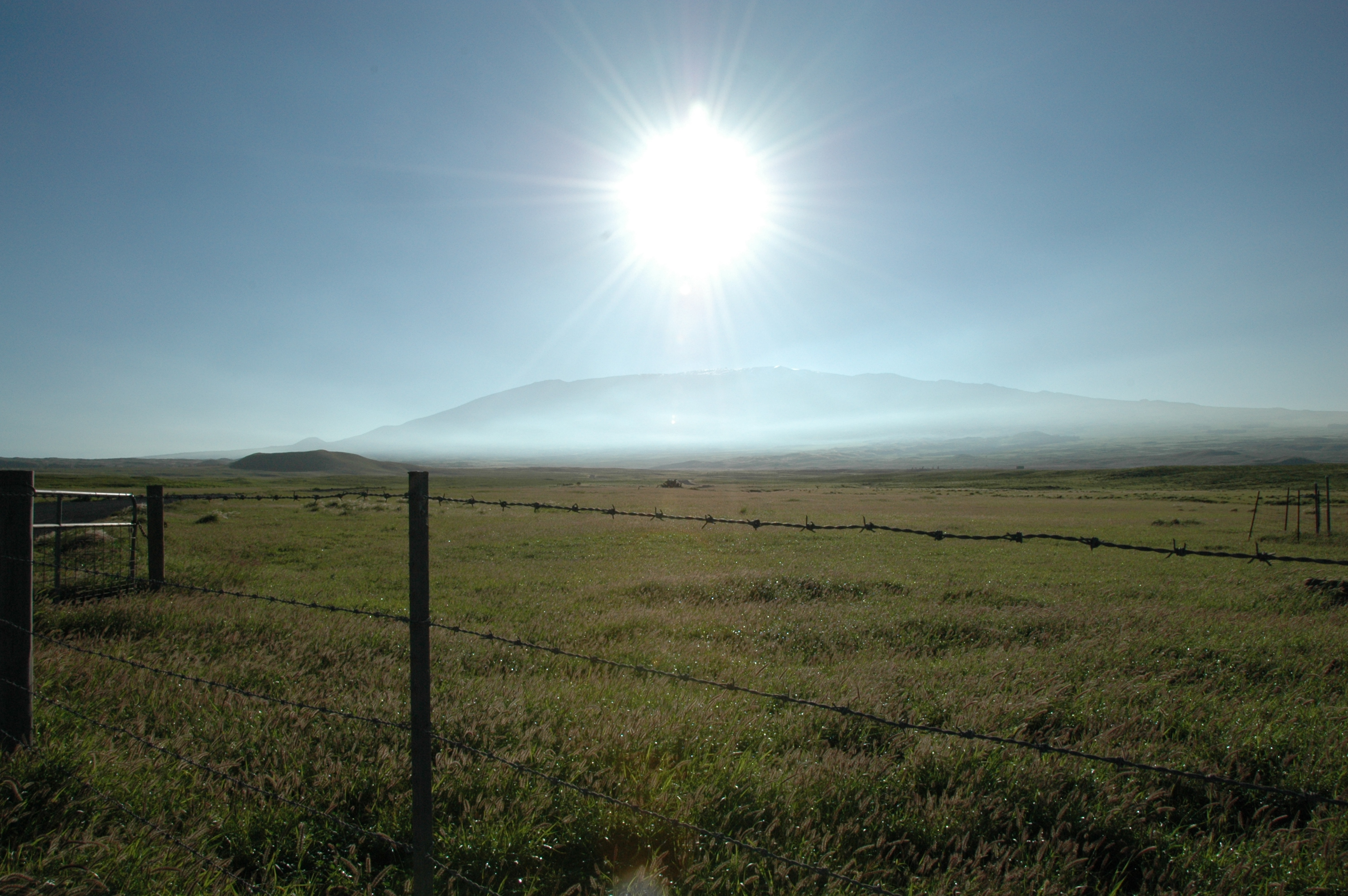
Parker Ranch grazing lands.

Parker Ranch is a working cattle ranch on the Island of Hawaii in the U.S. state of Hawaii, now run by a charitable trust.

== History ==
The ranch was founded in 1847 and is one of the oldest ranches in the United States, pre-dating many mainland ranches in Texas and other southwestern states by more than 30 years. The founder of the ranch was John Palmer Parker who assisted Kamehameha I in ridding the island of feral bulls and was granted land on which he established the ranch. From 1899 to 1937 it was managed by Alfred Wellington Carter (1867–1949).

During World War II, part of the ranch was used as a United States Marine Corps training base called Camp Tarawa. The Second and Fifth Marine Divisions conducted training maneuvers there in preparation for the assault of Iwo Jima.

The Mauna Kea Beach Hotel was developed and constructed by Laurance S. Rockefeller, on land purchased from Parker Ranch.

The last owner of the ranch, the actor Richard Smart, died in 1992. Since then the Ranch has been governed by the Parker Ranch Foundation Trust. The trust benefits the North Hawaii Community Hospital, Hawaii Preparatory Academy, Hawaii Community Foundation, and Parker School.

Following a successful grass-fed beef trial on Hawaii Island, Parker Ranch and Ulupono Initiative announced the launch of the Paniolo Cattle Company, a joint venture aimed at statewide local beef production in March 2014. Paniolo Cattle Company began with 1,400 head of cattle to be raised at Parker Ranch. This represented the largest commitment of grass-fed beef by a single ranch in the state and increased the supply of grass-fed steers to the market by nearly 35 percent.

According to president and CEO Dutch Kuyper, due to the COVID-19 pandemic Parker Ranch canceled their annual 4 July rodeo in 2020. They donated 6,500 pounds (2,900 kg) of grass-fed, ground beef to needy Hawaiians in Waimea. The Food Basket food bank gives it away at various locations in their Ohana Drops.

== Description ==
Spread across approximately 130,000 acres (53,000 ha) of the island, Parker Ranch is among the nation's largest cattle ranches.

A cowboy on the ranch is called a paniolo (Hawaiian language pronunciation of Spanish: Español), since the first cowboys were Spanish-speaking and came from Mexico. The Hawaiian language does not have the "s" sound.

Two of the ranch's historic homes, Puuopelu and Mana Hale, are open for free self guided tours at 66-1304 Mamalahoa Highway about 1-mile (1.6 km) outside of Waimea town. This is also the location of the Corporate Headquarters.

The Parker Ranch Arena and a racetrack are located off the Hawaii Belt Road at coordinates 20°0′34″N 155°40′17″W. The Ranch holds its annual July 4 Rodeo and Horses races at this Historic location.

== Family tree ==
Parker family tree

John Palmer Parker (1790–1868)	Kipikane (1800–1860)
John Palmer Parker II (1827–1891)	Ebenezer Parker (1829–1855)	Kilia Nahoalani (1834–1861)	Mary Ann Kaulalani (1819–1859)
Mary Parker Woods (1851–1909)	Harriet Panana Napela (1852–1901)	Samuel Parker (1853–1920)	Abigail Campbell (1858–1908)	Others
James Frank Woods (1872–1930)	Eva K. Parker (1874–1922)	John Palmer Parker III (1875–1894)	Elizabeth Jane Lanakila Dowsett (1872–1943)	Others
Others	Henry Gaillard Smart	Thelma Parker (1894–1914)
Richard Smart (1913–1992)	Patricia Havens-Monteagle (1913-1982)
Antony Parker Smart (1937-2007)	Gilliard "Gil" Smart (1940-1999)
