= Hawaiʻi Preparatory Academy =

Private school in Kamuela, Hawaii, US

Hawai'i Preparatory Academy
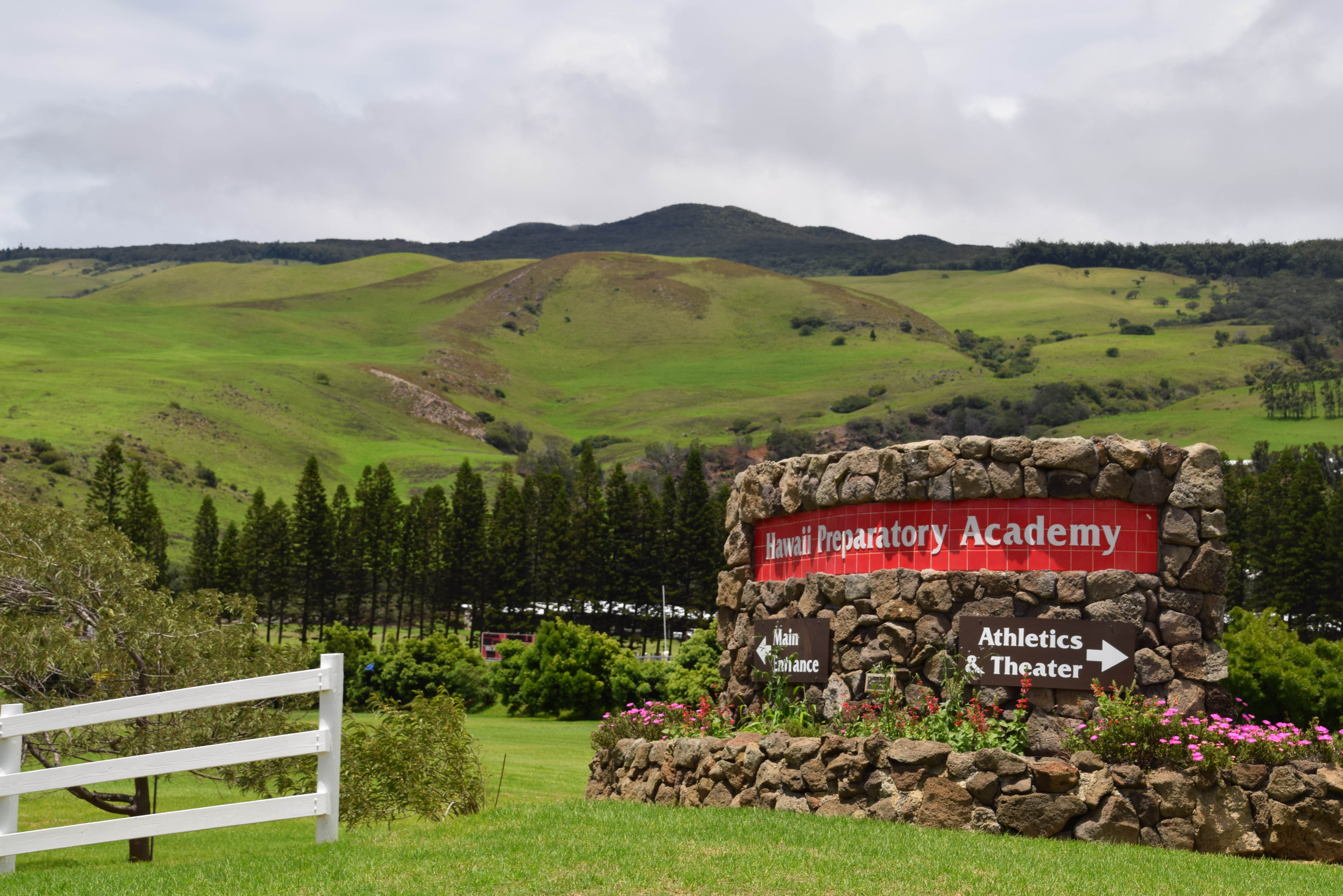
- Upper School Campus

Location
- 65-1274 Kawaihae Rd. Kamuela, Hawaii 96743; United States; 20°1.7695′N 155°42.0606′W

Information
- Type: Private, college-prep, day and boarding
- Established: 1949
- Founder: Harry S. Kennedy
- Head of school: Fred Wawner
- Grades: K–12
- Gender: Coeducational
- Enrollment: 618
- Campus: 2 Campuses (Village and Upper)
- Campus type: Rural
- Colors: Red and White
- Athletics conference: Big Island Interscholastic Federation Division II
- Mascot: Ka Makani
- Accreditation: National Association of Independent Schools, Western Association of Schools and Colleges
- Museum: Isaacs Art Center
- Website: www.hpa.edu

Hawai'i Preparatory Academy (HPA) is a private, coeducational, day and international boarding school located in Kamuela, Hawaii, on the island of Hawaiʻi. Founded in 1949, the school serves students from pre-kindergarten through grade 12 and operates lower, middle, and upper school divisions.

The town is commonly known as Waimea; however, the name Kamuela is used by the United States Postal Service to distinguish it from other locations with the same name.

== Accreditation and curriculum ==
The school is accredited by the National Association of Independent Schools (NAIS) and the Western Association of Schools and Colleges (WASC).

The school maintains capstone programs for all students in grades 5, 8, and 12.

It also hosts the TED organization's TEDxYouth@HPA event.

== History ==
Founded in 1949 by The Right Reverend Harry S. Kennedy, Episcopal Bishop of Honolulu, the school developed under the leadership of James Monroe Taylor II, who was the school headmaster from 1954 to 1974. The school was originally located on the grounds of St. James Episcopal Church in Kamuela, using buildings built as barracks for the United States Marines during World War II.

== Campus ==
=== Dormitories ===
The school has three dormitories: Carter Hall, Perry-Fiske Hall, and Robertson Hall. Carter Hall is an all-female dormitory housing up to 60 students. Perry-Fiske is an all-male dormitory housing up to 70 students. Robertson Hall is a coeducational dormitory. Each building is supervised by a dorm head and has 24/7 security.

=== Village campus ===
The lower and middle schools are located in the center of the town of Waimea. The campus was founded in 1976, with many of the buildings retained from the former Waimea Village Inn. Campus facilities include a school library, a garden, a playground, and a multipurpose facility, built in 2018.

The campus features Isaacs Art Center, a school-owned art gallery that houses a permanent collection of paintings, furniture, rare books, and Hawaiiana.

The building that houses the Isaacs Art Center was built in 1915 as Waimea's first public school structure and received the 2003-2004 Historic Preservation Award from the Historic Hawai'i Foundation. In 2005, the building was named on the National Register of Historic Places.

=== Upper campus ===
Constructed in 1959, the upper school is located at the foot of the Kohala Mountains. Its core buildings were designed by Vladimir Ossipoff. The campus encompasses a total of 320 acres; facilities include a weight room, wrestling room, pool, school library, indoor tennis facility, baseball field, gym, and a bookstore. The athletic facilities include a refurbished football and soccer field, a rubber track, a cross-country course, and a softball field (constructed in 2008). The campus also has classrooms, an art building, and a theater. The Davies Chapel - built in 1967 - features a bell tower, which was taken down in 2015 for restoration. The restoration remains an ongoing effort.

=== Energy lab ===
The campus hosts an energy laboratory used for educational and research purposes. Constructed in 2010, the energy lab has partnered with a variety of organizations, including NASA, the National Oceanic and Atmospheric Administration, and the Pacific Tsunami Warning Center. The building is LEED certified and is classified as a zero-energy building.

== Notable alumni ==
- Angela Aki, pop singer and songwriter
- Mark Andersen, author, community activist, Class of 1982
- Ed Case, U.S. Representative
- Jovan Crnić, Serbian professional basketball player
- Scott Eastwood, actor, model, and son of Clint Eastwood
- Jeff Hubbard, Bodyboarder and 2006 World Champion
- James C. Kennedy, chairman and CEO of COX Enterprises
- William C. Koch Jr., Tennessee Supreme Court Justice
- Chad Kroski, novelist, playwright, and singer
- Graham Salisbury, award-winning author and screenwriter
- Star Simpson, entrepreneur
- Stephen C. Stearns, evolutionary biologist and professor, Yale University
- Daniel Te'o-Nesheim, NFL defensive end
- Max Unger, second-round NFL Draft Pick
- Peter Vitousek, Ecologist and Professor, Stanford University
- Iration, Reggae Band

== Traditions ==
According to school publications, the institution maintains several annual traditions.

According to the school, “Olympics” is a week-long competition among the four high school classes intended to promote participation and school spirit.

The Big Water Slide is an annual spring event held on the hillside of the HPA Upper Campus, featuring a large temporary water slide for student use.

The Fall Ball is an annual school dance with a Halloween theme, held at the Anna Ranch Heritage Center.

== Gallery ==
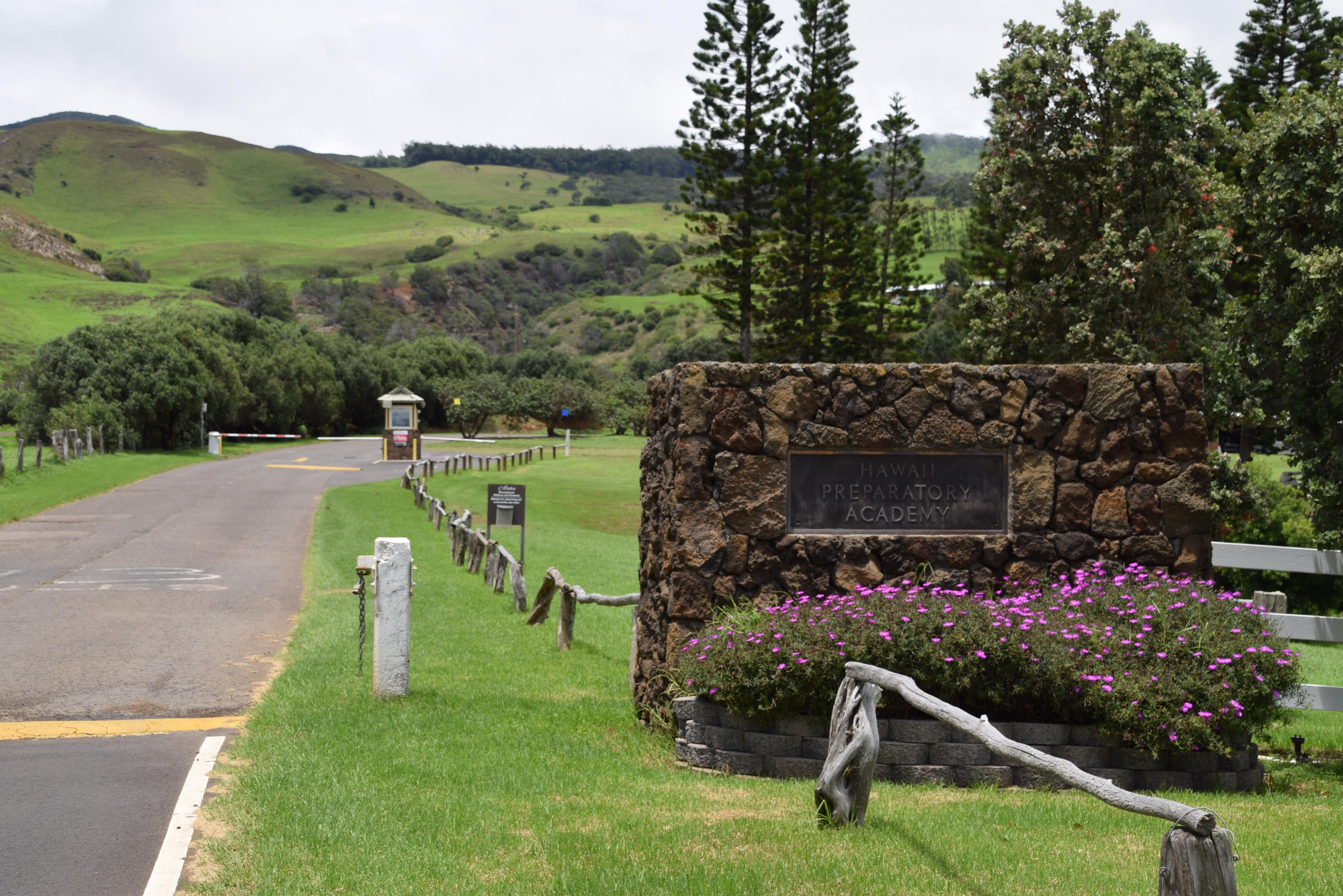
Entrance to HPA's Upper Campus

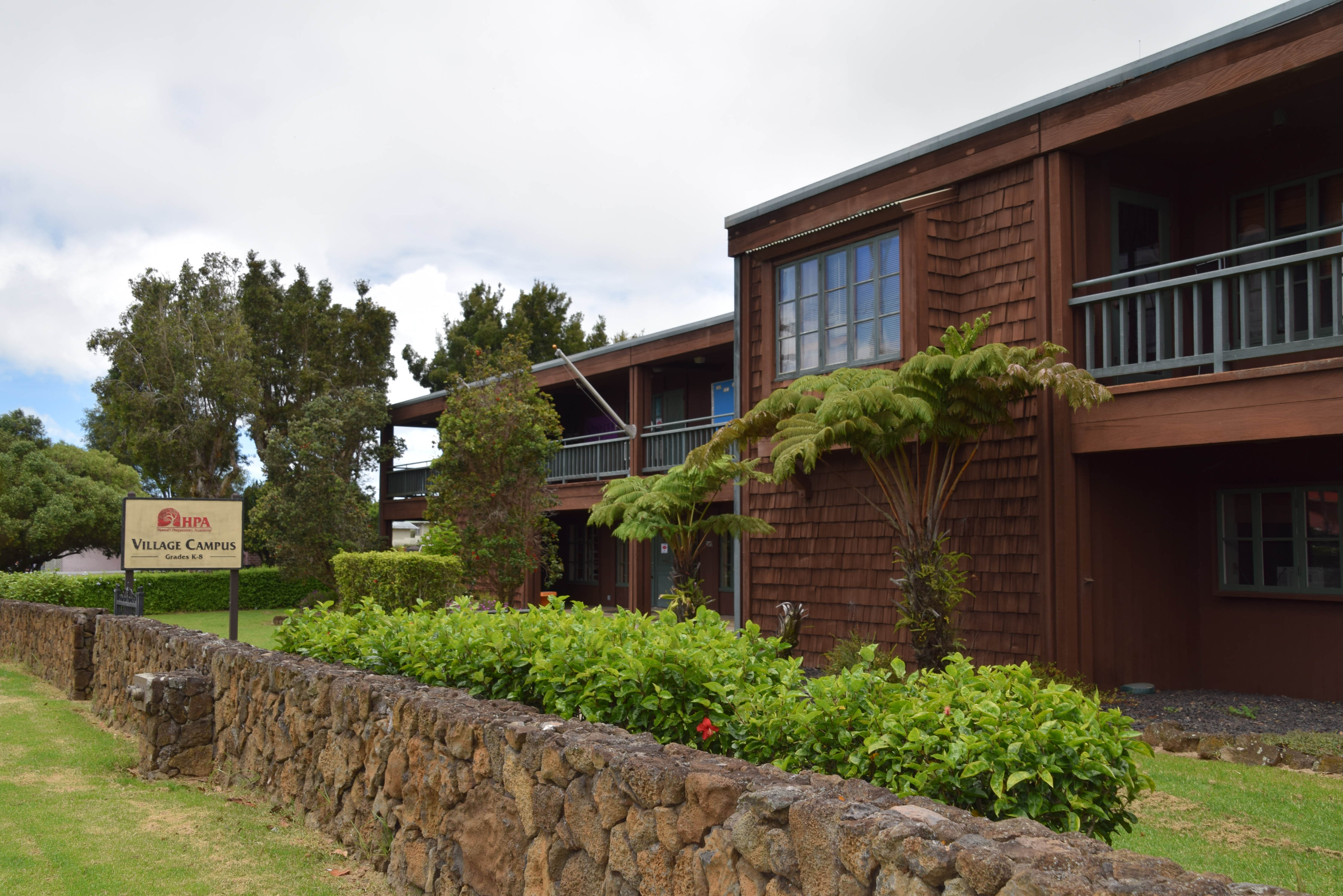
At HPA's Village Campus
