= Hawaiian wild cattle =

Breed of cattle

The Hawaiian wild cattle are a feral breed of domestic cattle introduced at the end of 18th century. Thousands of them are still freely roaming forested areas on the Island of Hawaiʻi. It was listed as "extinct" in The State of the World's Animal Genetic Resources for Food and Agriculture, published by the Food and Agriculture Organization of the United Nations in 2007; it is not among the cattle breeds reported to DAD-IS by the National Animal Germplasm Program of the USDA Agricultural Research Service.

== History ==
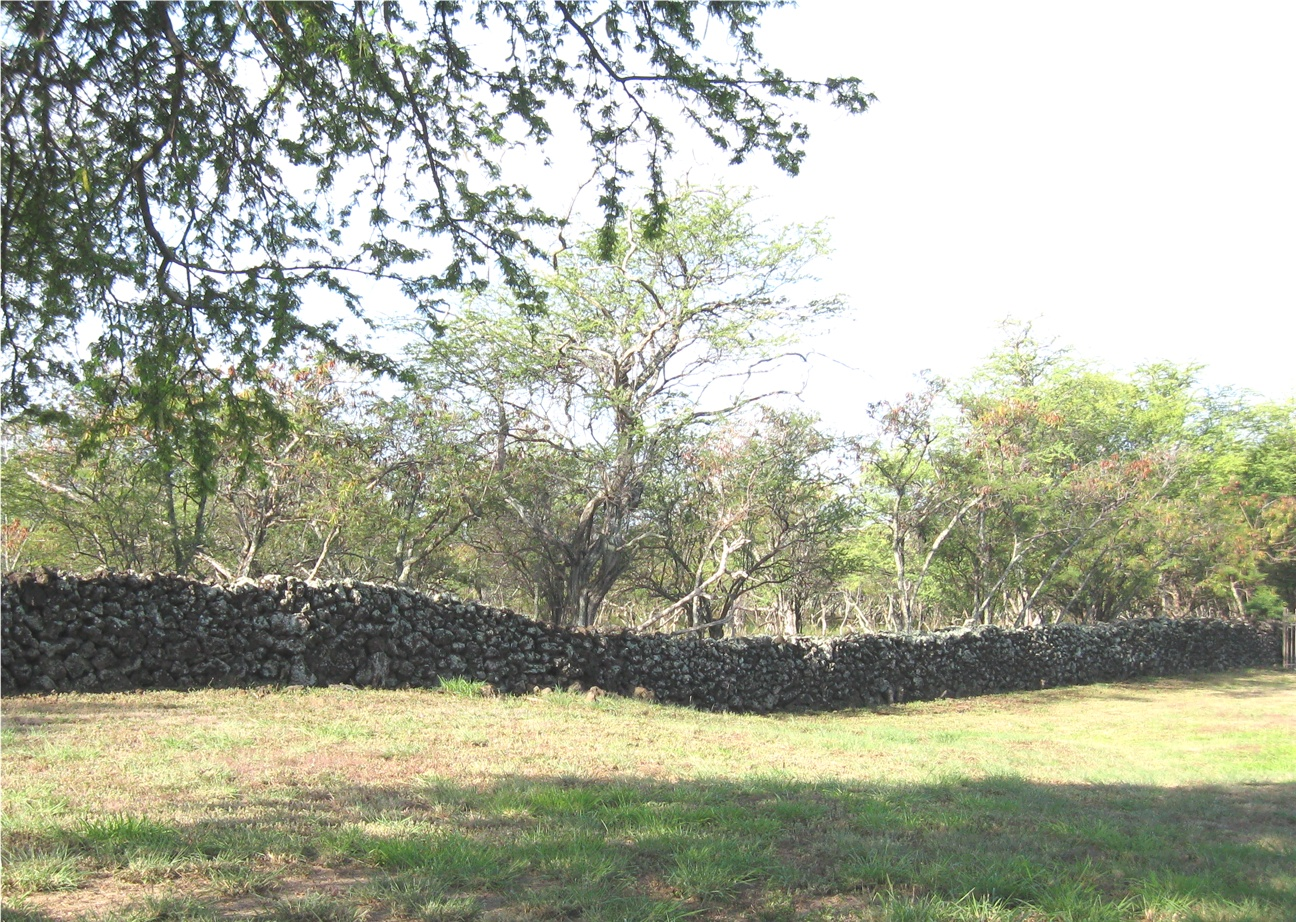
The Great Wall of Kuakini protecting from wild cattle roaming through Kailua (expanded older wall originally built to stop pigs and dogs).

In 1793 and in 1794 Captain George Vancouver gave four bulls and eight cows to Hawaiian king Kamehameha I. Kamehameha placed a kapu (Hawaiian taboo), which was not lifted until 1830, on the hunting of the feral cattle . As a consequence by 1846 25,000 cattle were roaming the countryside in addition to 10,000 semi-domesticated cattle. The huge herds were destroying crops and sometimes even killing people so hunting was begun to reduce numbers of animals. In 1832 Kamehameha III invited vaqueros from California, then part of Mexico, to train native Hawaiians in managing the wild livestock, which led to the development of Hawaiian cowboys - paniolos.

The trampled dead body of Scottish botanist David Douglas (discoverer of the Douglas fir) was found in 1834 in a bullock pit on Mauna Kea. Those traps were known for catching cattle, but the possibility of murder was considered in this case.

Feral cattle contributed significantly to the decline of many plant species in the Hawaiian Islands.

Today the Department of Land and Natural Resources' (DLNR) Division of Forestry and Wildlife (DOFAW) is involved in feral cattle eradication, organizing lotteries for special access feral cattle control. The hunt is not easy as animals have, over the generations, become smaller and wild. Similarly the local feral sheep have developed longer legs. Vehicles frequently hit cows congregated on roads enjoying the sun heated asphalt. The local legend of "invisible cows" on Mauna Kea originates from these crashes. Road signs warning against cows in darkness or fog are common.

== See also ==
- Cattle
- Cowboy - Hawaiian Paniolo
- Feral organism
