= Waimea, Hawaiʻi County, Hawaii =

Census-designated place in Hawaii, U.S.

Waimea, Hawaii Kamuela
- Census-designated place
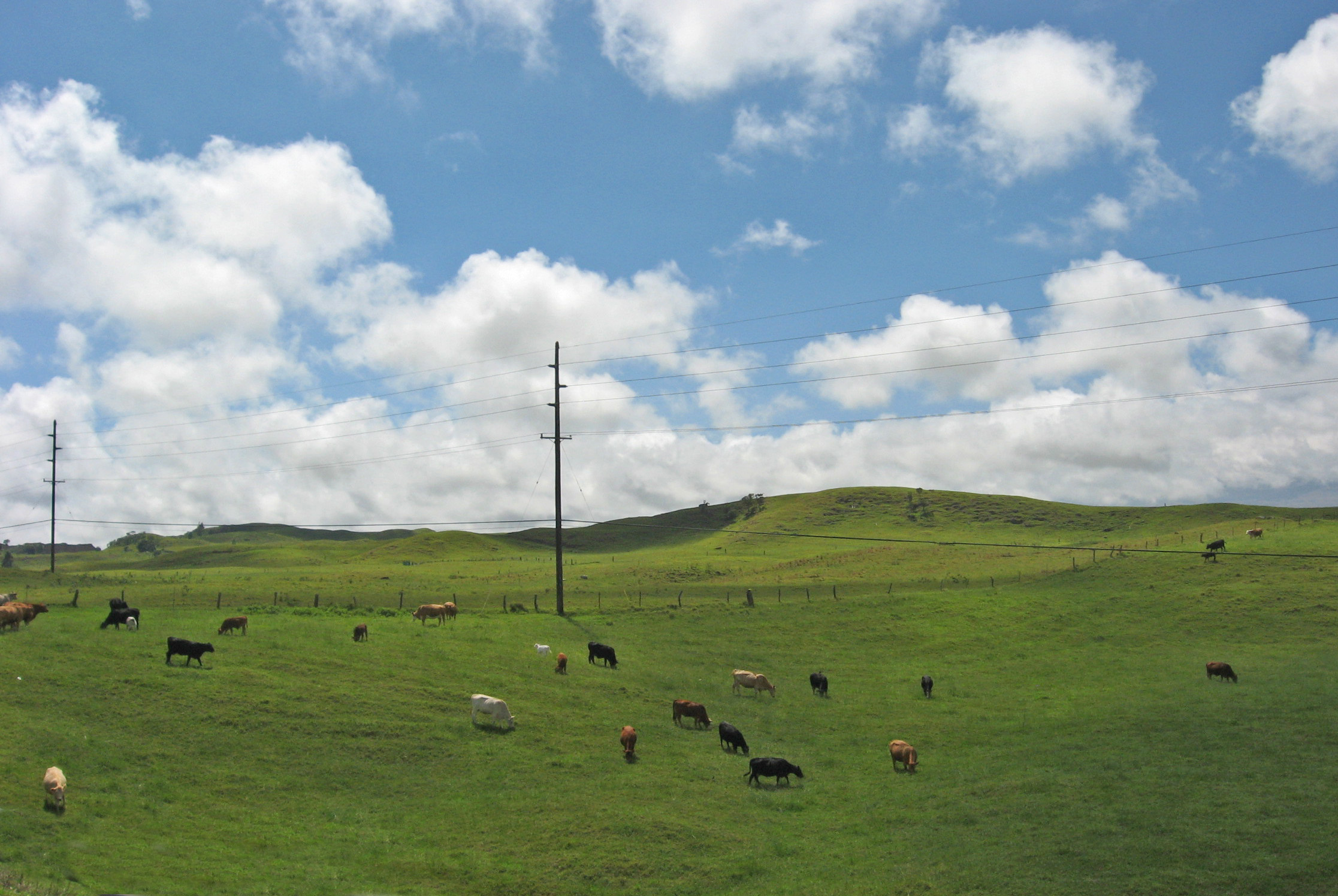
- Some cattle pastures just outside Waimea, August 2007

- Location in Hawaii County and the state of Hawaii

- Location in Hawaii
- Coordinates: 20°1′13″N 155°40′4″W
- Country: United States
- State: Hawaii
- County: Hawaii

Area
  - Total: 39.42 sq mi (102.11 km^{2})
  - Land: 39.39 sq mi (102.01 km^{2})
  - Water: 0.039 sq mi (0.10 km^{2})
- Elevation: 2,670 ft (810 m)

Population (2020)
  - Total: 9,904
  - Density: 251.5/sq mi (97.09/km^{2})
- Time zone: UTC-10 (Hawaii-Aleutian)
- ZIP code: 96743
- Area code: 808
- FIPS code: 15-78500
- GNIS feature ID: 2414164

Waimea is a landlocked community in Hawaiʻi County, Hawaii, United States. Waimea is the center for ranching activities and paniolo culture. The name Waimea means reddish water. For statistical purposes, the United States Census Bureau has defined that community as a census-designated place (CDP). The population was 7,028 at the 2000 census and 9,212 at the 2010 census.

Since each U.S. state cannot have more than one post office of the same name, and there is a post office in Waimea, Kauai County, the official U.S. Post Office designation for Waimea is Kamuela, although this name is only used by the post office, not by locals nor road signage.

The Parker Ranch in and around Waimea is the largest privately owned cattle ranch in the United States, and the annual Fourth of July rodeo is a major event. The Waimea Cherry Blossom Heritage Festival is held annually in the first week of February.

Waimea is home to the headquarters of two astronomical observatories located on Mauna Kea, the W. M. Keck Observatory and the Canada–France–Hawaii Telescope. It is headquarters of the International Lunar Observatory Association.

Waimea is the home of Hawaii Preparatory Academy and Parker School, two of the top independent schools in Hawaii.

== History ==
=== Native Hawaiian ===
It is believed that the watershed area of the Kohala mountains once supported several thousand native Hawaiians, who practiced subsistence agriculture, made kapa, and thatched dwellings. As the Europeans arrived in the area, most of the sandalwood (Santalum ellipticum) forests were harvested and the land became ideal for grazing animals. California longhorn cattle were given as a gift to Hawaiian King Kamehameha I by British Captain George Vancouver in 1793. In 1809, John Palmer Parker arrived to the area after jumping ship and over time became employed by the king to hunt and tame the population of cattle, which at this point had grown out of control. In 1815 Parker married Kipikane, the daughter of a high-ranking chief, and as a family developed what is now Parker Ranch, the largest ranch in the area.

=== Spanish ===
The early 19th century also saw the arrival from the Viceroyalties of New Spain and Río de la Plata of the horse and Spanish vaqueros ("cowboys"), bringing the traditional Euro-Latin culture of riding and roping skills. The king hired these vaqueros to teach Hawaiians herding and ranching skills, and by 1836 the island had working cowboys. As the Hawaiian culture and Latin vaquero cultured commingled, a unique breed of cowboy emerged, the paniolo.

=== World War II ===
During World War II, beef and vegetable prices increased, and farmers returned to cultivate corn, beets, cabbage and a variety of other green vegetables. Farm and ranchland acreage increased from 75 in 1939 to 518 in 1946. Waimea saw many soldiers during this time, who were stationed at Camp Tarawa. When the war was over and the military had left, Waimea had an entertainment center, the Kahilu Theatre, and an airstrip, Waimea-Kohala Airport.

== Geography ==
Waimea is located in the northern part of the island of Hawaii at an elevation of 2,676 feet (816 m) above sea level. It sits at the southern foot of Kohala, the oldest volcano on the island, and it is near the northwestern base of Mauna Kea, the highest volcano.

Waimea's post office name "Kamuela" is the Hawaiian name for "Samuel", after Samuel Parker (1853–1920), the grandson of John Parker.

Hawaii Route 19 passes through the community, leading southeast 56 miles (90 km) to Hilo and southwest 43 miles (69 km) to Kailua-Kona via a route close to the shore. Hawaii Route 190 leads south from Waimea and provides a shorter inland route to Kailua-Kona of 39 miles (63 km).

According to the United States Census Bureau, the Waimea CDP has a total area of 39.3 square miles (101.9 km^{2}), of which 39.3 square miles (101.8 km^{2}) are land and 0.04 square miles (0.1 km^{2}), or 0.10%, are water.

=== Climate ===
Waimea displays a warm summer Mediterranean Climate (Köppen climate classification Csb). The town sits at the transition between the wet and dry sides of the Big Island, and its weather therefore often changes dramatically over less than a mile.

Climate data for Waimea
Month	Jan	Feb	Mar	Apr	May	Jun	Jul	Aug	Sep	Oct	Nov	Dec	Year
Mean daily maximum °F (°C)	72.6 (22.6)	72.2 (22.3)	72.5 (22.5)	73.3 (22.9)	74.0 (23.3)	74.5 (23.6)	74.6 (23.7)	75.7 (24.3)	76.8 (24.9)	76.8 (24.9)	74.7 (23.7)	72.1 (22.3)	74.2 (23.4)
Mean daily minimum °F (°C)	50.4 (10.2)	50.6 (10.3)	51.7 (10.9)	52.8 (11.6)	54.3 (12.4)	55.4 (13.0)	56.4 (13.6)	57.1 (13.9)	56.9 (13.8)	55.2 (12.9)	54.2 (12.3)	52.3 (11.3)	53.9 (12.2)
Average rainfall inches (mm)	4.74 (120)	3.76 (96)	3.84 (98)	3.08 (78)	1.74 (44)	1.34 (34)	1.97 (50)	2.27 (58)	0.89 (23)	1.89 (48)	2.94 (75)	4.22 (107)	32.68 (831)
Source: http://www.wrcc.dri.edu/cgi-bin/cliMAIN.pl?hi3077

== Demographics ==
Historical population
Census	Pop.	Note	%±
2000	7,028		—
2010	9,212		31.1%
2020	9,904		7.5%
U.S. Decennial Census

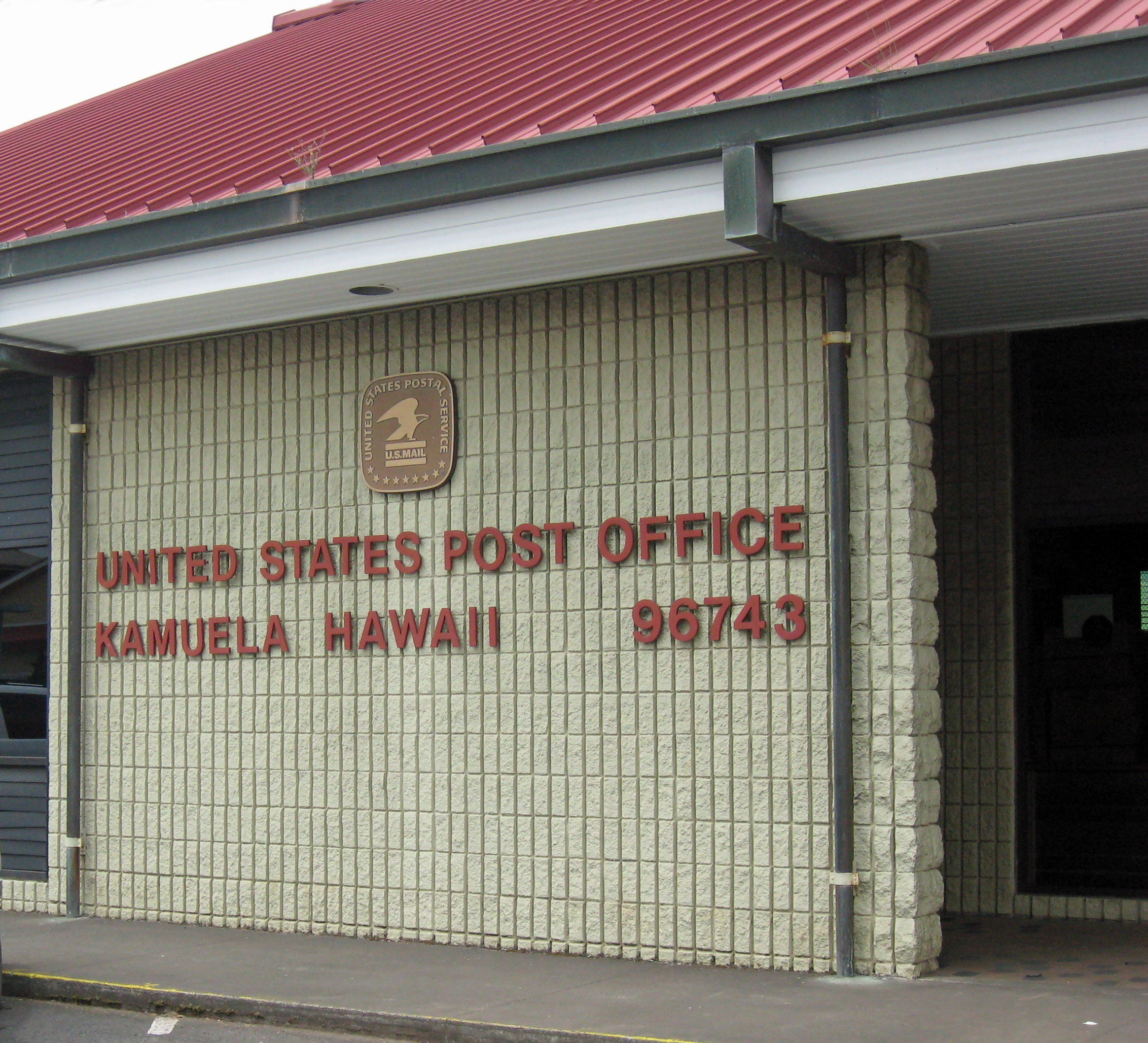
The post office for Waimea, named Kamuela, June 2009

As of the census of 2000, there were 7,028 people, 2,371 households, and 1,782 families residing in the CDP. The population density was 181.4 inhabitants per square mile (70.0/km^{2}). There were 2,589 housing units at an average density of 66.8 per square mile (25.8/km^{2}). The racial makeup of the CDP was 30.65% White, 0.33% Black or African American, 0.17% Native American, 20.29% Asian, 15.61% Native Hawaiian and other Pacific Islander, 0.73% from other races, and 32.23% from two or more races. Hispanic or Latino residents of any race were 7.80% of the population.

There were 2,371 households, out of which 39.0% had children under the age of 18 living with them, 56.6% were married couples living together, 13.2% had a female householder with no husband present, and 24.8% were non-families. 18.9% of all households were made up of individuals, and 5.7% had someone living alone who was 65 years of age or older. The average household size was 2.95 and the average family size was 3.36.

In the CDP 29.7% of the population was under the age of 18, 7.1% was from 18 to 24, 28.1% from 25 to 44, 25.0% from 45 to 64, and 10.1% was 65 years of age or older. The median age was 36 years. For every 100 females, there were 97.4 males. For every 100 females age 18 and over, there were 94.0 males.

The median income for a household in the CDP was $51,150, and the median income for a family was $55,822. Males had a median income of $36,710 versus $27,217 for females. The per capita income for the CDP was $20,773. About 4.2% of families and 6.0% of the population were below the poverty line, including 8.7% of those under age 18 and 5.4% of those age 65 or over.

== Arts and culture ==
The Waimea Cherry Blossom Heritage Festival is held on the first weekend of February. The rodeo and Horse Races are held at Parker Ranch on July 4 each year.

== Education ==
The statewide school district is the Hawaii State Department of Education, and it covers Hawaii County. Schools in Waimea include Waimea Elementary School and Waimea Middle School.

The Hawaii State Public Library System operates the Thelma Parker Memorial Public and School Library.

== Notable people ==
- Michael Rikio Ming Hee Ho, American conceptual artist
- Sonny Lim, Musical artist

== See also ==
- List of census-designated places in Hawaii
- History of Hawaii
