= 26th Hawaii Territorial Legislature =

Session of the Hawaii Territorial Legislature

26th Hawaiʻi Territorial Legislature
←	25th	27th	→
- Seal of the Territory of Hawaii

Overview
- Legislative body: Hawaii Territorial Legislature
- Jurisdiction: Territory of Hawaii, United States

Senate
- Members: 15
- President: Wilfred C. Tsukiyama
- Vice President: Thelma Akana Harrison

House of Representatives
- Members: 30
- Speaker: Hiram L. Fong
- Vice Speaker: Hebden Porteus

The Twenty-Sixth Legislature of the Territory of Hawaii was a session of the Hawaii Territorial Legislature. The session convened in Honolulu, Hawaii, and ran from February 21 until May 19, 1951.

== Legislative session ==
The session ran from February 21 until May 19, 1951. It passed 326 bills into law.

== Senators ==
↓
9	6
Republican	Democratic

Affiliation	Party (Shading indicates majority caucus)			Total	
Affiliation	Republican	Ind	Democratic	Total	Vacant
End of previous legislature (1950)	9	0	6	15	0
Begin (1951)	9	0	6	15	0
Latest voting share	60%		40%		

District	Senator	Party	County	Address
1	Eugene S. Capellas	R	Hawaiʻi	Hilo
1	William H. Hill	R	Hawaiʻi	Hilo
1	William J. Nobriga	R	Hawaiʻi	Hilo
1	Tom T. Okino	D	Hawaiʻi	Hilo
2	Toshio Ansai	R	Maui	Wailuku
2	Wendell F. Crockett	R	Maui	Wailuku
2	John Gomes Duarte	D	Maui	Wailuku
3	Benjamin F. Dillingham	R	Oahu	Honolulu
3	Thelma Akana Harrison	R	Oahu	Honolulu
3	William H. Heen	D	Oahu	Honolulu
3	Herbert K. H. Lee	D	Oahu	Honolulu
3	Mary K. Robinson	R	Oahu	Honolulu
3	Wilfred C. Tsukiyama	R	Oahu	Honolulu
4	Manuel R. Aguiar Jr.	D	Kauaʻi	Kapaa
4	John B. Fernandes	D	Kauaʻi	Kapaa

== House of Representatives ==
↓
21	9
Republican	Democratic

Affiliation	Party (Shading indicates majority caucus)			Total	
Affiliation	Republican	Ind	Democratic	Total	Vacant
End of previous legislature (1950)	20	0	10	30	0
Begin (1951)	21	0	9	30	0
Latest voting share	70%		30%		

District	Representative	Party	County	Address
1	Joseph R. Garcia Jr.	R	Hawaiʻi	Hakalau
1	Peter N. Pakele Jr.	R	Hawaiʻi	Hilo
1	Thomas T. Sakakihara	R	Hawaiʻi	Hilo
1	Joseph Takao Yamauchi	R	Hawaiʻi	Hilo
2	Robert L. Hind Jr.	R	Hawaiʻi	Holualoa
2	Earl A. Nielsen	D	Hawaiʻi	Kealakekua
2	Esther K. Richardson	R	Hawaiʻi	Kealakekua
2	Julian R. Yates Sr.	R	Hawaiʻi	Kealakekua
3	Dee Duponte	D	Maui	Wailuku
3	Kaneo Kishimoto	D	Maui	Wailuku
3	E. P. Lydgate	R	Maui	Paia
3	Manuel Gomes Paschoal	R	Maui	Wailuku
3	Clarence K. Seong	D	Maui	Wailuku
3	Richard St. Sure	R	Maui	Paia
4	Flora Kaai Hayes	R	Oahu	Honolulu
4	Jack P. King	R	Oahu	Honolulu
4	Walter F. McGuire	R	Oahu	Honolulu
4	Hebden Porteus	R	Oahu	Honolulu
4	J. Ward Russell	R	Oahu	Honolulu
4	Russell Starr	R	Oahu	Honolulu
5	O. Vincent Esposito	D	Oahu	Honolulu
5	Hiram L. Fong	R	Oahu	Honolulu
5	Yasutaka Fukushima	R	Oahu	Wahiawa
5	Mitsuyuki Kido	D	Oahu	Honolulu
5	Steere G. Noda	D	Oahu	Honolulu
5	Clarence Y. Shimamura	R	Oahu	Honolulu
6	Manuel Souza Henriques	D	Kauaʻi	Kapaa
6	William W. Y. Leong	D	Kauaʻi	Kapaa
6	Noboru Miyake	R	Kauaʻi	Lihue
6	Wallace Otsuka	R	Kauaʻi	Lihue
