= 27th Hawaii Territorial Legislature =

Session of the Hawaii Territorial Legislature

27th Hawaiʻi Territorial Legislature
←	26th	28th	→
- Seal of the Territory of Hawaii

Overview
- Legislative body: Hawaii Territorial Legislature
- Jurisdiction: Territory of Hawaii, United States

Senate
- Members: 15
- President: Wilfred C. Tsukiyama
- Vice President: Wendell F. Crockett

House of Representatives
- Members: 30
- Speaker: Hiram L. Fong
- Vice Speaker: Richard St. Sure

The Twenty-Seventh Legislature of the Territory of Hawaii was a session of the Hawaii Territorial Legislature. The session convened in Honolulu, Hawaii, and ran from February 18 until May 19, 1953.

== Legislative sessions ==
The session ran from February 18 until May 19, 1953. It passed 282 bills into law.

A special session ran from April 20 until August 5, 1954. It passed two bills into law, including Act 2, to provide additional funding to the Hawaii Statehood Commission, which was founded in 1947 to pursue statehood status for the territory.

== Senators ==
↓
8	7
Republican	Democratic

Affiliation	Party (Shading indicates majority caucus)			Total	
Affiliation	Republican	Ind	Democratic	Total	Vacant
End of previous legislature (1951)	9	0	6	15	0
Begin (1953)	8	0	7	15	0
Latest voting share	53.3%		46.7%		

District	Senator	Party	County	Address
1	Kazuhisa Abe	D	Hawaiʻi	Hilo
1	William H. Hill	R	Hawaiʻi	Hilo
1	William J. Nobriga (Note: William J. Nobriga changed party affiliation after the 26th Hawaii Territorial Legislature. He was previously elected as a Republican to represent the 2nd Senatorial District in 1950.)	D	Hawaiʻi	Hilo
1	Tom T. Okino	D	Hawaiʻi	Hilo
2	Toshio Ansai	R	Maui	Wailuku
2	Wendell F. Crockett	R	Maui	Wailuku
2	John Gomes Duarte	D	Maui	Wailuku
3	Benjamin F. Dillingham	R	Oahu	Honolulu
3	William H. Heen	D	Oahu	Honolulu
3	Joseph R. Itagaki	R	Oahu	Honolulu
3	Herbert K. H. Lee	D	Oahu	Honolulu
3	Mary K. Robinson	R	Oahu	Honolulu
3	Wilfred C. Tsukiyama	R	Oahu	Honolulu
4	John B. Fernandes	D	Kauaʻi	Kapaa
4	Noboru Miyake	R	Kauaʻi	Waimea

== House of Representatives ==
↓
19	11
Republican	Democratic

Affiliation	Party (Shading indicates majority caucus)			Total	
Affiliation	Republican	Ind	Democratic	Total	Vacant
End of previous legislature (1951)	21	0	9	30	0
Begin (1953)	19	0	11	30	0
Latest voting share	63.3%		36.7%		

District	Representative	Party	County	Address
1	Joseph R. Garcia, Jr.	R	Hawaiʻi	Hakalau
1	Raymond M. Kobayashi	D	Hawaiʻi	Hilo
1	Thomas T. Sakakihara	R	Hawaiʻi	Hilo
1	Joseph Takao Yamauchi	R	Hawaiʻi	Hilo
2	Robert L. Hind, Jr.	R	Hawaiʻi	Holualoa
2	Akoni Pule	D	Hawaiʻi	Halaula
2	Esther K. Richardson	R	Hawaiʻi	Kealakekua
2	Thomas T. Toguchi	R	Hawaiʻi	Naalehu
3	Dee Duponte	D	Maui	Wailuku
3	E. P. Lydgate	R	Maui	Paia
3	Manuel Gomes Paschoal	R	Maui	Wailuku
3	Richard St. Sure	R	Maui	Paia
3	Clarence K. Seong	D	Maui	Wailuku
3	Bernard H. Tokunaga	R	Maui	Wailuku
4	Webley Edwards	R	Oahu	Honolulu
4	Jack P. King	R	Oahu	Lanikai
4	Walter F. McGuire	R	Oahu	Honolulu
4	Hebden Porteus	R	Oahu	Honolulu
4	J. Ward Russell	R	Oahu	Honolulu
4	W. Russell Starr	R	Oahu	Honolulu
5	O. Vincent Esposito	D	Oahu	Honolulu
5	Hiram L. Fong	R	Oahu	Honolulu
5	Yasutaka Fukushima	R	Oahu	Wahiawa
5	Charles E. Kauhane	D	Oahu	Honolulu
5	Steere G. Noda	D	Oahu	Honolulu
5	Clarence Y. Shimamura	R	Oahu	Honolulu
6	William E. Fernandes	D	Kauaʻi	Kapaa
6	Manuel S. Henriques	D	Kauaʻi	Kapaa
6	Toshio Serizawa	D	Kauaʻi	Lihue
6	Toshiharu Yama	D	Kauaʻi	Lihue
