= 28th Hawaii Territorial Legislature =

Session of the Hawaii Territorial Legislature

28th Hawaiʻi Territorial Legislature
←	27th	29th	→
- Seal of the Territory of Hawaii

Overview
- Legislative body: Hawaii Territorial Legislature
- Jurisdiction: Territory of Hawaii, United States

Senate
- Members: 15
- President: William H. Heen
- Vice President: William J. Nobriga

House of Representatives
- Members: 30
- Speaker: Charles E. Kauhane
- Vice Speaker: Elmer F. Cravalho

The Twenty-Eighth Legislature of the Territory of Hawaii was a session of the Hawaii Territorial Legislature. The session convened in Honolulu, Hawaii, and ran from February 16 until April 29, 1955. The majority of members of this Legislature were elected during the Hawaii Democratic Revolution of 1954.

== Legislative sessions ==
The session ran from February 16 until April 29, 1955. It passed 277 bills into law.

A special session ran from September 17 until September 25, 1956. It passed two bills into law, including Act 2, which provided compensation for public school officials.

== Senators ==
↓
9	6
Democratic	Republican

Affiliation	Party (Shading indicates majority caucus)			Total	
Affiliation	Democratic	Ind	Republican	Total	Vacant
End of previous legislature (1954)	7	0	8	15	0
Begin (1955)	9	0	6	15	0
Latest voting share	60%		40%		

District	Senator	Party	County	Address
1	Kazuhisa Abe	D	Hawaiʻi	Hilo
1	Nelson K. Doi	D	Hawaiʻi	Hilo
1	William H. Hill	R	Hawaiʻi	Hilo
1	William J. Nobriga	D	Hawaiʻi	Hilo
2	Toshio Ansai	R	Maui	Wailuku
2	John Gomes Duarte	D	Maui	Wailuku
2	Dee Duponte	D	Maui	Wailuku
3	Benjamin F. Dillingham	R	Oahu	Honolulu
3	William H. Heen	D	Oahu	Honolulu
3	Joseph R. Itagaki	R	Oahu	Honolulu
3	Herbert K. H. Lee	D	Oahu	Honolulu
3	Sakae Takahashi	D	Oahu	Honolulu
3	Wilfred C. Tsukiyama	R	Oahu	Honolulu
4	John B. Fernandes	D	Kauaʻi	Kapaa
4	Noboru Miyake	R	Kauaʻi	Waimea

== House of Representatives ==
↓
22	8
Democratic	Republican

Affiliation	Party (Shading indicates majority caucus)			Total	
Affiliation	Democratic	Ind	Republican	Total	Vacant
End of previous legislature (1954)	11	0	19	30	0
Begin (1955)	22	0	8	30	0
Latest voting share	73.3%		26.7%		

District	Representative	Party	County	Address
1	Peter A. Aduja	R	Hawaiʻi	Hilo
1	Joseph R. Garcia, Jr.	R	Hawaiʻi	Hakalau
1	Stanley Ikuo Hara	D	Hawaiʻi	Hilo
1	Raymond M. Kobayashi	D	Hawaiʻi	Hilo
2	Robert L. Hind, Jr.	R	Hawaiʻi	Hookena
2	Sumio Nakashima	D	Hawaiʻi	Holualoa
2	Akoni Pule	D	Hawaiʻi	Halaula
2	Esther K. Richardson	R	Hawaiʻi	Kealakekua
3	Elmer F. Cravalho	D	Maui	Waiakoa
3	Robert Nobuichi Kimura	D	Maui	Wailuku
3	E. P. Lydgate	R	Maui	Makawao
3	Manuel Gomes Paschoal	R	Maui	Wailuku
3	David K. Trask, Jr.	D	Maui	Kahului
3	Nadao Yoshinaga	D	Maui	Wailuku
4	Masato Doi	D	Oahu	Honolulu
4	Daniel K. Inouye	D	Oahu	Honolulu
4	Anna Furtado Kahanumoku	D	Oahu	Honolulu
4	Russell Katsuhiro Kono	D	Oahu	Honolulu
4	Spark M. Matsunaga	D	Oahu	Honolulu
4	Hebden Porteus	R	Oahu	Honolulu
5	George R. Ariyoshi	D	Oahu	Honolulu
5	O. Vincent Esposito	D	Oahu	Honolulu
5	Yasutaka Fukushima	R	Oahu	Wahiawa
5	Charles E. Kauhane	D	Oahu	Honolulu
5	Philip P. Minn	D	Oahu	Honolulu
5	Steere G. Noda	D	Oahu	Honolulu
6	William E. Fernandes	D	Kauaʻi	Kapaa
6	Manuel S. Henriques	D	Kauaʻi	Kapaa
6	Toshio Serizawa	D	Kauaʻi	Lihue
6	Toshiharu Yama	D	Kauaʻi	Lihue
