= 25th Hawaii Territorial Legislature =

Session of the Hawaii Territorial Legislature

25th Hawaiʻi Territorial Legislature
←	24th	26th	→
- Seal of the Territory of Hawaii

Overview
- Legislative body: Hawaii Territorial Legislature
- Jurisdiction: Territory of Hawaii, United States

Senate
- Members: 15
- President: Wilfred C. Tsukiyama
- Vice President: Thelma M. Akana

House of Representatives
- Members: 30
- Speaker: Hiram L. Fong
- Vice Speaker: Hebden Porteus

The Twenty-Fifth Legislature of the Territory of Hawaii was a session of the Hawaii Territorial Legislature. A special session convened in Honolulu, Hawaii, and ran from July 26 until October 15, 1949.

== Legislative session ==
The special session ran from July 26 until October 15, 1949. It passed 67 bills into law. A second special session ran from September 29 until October 13, 1950. It passed 6 bills into law.

== Senators ==
↓
9	6
Republican	Democratic

Affiliation	Party (Shading indicates majority caucus)			Total	
Affiliation	Republican	Ind	Democratic	Total	Vacant
End of previous legislature (1947)	8	0	7	15	0
Begin (1949)	9	0	6	15	0
Latest voting share	60%		40%		

District	Senator	Party	County	Address
1	Eugene S. Capellas	R	Hawaiʻi	Hilo
1	William H. Hill	R	Hawaiʻi	Hilo
1	William J. Nobriga	R	Hawaiʻi	Hilo
1	Charles H. Silva	R	Hawaiʻi	Kohala
2	Toshio Ansai	R	Maui	Wailuku
2	John G. Duarte	D	Maui	Wailuku
2	Reuben Goodness	D	Maui	Wailuku
3	Thelma M. Akana	R	Oahu	Honolulu
3	Neal S. Blaisdell	R	Oahu	Honolulu
3	Benjamin F. Dillingham	R	Oahu	Honolulu
3	William H. Heen	D	Oahu	Honolulu
3	Herbert K. H. Lee	D	Oahu	Honolulu
3	Wilfred C. Tsukiyama	R	Oahu	Honolulu
4	Manuel R. Aguiar, Jr.	D	Kauaʻi	Kapaa
4	John B. Fernandes	D	Kauaʻi	Kapaa

== House of Representatives ==
↓
20	10
Republican	Democratic

Affiliation	Party (Shading indicates majority caucus)			Total	
Affiliation	Republican	Ind	Democratic	Total	Vacant
End of previous legislature (1947)	15	0	15	30	0
Begin (1949)	20	0	10	30	0
Latest voting share	66.7%		33.3%		

District	Representative	Party	County	Address
1	Joseph G. Andrews	R	Hawaiʻi	Hilo
1	Joseph R. Garcia, Jr.	R	Hawaiʻi	Hakalau
1	Thomas T. Sakakihara	R	Hawaiʻi	Hilo
1	Joseph T. Yamauchi	R	Hawaiʻi	Hilo
2	Robert L. Hind, Jr.	R	Hawaiʻi	Holualoa
2	Earl A. Nielsen	D	Hawaiʻi	Kealakekua
2	Akoni Pule	D	Hawaiʻi	Halaula
2	Esther K. Richardson	R	Hawaiʻi	Kealakekua
3	Alfred Afat Apaka (Note: Apaka was the last Representative from the County of Maui to reside on another island besides Maui until Pedro Dela Cruz was elected to serve in the Thirtieth Territorial Legislature on November 4, 1958.)	R	Maui	Hoolehua (Molokai)
3	Allan Hart Ezell	D	Maui	Wailuku
3	E. P. Lydgate	R	Maui	Makawao
3	Manuel Gomes Paschoal	R	Maui	Wailuku
3	Clarence K. Seong	D	Maui	Wailuku
3	Thomas T. Tagawa	D	Maui	Wailuku
4	Flora Kaai Hayes	R	Oahu	Honolulu
4	Samuel M. Ichinose	R	Oahu	Honolulu
4	Jack P. King	R	Oahu	Honolulu
4	Walter F. McGuire	R	Oahu	Honolulu
4	Kenneth T. Olds	R	Oahu	Honolulu
4	Hebden Porteus	R	Oahu	Honolulu
5	Hiram L. Fong	R	Oahu	Honolulu
5	Joseph Itagaki	R	Oahu	Wahiawa
5	Charles E. Kauhane	D	Oahu	Honolulu
5	Mitsuyuki Kido	D	Oahu	Honolulu
5	Steere G. Noda	D	Oahu	Honolulu
5	James K. Trask	D	Oahu	Kaneohe
6	Matsuki Arashiro	D	Kauaʻi	Kalaheo
6	Norito Kawakami	R	Kauaʻi	Lihue
6	A. Q. Marcallino	R	Kauaʻi	Eleele
6	Noboru Miyake	R	Kauaʻi	Waimea
