= 24th Hawaii Territorial Legislature =

Session of the Hawaii Territorial Legislature

24th Hawaiʻi Territorial Legislature
←	23rd	25th	→
- Seal of the Territory of Hawaii

Overview
- Legislative body: Hawaii Territorial Legislature
- Jurisdiction: Territory of Hawaii, United States

Senate
- Members: 15
- President: Clement Gomes
- Vice President: Thelma M. Akana

House of Representatives
- Members: 30
- Speaker: Manuel Gomes Paschoal (Note: Manuel Gomes Paschoal, a Republican, was elected Speaker. In the event of tie vote, Paschoal would cast the deciding vote.)
- Vice Speaker: Hiram L. Fong and Charles E. Kauhane (Co-Vice Speakers) (Note: Two Vice Speakers were elected due to equal party representation in the House of Representatives.)

The Twenty-Fourth Legislature of the Territory of Hawaii was a session of the Hawaii Territorial Legislature. The session convened in Honolulu, Hawaii, and ran from February 19 until May 3, 1947.

== Legislative session ==
The session ran from February 19 until May 3, 1947. It passed 248 bills into law. The Department of the Interior provided $47,200 for legislative expenses, including compensation and mileage of members. This Legislature amended the territory's child labor law during this session by raising the certification age for minors employed in the agriculture industry from 16 to 18 years. The minimum employment age of minors was also raised from 12 to 14 years.

== Senators ==
↓
8	7
Republican	Democratic

Affiliation	Party (Shading indicates majority caucus)			Total	
Affiliation	Republican	Ind	Democratic	Total	Vacant
End of previous legislature (1945)	8	0	7	15	0
Begin (1947)	8	0	7	15	0
Latest voting share	53.3%		46.7%		

District	Senator	Party	County	Address
1	Eugene S. Capellas	R	Hawaiʻi	Hilo
1	Raymond M. Y. Chang (Note: Filled a vacancy caused by the death of Senator Thomas Pedro, Jr.)	D	Hawaiʻi	Hilo
1	William H. Hill	R	Hawaiʻi	Hilo
1	Charles H. Silva	R	Hawaiʻi	Kohala
2	Clarence A. Crozier	D	Maui	Kokomo
2	Reuben Goodness	D	Maui	Wailuku
2	Harold W. Rice	D	Maui	Kula
3	Thelma M. Akana	R	Oahu	Honolulu
3	Neal S. Blaisdell	R	Oahu	Honolulu
3	Francis H. Ii Brown	R	Oahu	Honolulu
3	Ernest N. Heen	D	Oahu	Aiea
3	William H. Heen	D	Oahu	Honolulu
3	Wilfred C. Tsukiyama	R	Oahu	Honolulu
4	John B. Fernandes	D	Kauaʻi	Kapaa
4	Clement Gomes	R	Kauaʻi	Kapaa

== House of Representatives ==
↓
15	15
Republican	Democratic

Affiliation	Party (Shading indicates majority caucus)			Total	
Affiliation	Republican	Ind	Democratic	Total	Vacant
End of previous legislature (1945)	21	0	9	30	0
Begin (1947)	15 (Note: Manuel Gomes Paschoal, a Republican, was elected Speaker. In the event of tie vote, Paschoal would cast the deciding vote.)	0	15	30	0
Latest voting share	50%		50%		

District	Representative	Party	County	Address
1	Joseph G. Andrews	R	Hawaiʻi	Hilo
1	Amos A. Ignacio	D	Hawaiʻi	Pepeekeo
1	Peter N. Pakele, Jr.	R	Hawaiʻi	Hilo
1	Thomas T. Sakaklhara	R	Hawaiʻi	Hilo
2	Kenneth D. Bond	R	Hawaiʻi	Hawi
2	Earl A. Nielsen	D	Hawaiʻi	Kealakekua
2	Akoni Pule	D	Hawaiʻi	Halaula
2	Esther K. Richardson	R	Hawaiʻi	Kealakekua
3	Alfred Afat Apaka (Note: Apaka was a resident of the island of Molokai which is a constituent island of the County of Maui.)	R	Maui	Hoolehua (Molokai)
3	Louis K. Fernandez	D	Maui	Kula (Waiakoa)
3	Harry Hanakahi (Note: Hanakahi was a resident of the island of Molokai which is a constituent island of the County of Maui.)	D	Maui	Kaunakakai (Molokai)
3	Joseph A. Kaholokula, Jr.	D	Maui	Wailuku
3	Manuel Gomes Paschoal	R	Maui	Wailuku
3	John E. Pires	D	Maui	Kula (Waiakoa)
4	Walter H. Dillingham	R	Oahu	Honolulu
4	James W. Glover	R	Oahu	Honolulu
4	Flora Kaai Hayes	R	Oahu	Honolulu
4	Herbert K. H. Lee	D	Oahu	Honolulu
4	Walter F. McGuire	R	Oahu	Honolulu
4	Hebden Porteus	R	Oahu	Honolulu
5	Hiram L. Fong	R	Oahu	Honolulu
5	James F. Gilliland	R	Oahu	Honolulu
5	Joseph Itagaki	R	Oahu	Schofield
5	Frank Y. Kam	D	Oahu	Honolulu
5	Charles E. Kauhane	D	Oahu	Honolulu
5	Mitsuyuki Kido	D	Oahu	Honolulu
6	George R. Aguiar	D	Kauaʻi	Hanapepe
6	Matsuki Arashiro	D	Kauaʻi	Kalaheo
6	Manuel S. Henriques	D	Kauaʻi	Kapaa
6	Thomas Ouye	D	Kauaʻi	Lihue
