= 29th Hawaii Territorial Legislature =

Session of the Hawaii Territorial Legislature

29th Hawaiʻi Territorial Legislature
←	28th	30th	→
- Seal of the Territory of Hawaii

Overview
- Legislative body: Hawaii Territorial Legislature
- Jurisdiction: Territory of Hawaii, United States

Senate
- Members: 15
- President: William H. Heen
- Vice President: Dee Duponte

House of Representatives
- Members: 30
- Speaker: O. Vincent Esposito
- Vice Speaker: Raymond M. Kobayashi

The Twenty-Ninth Legislature of the Territory of Hawaii was a session of the Hawaii Territorial Legislature. The session convened in Honolulu, Hawaii, and ran from February 20 until May 7, 1957. This was the final session which comprised 15 senators and 30 representatives.

== Legislative session ==
The session ran from February 20 until May 7, 1957. It passed 322 bills into law.

== Senators ==
↓
12	3
Democratic	Republican

Affiliation	Party (Shading indicates majority caucus)			Total	
Affiliation	Democratic	Ind	Republican	Total	Vacant
End of previous legislature (1956)	9	0	6	15	0
Begin (1957)	12	0	3	15	0
Latest voting share	80%		20%		

District	Senator	Party	County	Address
1	Kazuhisa Abe	D	Hawaiʻi	Hilo
1	Nelson K. Doi	D	Hawaiʻi	Hilo
1	William H. Hill	R	Hawaiʻi	Hilo
1	Tom Okino	D	Hawaiʻi	Hilo
2	John Gomes Duarte	D	Maui	Wailuku
2	Dee Duponte	D	Maui	Wailuku
2	George S. Fukuoka	D	Maui	Wailuku
3	William H. Heen	D	Oahu	Honolulu
3	Mitsuyuki Kido	D	Oahu	Honolulu
3	Herbert K. H. Lee	D	Oahu	Honolulu
3	Oren E. Long	D	Oahu	Honolulu
3	Sakae Takahashi	D	Oahu	Honolulu
3	Wilfred C. Tsukiyama	R	Oahu	Honolulu
4	John B. Fernandes	D	Kauaʻi	Kapaa
4	Noboru Miyake	R	Kauaʻi	Waimea

== House of Representatives ==
↓
18	12
Democratic	Republican

Affiliation	Party (Shading indicates majority caucus)			Total	
Affiliation	Democratic	Ind	Republican	Total	Vacant
End of previous legislature (1956)	22	0	8	30	0
Begin (1957)	18	0	12	30	0
Latest voting share	60%		40%		

District	Representative	Party	County	Address
1	Stafford L. Austin	R	Hawaiʻi	Hilo
1	Stanley Ikuo Hara	D	Hawaiʻi	Hilo
1	Raymond M. Kobayashi	D	Hawaiʻi	Hilo
1	Mark Norman Olds	D	Hawaiʻi	Hilo
2	Bernard G. Kinney	R	Hawaiʻi	Kamuela
2	Sumio Nakashima	D	Hawaiʻi	Kealakekua
2	Akoni Pule	D	Hawaiʻi	Halaula
2	Thomas T. Toguchi	R	Hawaiʻi	Naalehu
3	Ray F. Adams	D	Maui	Wailuku
3	Marquis F. Calmes	R	Maui	Kahului
3	Elmer F. Cravalho	D	Maui	Kula
3	E. P. Lydgate	R	Maui	Paia
3	Bernard Hiroshi Tokunaga	R	Maui	Kahului
3	Nadao Yoshinaga	D	Maui	Wailuku
4	Webley Edwards	R	Oahu	Honolulu
4	Daniel K. Inouye	D	Oahu	Honolulu
4	Anna Furtado Kahanumoku	D	Oahu	Honolulu
4	Spark M. Matsunaga	D	Oahu	Honolulu
4	Hebden Porteus	R	Oahu	Honolulu
4	J. Ward Russell	R	Oahu	Honolulu
5	George R. Ariyoshi	D	Oahu	Honolulu
5	O. Vincent Esposito	D	Oahu	Honolulu
5	Yasutaka Fukushima	R	Oahu	Wahiawa
5	Patsy Takemoto Mink	D	Oahu	Honolulu
5	Philip Minn	D	Oahu	Honolulu
5	Steere G. Noda	D	Oahu	Honolulu
6	Mutt Arashiro	D	Kauaʻi	Kalaheo
6	Jack Bertrand	R	Kauaʻi	Lihue
6	Manuel Souza Henriques	D	Kauaʻi	Kapaa
6	Yoshiichi Yoshida	R	Kauaʻi	Kapaa
