= 23rd Hawaii Territorial Legislature =

Session of the Hawaii Territorial Legislature

23rd Hawaiʻi Territorial Legislature
←	22nd	24th	→
- Seal of the Territory of Hawaii

Overview
- Legislative body: Hawaii Territorial Legislature
- Jurisdiction: Territory of Hawaii, United States

Senate
- Members: 15
- President: Eugene S. Capellas
- Vice President: Clement Gomes

House of Representatives
- Members: 30
- Speaker: Manuel Gomes Paschoal
- Vice Speaker: Hiram L. Fong

The Twenty-Third Legislature of the Territory of Hawaii was a session of the Hawaii Territorial Legislature. The session convened in Honolulu, Hawaii, and ran from February 21 until May 4, 1945. It was the final session convened in Hawaii during World War II, and the first session convened after martial law ended on October 24, 1944.

== Legislative session ==
The session ran from February 21 until May 4, 1945. It passed 277 bills into law, including Act 1, which enacted the Revised Laws of Hawaii 1945, a major repeal, consolidation and enactment of territorial law.

== Senators ==
↓
8	7
Republican	Democratic

Affiliation	Party (Shading indicates majority caucus)			Total	
Affiliation	Republican	Ind	Democratic	Total	Vacant
End of previous legislature (1943)	11	0	4	15	0
Begin (1945)	8	0	7	15	0
Latest voting share	53.3%		46.7%		

District	Senator	Party	County	Address
1	Eugene S. Capellas	R	Hawaiʻi	Hilo
1	William H. Hill	R	Hawaiʻi	Hilo
1	Thomas Pedro Jr.	D	Hawaiʻi	Hilo
1	Charles H. Silva	R	Hawaiʻi	Kohala
2	A. Kamokila Campbell (Note: Campbell was a resident of the island of Molokai which is a constituent island of the County of Maui.)	D	Maui	Kalae (Molokai)
2	Clarence A. Crozier	D	Maui	Kokomo
2	Harold W. Rice	D	Maui	Kula
3	Thelma M. Akana	R	Oahu	Honolulu
3	Francis H. Ii Brown	R	Oahu	Honolulu
3	Charles S. Crane	R	Oahu	Honolulu
3	Ernest N. Heen	D	Oahu	Aiea
3	William H. Heen	D	Oahu	Honolulu
3	Francis K. Sylva	R	Oahu	Honolulu
4	John B. Fernandes	D	Kauaʻi	Kapaa
4	Clement Gomes	R	Kauaʻi	Lihue

== House of Representatives ==
↓
21	9
Republican	Democratic

Affiliation	Party (Shading indicates majority caucus)			Total	
Affiliation	Republican	Ind	Democratic	Total	Vacant
End of previous legislature (1943)	25	0	5	30	0
Begin (1945)	21	0	9	30	0
Latest voting share	70%		30%		

District	Representative	Party	County	Address
1	Joseph G. Andrews	R	Hawaiʻi	Hilo
1	Amos A. Ignacio	D	Hawaiʻi	Pepeekeo
1	William J. Nobriga	R	Hawaiʻi	Hilo
1	William J. Payne	R	Hawaiʻi	Hilo
2	Francis K. Aona	R	Hawaiʻi	Kealakekua
2	Kenneth D. Bond	R	Hawaiʻi	Hawi
2	Esther K. Richardson	R	Hawaiʻi	Kealakekua
2	Robert L. Wilhelm	R	Hawaiʻi	Naalehu
3	Alfred Apaka Afat (Note: Afat was a resident of the island of Molokai which is a constituent island of the County of Maui.)	R	Maui	Hoolehua (Molokai)
3	Reuben Goodness	R	Maui	Wailuku
3	Hal F. Hanna	D	Maui	Wailuku
3	Joseph A. Kaholokula	D	Maui	Paia
3	Manuel Gomes Paschoal	R	Maui	Wailuku
3	Isabelle N. Thompson	D	Maui	Kihei
4	Neal S. Blaisdell	R	Oahu	Honolulu
4	James W. Glover	R	Oahu	Honolulu
4	Flora Kaai Hayes	R	Oahu	Honolulu
4	Herbert K. H. Lee	D	Oahu	Honolulu
4	Walter F. McGuire	R	Oahu	Honolulu
4	Hebden Porteus	R	Oahu	Honolulu
5	Yew Char	D	Oahu	Honolulu
5	Hiram L. Fong	R	Oahu	Honolulu
5	William M. Furtado	R	Oahu	Honolulu
5	George H. Holt Jr.	D	Oahu	Waianae
5	Charles E. Kauhane	D	Oahu	Honolulu
5	Bina Mossman	R	Oahu	Honolulu
6	Nicholas A. Akana	R	Kauaʻi	Kalaheo
6	M. S. Carvalho	R	Kauaʻi	Lihue
6	Manuel S. Henriques	D	Kauaʻi	Kapaa
6	A. Q. Marcallino	R	Kauaʻi	Eleele
