= David Outcalt =

American university chancellor

David Lewis Outcalt
- Born: January 30, 1935
- Died: May 27, 1944 (aged 82); Pacific Palisades, California
- Spouses: Marcia L. Beach (m. 1956; died 2005) Margaret Jeannette Maxwell (m. 2011)
- Children: 4
- Parent(s): Earl Kenyon Outcalt; Alberta Estes Ferguson Outcalt

Academic background
- Education: Pomona College (B.A.); Claremont McKenna College (Masters); Ohio State University (Ph.D)

David Lewis Outcalt (January 30, 1935 – November 2, 2013) was an American academic administrator, mathematician, and violinist. He was the chancellor of the University of Alaska Anchorage and the University of Wisconsin, Green Bay.

== Early life and education ==
Outcalt was born on January 30, 1935, to Earl Kenyon Outcalt, a U.S. Navy officer, and Alberta Estes Ferguson Outcalt. He grew up in La Jolla, California. He attended Pomona College, graduating in 1956 with a degree in mathematics.

== Career ==
Outcalt taught mathematics in Claremont and subsequently at the University of California, Santa Barbara.

In 1980, he moved to Anchorage to become vice chancellor of academic affairs at the University of Alaska Anchorage, and he became the university's chancellor the next year. During his tenure, he focused on expanding the university's academic exchange programs.

In September 1986, he became the second chancellor of the University of Wisconsin, Green Bay. He served until 1993 during a period of growth for the university, and oversaw the construction of the Weidner Center for the Performing Arts, among other facilities. After stepping down, he became part of the business administration faculty, a role he retained until 1998.

== Personal life ==
Outcalt was a violinist.

== Retirement and death ==
Outcalt retired to Kapaa, Hawaii in 1998. After his wife died in 2005, he moved to Pacific Palisades, California. He died there on November 2, 2013.
