= Rosalie Keliʻinoi =

American politician

Member of the Territory of Hawaii House of Representatives for the Sixth District
- In office 1925–1925

Personal details
- Born: Rosalie Enos; September 18, 1875 Wailuku, Maui, Kingdom of Hawaii
- Died: November 2, 1952 (aged 77) Honolulu, Honolulu County, Territory of Hawaii
- Party: Republican
- Spouse(s): Thomas Benjamin Lyons; Samuel Keliʻinoi
- Children: 7
- Parent(s): Augustine Enos; Kininia Makaokatani
- Education: Sacred Hearts Academy

Rosalie Enos Lyons Keliʻinoi (September 18, 1875 – November 2, 1952) was a Portuguese-Native Hawaiian politician of the Territory of Hawaii. In 1925, she became the first woman elected to the Hawaii Territorial Legislature, representing the island of Kauai.

== Early life and family ==
Born August 18, 1875, at Wailuku, on the island of Maui, she was the daughter of Augustine Enos, a Portuguese immigrant to the Kingdom of Hawaii who worked as a rancher and merchant at Makawao, and Kininia Makaokatani, the daughter of a Native Hawaiian farmer from Koloa, on the island of Kauai. She was educated at St. Anthony's School for Girls on Maui at Wailuku and later Sacred Hearts Academy in Honolulu.

At the age of eighteen, she eloped with and married Thomas Benjamin Lyons (1869-1926). T.B. Lyons was born in Hana, Maui. The couple lived in Hana, Maui where their first born son, Augustine John Edward Lyons (1894–1967) was born. After that they moved to Wailuku, Maui. They had a total of seven sons and two daughters. One daughter, Frances died at the age of 4; the other daughter, Cecilia died at the age of 1. They divorced in Jan 11, 1916 and she was remarried to Samuel Keliʻinoi on Feb 20, 1916 at the Congregational Church of Ewa. Both her husbands were active in politics: Lyons was an unsuccessful Democratic candidate for the Hawaii Territorial Legislature and served as postmaster of Wailuku while Keliʻinoi was a member of the Republican Party and was elected as a representative in the legislature from 1903 to 1904 and in 1911. They moved from Maui to Kapaʻa, Kauai in 1917.

== Political career ==
After the passage of the Nineteenth Amendment to the United States Constitution giving women the right to vote, Keliʻinoi entered politics with the assistance of her husband and Hawaii Senator Charles Atwood Rice. She ran for the 1924 Hawaii Territorial election and was elected as a Republican representative for the sixth district (corresponding to the island of Kauai). She became the first woman since the monarchy to sit in the legislature. The Honolulu Star Bulletin reported on Keliinoi's election win:

“When the 13th territorial legislature convenes next February the first woman representative in the history of Hawaii will take her seat. She is Mrs. Rosalie Keliinoi of Kapaa, Kauai who was nominated at the primary as one of four Republican candidates out of a total of 14 contestants and who came second on the ticket at the general election. Mrs. Keliinoi is particularly interested in education and health matters, such as the control of tuberculosis, prevention of malnutrition and the reduction of infant mortality.”

Keliʻinoi served in the 1925 session of the Hawaii Territorial Legislature, as the only female member. During her one term, she introduced sixteen bills and was responsible for the passage of four bills improving upon women's rights in Hawaii. Her notable contributions included a bill which gave married women the right to sell and manage their own lands without their husbands' consent (Act 274), a bill promoting the welfare of pregnant women (Act 31) and a bill designating Huliheʻe Palace as a museum (Act 51). Finally, she had a bill passed that issued back-pay for Kaua'i public school teacher, Adelaide M. Baggott (Act 68).

Keliʻinoi died of heart failure, in Honolulu, on November 2, 1952. She was buried at the Saint Anthony Church Catholic Cemetery in Wailuku. Her status as Hawaii's first female legislator paved the way for other future Hawaiian women in politics. In March 2017, Hawaiʻi Magazine ranked her among a list of the most influential women in Hawaiian history.

== Bibliography ==
- Hawaii (1918). Lydecker, Robert Colfax (ed.). Roster Legislatures of Hawaii, 1841–1918. Honolulu: Hawaiian Gazette Company. OCLC 60737418.
- Peterson, Barbara Bennett (1984). Notable Women of Hawaii. Honolulu: University of Hawaii Press. pp. 214–218. ISBN 978-0-8248-0820-4. OCLC 11030010.
