= Alice Sae Teshima Noda =

American businesswoman, dental hygienist and beauty industry entrepreneur

Alice Sae Teshima Noda (July 28, 1894 – July 25, 1964) was an American businesswoman, a dental hygienist and beauty industry entrepreneur in Hawaii and Tokyo.

== Early life ==
Alice Sae Teshima was born in Fukuoka prefecture, Japan in 1894. She was the daughter of Yasuke Teshima and Eki Kurauchi. Her family immigrated to Hawaii in 1899 and worked as farm laborers before they bought their own pineapple farm in Wahiawa in 1904. She attended Hawaii Kōtō Jogakko, a Japanese language school, graduated from President William McKinley High School. She met her husband, Steere Gikaku Noda, in 1912, and they had four children. As a young mother, she returned to school to train as a dental hygienist at the Honolulu Dental Infirmary, and again a few years later, to learn cosmetology in Los Angeles and New York.

== Career ==
In 1922, Noda was hired to teach dental hygiene to children for the Hawaii Department of Public Instruction. By 1925, she started a chain of beauty salons in Hawaii. That same year, Noda served as personal interpreter and guide when Princess Nobuko Asaka toured the islands. She was president of the Hawaii Dental Hygienists' Association, president and founder of the Honolulu Hairdressers and Cosmetologists Association, and vice-chair of the League of Women Voters chapter in Honolulu. She was the first examiner appointed to the Territorial Board of Beauty Culture, and was credited with bringing fashionable "flapper" bobbed hairstyles and permanent waves to Hawaii.

In 1936, Noda opened a beauty salon in Ginza, Tokyo, where her techniques quickly became fashionable with socialites and actresses. She also wrote a beauty and etiquette column for Japanese newspapers and was considered the "Emily Post of Japan".

In 1941, Noda had to close her Cherry Beauty Salon in Honolulu because of wartime suspicion towards Japanese-Americans. After World War II, Noda became head of the Japanese Women's Society in Honolulu, the first American citizen to hold that position.

== Personal life ==
Teshima enjoyed breeding orchids, collecting antiques, and painting sumi-e.

Teshima died in 1964, just before her 70th birthday.

Her granddaughter Lenny Yajima was executive director of the Japanese Cultural Center of Hawai'i, and president of the Japan-America Society of Hawaii.
