= World Botanical Gardens =

Botanical gardens in Hawaii, United States

Coordinates: 19°54′13.7052″N 155°8′11.9076″W

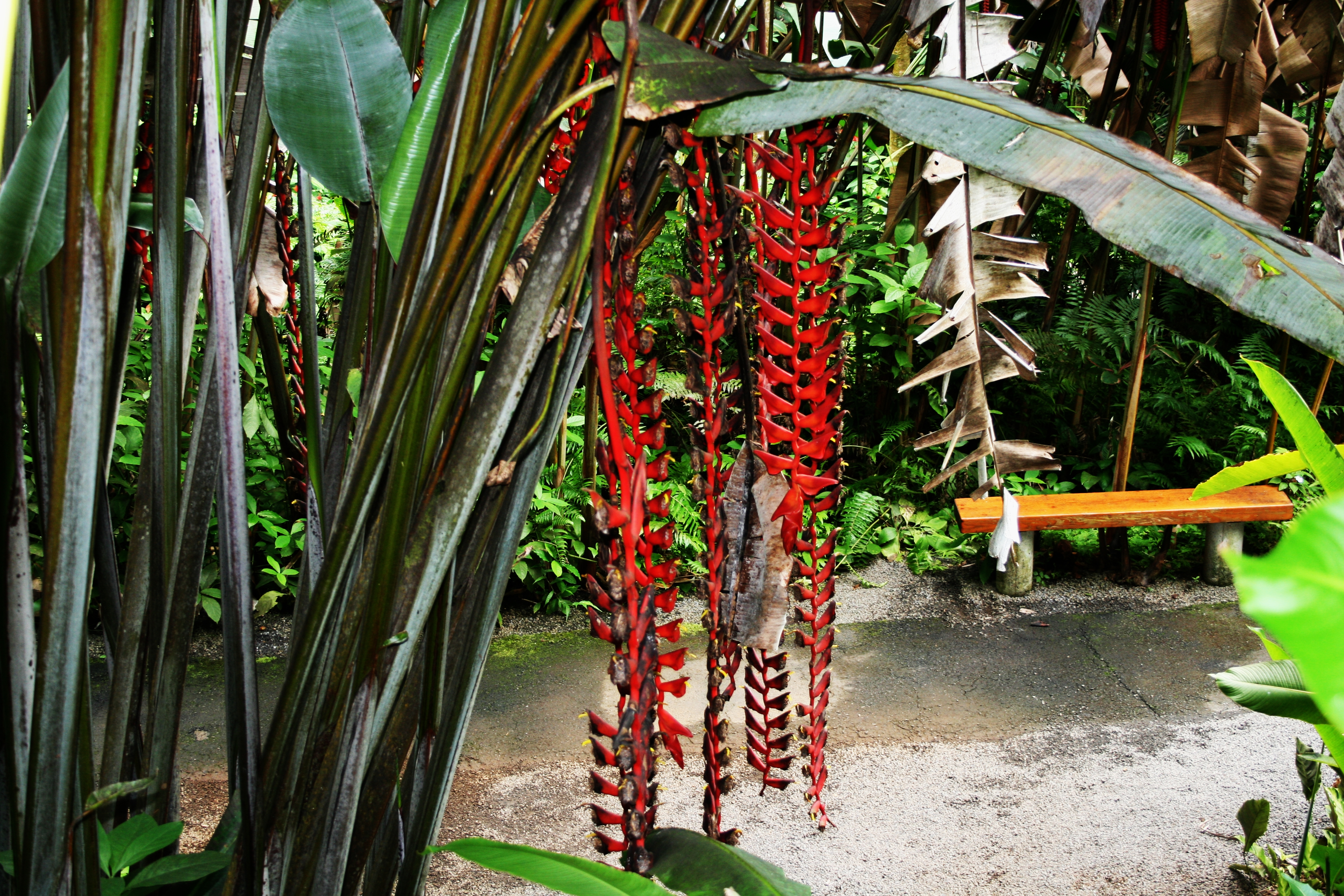
World Botanical Gardens

World Botanical Gardens and Waterfalls, which is a part of Botanical World Adventures, is a commercial botanical gardens with a large waterfall, located between Umauma and Hakalau, at the corner of Leopolino Road and Hawaii Belt Road, State Highway 19, 16 miles north of Hilo, Island of Hawaiʻi, Hawaii. The gardens are open daily with an admission fee. Major features include Kamaʻeʻe Falls, a 100-foot (30 m) waterfall, the second largest maze in Hawaii known as the Children's Maze, over 10 acres (0.040 km^{2}) of arboretum, and many specialized garden areas.

The gardens were established in 1995 by Walter L. Wagner on a 300-acre (1.2 km²) plot of agricultural land situated along the Umauma River and stretching up the slopes of Mauna Kea's slope. The Rainforest Walk, the first section open for public tours, was inaugurated on July 4, 1995.

On September 2, 2004, a change of management of World Botanical Gardens took place, and in 2008 the Umauma Falls overlook and its surrounding 90 acres was sold to Umauma Experience.

In 2009 the garden officially opened a zip-line tour known as Zip Isle Zip Line Adventure descending into the Hanapueo stream gulch. This was developed by Experience Based Learning. This was to become one of many adventures that would initiate the collection known as Botanical World Adventures. The adventures include World Botanical Gardens, Zip Isle Zip Line and in 2011 the addition or Segway Off-Road Rainforest Adventure.

== See also ==
- List of botanical gardens in the United States
