= Augusta, Indiana =

Unincorporated community in Indiana, United States

- Unincorporated community
- Location within Indiana Location within the United States
- Coordinates: 38°19′53″N 87°11′27″W
- Country: United States
- State: Indiana
- County: Pike
- Township: Lockhart
- Elevation: 554 ft (169 m)
- Time zone: UTC-5 (Eastern (EST))
  - Summer (DST): UTC-4 (EDT)
- ZIP code: 47598
- Area code: 812
- GNIS feature ID: 430341

Augusta is an unincorporated community in Lockhart Township, Pike County, in the U.S. state of Indiana.

== History ==
The first permanent settlement at Augusta was made in the 1860s. A post office was established at Augusta in 1874, and remained in operation until 1920.

== Geography ==
Augusta is located north of Indiana State Road 64, 4 miles (6.4 km) south-southeast of Winslow.
