= 1900 Hawaii elections =

1900 Hawaii Territory election
- November 6, 1900
- 1 Delegate to Congress; 15 Territorial Senators; 30 Territorial Representatives

The Hawaiian Organic Act integrated Hawaii as a territory of the United States and required the first territorial elections to be held on November 6, 1900.

The elections were for Delegate to Congress, territorial senators and territorial representatives. The Governor of Hawaii was a position appointed by the U.S. president, and county government would not be approved until 1905. Voters selected a delegate for the remaining 'unexpired' term of the 56th Congress and a delegate for the full term of the 57th Congress. Results are held by the Hawai'i State Archives.

== Multi-Member Districts ==
Territorial senators and representatives were elected from multi-member districts according to the Hawaiian Organic Act as follows.

=== Senatorial Districts ===
District	Administrative Division	Legal Description	Number Elected
1st	Hawaii	"The island of Hawaii."	4
2nd	Maui	"The islands of Maui, Molokai, Lanai, and Kahoolawe."	3
3rd	Oahu	"The island of Oahu."	6
4th	Kauai	"The islands of Kauai and Niihau."	2
TOTAL			15

=== Representative Districts ===
District	Administrative Division	Legal Description	Number Elected
1st	Hawaii	"That portion of the island of Hawaii known as Puna, Hilo, and Hamakua."	4
2nd	Hawaii	"That portion of the island of Hawaii known as Kau, Kona, and Kohala."	4
3rd	Maui	"The islands of Maui, Molokai, Lanai, and Kahoolawe."	6
4th	Oahu	"That portion of the island of Oahu lying east and south of Nuuanu street and a line drawn in extension thereof from the Nuuanu Pali to Mokapu Point."	6
5th	Oahu	"That portion of the island of Oahu lying west and north of the fourth district."	6
6th	Kauai	"The islands of Kauai and Niihau."	4
TOTAL			30

== Election Results ==
=== Delegate to 56th Congress (Unexpired Term) ===
Candidate and Affiliation	Votes by Representative District						Total Votes	Vote Share	Result
Candidate and Affiliation	1st (Hawai'i)	2nd (Hawai'i)	3rd (Maui)	4th (Oahu)	5th (Oahu)	6th (Kaua'i)	Total Votes	Vote Share	Result
Wilcox, R. W. (I)	549	530	711	879	1,095	319	4,083	42.58%	Elected
Parker, Samuel (R)	414	468	581	1,380	843	170	3,856	40.21%	Defeated
Kawananakoa, D. (D)	156	173	388	466	320	147	1,650	17.21%	Defeated
TOTAL	1,119	1,171	1,680	2,725	2,258	636	9,589	100.00%	-

=== Delegate to 57th Congress (Full Term) ===
Candidate and Affiliation	Votes by Representative District						Total Votes	Vote Share	Result
Candidate and Affiliation	1st (Hawai'i)	2nd (Hawai'i)	3rd (Maui)	4th (Oahu)	5th (Oahu)	6th (Kaua'i)	Total Votes	Vote Share	Result
Wilcox, R. W. ()	544	546	714	888	1,097	321	4,108	42.75%	Elected
Parker, Samuel ()	419	464	580	1,381	837	164	3,845	40.01%	Defeated
Kawananakoa, D. ()	152	166	393	476	319	150	1,656	17.23%	Defeated
TOTAL	1,115	1,176	1,687	2,745	2,253	635	9,609	100.00%	-

1st Senatorial District, Hawaii
Candidate and Affiliation	Election Expenses	Votes	Vote Share	Result
John T. Brown (D, I)	$90.95	988	12%	Elected
J. B. Kaohi (I)	$23.50	887	10.77%	Elected
Dr. Nicholas Russel (I)	$77.50	873	10.6%	Elected
J. D. Paris (R)	$60	809	9.83%	Elected
H. L. Holstein (R)	$40	745	9.05%	Defeated
Palmer P. Woods (D)	$155	714	8.67%	Defeated
Henry West (I)	$49.75	712	8.65%	Defeated
A. B. Loebenstein (R)	$315	591	7.18%	Defeated
S. L. Desha (I, R)	$56.15	571	6.94%	Defeated
Sam. Kauhane (D)	$87	538	6.53%	Defeated
C. R. Blacow (R)		364	4.42%	Defeated
C. Kaiaiki (?)		242	2.94%	Defeated
H. S. Rickard (D)	$5	199	2.42%	Defeated
TOTAL		8,233	100.00%	

2nd Senatorial District, Maui
Candidate and Affiliation	Election Expenses	Votes	Vote Share	Result
Kaiue, Samuel (I)	$26.25	746	15.7%	Elected
Baldwin H. P. (R)	$15.50	711	14.96%	Elected
White, WM. (I)	$25	639	13.45%	Elected
Cockett, C. B. (I)	$25	590	12.42%	Defeated
Kepoikai, A. N. (R)	$350	584	12.29%	Defeated
Reuter, M. H. (R)	$5	469	9.87%	Defeated
Cornwell, W. H. (D)	$140	386	8.12%	Defeated
Clark, Thos. (D)	—	327	6.88%	Defeated
Lyons, T. B. (D)	—	300	6.31%	Defeated
TOTAL		4,752	100.00%	

3rd Senatorial District, Oahu
Candidate and Affiliation	Election Expenses	Votes	Vote Share	Result
Brown, Cecil ()	$25	2,175	7.72%	Elected
Crabbe, Clarence ()	$25	2,081	7.39%	Elected
Achi, W. C. ()	$270	2,017	7.16%	Elected
Kalauokalani, D. ()	$154	1,993	7.08%	Elected
Carter, George R. ()	$25	1,983	7.04%	Elected
Kanuha, David ()	$53	1,871	6.64%	Elected
Pua, S. K. ()	$157.50	1,845	6.55%	Defeated
Kaulia, J. K. ()	$207	1,812	6.43%	Defeated
Pahia, Frank ()	$109.25	1,808	6.4%	Defeated
Boyd, R. N. ()	$297	1,747	6.2%	Defeated
Waterhouse, H. ()	$99.25	1,671	5.93%	Defeated
Rowe, E. C. ()	$182.50	1,552	5.51%	Defeated
Carter, J. O. ()	$42.70	1,309	4.65%	Defeated
Isenberg, D. P. R. Jr. ()	$48	1,087	3.86%	Defeated
Holt, J. D. Jr. ()	$25	926	3.29%	Defeated
Auld, William ()		804	2.85%	Defeated
Fernandez, Abraham ()	$25	755	2.68%	Defeated
Lilikalani, E. K. ()	$00	592	2.1%	Defeated
Bipikane, S. W. ()		141	0.5%	Defeated
TOTAL		28,169	100.00%	

4th Senatorial District, Kauai
Candidate and Affiliation	Election Expenses	Votes	Vote Share	Result
Nakapaahu, Luka ()	$31.50	317	26.57%	Elected
Kahilina, I. H. ()	$26.30	299	25.06%	Elected
Wilcox, G. N. ()	—	244	20.45%	Defeated
Rice W. H. ()	—	195	16.35%	Defeated
Bishop, C. H. ()		138	11.57%	Defeated
TOTAL		1,193	100.00%	

1st Representative District, Hawaii
Candidate and Affiliation	Election Expenses	Votes	Vote Share	Result
R. H. Makekau (D, I)	$27	666	16.53%	Elected
S. H. Haaheo (D, I)	$36.50	634	15.74%	Elected
Wm. B. Nailima (D, I)	$33.35	623	15.47%	Elected
J. Ewaliko (I)	$35.50	590	14.65%	Elected
Jas. D. Lewis (R)		363	9.01%	Defeated
R. H. Rycroft (R)		356	8.84%	Defeated
Chas. Williams (R)	$50	316	7.85%	Defeated
Jas. Mattoon (R)	$18.10	265	6.58%	Defeated
Wm. N. Purdy (D)	$5	134	3.33%	Defeated
K. M. Koahou (?)	$10.10	81	2.01%	Defeated
TOTAL		4,028	100.00%	

2nd Representative District, Hawaii
Candidate and Affiliation	Election Expenses	Votes	Vote Share	Result
E. A. Fraser (R)	$160	199	4.53%	Elected
G. P. Kamauoha (R)	$32	434	9.88%	Elected
J. C. Lenhart (R)		262	5.97%	Elected
Julian Monsarratt (R, I)	$227	518	11.8%	Elected
H. M. Kaniho (D, I)	$21.75	555	12.64%	Defeated
J. W. Keliikoa (D, I)	$31.50	547	12.46%	Defeated
J. H. S. Martin (D)	$16	260	5.92%	Defeated
S. H. K. Ne (D)	$45	61	1.39%	Defeated
J. K. Kekaula (I)	$77	491	11.18%	Defeated
C. G. Naope (I)	$59	408	9.29%	Defeated
Wm. Wright (?)	$183.50	400	9.11%	Defeated
S. D. Kanehailua (?)	$16.25	216	4.92%	Defeated
H. P. K. Malulani (?)	$11.75	40	0.91%	Defeated
TOTAL		4,391	100.00%	

3rd Representative District, Maui
Candidate and Affiliation	Election Expenses	Votes	Vote Share	Result
Beckley, F. W. (I)	$50	799	9.01%	Elected
Hihio, J. K. (I)	$25	690	7.78%	Elected
Kawaihoa, Solomon (I)	$50	639	7.21%	Elected
Dickey, C. H. (R)	—	604	6.81%	Elected
Ahulii, Iokua (I)	$35.25	595	6.71%	Elected
Kauimakaole G. P. (I)	—	590	6.65%	Elected
Pali, Philip (R)	—	575	6.48%	Defeated
Hons, Geo. (R)	$9.40	559	6.3%	Defeated
Kahaulelio, D. H. (R)	—	542	6.11%	Defeated
Nakila, J. K. (R)		535	6.03%	Defeated
Long, Henry (?)		501	5.65%	Defeated
Kahaulelio, D. Kalei (I)	$35	387	4.36%	Defeated
Hayselden, F. H. (D)		381	4.3%	Defeated
Nui J. Hapai (?)	$30	360	4.06%	Defeated
Richardson, John (D)	—	336	3.79%	Defeated
Forsyth, A. K. (?)		331	3.73%	Defeated
Naki, Paia (?)	—	327	3.69%	Defeated
Eldredge, D. P. (?)		117	1.32%	Defeated
TOTAL		8,868	100.00%	

4th Representative District, Oahu
Candidate and Affiliation	Election Expenses	Votes	Vote Share	Result
Gilfillan, A. F. ()	$25	1,286	8.49%	Elected
Hoogs, William H. ()	$25	1,277	8.43%	Elected
Robertson, A. G. M. ()	$73.50	1,235	8.16%	Elected
Aylett, William ()	$95	1,157	7.64%	Elected
Kumalae, Jonah ()	$109.25	1,091	7.21%	Elected
Keiki, J. W. ()	$35	1,016	6.71%	Elected
Quinn, J. C. ()	$103.50	914	6.04%	Defeated
Kalauokalani, D. Jr. ()	$154	903	5.96%	Defeated
Kailimai, M. H. ()		814	5.38%	Defeated
Nakookoo, J. K. ()	$25	782	5.16%	Defeated
Meheula, Solomon ()	$132	751	4.96%	Defeated
Clark, J. K. ()	$49	743	4.91%	Defeated
Macfarlane, E. C. ()	$56.95	650	4.29%	Defeated
Wise, John H. ()	$00	567	3.74%	Defeated
Camara, J. M. ()	$34.50	524	3.46%	Defeated
Booth, C. W. ()	$25	510	3.37%	Defeated
Bush, John E. ()	$25	462	3.05%	Defeated
Spencer, S. W. ()	$25	340	2.25%	Defeated
Haiola, P. ()		119	0.79%	Defeated
TOTAL		15,141	100.00%	

5th Representative District, Oahu
Candidate and Affiliation	Election Expenses	Votes	Vote Share	Result
Makainai J. P. ()	$98	1,172	9.17%	Elected
Mahoe, S. K. ()	$216.50	1,014	7.93%	Elected
Mossman, William ()	$160	991	7.75%	Elected
Emmeluth, J. ()	$211	988	7.73%	Elected
Prendergast, J. K. ()	$150	970	7.59%	Elected
Paele, James K. ()	$40.25	874	6.84%	Elected
Lane, John ()	$25	729	5.7%	Defeated
Kaulukou, J. L. ()	$25	723	5.66%	Defeated
Johnson, Enoch ()	$62.50	718	5.62%	Defeated
Hitchcock, H. R. ()	$00	716	5.6%	Defeated
McCandless, L. L. ()	$25	702	5.49%	Defeated
Coelho, W. J. ()	$00	634	4.96%	Defeated
Damon, S. M. ()	$25	593	4.64%	Defeated
Harvey, Frank ()	$25	457	3.58%	Defeated
Brown, Frank ()	$26	405	3.17%	Defeated
Holt, R. W. ()		353	2.76%	Defeated
Mossman, H. J. ()	$25	342	2.68%	Defeated
Poepoe, J. Mokuohai ()	$45	175	1.37%	Defeated
Markham, George ()		139	1.09%	Defeated
Mikalemi, Edward B. ()	$25	86	0.67%	Defeated
TOTAL		12,781	100.00%	

6th Representative District, Kauai
Candidate and Affiliation	Election Expenses	Votes	Vote Share	Result
Puuki, R. ()	$26	321	13.8%	Elected
Akina, J. Apukai ()	$55.50	291	12.51%	Elected
Wilcox, S. W. ()	—	257	11.05%	Elected
Kaauwai, Isaia K. ()	$27	244	10.49%	Elected
Leleiwi, J. B. Kalealeole ()	$25.70	224	9.63%	Defeated
Kaili, S. K. ()	$185	166	7.14%	Defeated
Knudsen, Eric A. ()	$25	135	5.8%	Defeated
Kaeo, S. K. ()		131	5.63%	Defeated
Blake, Charles ()	$5	123	5.29%	Defeated
Kalawaia, D. L. ()	$25.30	114	4.9%	Defeated
Mika, A. K. ()		102	4.39%	Defeated
Sheldon, W. J. ()	$45	100	4.3%	Defeated
Puni, Joseph ()	$40	65	2.79%	Defeated
Waialeale, Robert ()	—	41	1.76%	Defeated
Wenner, William ()		12	0.52%	Defeated
TOTAL		2,326	100.00%	
