= Mary Kapuahualani Robinson =

Hawaii Territorial Senator and businesswoman

Member of the Hawaii Territorial Senate
- In office 1951–1955
- Constituency: 3rd Senatorial district (Oahu)

Personal details
- Born: Mary Kapuahualani Hart; 1895 or 1896
- Died: June 5, 1978 (aged 82)
- Citizenship: United States
- Political party: Republican
- Occupation: Businesswoman
- Nickname: Girlie

Mary Kapuahualani "Girlie" Robinson (born Mary Kapuahualani Hart in 1896–97, died June 5, 1978) was a Republican Senator from Oahu in the Hawaii Territorial Legislature. She was one of two women in the Territorial Senate in 1951, with the other being Thelma Akana Harrison.

Before being elected to the legislature, she was president of We The Women of Hawaii, and worked within the Territorial Government for 21 years.

She attended school at St. Andrew's Priory.

In February 1945, she married local businessman Mark Alexander Robinson. In 1951, she founded Robinson Travel Inc., which had become a multimillion-dollar company by the time of her death in 1978.

== Election history ==
1950 Hawaiian Territorial Senate election: 3rd district
Party	Candidate	Votes	%
Democratic	William H. Heen	45,422	23.3
Republican	Wilfred C. Tsukiyama	42,635	21.9
Republican	Mary K. Robinson	33,504	17.2
Republican	Herbert M. Richards	32,063	16.4
Democratic	Arther K. Trask	30,200	15.5
Democratic	Joseph P. Petrowski	11,119	5.7

== See also ==
- Mark P. Robinson Family

== Bibliography ==
- Judd, Henry P.; Hilleary, Perry Edward (1954). Men and women of Hawaii, 1954; a biographical encyclopedia of persons of notable achievement, an historical account of the peoples who have distinguished themselves through personal success and through public service. Honolulu, HI: Honolulu Business Consultants. pp. 563, 566 – via HathiTrust.
