= Kokomo, Hawaii =

- Interactive map of Kokomo, Hawaii
- Coordinates: 20°52′12″N 156°18′32″W
- Country: United States
- State: Hawaii
- County: Maui
- Elevation: 1,467 ft (447 m)

Kokomo is a community on the island of Maui, Maui County, Hawaii. It is located just north of Makawao. Elevation is about 1,467 feet (447 m).

It is uphill of the area known as Haʻikū. Contrary to popular belief, the Beach Boys' 1988 single of the same name is not based on this Hawaiian community; the song's lyrics refer instead to a fictional island near the Florida Keys.
