= Flora Kaai Hayes =

Politician in Hawaii Territorial Legislature

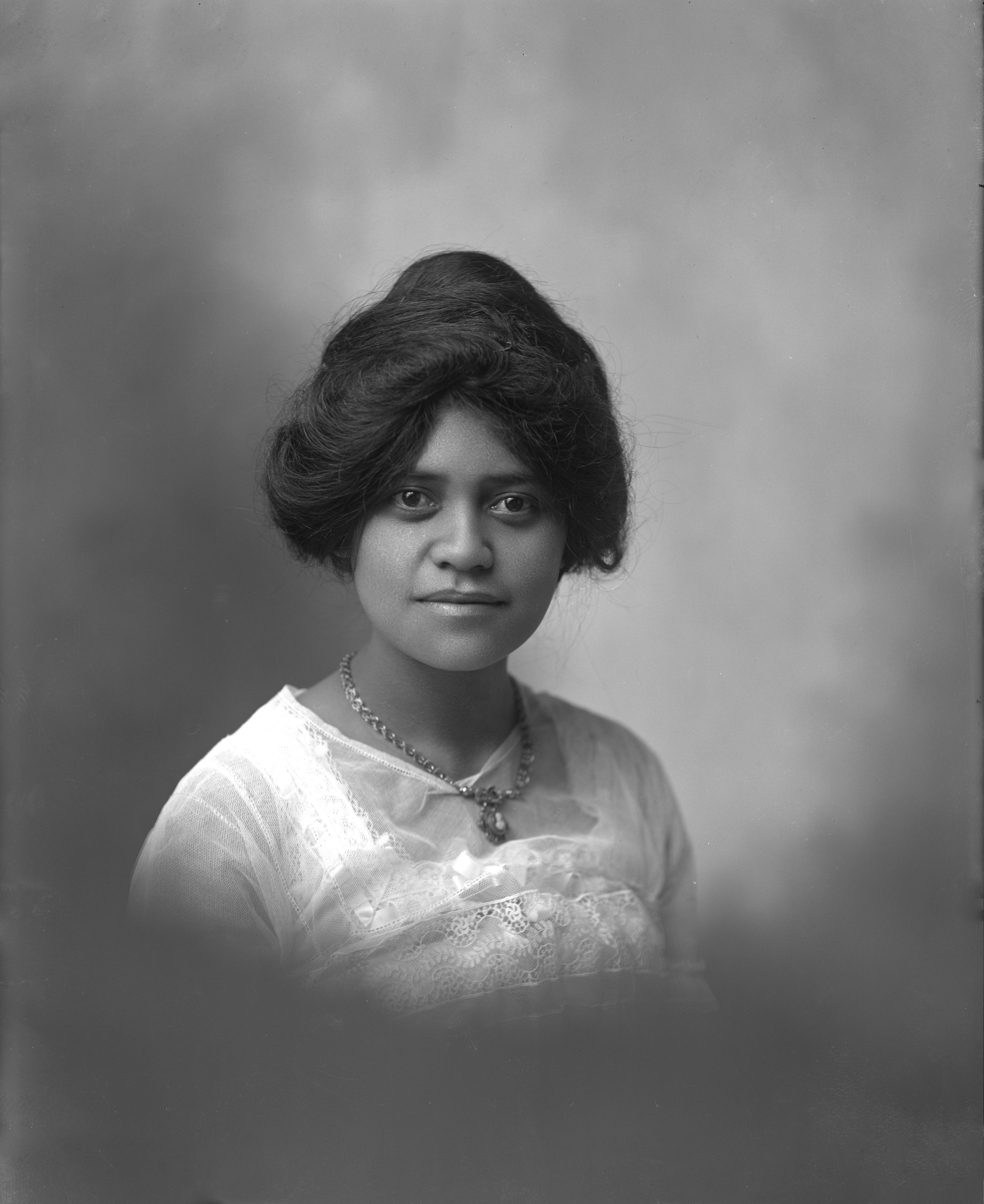
- Hayes in 1914.

Member of the Hawaii Territorial House of Representatives from the 4th district
- In office 1939–1940
- In office 1943–1952

Member of the Hawaii Territorial House of Representatives from the 14th district
- In office 1959–1959

Personal details
- Born: Flora Allen Kaai; April 17, 1893 Hana, Hawaiian Kingdom
- Died: February 3, 1968 (aged 74) Honolulu, Hawaii, U.S.
- Party: Republican
- Spouse: Henry Homer Hayes (m. 1914; died 1957)
- Children: Homer A. Hayes

Flora Kekulalani Kaai Hayes (April 17, 1893 – February 3, 1968) was a Hawaiian-American politician and actor. She served in the Hawaii Territorial House of Representatives for seven terms between 1938 and 1959, representing Oahu as a member of the Hawaii Republican Party. From the 1920s through the early 1930s, Hayes became involved in various Hawaiian organizations. In 1936, she was elected president of the Territory of Hawaii's parent–teacher association (PTA), serving two terms. At the request of John Ford, she stopped in Hollywood while traveling back from a PTA conference in Virginia to play a minor role in the 1937 film The Hurricane.

Hayes first secured a seat as a Territorial Representative in the 1938 election. She served seven terms in the Territorial House of Representatives between 1938 and 1959, in addition to campaigning unsuccessfully to succeed Thelma Akana Harrison in the Territorial Senate in 1952. While in the legislature, she focused on legislation related to schools, parks, and playgrounds. She served as a delegate to the Hawaii Constitutional Convention of 1950, where she ensured that certain areas of land were reserved for Native Hawaiians in the drafted state constitution.

After leaving the legislature, Hayes played a role in the 1961 film Blue Hawaii. Beginning around 1963, she volunteered at Bishop Museum, where she worked with Annie Kanahele to translate letters and documents from Hawaiian to English. She was a candidate for the Hawaii Constitutional Convention of 1968, but died at age 74 in 1968, before the election for delegates was held.

== Early life ==
Flora Kaai Hayes was born Flora Allen Kaai on April 17, 1893, in Hana, Hawaii. Her father Samuel Webster Kaai, a descendant of Kaʻiana, was a politician and the district judge of Hana. Her mother, Katherine Kahumu Kaai, was a descendant of Keōua. She was the second of her parents' sixteen children and their first daughter. In accordance with Hawaiian tradition, she was sent to live with her maternal grandparents as a child; they lived at Kaupo in a grass hut. Only the Hawaiian language was spoken in her grandparents' home. When she was three years old, she was given a horse; she would later become a proficient equestrian.

After Hayes' grandfather died when she was five years old, she went to live with her immediate family, then living in Kona for her father's health. The family lived on land Kamehameha III gave Hayes' paternal great-great-grandfather during the Great Māhele. During the summers, Liliʻuokalani and her retinue visited the family at their property. Hayes went to public school in Kona, and subsequently attended Kamehameha School for Girls at age 11 and graduating in 1913. While at Kamehameha School, Hayes was punished for her limited skill with the English language and her use of Hawaiian.

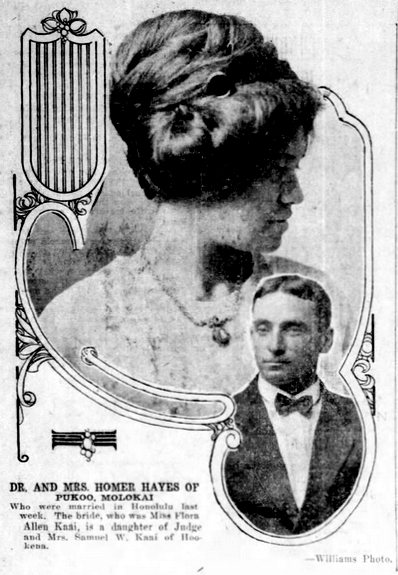
Hayes and her newlywed husband in 1914.

In 1914, Hayes married Henry Homer Hayes, a physician employed by the government and working on Molokai. The wedding took place in Kapālama, after which the couple traveled around Hawaii Island by steamship before settling in Pukoo on Molokai. They moved to Honolulu in 1918 with their young son, after which Hayes audited numerous classes at the University of Hawaiʻi at Mānoa with encouragement from her husband. The Hayes family would care for 29 other children, including a family of six orphans whom they fostered until the children became adults. Hayes later cited the presence of helpful girls at home as a factor in the success of her career.

== Early career ==
In 1922, during a controversy about the perceived immorality of hula, legislation was introduced to outlaw its public performance because of lewdness. Hayes wrote a letter to the editor of The Honolulu Advertiser defending the traditional dance and calling for Hawaiians to support it, so it would not be lost. She argued the real immorality was the "cheek to cheek, bosom to bosom, thigh to thigh dances" seen on passenger steamships and hotel roof gardens. Referring to this letter, a 1978 article in the Advertiser described her as a "Hawaiian activist". The legislation did not pass.

In the 1920s and through the early 1930s, Hayes belonged to various Hawaiian organizations including the Kaʻahumanu Society and the Hawaiian Civic Club. She was a member of the Episcopal Church and represented the Episcopal Diocese of Hawaii at the 1928 National Episcopal Convocation in Washington, D.C., becoming the first Hawaiian delegate to attend.

Hayes was involved with the Territory of Hawaii's parent–teacher association (PTA), becoming its president in 1936 serving two terms in before resigning in 1942. While president of the PTA, she visited every public school in Hawaii and initiated new chapters of the organization, and frequently testified at hearings in the Territorial Legislature. Director John Ford wanted her to play a major role in the 1937 movie The Hurricane, but she was on her way to attend a national PTA convention in Richmond, Virginia. There she gave a presentation about harmony between races in the public schools of Hawaii. Later, however, on her way back to Hawaii she stopped in Hollywood for five weeks and played a minor part in the film as Mama Rua.

== Career in politics ==
Hayes was urged to run for a seat in the Hawaii Territorial Legislature because of her political activity as PTA president. She won a seat in the 4th District of the Territorial House of Representatives as a Republican in the 1938 election. She became the second Oahu woman elected to the Hawaii Territorial Legislature and the first to the Territorial House. She subsequently campaigned for the Territorial Senate in 1940, but despite being endorsed by the Honolulu Star-Bulletin, she was not elected. She campaigned for re-election to her 4th District seat in the Territorial House in 1942. This time, she was elected and held the seat uninterrupted until 1952.

In 1952, after being endorsed by outgoing senator Thelma Akana Harrison, Hayes began a campaign to pursue Harrison's vacated seat in the Territorial Senate . She was not elected to the Senate in the 1952 election; the three available seats from Oahu went to Herbert K. H. Lee, Joe Itagaki, and Ben F. Dillingham. She worked subsequently as the administrative assistant of the Hawaiian Homes Commission. In 1956, she campaigned unsuccessfully again to represent the 4th District in the Territorial House. Hayes retired from her position on the Hawaiian Homes Commission in 1958 and was elected to her seventh term in the Territorial House, representing Pauoa. She was a candidate to represent the same district in the State House of Representatives in 1959, and succeeded in the primary election. Despite this success, she was not elected to the position.

=== Legislative activity ===
Hayes chaired the Education Committee during each term she served in the Territorial House. A supporter of Hawaii statehood, she was appointed to the Hawaii Statehood Commission in 1947; she chaired the Hawaiian Homes Commission in 1949, and was a delegate to the Hawaii Constitutional Convention of 1950. There she ensured a section reserving certain areas of land for Native Hawaiians was included in the drafted state constitution. The draft was adopted officially upon Hawaii's statehood in 1959.

While in the legislature, Hayes focused on legislation related to schools, parks, and playgrounds and welfare and the budget, giving some people the mistaken impression that she was a teacher. The Honolulu Advertiser reported that her proudest political achievement was the passage of legislation that established kindergartens in Hawaii's public schools. She also supported the establishment of a standardized salary system under which public school teachers were paid based on professional experience rather than the grade level they taught, as well as backing a bill that issued a bond of $1,500,000 to pay for land and buildings for public schools over the next 20 years.

== Outside the legislature ==
Hayes served in various positions outside the Hawaii Territorial Legislature, including:

- Alumni association president, Kamehameha Schools
- Hawaiian congregation president, St. Andrew's Cathedral
- National Episcopal Convocation delegate, Episcopal Diocese of Hawaii
- United Thank Offering treasurer, Episcopal Church
- President, Hawaii Congress of Parents and Teachers
- President, Hawaiian Civic Club
- Recreation commission member, City and County of Honolulu
- Welfare board member, City and County of Honolulu
- Member, Native Sons and Daughters of Hawaii
- President, Hawaii State Federation of Women's Republican clubs
- Vice chairperson, World Brotherhood Hawaii chapter

== Later life ==
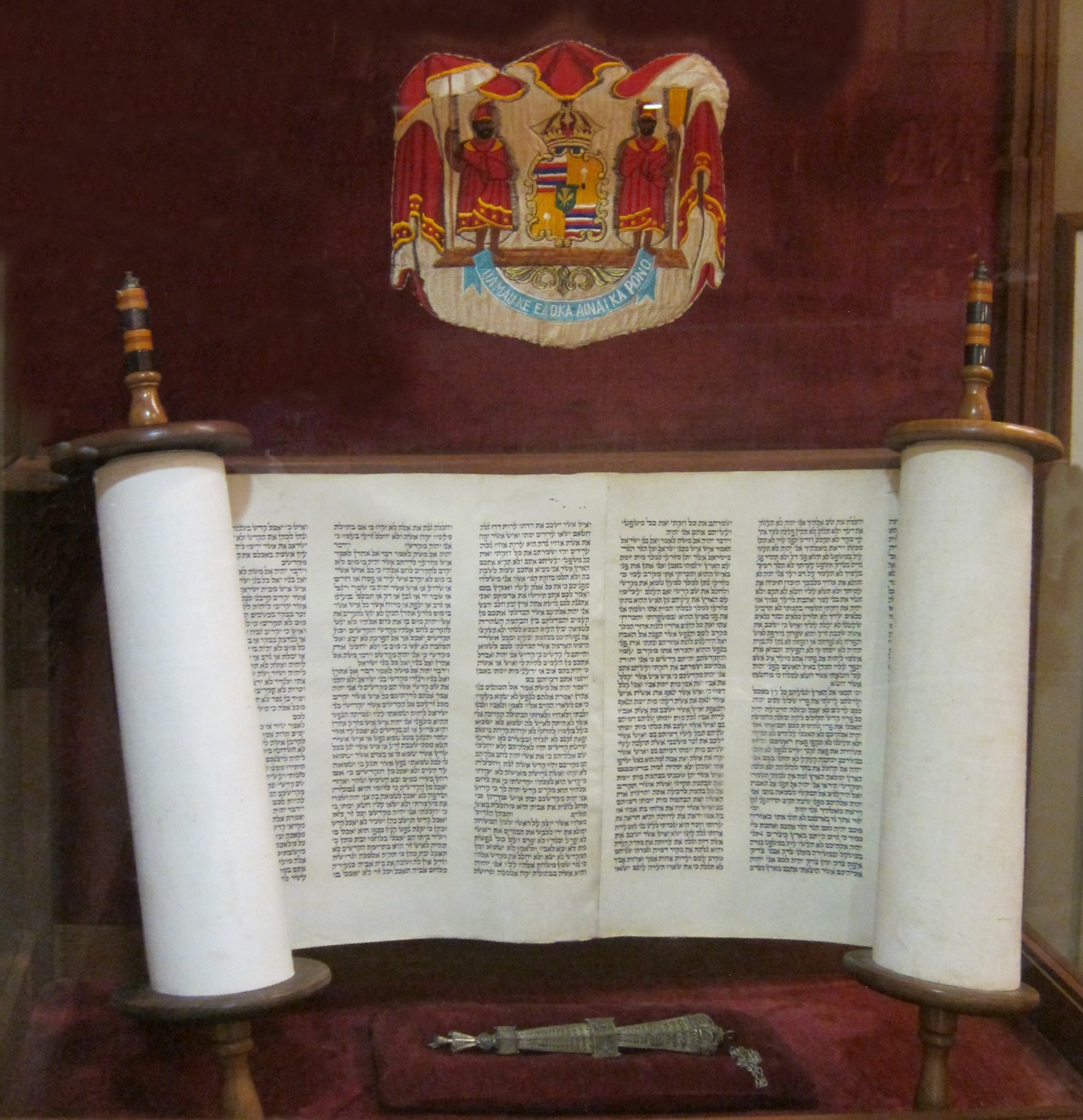
The Kalakaua Torah on display at Temple Emanu-El in 2012.

After the death of Princess Abigail Kawānanakoa in 1945, the Kalakaua Torah was given to Hayes for safekeeping. Following her death in 1968, she left it to her son, Homer A. Hayes. Homer told Temple Emanu-El member Samuel Landau about the scroll in 1972, and it eventually passed into the Temple's ownership.

Hayes was chosen to play a role alongside Elvis Presley in the 1961 film Blue Hawaii. The Honolulu Star-Bulletin described the role of a grandmother as "the meatiest part handed out to Islanders". She was selected for the role after she was recognized by a member of the production staff who had worked on The Hurricane, the 1937 film in which Hayes had also played a role.

Around 1963, Hayes began volunteering with Annie Kanahele as a translator for the Bishop Museum, and they translated letters between aliʻi (hereditary nobility) as well as government documents. Hayes would read the letters aloud in Hawaiian, and Kanahele would transcribe them into English. Hayes received an award in 1965 from the National Society of Arts and Letters in recognition of her translation work.

Hayes announced her candidacy as a delegate for the Hawaii Constitutional Convention of 1968 in December 1967. However, she died on February 3, 1968, at The Queen's Medical Center in Honolulu at age 74 before the election for convention delegates.

== Filmography ==
- The Hurricane (1937), Mama Rua
- Blue Hawaii (1961), Elvis Presley's grandmother-in-law
