= Dee Duponte =

Politician in Hawaii Territorial Legislature

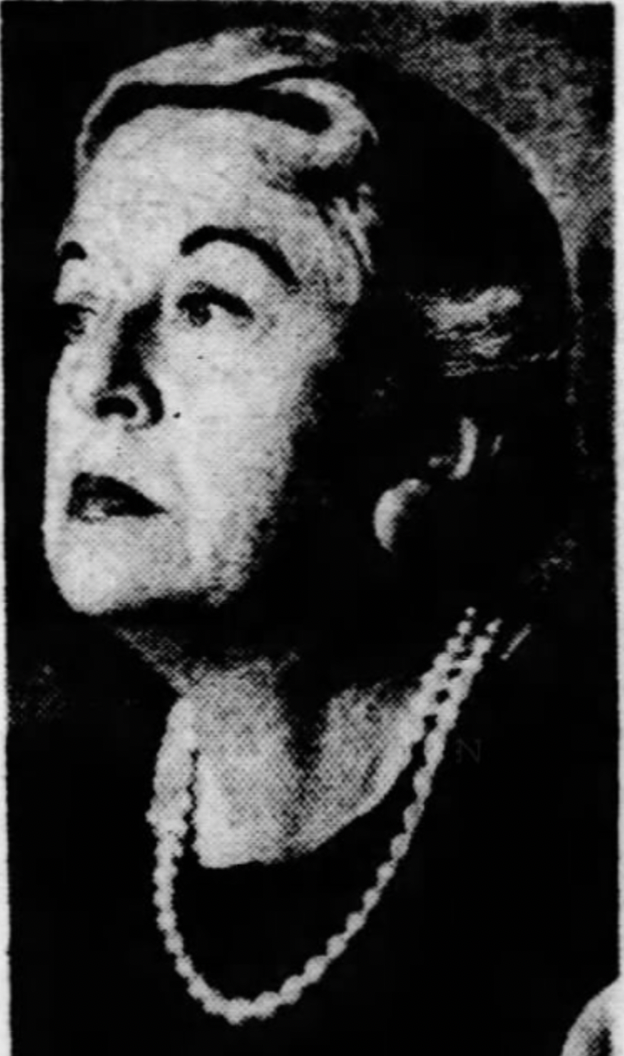

Member of the Hawaii Territorial House of Representatives representing Maui
- In office 1951–1955

Member of the Hawaii Territorial Senate
- In office 1955–1957

Personal details
- Born: Adelia Ashby c. 1908–1909 Augusta, Indiana, U.S.
- Died: April 22, 1971 Maluhia Hospital, Hawaii, U.S.
- Party: Democratic
- Spouse: Harold Duponte (div. 1958)

Adelia Ashby "Dee" Duponte (born Adelia Ashby; c. 1908/1909 – April 22, 1971) was an American politician. She was a Democratic Representative and later Senator for Maui in the Hawaii Territorial Legislature. Her term as Territorial Senator ended in 1957. In 1958, she attempted suicide in her Waikiki apartment and was subsequently hospitalized until her death in 1971.

Born in Augusta, Indiana, Duponte moved to the Territory of Hawaii from Kentucky and held a supervisory position at the Maui Pineapple Company for 14 years. Her 1948 firing made her a household name on Maui after she claimed that it was motivated by her husband's campaign to be County Attorney as a Democrat, and additionally led to an upset election the same year in which the Republicans were widely defeated. In 1950, Duponte was elected to the House of Representatives in the Hawaii Territorial Legislature after beginning her campaign late in the election season. As of 1951, she was the only woman Democrat in the Territorial Legislature. Her political views made her a controversial figure in the Territorial House.

In 1954, Duponte was elected to the Hawaii Territorial Senate. The same year, Duponte moved from Maui to Honolulu, separating from her husband after he had an extramarital affair and fathered a child. Her term in the Hawaii Territorial Senate ended in 1957, and she and her husband were divorced in 1958. On November 20, 1958, she attempted suicide in her Waikiki apartment after discovering that her husband had remarried. She survived a self-inflicted gunshot to her head, and was hospitalized for over a decade before her eventual death, experiencing partial paralysis. She died in April 1971, at the age of 61 or 63.

== Early life and career ==
Duponte was born Adelia Ashby in Augusta, Indiana. She moved to the Territory of Hawaii from Kentucky. In 1937 or 1931, she married Harold Duponte.

After moving to Hawaii, Duponte held a supervisory job at the Maui Pineapple Company for 14 years. In 1948, she was fired; she claimed that the firing was motivated by her support for her husband's campaign to be County Attorney as a Democrat. The company denied her assertions, but they rapidly made her famous on Maui, and additionally led to public resentment of perceived "boss rule" which in turn caused an upset election the same year in which the Republicans were routed.

=== In politics ===
After being fired from the Maui Pineapple Company, Duponte went on to run the headquarters of the Democratic Party of Hawaii in Wailuku, serving as the county-level secretary as well as sitting on the executive committee and chairing the platform and education committees.

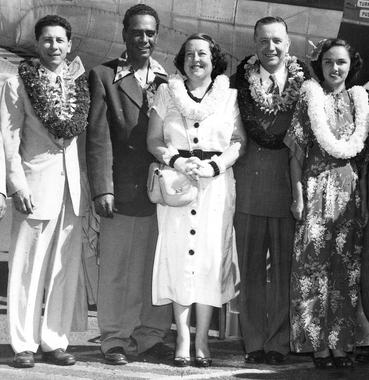
Duponte (center) in 1951 on Maui. Oscar L. Chapman is on her right.

In 1950, Duponte began a campaign to enter the House of Representatives in the Hawaii Territorial Legislature; the campaign started late in the election season and concluded with Duponte's election by a large margin to represent Maui. The Honolulu Star-Bulletin described Duponte in 1951 as a political "newcomer". In 1951, she was the only woman Democrat in the Territorial Legislature, and was chairperson of Maui's Democratic County Committee. While in the Territorial House of Representatives, Duponte became a controversial figure as a result of her opinions about who should be appointed to legislative committees as well as her criticism of conditions at Kalaupapa Settlement. She gained the political support of the International Longshore and Warehouse Union. Duponte served two terms in the Territorial House. She attended the 1952 Democratic National Convention as the National Committeewoman representing Hawaii.

In 1954, Duponte was elected to the Hawaii Territorial Senate. Her political views remained controversial and sometimes led her Democratic colleagues to openly disavow her. The same year, Duponte moved from Maui to Honolulu, separating from her husband Harold Duponte (then a Territorial Representative). Harold Duponte had recently fathered a child in an extramarital affair with another woman.

In 1957, Duponte was working as director of employee training for Hawaiian Pineapple Company in addition to her position in the Territorial Senate. 600 women employees staged a one-day walkout, reportedly in response to difficulties caused by her. The Star-Bulletin reported that Duponte responded to a report of the walkout by saying "Fiddlesticks!"

Duponte's term in the Hawaii Territorial Senate ended in 1957. The following year, she and Harold Duponte were divorced on the advice of a Catholic priest; the couple had been married for 21 years. Testimony in a legal case after Duponte's death regarding her will and testament suggested that the couple had been arguing and had marital issues, but intended to remarry each other within the Catholic Church.

== Later life and death ==
On November 20, 1958, a year after Duponte's term in the Territorial Senate ended and three months after she was divorced from Harold Duponte, she attempted suicide in her apartment in Waikiki by shooting herself in the head. The attempted suicide took place shortly after Harold Duponte married another woman; one of Dee Duponte's neighbors said that she had shut herself into her apartment since learning of the remarriage and seemed to be deeply distressed by it. She was 47 years old at the time of the attempt. After she was discovered lying on her bed dressed in a kimono and holding a pistol registered under her name, an ambulance rushed her to Queen's Hospital.

After the suicide attempt, Duponte was hospitalized for over a decade before her eventual death. She was initially in a coma for several weeks. In January 1959, the Star-Bulletin reported that she had come out of the coma, and that on January 10 she had spoken for the first time since entering it in response to a doctor routinely asking whether she recognized him; she answered with his name and said that she was tired of eating Jello, asking for ice cream instead. According to Duponte's doctor at the time, her cognition was not damaged by the gunshot wound in her brain, but she was largely paralyzed and could only move one arm slightly.

In September 1959 the Star-Bulletin reported that Duponte had been transferred from Queen's Hospital to Maluhia Hospital and was awake, alert, and able to feed herself; she remained unable to walk and was paralyzed on her left side and partially paralyzed on her right. She was allowed to leave the hospital for short periods. Doctors reported that she seemed unaware of her suicide attempt as a result of amnesia or enforced amnesia, and that she had been told that she had experienced a stroke. She would be confined in the hospital for more than 12 years.

Duponte died of a heart attack at the age of 61 or 63 on April 22, 1971 at Maluhia Hospital. A Funeral Mass was held for her at St Anthony's Church in Wailuku, and her body was buried in a family plot at Kuau Cemetery.
