= Kazuhisa Abe =

American judge (1914–1996)

Kazuhisa Abe (Japanese: 阿部 一久, January 18, 1914 – May 18, 1996) was a Democratic state senator and justice of the Supreme Court of Hawaii.

== Early life and education ==
Abe was born in Pepeekeo, Hawaii on January 18, 1914, to Japanese immigrants who came to work on Hawaii's sugar plantations. He was a Buddhist. Abe attended Hilo High School and graduated from the University of Hawaii in 1936. He then studied law at the University of Michigan. After graduating in 1939, he returned to Hilo and married Haruko Murakami. They had two sons.

== Career ==
In 1940 Abe became a magistrate at the district court in Kohala. In 1951, he was elected to the Territorial Senate. He was named the chairman of the Ways and Means Committee in 1955, then became the chair of the Senate Judiciary Committee in 1959. He was elected as president of the Senate in 1964. Abe maintained a law office in Hilo throughout his career as a senator, and had several business interests, including being the president of several companies.

In 1967, after turning down a position as lieutenant governor, Abe was appointed to the Supreme Court of Hawaii by Governor John Burns. He authored 317 opinions. Abe retired on December 28, 1973.

Abe died on May 18, 1996.

Political offices
Preceded by Charles E. Cassidy	Justice of the Supreme Court of Hawaii; 1967–December 28, 1973	Succeeded by Thomas Shoichi Ogata
