= O. Vincent Esposito =

American lawyer and businessman

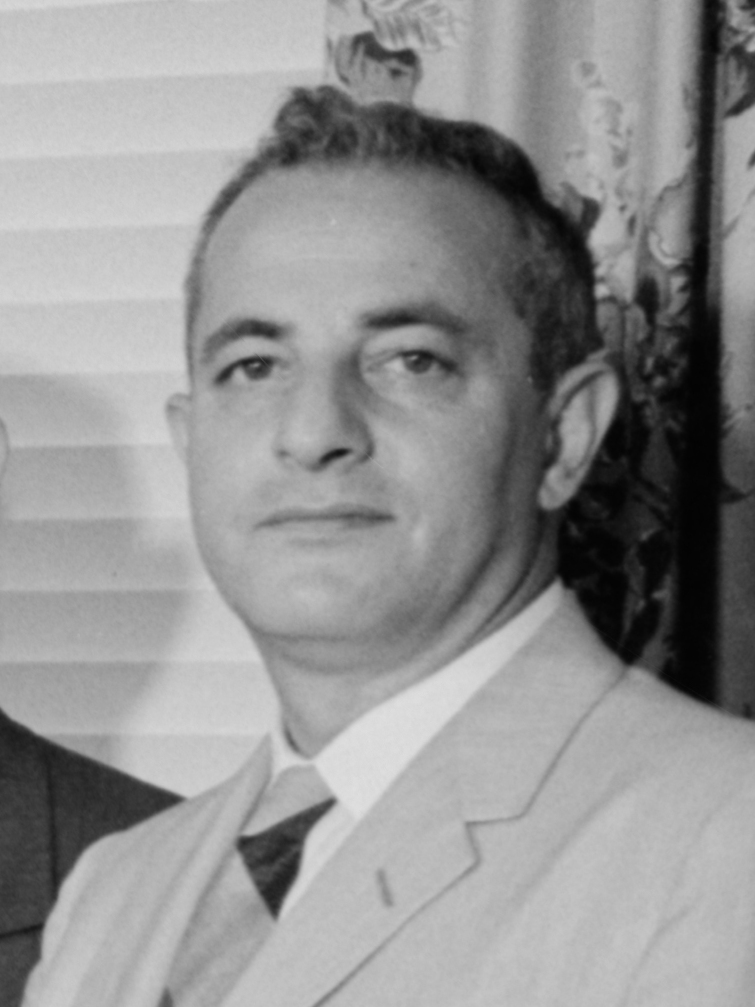
- Esposito in 1958

Speaker of the Hawaii House of Representatives
- In office February 20, 1957 – 1958
- Preceded by: Charles E. Kauhane
- Succeeded by: Elmer Cravalho

Member of the Hawaii House of Representatives from the 5th district
- In office February 21, 1951 – August 21, 1959

Member of the Hawaii Senate from the 5th district
- In office August 21, 1959 – January 3, 1967

Personal details
- Born: October 12, 1914 New Haven, Connecticut, U.S.
- Died: April 15, 1981 (aged 66)

O. Vincent Esposito (October 12, 1914 – April 15, 1981) was an American lawyer and businessman.

Born in New Haven, Connecticut, Esposito moved with his family to Hawaii Territory when he was young. Esposito earned his bachelor's degree from University of Hawaii in 1937 and his law degree from Harvard Law School in 1941. He practiced law in Hawaii. Esposito served in the United States military during World War II as an agent in counterespionage. He was the chief prosecutor for the War Crime Commission and served as an attorney with the Allied Supreme command of the Pacific. Esposito was also the deputy attorney for the City and County of Honolulu, Hawaii. From 1950 to 1958, Esposito served in the Hawaii Territorial House of Representatives and was the territorial house speaker. Esposito was a Democrat. From 1960 until 1966, Esposito served in the Hawaii State Senate.
