= Hōlualoa, Hawaii =

Census-designated place in Hawaii, United States

Hōlualoa
- Census-designated place
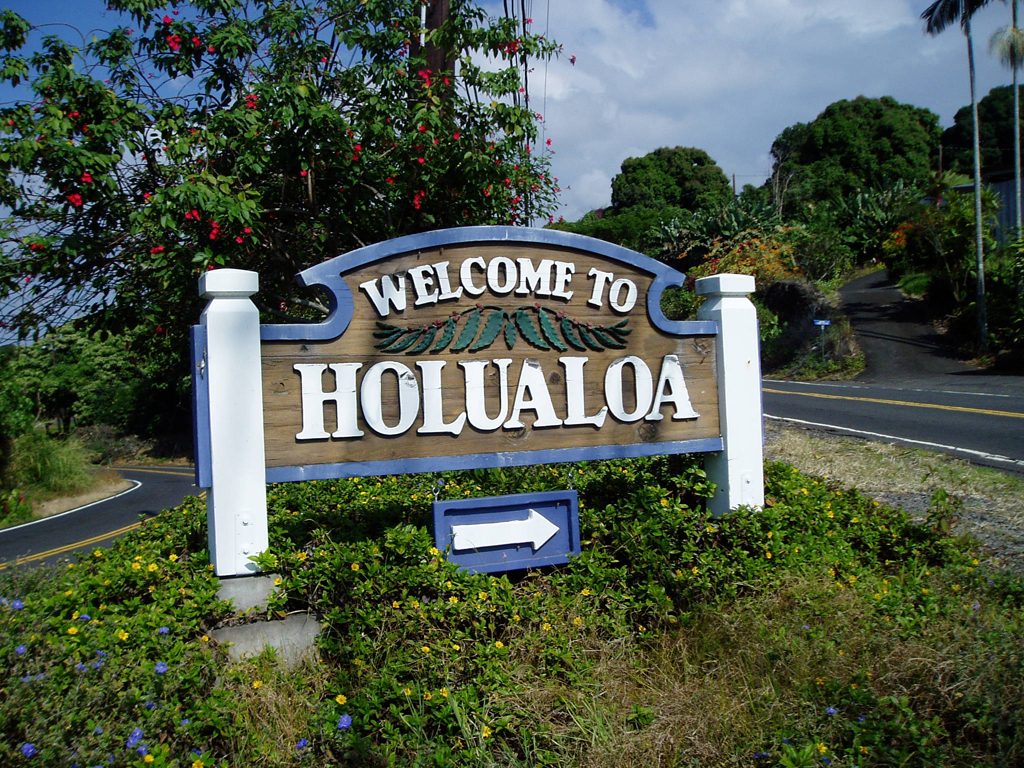

- Location in Hawaii County and the state of Hawaii
- Coordinates: 19°36′53″N 155°58′3″W
- Country: United States
- State: Hawaii
- Counties: Hawaii

Area
  - Total: 35.11 sq mi (90.93 km^{2})
  - Land: 35.10 sq mi (90.92 km^{2})
  - Water: 0.0077 sq mi (0.02 km^{2})
- Elevation: 320 ft (98 m)

Population (2020)
  - Total: 2,994
  - Density: 85.3/sq mi (32.93/km^{2})
- Time zone: UTC-10 (Hawaii-Aleutian)
- ZIP code: 96725
- Area code: 808
- FIPS code: 15-15700
- GNIS feature ID: 359249

Hōlualoa (Hawaiian for 'long sled course') is a census-designated place (CDP) in the North Kona District of Hawaii County, Hawaii, United States. The population was 8,538 at the 2010 census, up from 6,107 at the 2000 census.

Hōlualoa's boundaries were altered significantly for the 2020 census. The western portion of the CDP near the coast became part of the neighboring Kailua-Kona CDP, while the eastern portion of Kailua-Kona became part of Hōlualoa. This reduced Holualoa's population to 2,994.

Harold Sakata, best known for his portrayal of the villain Oddjob in the 1964 James Bond film Goldfinger, was born here in 1920 as Toshiyuki Sakata. Sakata was also a medalist at the 1948 Summer Olympics for America

== Geography ==
Hōlualoa is located on the west side of the island of Hawaii at 19°36′59″N 155°58′06″W. It is bordered by Kailua to the north, Honalo and Kahaluu-Keauhou to the south, and the Pacific Ocean to the west. Hawaii Route 11 is the main highway through the community, running north–south, and Hawaii Route 180 runs parallel to it farther inland.

According to the United States Census Bureau, the CDP has a total area of 14.4 square miles (37.2 km^{2}), of which 13.2 square miles (34.2 km^{2}) are land and 1.2 square miles (3.0 km^{2}), or 7.99%, are water.

== Demographics ==
Historical population
Census	Pop.	Note	%±
2020	2,994		—
U.S. Decennial Census

As of the census of 2000, there were 6,107 people, 2,383 households, and 1,560 families residing in the CDP. The population density was 431.6 inhabitants per square mile (166.6/km^{2}). There were 3,330 housing units at an average density of 235.3 per square mile (90.8/km^{2}). The racial makeup of the CDP was 55.51% White, 0.59% African American, 0.54% Native American, 17.11% Asian, 7.63% Pacific Islander, 1.49% from other races, and 17.13% from two or more races. Hispanic or Latino of any race were 7.35% of the population.

There were 2,383 households, out of which 26.5% had children under the age of 18 living with them, 51.9% were married couples living together, 8.9% had a female householder with no husband present, and 34.5% were non-families. 23.8% of all households were made up of individuals, and 6.4% had someone living alone who was 65 years of age or older. The average household size was 2.56 and the average family size was 3.01.

In the CDP the population was spread out, with 21.4% under the age of 18, 6.2% from 18 to 24, 27.6% from 25 to 44, 31.8% from 45 to 64, and 13.0% who were 65 years of age or older. The median age was 42 years. For every 100 females, there were 102.6 males. For every 100 females age 18 and over, there were 100.2 males.

The median income for a household in the CDP was $50,492, and the median income for a family was $52,193. Males had a median income of $37,461 versus $27,733 for females. The per capita income for the CDP was $25,222. About 3.4% of families and 7.8% of the population were below the poverty line, including 7.2% of those under age 18 and 8.9% of those age 65 or over.

== Education ==
The Hawaii Department of Education operates public schools. Hōlualoa Elementary School, a district public school, is in the CDP. One charter school, Innovations PCS, is in the CDP.
