= Thelma Akana Harrison =

Oahu Senator in Hawaii Territorial Legislature

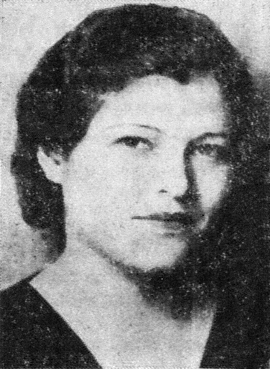
- Thelma Akana in 1936

Member of the Hawaii Territorial Senate from the Oahu district
- In office 1944–1952
- Preceded by: David Y. K. Akana

Personal details
- Born: Thelma Alice Kalaokona Moore; July 17, 1905 Honolulu, Territory of Hawaii
- Died: July 1, 1972 (aged 66) St. Louis, Missouri, U.S.
- Party: Republican
- Spouse(s): David Y. K. Akana (m. 1927; died 1943) Dutch Harrison (m. 1950)
- Education: University of California; Columbia University
- Occupation: Public health nurse

Thelma Alice Kalaokona Moore Akana Harrison (née Moore; July 17, 1905 – July 1, 1972) was an American public health nurse and politician who served as a Republican Senator for Oahu in the Hawaii Territorial Legislature. She was the first woman to be reelected to the Territorial Senate.

Harrison was a boarding student at St. Andrew's Priory School through twelfth grade, where she swam and played basketball and tennis. She subsequently attended St. Luke's School of Nursing in San Francisco before enrolling in a public health nursing program at the University of California, which ended in December 1926. In 1927, Harrison married David Y. K. Akana.

Harrison worked as a nurse and a public health administrator until Akana's death in 1943, when she took over his position as manager of a funeral home company. In 1944, she publicly explored the idea of campaigning to succeed her husband in the Hawaii Territorial Senate, eventually announcing her candidacy in August of that year. Elected to the Territorial Senate in 1944 and reelected in 1948, Harrison chaired multiple committees and was a supporter of Hawaii statehood. She married professional golfer Dutch Harrison in 1950 and announced in 1951 that she would not seek reelection, later moving to the contiguous United States. She died at age 66 in St. Louis, Missouri in July 1972.

== Early life and education ==
Thelma Alice Kalaokona Moore was born in Honolulu, Hawaii on July 17, 1905. She had two younger sisters. All three siblings were boarding students at St. Andrew's Priory School from first through twelfth grades, and spent the summers at the Anglican church cottage in Kāhala. While at St. Andrew's, Harrison was an athlete, playing basketball and tennis as well as swimming; she also sang in the choir and played the violin.

With assistance from Olivia Mary of the Episcopal Sisters of Transfiguration, Harrison was admitted to St. Luke's School of Nursing in San Francisco, where she founded and edited the school's yearbook and was president of her class. After graduating from St. Luke's in January 1926, she enrolled in a public health nursing program at the University of California, which ended in December of the same year.

On December 4, 1927, Harrison married David Y. K. Akana, who would go on to become a Territorial Senator. The couple had four children. Harrison studied public health nursing, supervision, and administration at Columbia University in 1932-33 with a scholarship from the Hawaiian Foundation.

== Career ==
Harrison was a graduate nurse by trade. In 1927, she began her first job, working briefly as the public health nurse for Molokai before she was transferred to Honolulu. She was elected as president of the Nurses' Association of Hawaii in 1936. She held various positions on the Hawaii Territorial Board of Health, including chest clinic supervisor, field supervisor, chief of public health nursing, and administrative assistant, before resigning from the Board in 1939.

In November 1941, Harrison prepared a resolution in her capacity as vice president of the Hawaiian Civic Club, asking the club to oppose the imposition of martial law in Hawaii. She was re-elected president of the Nurses' Association in 1942, serving seven years overall from 1937 to 1944. While president, she was part of a group that planned and fundraised for an office building for nurses; the Mabel Smyth Memorial Building was dedicated on January 4, 1941.

After her first husband, Senator Akana, died of a heart attack on April 16, 1943, Harrison took his position as manager of Nuuanu Funeral Parlors. In January 1944,The Honolulu Advertiser reported that she was "being urged" to run for Territorial Senate as a Republican, having previously assisted her husband with the political campaign that led to his election. The same month, she told the Honolulu Star-Bulletin that she "[had] not said no, and [had] not said yes" to pursuing her husband's Senate seat, and that she would decide based on whether she would still be able to run her business and support her children. At the end of May 1944, the Hawaii Tribune-Herald reported that "[it seemed] an open question as to whether Mrs. Thelma Akana [would] seek election to the seat formerly held by her husband". In June, she visited the United States Capitol to discuss health conditions in the Territory of Hawaii, and subsequently attended the Republican National Convention as an alternate delegate.

In August 1944, Harrison announced her candidacy for the Territorial Senate as a Republican. On November 3, she was publicly endorsed by Democratic Senator Alice Kamokilaikawai Campbell, and responded by thanking Campbell while also criticizing her for remarks she had made which disparaged Japanese Americans. On November 8, she was elected with 25,472 votes.

=== In the legislature ===
Initially elected in 1944 to succeed her husband Senator Akana, and reelected in 1948, Harrison was the first woman to be reelected to the Hawaii Territorial Senate, and was the only woman to serve in the 1949 Senate. She was one of two women senators in the 1951 Hawaii Territorial Legislature, with the other being Mary K. Robinson.

Harrison chaired the public health committee from 1945 to 1951, was chair of the rules committee and vice chair of the education committee in 1949, and served as vice president of the Territorial Senate in 1947 and 1951. She additionally served as a member of the finance, education, and Oahu County committees in 1945 and 1947. She supported Hawaii statehood, and was sent to Washington, D.C. in 1947 to testify in statehood hearings at the United States Congress.

Harrison announced her retirement from the legislature at the end of the last Senate session of 1951, in a speech to her colleagues which implied that her marriage to professional golfer Dutch Harrison was the reason for her decision not to seek reelection. She was applauded by both her Republican and Democratic colleagues.

== Later life ==
Harrison married golfer Dutch Harrison on August 18, 1950, in Little Rock, Arkansas, after the two met on a Pan Am flight to Manila earlier that year. The Honolulu Star-Bulletin described her in 1950 as "volatile" and in 1951 as "[a] brilliant, vivacious woman" and "probably one of Hawaii's most colorful political figures today." She moved to the contiguous United States in the 1950s, and died on July 1, 1972, at the age of 66, in St. Louis.

== Works cited ==
- Chang, Rosie K. (1984). "HARRISON, Thelma Alice Kalaokona Moore Akana". In Peterson, Barbara Bennett (ed.). Notable Women of Hawaii. Honolulu: University of Hawaii Press. pp. 144–147. ISBN 0-8248-0820-7. OCLC 11030010.
