= Hakalau, Hawaii =

Unincorporated community in Hawaii, U.S.

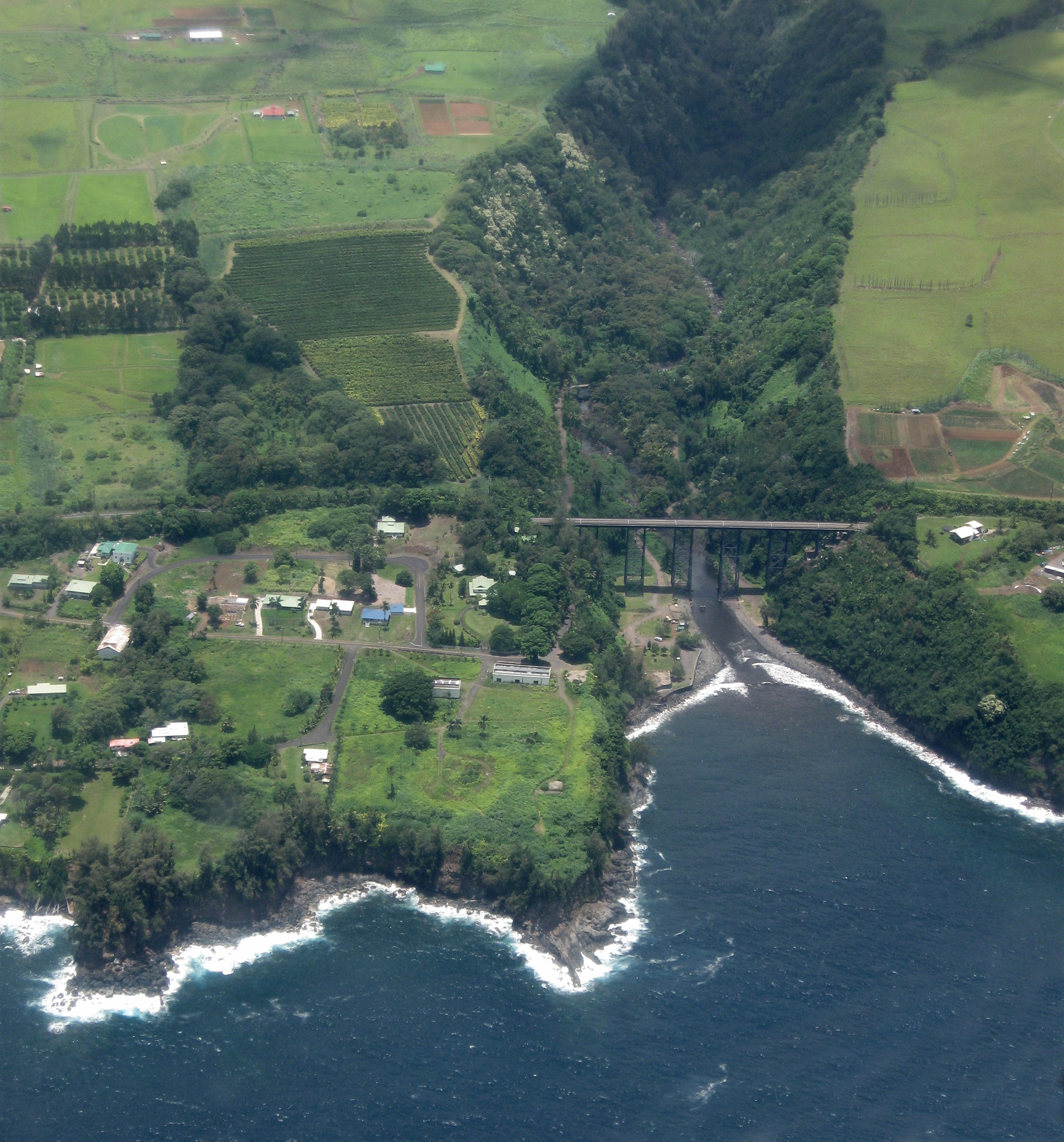
Hakalau Stream and Bay

Hakalau is a small unincorporated community located along the Hamakua coast about 15 miles (24 km) north of Hilo on the Big Island of Hawaii in the U.S. state of Hawaii at 19°53′49″N 155°7′35″W.

The Hakalau Stream flows from the slopes of Mauna Kea, in the area of 19°48′55″N 155°21′55″W and flows into the Pacific Ocean.

Hakalau was once a thriving, multiethnic sugarcane plantation town up until the early 1960s when the plantation originally called Hakalau Plantation Company began to decline. In 1963 it was merged into the Pepeʻekeo Sugar Company, in 1973 merged into the Mauna Kea Sugar Company, and the mill shut down in 1974.

Small family farms grow tropical fruits, taro, flowers, coffee, or cattle. Some historic sites remain from the plantation era. The privately owned sugar plantation manager's home, built in the early 20th century, still exists, along with two warehouses built in 1920 and an old theater, operating as the Hakalau post office, postal code 96710. Located just below the ocean cliff where the Hakalau stream meets the bay, the old sugar mill ruins are still visible.

During the 19th century the Hakalau Bay was used to transfer goods and passengers from smaller boats to larger ships. Today, the bay is used mostly by local surfers and fishermen. Hakalau now has a small, day use, county owned park with picnic tables and ocean access for recreational use, located at the bottom of the Hakalau gulch.

The Hakalau Forest National Wildlife Refuge protects 32,733 acres (132.47 km^{2}), located on the Mauna Kea slopes above the town.

Located nearby is the World Botanical Gardens (WBGI).

== Origins and early history of Hakalau ==
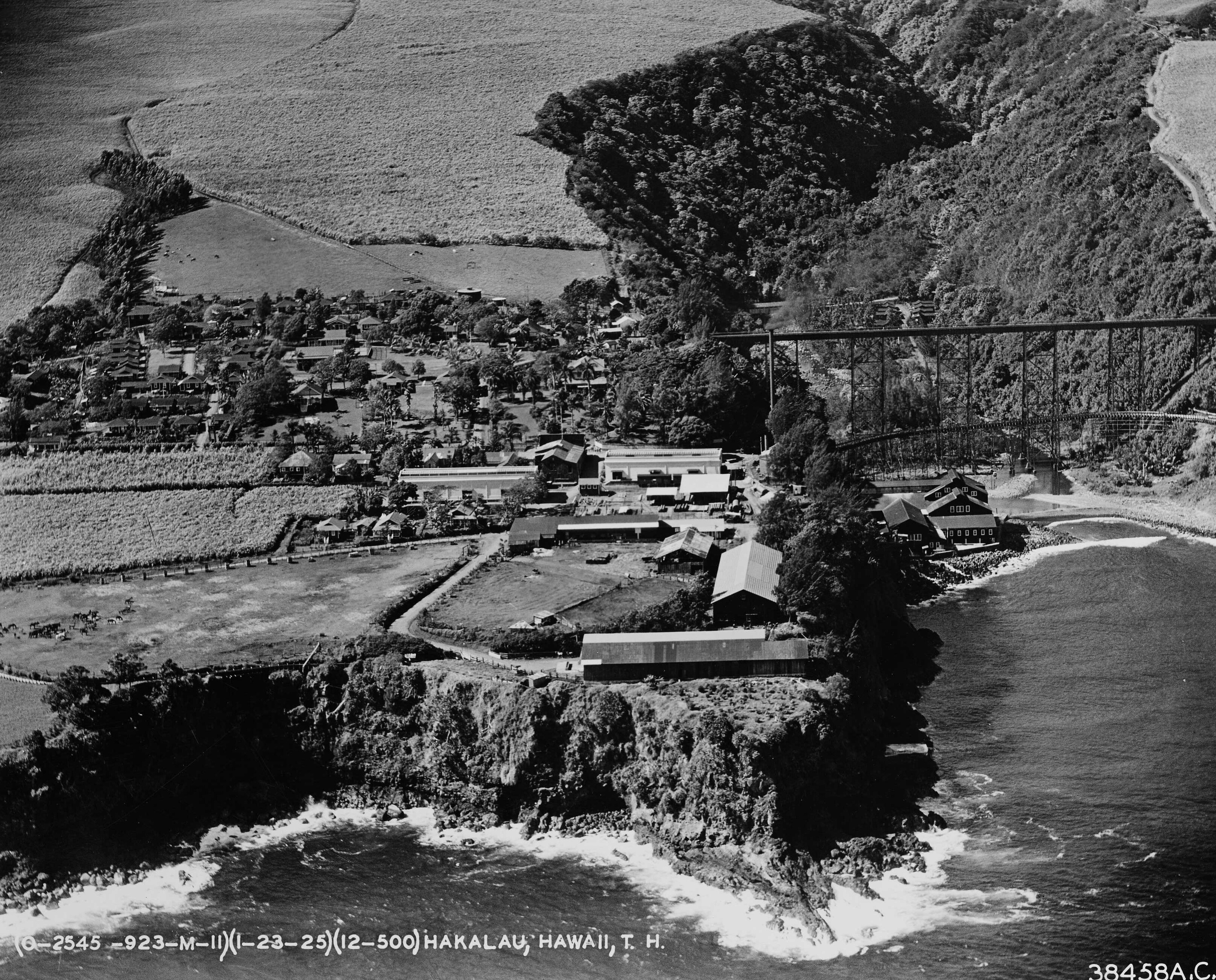
Hakalau, Jan 1925

Until Captain Cook made contact with Hawaiʻi (1778) the islands were inhabited by Native Hawaiians. The place-name traces to a couple of possible origins, the leading meaning is thought today to be a literal one, "many [bird] perches."

After 1778, as with most of Hawaii, people from China and elsewhere came to the Hawaiian Islands. The initial Chinese immigrants to Hawaii Island were Punti and landed at Kohala on Hawaii Island. One immigrant in particular, Lau Sung Iu, was Hakka ("the guest people" of China) and came to Hawaii Island in this manner. He was ethnic northern Chinese, tall for his people at around 6 feet (180 cm). In China, he was an officer in the Chinese army, involved in one of the many conflicts involving the Qing Dynasty. He and another were smuggling powder across the Yalu River when they were discovered. He was shot and wounded but succeeded in escaping by hiding among the reeds in the river. He was later picked up by an American ship and did odd jobs aboard the vessel for passage. He made his way to Hawaii via Hong Kong. Being Hakka and tall, he attracted attention among the shorter and linguistically different Punti, who had also immigrated to Hawaii Island. He later became a merchant and opened a store outside of Hilo along the Hamakua Coast. The area where the store was located became a gathering or stopping point along the Hamakua Coast for travelers. The store, and later the area, became known as Hakalau, named after the tall Hakka proprietor and his actual name of Lau Sung Iu, owner of the general store. Thus, the name Hakalau.

== See also ==
- List of places in Hawaii
