= Steere Noda =

Japanese American politician, lawyer and baseball player

Gikaku Steere Noda (Noda Gikaku (野田儀角) 1892 – March 29, 1986) was a Japanese American politician, lawyer, and baseball player in the State of Hawaii.

== Early life ==
Noda was born in 1892 at the Ewa plantation to Esaki and Suma Noda, immigrants from Kumamoto, Japan. In 1905, six years after Takie Okumura started the first Japanese baseball team in Hawaii in 1899, Noda founded the Asahi Nisei Baseball Team. The team would later grow to become the Americans of Japanese Ancestry (AJA) baseball league. At 13 years old, he was the first baseman, captain, and general manager for the team. He graduated from Mid-Pacific Institute and Hawaii High School (a Japanese language school) in 1911. He married Alice Sae Teshima in 1912. He served in the Hawaii National Guard from 1916 to 1917.

== Career ==
In 1912, Noda started working for the IRS, making him the first nisei to work in Hawaii's federal government. He later became the first nisei to work in Hawaii's judicial system when he obtained a position as a clerk for the Honolulu District Court in 1916. In 1924, he was licensed as an attorney.

During his time as an attorney Noda also worked as a sports promoter for amateur and professional athletes from the mainland United States, Japan, and the Philippines.

Noda served as member of Territorial House of Representatives from 1948 to 1958 and was a delegate to the 1950 Hawaii State Constitutional Convention. His time in the House of Representatives ended when he entered the Hawaii State Senate in 1959. During his time in office he focused on helping the working class, and helped to end the 1949 dock strike.

Throughout his life Noda did community service for the Boy Scouts and the Honolulu Japanese Chamber of Commerce, and started the Honolulu chapter of the JACL.

Noda died on March 19, 1986.

== Honors ==
In 1967 Noda received the La Croix De Chevalier Avec Ruban from the International Amateur Wrestling Foundation. He earned the Fifth Class Order of the Rising Sun by the Japanese government in 1968. It was awarded to him for his role in promoting goodwill and friendship between Japan and the United States. In 1970, he was given the National Award by the US Amateur Wrestling Foundation.
