= Noboru Miyake =

Japanese American politician

Noboru Miyake (三宅昇, April 19, 1896–January 12, 1988) was a Japanese American politician in Hawaii.

== Early life and education ==
Miyake was born in Waimea on April 19, 1896. He was the fifth of 10 children, and the son of a Japanese immigrant who had moved to Kauai to work on a sugar plantation. Miyake dropped out of school as a teenager and began working, first on the sugar plantation, then for Waimea Garage and Electric Company. He took correspondence courses in automotive engineering, law, and business management.

== Career ==
Miyake joined the Hawaii National Guard in 1916. During World War I he was stationed at Fort Armstrong and Schofield Barracks. After his discharge from the military, he bough Waimea Garage and Electric Company from William Olin Cromwell and became its president. He won a seat on the Kauai Board of Supervisors in 1930. He was the first Japanese American to hold elected office in Hawaii. He worked to improve Kauai's water system. When World War II started, Miyake chose not to run for a sixth term and instead volunteered for the Army, where he worked for the Office of Civilian Defense.

In 1948, after World War II, Miyake was elected to a seat in the Hawaii Territorial House of Representatives. In 1952 he was elected to the Hawaii Territorial Senate, where he lobbied for the establishment of Kauai Community College. He was elected chairman of the Senate Ways and Means Committee in 1959. He retired in 1966 and died in 1988.
