= Charles E. Kauhane =

American politician

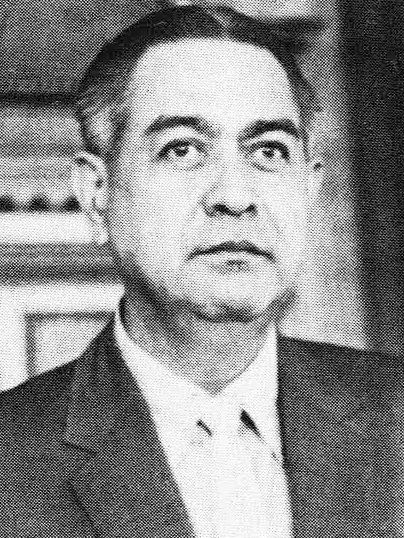
- Kauhane in 1957

Speaker of the Hawaii House of Representatives
- In office August 21, 1959 – 1958
- Preceded by: O. Vincent Esposito
- Succeeded by: Tadao Beppu

Member of the Hawaii House of Representatives from the 5th district
- In office February 7, 1943 – 1967

Personal details
- Born: June 14, 1915 Honolulu, Territory of Hawaii, U.S.
- Died: September 5, 1982 (aged 67)

Charles Ernest Kauhane (June 14, 1905 – September 5, 1982) was an American politician.

Born in Honolulu, Hawaii, Kauhane graduated from St. Louis University. He worked for the sheriff and police departments for the city and county of Honolulu. He also served as a court bailiff. From 1942 to 1956, Kauhane served in the Hawaii Territorial House of Representatives and was a Democrat. In 1955, Kauhane served as speaker of the Hawaii Territorial House of Representatives. He also served in the Hawaii Constitutional Convention of 1950. In 1959, Kauhane served in the Hawaii House of Representatives and was the majority floor leader. He also served in the Hawaii Constitutional Convention of 1968 and joined the Republican Party.
