= Esther K. Richardson =

Representative in Hawaii Territorial House (1901–1963)

Esther Kaleimomi Kaiuwailani Kaoao Richardson (January 17, 1901 – March 18, 1963) was a Republican Representative for Hawaii Island in the Hawaii Territorial House of Representatives. In the 1942 election, she was the only woman from Hawaii Island to be elected to public office. The Honolulu Star-Bulletin described her in 1951 as "a slender woman with quiet dignity". Richardson served in the Territorial House of Representatives representing the 2nd district for seven consecutive terms before her retirement in 1957. She was from South Kona, where she ran a lauhala weaving studio.

Richardson was born in Punaluu, Oahu and died in Plymouth, Massachusetts after a heart attack while on a trip to visit her son. She married Arnold Barrister Moliakalanikeola Richardson in 1917. Their son, Barrister Allen Richardson, was the first orthopedic surgeon in Hawaii, who married two-time Olympic swimmer Lillian "Pokey" Watson.
