= Wilfred Tsukiyama =

Chief Justice of the Supreme Court of Hawaii

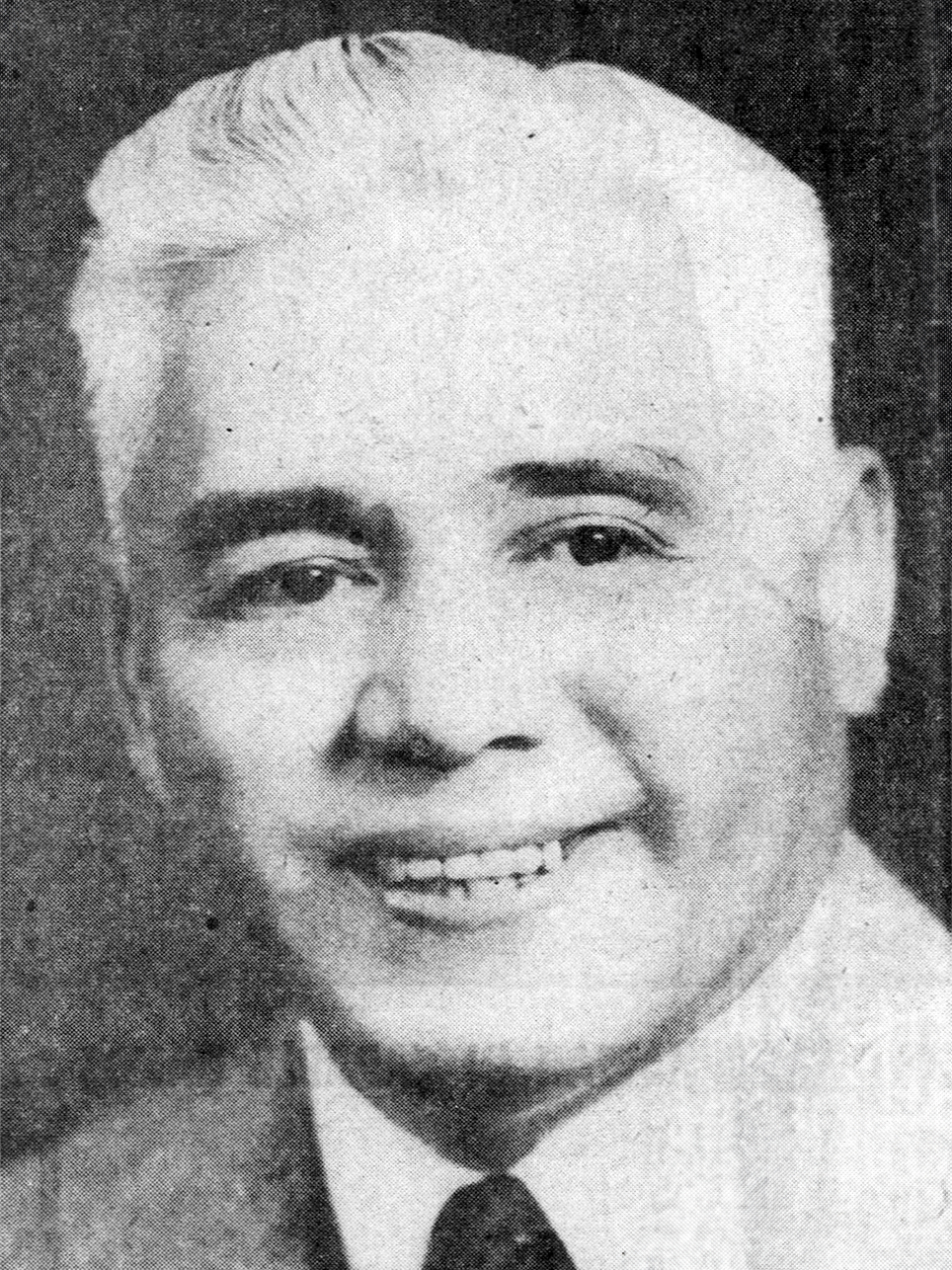

1st Chief Justice of the Supreme Court of Hawaii
- In office October 5, 1959 – December 31, 1965
- Preceded by: Philip L. Rice (Territorial Supreme Court)
- Succeeded by: William S. Richardson

Personal details
- Born: March 22, 1897 Honolulu, Hawaii, U.S.
- Died: January 6, 1966 (aged 68) Honolulu, Hawaii, U.S.
- Party: Republican
- Education: Coe College (BA); University of Chicago (LLB)

Wilfred Chomatsu "Tsuky" Tsukiyama (Japanese: 築山 長松, March 22, 1897 – January 6, 1966) was an attorney, Territorial Senator, and chief justice of the Supreme Court of Hawaii. He was the first Japanese American elected to the Territorial Senate of Hawaii, and the first to serve as a state Supreme Court Justice in the United States.

== Early life ==
Tsukiyama was born in Honolulu, Hawaii on March 22, 1897. His parents, Koken and Hide, were Japanese immigrants who worked on sugar plantations. He graduated from McKinley High School in 1918. After graduation, Tsukiyama served in the United States Army during World War I. When the war ended, he left the army and enrolled in Coe College, where he studied pre-law. He went on to get a J.D. degree from the University of Chicago Law School.

== Career ==
After graduating from law school in 1924, Tsukiyama returned to Hawaii and became an attorney at Huber, Kemp, and Stainback. In 1929, he became Honolulu deputy attorney. He was promoted to City and County attorney in 1933, but returned to private practice in 1940.

During the 1930s Tsukiyama spearheaded a movement to encourage Japanese Americans who had dual citizenship with Japan to renounce their Japanese citizenship. This was because after the sugar strikes during the 1920s, many white Americans were concerned about the loyalty of Japanese immigrants to America, otherwise known as the "Japanese Problem". This reached a fever pitch when Pearl Harbor was attacked and World War II broke out. Tsukiyama volunteered for military service, but he was denied because of his age. Instead, he became active in the Emergency Service Committee.

In 1946 Tsukiyama ran for a seat in the Territorial Senate as a Republican. He was elected Senate president in 1949 and served in that capacity until 1954. He strongly supported Hawaii's statehood, which was enacted in 1959. He ran for the United States Senate that year, but narrowly lost to Oren E. Long. Instead, Governor William F. Quinn appointed him to the Supreme Court of Hawaii.

In September 1963, Tsukiyama was awarded the Order of the Sacred Treasure, 2nd class, by the Emperor of Japan.

Tsukiyama fell ill and resigned from the Supreme Court on December 31, 1965. He died on January 6, 1966, and is buried at the National Memorial Cemetery of the Pacific.

== See also ==
- John F. Aiso - first Japanese American judge in the continental U.S. (1957)
- Herbert Choy - first Asian American U.S. federal judge (1971)
- Masaji Marumoto - first Asian American territorial court justice (1956)
- Benjamin Menor - first Filipino American State Supreme Court justice (1959)
- Kathryn Doi Todd - first female Asian American judge in the U.S. (1978)
- Cyrus Nils Tavares - first Native Hawaiian U.S. federal judge (1960)
- Delbert E. Wong - first Chinese American judge in the continental U.S. (1959)

Party political offices
New seat	Republican nominee for U.S. Senator from Hawaii (Class 3); 1959	Succeeded by Benjamin Dillingham
Legal offices
New seat	Justice of the Hawaii Supreme Court; 1959–1965	Succeeded by William S. Richardson
