= Kapaʻa, Hawaii =

Kapaʻa
- Census-designated place
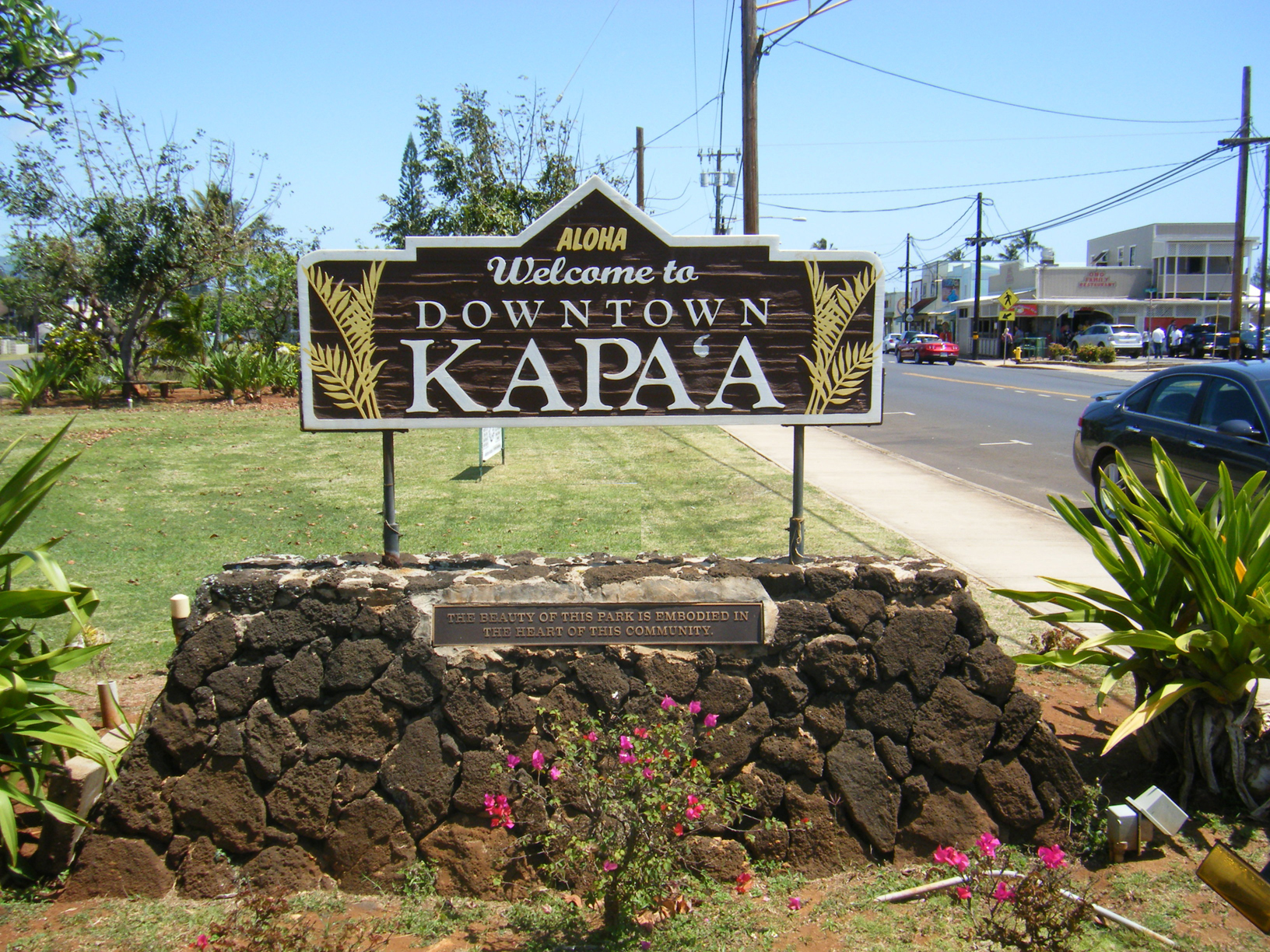

- Location in Kauaʻi County and the state of Hawaiʻi
- Coordinates: 22°5′18″N 159°20′16″W
- Country: United States
- State: Hawaii
- County: Kauaʻi

Area
  - Total: 10.36 sq mi (26.84 km^{2})
  - Land: 10.03 sq mi (25.98 km^{2})
  - Water: 0.33 sq mi (0.86 km^{2})
- Elevation: 20 ft (6 m)

Population (2020)
  - Total: 11,652
  - Density: 1,161.5/sq mi (448.46/km^{2})
- Time zone: UTC-10 (Hawaii-Aleutian)
- ZIP code: 96746
- Area code: 808
- FIPS code: 15-28850
- GNIS feature ID: 0360457

Kapaʻa (Kauaʻi dialect: Tapaʻa) is an unincorporated community and census-designated place (CDP) in Kauaʻi County, Hawaiʻi, United States. It is the most populous town in the island of Kauai, with a population of 11,652 as of the 2020 census, up from 9,471 at the 2000 census.

Kapaʻa is a Hawaiian word meaning "the solid one". It is formed from ka (the) and pa'a (solid). Notable people from Kapaʻa include Lokalia Montgomery.

== Geography ==
Nounou the Sleeping Giant

Kapaʻa is on the east side of Kauaʻi at 22°5′18″N 159°20′16″W (22.088281, -159.337706). It is bordered to the south by the communities of Wailua and Wailua Homesteads and to the east by the Pacific Ocean. Hawaii Route 56 passes through the eastern part of the community, leading north 6 miles (10 km) to Anahola and south 8 miles (13 km) to Lihue.

According to the United States Census Bureau, the Kapaʻa CDP has an area of 10.3 square miles (26.8 km^{2}), of which 10.0 square miles (25.9 km^{2}) is land and 0.35 square miles (0.9 km^{2}) (3.27%) is water.

== Demographics ==
Historical population
| Census | Pop. | Note | %± |
|---|---|---|---|
| 2020 | 11,652 | | — |
U.S. Decennial Census

As of the census of 2000, there were 9,471 people, 3,129 households, and 2,281 families residing in the CDP. The population density was 971.2 inhabitants per square mile (375.0/km^{2}). There were 3,632 housing units at an average density of 372.4 per square mile (143.8/km^{2}). The racial makeup of the CDP was 27.8% White, 0.3% Black, 0.5% Native American, 31.7% Asian, 10.0% Pacific Islander, 1.0% from other races, and 28.7% from two or more races. Hispanic or Latino of any race were 9.5% of the population.

There were 3,129 households, of which 40.6% had children under age 18 living with them, 51.1% were married couples living together, 15.0% had a female householder with no husband present, and 27.1% were non-families. 20.4% of all households were made up of individuals, and 6.2% had someone living alone who was 65 or older. The average household size was 2.99 and the average family size was 3.44.

In the CDP the population was spread out, with 29.8% under 18, 7.8% from 18 to 24, 29.3% from 25 to 44, 22.8% from 45 to 64, and 10.4% who were 65 or older. The median age was 35. For every 100 females, there were 98.2 males. For every 100 females age 18 and over, there were 94.9 males.

The median income for a household in the CDP was $39,448, and the median income for a family was $45,878. Males had a median income of $30,129 versus $25,680 for females. The per capita income was $16,878. About 14.1% of families and 15.7% of the population were below the poverty line, including 18.6% of those under 18 and 12.6% of those 65 or older.

== Education ==
Kapaʻa is served by Kapaʻa High School and a feeder elementary school and middle school.

There is one private school, St. Catherine Catholic School (K-8; online high school program), founded in 1947.

The Hawaii State Public Library System operates the Kapaʻa Public Library. It opened on March 12, 1955.
