= Hawaii Territorial Legislature =

Legislature of the Territory of Hawaii (1900–1959)

- Seal of the Territory of Hawaii

Type
- Type: Bicameral
- Houses: Senate; House of Representatives

History
- Founded: April 30, 1900
- Preceded by: Legislature of the Hawaiian Kingdom
- Succeeded by: Hawaii State Legislature

Structure
- Seats: 76
- Length of term: Senate: 4 years; House: 2 years
- Senators: 25 (15 until February 18, 1959)
- Representatives: 51 (30 until February 18, 1959)

Meeting place
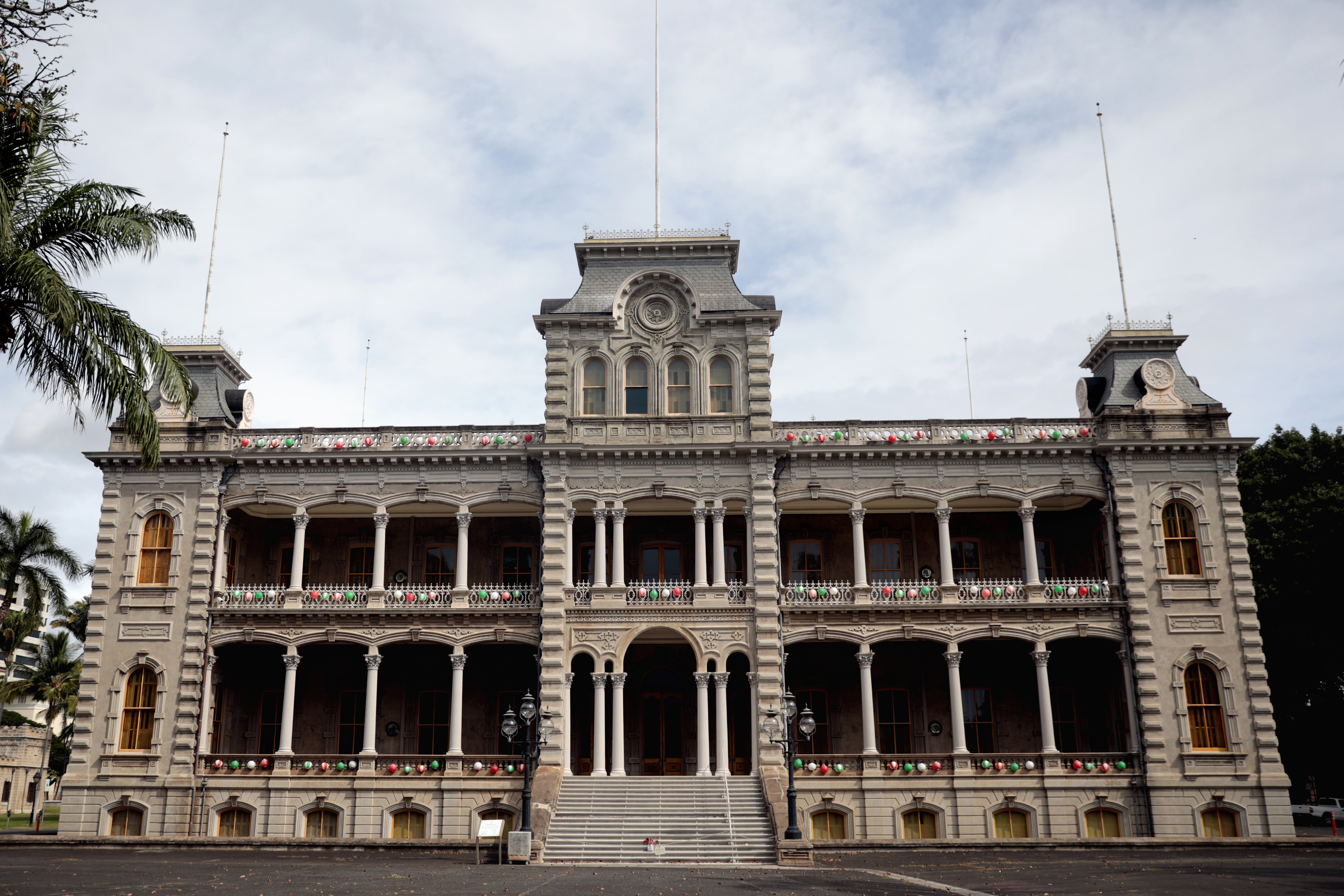
- ʻIolani Palace

The Hawaii Territorial Legislature was the legislative body of the Territory of Hawaii from 1900 to 1959 (when Hawaii became a state).

The Hawaii Territorial Legislature was established on April 30, 1900, by the Hawaiian Organic Act which established the Territory of Hawaii as part of the United States.

== Establishment ==
The Hawaii Territorial Legislature was established on April 30, 1900, by the Hawaiian Organic Act which annexed the Republic of Hawaii into the United States and established it as the Territory of Hawaii. All laws created by the Republic of Hawaii were retained, except for those "inconsistent with the Constitution or laws of the United States" or with the provisions of the Organic Act; various laws of the Republic of Hawaii were explicitly repealed in the text of the Organic Act. The first elections under territorial administration took place on November 6, 1900.

== Makeup and operation ==
The Hawaii Territorial Legislature was a bicameral body comprising a Senate and a House of Representatives. Positions in both chambers were elected. Each had the power to select its own officers and design its procedural rules. A quorum was defined as the majority of the members of a given chamber, and a vote by a quorum was sufficient for "the conduct of ordinary business", but a simple majority was required for the passage of laws.

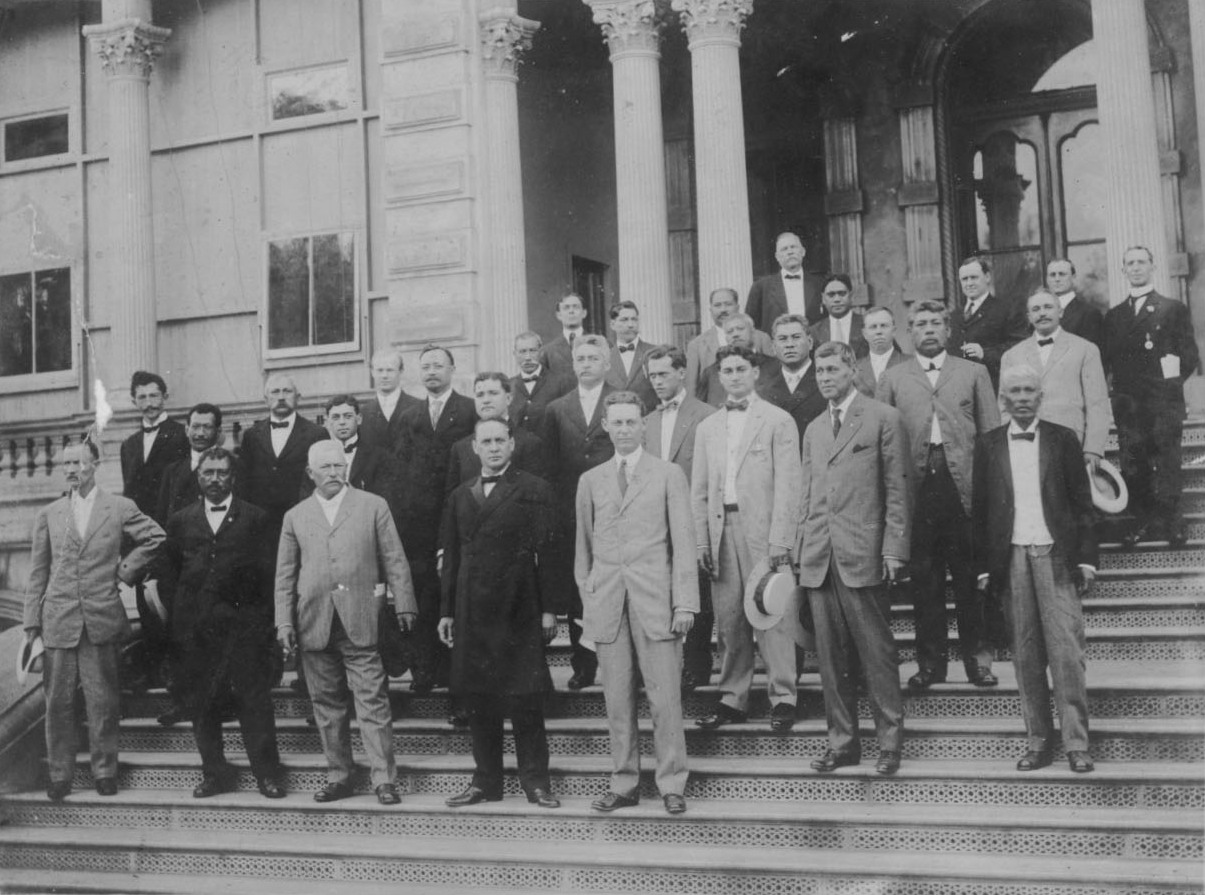
Members of the 1911 House of Representatives

Legislative sessions were required to be held in odd-numbered years, and could be held in even-numbered years at the discretion of the legislature. Those held in even-numbered years, called "budget sessions", were restricted to matters related to the budget, elections, and impeachment of officials. Sessions began on the third Wednesday in February.

The Hawaii Territorial Legislature convened at ʻIolani Palace.

=== Admission of women ===
Very soon after the passage of the Nineteenth Amendment to the United States Constitution in 1920, which allowed women to vote in elections, women began seeking election to the Territorial Legislature. However, the Organic Act required that members of the legislature be male citizens of the United States. In 1922, the United States Congress passed a bill to modify the Organic Act to allow women to hold office. The first woman in the Hawaii Territorial Legislature was Rosalie Keliʻinoi, elected to the Territorial House of Representatives in 1925. Elsie Wilcox became the first woman elected to the Territorial Senate in 1933.

=== Senate ===
The Senate initially consisted of 15 members with four-year terms. Sections 32 and 33 of the Organic Act of 1900 apportioned the senatorial districts as follows:

1. First District – The island of Hawai'i (4 senators).
2. Second District – The islands of Maui, Molokaʻi, Lānaʻi, and Kahoʻolawe (3 senators).
3. Third District – The island of O'ahu (6 senators).
4. Fourth District – The islands of Kaua'i and Ni'ihau (2 senators).

In 1956, the Organic Act was amended to increase the number of senators from 15 to 25 beginning after the 1958 general elections. Sections 32 and 33 of the amended Act apportioned the senatorial districts as follows:

1. First District – That portion of the island of Hawai'i known as Puna, Hilo, and Kamakua (5 senators).
2. Second District – That portion of the island of Hawai'i known as Kaʻū, Kona, and Kohala (2 senators).
3. Third District – The islands of Maui, Molokaʻi, Lānaʻi, and Kahoʻolawe (5 senators).
4. Fourth District - That portion of the island of O'ahu lying east and south of Nuuanu Street and Pali Road and the upper ridge of the Koolau Range from the Nuʻuanu Pali to Makapuu Point and all other islands not specifically enumerated (5 senators).
5. Fifth District - That portion of the island of O'ahu lying west and north of the fourth senatorial district (5 senators).
6. Sixth District - The islands of Kaua'i and Ni'ihau (3 senators).

When a member of the Senate died or resigned, a special election or a general election would be held to appoint a replacement. A senator of the Hawaiian Islands was required to be a citizen of the United States, be at least 30 years old, and have lived in Hawaii for at least three years. The original text, written in 1900, required that a senator "be a male citizen of the United States;" this gender requirement stood until 1922.

=== House of Representatives ===
The House of Representatives initially consisted of 30 members with two-year terms. Sections 38 and 39 of the Organic Act of 1900 apportioned the representative districts as follows:

1. First District – That portion of the island of Hawai'i known as Puna, Hilo, and Kamakua (4 representatives).
2. Second District – That portion of the island of Hawai'i known as Kaʻū, Kona, and Kohala (4 representatives).
3. Third District - The islands of Maui, Molokaʻi, Lānaʻi, and Kahoʻolawe (6 representatives).
4. Fourth District - That portion of the island of O'ahu lying east and south of Nuuanu street and a line drawn in extension thereof from the Nuʻuanu Pali to Mokapu Point (6 representatives).
5. Fifth District - That portion of the island of O'ahu lying west and north of the fourth district (6 representatives).
6. Sixth District - The islands of Kaua'i and Ni'ihau (4 representatives).

In 1956, the Organic Act was amended to increase the number of representatives from 30 to 51 beginning after the 1958 general elections. Sections 38 and 39 of the amended Act apportioned the representative districts as follows:

1. First District – That portion of the island of Hawai'i known as Puna (1 representative).
2. Second District – That portion of the island of Hawai'i known as South Hilo (4 representatives).
3. Third District – That portion of the island of Hawai'i known as North Hilo and Hāmākua (1 representative).
4. Fourth District – That portion of the island of Hawai'i known as Kaʻū and South Kona and that portion of North Kona referred to as Keauhou (1 representative).
5. Fifth District – That portion of the island of Hawai'i known as Kohala and that portion of North Kona not included in the fourth representative district (1 representative).
6. Sixth District – The islands of Molokaʻi and Lānaʻi (1 representative).
7. Seventh District – The islands of Maui and Kahoʻolawe; (5 representatives).
8. Eighth District – That portion of the island of O'ahu known as Koʻolaupoko and Koʻolauloa (2 representatives).
9. Ninth District – That portion of the island of O'ahu known as Waialua and Wahiawa (2 representatives).
10. Tenth District – That portion of the island of O'ahu known as Ewa and Waianae (2 representatives).
11. Eleventh District – That portion of the island of O'ahu referred to as Kalihi (3 representatives).
12. Twelfth District – That portion of the island of O'ahu referred to as Upper Nuʻuanu (3 representatives).
13. Thirteenth District – That portion of the island of O'ahu referred to as Kapālama (3 representatives).
14. Fourteenth District – That portion of the island of O'ahu referred to as Pauoa (5 representatives).
15. Fifteenth District – That portion of the island of O'ahu referred to as Mānoa and Waikīkī (6 representatives).
16. Sixteenth District – That portion of the island of O'ahu referred to as Kaimuki and Kapahulu (4 representatives).
17. Seventeenth District – That portion of the island of O'ahu not included in any other representative district on the island of O'ahu, together with all other islands not included in any other representative district (3 representatives).
18. Eighteenth District – The islands of Kaua'i and Ni'ihau (4 representatives).

Candidates to the House of Representatives were required to be 25 years of age, be a citizen of the United States, and have lived in Hawaii for at least three years. The original text, written in 1900, required that a senator "be a male citizen of the United States;" this gender requirement stood until 1922.

== Disestablishment ==
The Hawaii Territorial Legislature adjourned for the final time on May 2, 1959, when Hawaii became a state and the Hawaii State Legislature therefore became its legislative body.
