= 18th Hawaii Territorial Legislature =

Session of the Hawaii Territorial Legislature

18th Hawaiʻi Territorial Legislature
←	17th	19th	→
- Seal of the Territory of Hawaii

Overview
- Legislative body: Hawaii Territorial Legislature
- Jurisdiction: Territory of Hawaii, United States

Senate
- Members: 15
- President: George P. Cooke
- Vice President: Elsie H. Wilcox

House of Representatives
- Members: 30
- Speaker: Roy A. Vitousek
- Vice Speaker: Manuel Gomes Paschoal

The Eighteenth Legislature of the Territory of Hawaii was a session of the Hawaii Territorial Legislature. The session convened in Honolulu, Hawaii, and ran from February 20 until May 1, 1935.

== Legislative session ==
The session ran from February 20 until May 1, 1935. It passed 217 bills into law.

== Senators ==
↓
10	5
Republican	Democratic

Affiliation	Party (Shading indicates majority caucus)			Total	
Affiliation	Republican	Ind	Democratic	Total	Vacant
End of previous legislature (1933)	11	0	4	15	0
Begin (1935)	10	0	5	15	0
Latest voting share	66.7%	0%	33.3%		

District	Senator	Party	County	Address
1	James Campsie	R	Hawaiʻi	Pāhala
1	William H. Hill	R	Hawaiʻi	Hilo
1	William J. Kimi	R	Hawaiʻi	Hilo
1	Charles H. Silva (Note: Silva was elected on April 15, 1935, to succeed Ernest A.K. Akina, Republican, who was expelled on March 18, 1935)	D	Hawaiʻi	Kapa'au
2	H. A. Baldwin	R	Maui	Makawao
2	George P. Cooke	R	Maui	Kaunakakai (Molokai)
2	Harry H. Holt	R	Maui	Wailuku
3	Joseph R. Farrington	R	Oahu	Honolulu
3	Henry Freitas	D	Oahu	Honolulu
3	William H. Heen	D	Oahu	Honolulu
3	Lester Petrie	D	Oahu	Honolulu
3	Joseph L. Sylva	R	Oahu	Honolulu
3	David K. Trask	D	Oahu	Honolulu
4	Charles A. Rice	R	Kauaʻi	Līhuʻe
4	Elsie H. Wilcox	R	Kauaʻi	Līhuʻe

== House of Representatives ==
↓
23	7
Republican	Democratic

Affiliation	Party (Shading indicates majority caucus)			Total	
Affiliation	Republican	Ind	Democratic	Total	Vacant
End of previous legislature (1933)	20	0	10	30	0
Begin (1935)	23	0	7	30	0
Latest voting share	76.7%		23.3%		

District	Representative	Party	County	Address
1	Herbert N. Ahuna	R	Hawaiʻi	Hilo
1	James D. Kealoha	D	Hawaiʻi	Hilo
1	Henry Lai Hipp	R	Hawaiʻi	Hilo
1	Thomas T. Sakakihara	R	Hawaiʻi	Hilo
2	Arthur A. Akina	R	Hawaiʻi	Kamuela
2	James Ako	R	Hawaiʻi	Holualoa
2	Francis K. Aona	R	Hawaiʻi	Kealakekua
2	Robert L. Wilhelm	R	Hawaiʻi	Waiʻōhinu (Kaʻū)
3	Clarence A. Crozier	D	Maui	Wailuku
3	William H. Engle	R	Maui	Spreckelsville
3	Harry H. Hanakahi	R	Maui	Kaunakakai (Molokai)
3	Manuel G. Paschoal	R	Maui	Puʻunēnē
3	Henry P. Robinson Jr.	R	Maui	Lahaina
3	Samuel A. Sniffen	R	Maui	Pā'ia
4	Raymond C. Brown	R	Oahu	Honolulu
4	Ezra J. Crane	R	Oahu	Honolulu
4	William H. Crozier Jr.	D	Oahu	Honolulu
4	Walter J. Macfarlane	R	Oahu	Honolulu
4	Roy A. Vitousek	R	Oahu	Honolulu
4	J. Howard Worrall	R	Oahu	Honolulu
5	Yew Char	D	Oahu	Honolulu
5	Chas. P. Cunningham	D	Oahu	Honolulu
5	Edward P. Fogerty	R	Oahu	Honolulu
5	Charles H. Holt (Note: Holt was elected on April 3, 1935, to succeed James A. Hattie, Republican, who died on March 17, 1935.)	D	Oahu	Waiʻanae
5	George H. Holt Jr.	D	Oahu	Waiʻanae
5	William W. Luke	R	Oahu	Honolulu
6	H.H. Brodie	R	Kauaʻi	Hanapēpē
6	Clement Gomes	R	Kauaʻi	Līhuʻe
6	Benjamin M. Tashiro	R	Kauaʻi	Līhuʻe
6	Fred W. Wichman	R	Kauaʻi	Kapaʻa
