= 17th Hawaii Territorial Legislature =

Session of the Hawaii Territorial Legislature

17th Hawaiʻi Territorial Legislature
←	16th	18th	→
- Seal of the Territory of Hawaii

Overview
- Legislative body: Hawaii Territorial Legislature
- Jurisdiction: Territory of Hawaii, United States

Senate
- Members: 15
- President: George P. Cooke
- Vice President: Francis H. Ii Brown

House of Representatives
- Members: 30
- Speaker: Herbert N. Ahuna
- Vice Speaker: Manuel Gomes Paschoal

The Seventeenth Legislature of the Territory of Hawaii was a session of the Hawaii Territorial Legislature. The session convened in Honolulu, Hawaii, and ran from February 15 until June 1, 1933. On April 26, 1933, Governor Lawrence M. Judd extended the session by Executive Order.

== Legislative session ==
The session ran from February 15 until June 1, 1933. It passed 212 bills into law.

== Senators ==
↓
11	0	4
Republican	Independent	Democratic

Affiliation	Party (Shading indicates majority caucus)			Total	
Affiliation	Republican	Ind	Democratic	Total	Vacant
End of previous legislature (1932)	14	0	1	15	0
Begin (1933)	11	0	4	15	0
Latest voting share	73.3%	0%	26.7%		

District	Senator	Party	County	Address
1	James Campsie	R	Hawaiʻi	Pāhala
1	Stephen L. Desha Sr.	R	Hawaiʻi	Hilo
1	William H. Hill	R	Hawaiʻi	Hilo
1	Robert H. Hind	R	Hawaiʻi	Kailua
2	George P. Cooke	R	Maui	Kaunakakai (Molokai)
2	Harry H. Holt	R	Maui	Wailuku
2	Harold W. Rice	R	Maui	Pā'ia
3	Francis H. Ii Brown	R	Oahu	Honolulu
3	Henry Freitas	D	Oahu	Honolulu
3	William H. Heen	D	Oahu	Honolulu
3	Lester Petrie	D	Oahu	Honolulu
3	Joseph L. Sylva	R	Oahu	Honolulu
3	David K. Trask	D	Oahu	Honolulu
4	Charles A. Rice	R	Kauaʻi	Līhuʻe
4	Elsie H. Wilcox	R	Kauaʻi	Līhuʻe

== House of Representatives ==
↓
20	10
Republican	Democratic

Affiliation	Party (Shading indicates majority caucus)			Total	
Affiliation	Republican	Ind	Democratic	Total	Vacant
End of previous legislature (1932)	28	0	2	30	0
Begin (1933)	20	0	10	30	0
Latest voting share	66.7%		33.3%		

District	Representative	Party	County	Address
1	Herbert N. Ahuna	R	Hawaiʻi	Hilo
1	Daniel A. Devine	D	Hawaiʻi	Hilo
1	John A. Lee	R	Hawaiʻi	Hilo
1	Thomas T. Sakakihara	R	Hawaiʻi	Hilo
2	Arthur A. Akina	R	Hawaiʻi	Kamuela
2	Francis K. Aona	R	Hawaiʻi	Kealakekua
2	George K. Kawaha	R	Hawaiʻi	Waiʻōhinu (Kaʻū)
2	Shunzo Ushiroda	R	Hawaiʻi	Kealakekua
3	Y.H. Char	R	Maui	Makawao
3	William H. Engle	R	Maui	Kahului
3	Thomas Holstein	R	Maui	Wailuku
3	Manuel G. Paschoal	R	Maui	Puʻunēnē
3	Henry P. Robinson Jr.	R	Maui	Lahaina
3	Samuel A. Sniffen	R	Maui	Pā'ia
4	Eugene H. Beebe	R	Oahu	Honolulu
4	Ezra J. Crane (Note: Crane was elected at a Special Election held on January 7, 1933 to fill the vacancy caused by the death of Representative-elect Honorable Thomas V. King, who was elected at the General Election held on November 8, 1932.)	R	Oahu	Honolulu
4	William H. Crozier Jr.	D	Oahu	Honolulu
4	O.P. Soares	R	Oahu	Honolulu
4	Ralph E. Woolley	R	Oahu	Honolulu
4	J. Howard Worrall	R	Oahu	Honolulu
5	William Borthwick	D	Oahu	Honolulu
5	Yew Char	D	Oahu	Honolulu
5	Christopher K. Holt	D	Oahu	Honolulu
5	George H. Holt Jr.	D	Oahu	Honolulu
5	Jonah Kumalae	D	Oahu	Honolulu
5	Andrew M. Yamashiro	D	Oahu	Honolulu
6	Theodore Anderson	D	Kauaʻi	Kekaha
6	John J. Gomez	D	Kauaʻi	Līhuʻe
6	Thomas Ouye	R	Kauaʻi	Līhuʻe
6	Fred W. Wichman	R	Kauaʻi	Kapaʻa
