= 15th Hawaii Territorial Legislature =

1929 session of the legislative body

15th Hawaiʻi Territorial Legislature
| ← | 14th | 16th | → |
- Seal of the Territory of Hawaii

Overview
- Legislative body: Hawaii Territorial Legislature
- Jurisdiction: Territory of Hawaii, United States

Senate
- Members: 15
- President: Robert W. Shingle
- Vice President: Ernest A. K. Akina

House of Representatives
- Members: 30
- Speaker: Frederick D. Lowrey
- Vice Speaker: John H. Coney

The Fifteenth Legislature of the Territory of Hawaii was a session of the Hawaii Territorial Legislature. The session convened in Honolulu, Hawaiʻi, and ran from February 20 until May 1, 1929.

== Legislative session ==
The session ran from February 20 until May 1, 1929. It passed 258 bills into law.

== Senators ==
↓
| 14 | 0 | 1 |
| Republican | Independent | Democratic |

| Affiliation | Party (Shading indicates majority caucus) | | | Total | |
| Affiliation | Republican | Ind | Democratic | Total | Vacant |
|---|---|---|---|---|---|
| End of previous legislature (1927) | 13 | 0 | 2 | 15 | 0 |
| Begin (1929) | 14 | 0 | 1 | 15 | 0 |
| Latest voting share | 93.3% | 0% | 6.7% | | |

| District | Senator | Party | County | Address |
|---|---|---|---|---|
| 1 | Ernest A. K. Akina | R | Hawaiʻi | Kohala |
| 1 | Stephen L. Desha Sr. | R | Hawaiʻi | Hilo |
| 1 | Robert H. Hind | R | Hawaiʻi | Kailua |
| 1 | William K. Kamau | R | Hawaiʻi | Hilo |
| 2 | George P. Cooke | R | Maui | Kaunakakai (Molokai) |
| 2 | A. Paul Low | R | Maui | Wailuku |
| 2 | Harold W. Rice | R | Maui | Pā'ia |
| 3 | Francis H. Ii Brown | R | Oʻahu | Honolulu |
| 3 | Clarence H. Cooke | R | Oʻahu | Honolulu |
| 3 | William H. Heen | D | Oʻahu | Honolulu |
| 3 | James K. Jarrett | R | Oʻahu | Honolulu |
| 3 | William H. McInerny | R | Oʻahu | Honolulu |
| 3 | Robert W. Shingle | R | Oʻahu | Honolulu |
| 4 | Henry K. Aki | R | Kauaʻi | Kapaʻa |
| 4 | Charles A. Rice | R | Kauaʻi | Līhuʻe |

== House of Representatives ==
↓
| 27 | 3 |
| Republican | Democratic |

| Affiliation | Party (Shading indicates majority caucus) | | | Total | |
| Affiliation | Republican | Ind | Democratic | Total | Vacant |
|---|---|---|---|---|---|
| End of previous legislature (1927) | 28 | 0 | 2 | 30 | 0 |
| Begin (1929) | 27 | 0 | 3 | 30 | 0 |
| Latest voting share | 90% | | 10% | | |

| District | Representative | Party | County | Address |
|---|---|---|---|---|
| 1 | A. M. Cabrinha | R | Hawaiʻi | Hilo |
| 1 | William H. Hill | R | Hawaiʻi | Hilo |
| 1 | William J. Kimi | R | Hawaiʻi | Hilo |
| 1 | Evan Da Silva | R | Hawaiʻi | Hilo |
| 2 | Francis K. Aona | R | Hawaiʻi | Kealakekua |
| 2 | George K. Kawaha | R | Hawaiʻi | Waiʻōhinu (Kaʻū) |
| 2 | John R. Smith | R | Hawaiʻi | Hoʻokena |
| 2 | Charles K. Stillman | R | Hawaiʻi | Kohala |
| 3 | Frank Archer | R | Maui | Hoʻolehua (Molokai) |
| 3 | William H. Engle | R | Maui | Kahului |
| 3 | P. J. Goodness | R | Maui | Kula (Waiakoa) |
| 3 | Henry L. Holstein | R | Maui | Wailuku |
| 3 | Manuel Gomes Paschoal | R | Maui | Puʻunēnē |
| 3 | Henry P. Robinson Jr. | R | Maui | Lahaina |
| 4 | Frederick D. Lowrey | R | Oʻahu | Honolulu |
| 4 | Harry T. Mills | R | Oʻahu | Honolulu |
| 4 | Ray J. O'Brien | R | Oʻahu | Honolulu |
| 4 | T. H. Petrie | R | Oʻahu | Honolulu |
| 4 | O. P. Soares | R | Oʻahu | Honolulu |
| 4 | Roy A. Vitousek | R | Oʻahu | Honolulu |
| 5 | Albert K. Akana | R | Oʻahu | Honolulu |
| 5 | John C. Anderson | R | Oʻahu | Honolulu |
| 5 | Yew Char | D | Oʻahu | Honolulu |
| 5 | Charles H. K. Holt | D | Oʻahu | Honolulu |
| 5 | George H. Holt, Jr. | D | Oʻahu | Waiʻanae |
| 5 | Nolle R. Smith | R | Oʻahu | Honolulu |
| 6 | Alfred U. Alohikea | R | Kauaʻi | Hanalei |
| 6 | John H. Coney | R | Kauaʻi | Līhuʻe |
| 6 | Clement Gomes | R | Kauaʻi | Līhuʻe |
| 6 | A. Q. Marcallino | R | Kauaʻi | Waimea |
