= 16th Hawaii Territorial Legislature =

1931 session of the legislative body

16th Hawaiʻi Territorial Legislature
←	15th	17th	→
- Seal of the Territory of Hawaii

Overview
- Legislative body: Hawaii Territorial Legislature
- Jurisdiction: Territory of Hawaii, United States

Senate
- Members: 15
- President: Robert W. Shingle
- Vice President: Ernest A. K. Akina

House of Representatives
- Members: 30
- Speaker: Roy A. Vitousek
- Vice Speaker: Evan Da Silva

The Sixteenth Legislature of the Territory of Hawaii was a session of the Hawaii Territorial Legislature. The session convened in Honolulu, Hawaiʻi, and ran from February 18 until May 23, 1931.

== Legislative session ==
The session ran from February 18 until May 23, 1931. It passed 298 bills into law.

A First Special Session convened on January 18, 1932, and adjourned on March 28, 1932. It passed 19 bills into law.

The Second Special Session convened on March 29, 1932, and adjourned on June 3, 1932. It passed 76 bills into law. Act 10 (House Bill No. 27), signed by Governor Lawrence M. Judd on April 22, 1932, amended Section 1222 of the Revised Laws of Hawaii 1925, as amended, which increased the fee for certified copies of birth, death, and marriage certificates from one dollar ($1.00) to two dollars ($2.00).

== Senators ==
↓
14	0	1
Republican	Independent	Democratic

Affiliation	Party (Shading indicates majority caucus)			Total	
Affiliation	Republican	Ind	Democratic	Total	Vacant
End of previous legislature (1929)	14	0	1	15	0
Begin (1931)	14	0	1	15	0
Latest voting share	93.3%	0%	6.7%		

District	Senator	Party	County	Address
1	Ernest A. K. Akina	R	Hawaiʻi	Kohala
1	Stephen L. Desha Sr.	R	Hawaiʻi	Hilo
1	Robert H. Hind	R	Hawaiʻi	Kailua
1	William K. Kamau	R	Hawaiʻi	Hilo
2	George P. Cooke	R	Maui	Kaunakakai (Molokai)
2	A. Paul Low	R	Maui	Wailuku
2	Harold W. Rice	R	Maui	Pā'ia
3	Francis H. Ii Brown	R	Oʻahu	Honolulu
3	Clarence H. Cooke	R	Oʻahu	Honolulu
3	William H. Heen	D	Oʻahu	Honolulu
3	James K. Jarrett	R	Oʻahu	Honolulu
3	Robert W. Shingle	R	Oʻahu	Honolulu
3	Joseph L. Sylva	R	Oʻahu	Honolulu
4	Henry K. Aki	R	Kauaʻi	Kapaʻa
4	Charles A. Rice	R	Kauaʻi	Līhuʻe

== House of Representatives ==
↓
28	2
Republican	Democratic

Affiliation	Party (Shading indicates majority caucus)			Total	
Affiliation	Republican	Ind	Democratic	Total	Vacant
End of previous legislature (1929)	27	0	3	30	0
Begin (1931)	28	0	2	30	0
Latest voting share	93.3%		6.7%		

District	Representative	Party	County	Address
1	Herbert N. Ahuna	R	Hawaiʻi	Hilo
1	William J. Kimi	R	Hawaiʻi	Hilo
1	T. (Tasaku) Oka (Note: According to the Honolulu Star-Bulletin, Oka, an attorney, was the first AJA from Hawaiʻi island to sit in the territorial Legislature. He served a single term and passed away on May 13, 1936 in Pāpaʻikou.)	R	Hawaiʻi	Hilo
1	Evan Da Silva	R	Hawaiʻi	Hilo
2	Arthur A. Akina	R	Hawaiʻi	Kamuela
2	Francis K. Aona	R	Hawaiʻi	Kealakekua
2	George K. Kawaha	R	Hawaiʻi	Waiʻōhinu (Kaʻū)
2	John R. Smith	R	Hawaiʻi	Hoʻokena
3	J. Walter Cameron	R	Maui	Makawao
3	William H. Engle	R	Maui	Kahului
3	Manase K. Makekau	R	Maui	Hoʻolehua (Molokai)
3	Manuel Gomes Paschoal	R	Maui	Puʻunēnē
3	Henry P. Robinson Jr.	R	Maui	Lahaina
3	Samuel A. Sniffen	R	Maui	Pā'ia
4	Eugene H. Beebe	R	Oʻahu	Honolulu
4	Eben P. Lowe	R	Oʻahu	Honolulu
4	Harry T. Mills	R	Oʻahu	Honolulu
4	Ray J. O'Brien	R	Oʻahu	Honolulu
4	Roy A. Vitousek	R	Oʻahu	Honolulu
4	J. Howard Worrall	R	Oʻahu	Honolulu
5	Albert K. Akana	R	Oʻahu	Honolulu
5	Charles H. K. Holt	D	Oʻahu	Honolulu
5	Wm. K. Isaacs Jr.	R	Oʻahu	Honolulu
5	R. N. Mossman	R	Oʻahu	Honolulu
5	Nolle R. Smith	R	Oʻahu	Honolulu
5	Andrew M. Yamashiro	D	Oʻahu	Honolulu
6	W. A. Fernandez (Note: Fernandez was elected at a Special Election held on December 20, 1930, to fill the vacancy caused by the death of C. A. Baggott, who was elected at the General Election held on November 4, 1930.)	R	Kauaʻi	Kapaʻa
6	Clement Gomes	R	Kauaʻi	Līhuʻe
6	A. Q. Marcallino	R	Kauaʻi	ʻEleʻele
6	Fred W. Wichman	R	Kauaʻi	Kapaʻa
