= List of U.S. cities with diacritics =

This is a list of U.S. cities whose official names have diacritics and other non-alphabetical symbols.

== Alaska ==
- Utqiaġvik

== American Samoa ==
- Āfono
- Ālega
- 'Āmanave
- Āmouli
- Aūa
- Fagasā
- Faleāsao
- Lumā
- Tāfuna

== California ==
- La Cañada Flintridge, Los Angeles County
- Los Baños, Merced County
- Piñon Hills, San Bernardino County
- San José, Santa Clara County

== Colorado ==
- Cañon, Conejos County
- Cañon City
- Piñon, Montrose County
- Piñon, Pueblo County
- Piñon Acres, La Plata County

== Guam ==
- Hågat
- Hagåtña
- Humåtak
- Inalåhan
- Sånta Rita-Sumai

== Hawaii ==
Names of communities in Hawaii (Note: Hawaii has no organized government below the county level. The only entity designated in state law as a "city" is the City and County of Honolulu, consisting of the entire island of Oʻahu plus a number of outlying islands. All communities in the state are census-designated places.) often use the ʻokina, not to be confused with the apostrophe. Many also use kahakō, which indicate long vowels in the Hawaiian language.

- ʻĀhuimanu
- ʻĀinaloa
- Hanapēpē
- Haʻikū-Pauwela
- Hālawa
- Hāliʻimaile
- Hāmoa, Maui County
- Hāna
- Hāʻōʻū
- Hāwī
- Hīlea, Hawaiʻi County
- Hōlualoa
- Hōnaunau-Nāpōʻopoʻo
- Honokōhau, Maui County
- Hoʻōpūloa, Hawaiʻi County
- Kāʻanapali
- Kaimū
- Kākiʻo, Maui County
- Kalāheo
- Kamalō, Maui County
- Kāneʻohe
- Kaupō
- Kaʻūpūlehu
- Keālia
- Kēōkea, Hawaiʻi County
- Kēōkea, Maui County
- Kīhei
- Kīholo, Hawaiʻi County
- Kīlauea
- Kīpahulu
- Kīpū, Maui County
- Kōloa
- Kūkaʻiau, Hawaiʻi County
- Kūkiʻo, Hawaiʻi County
- Lāʻie
- Lānaʻi City
- Laupāhoehoe
- Lāwaʻi
- Līhuʻe
- Māʻalaea
- Māʻili
- Mākaha
- Mākaha Valley
- Mākena
- Mānā, Hawaiʻi County
- Mokulēʻia
- Mōpua, Maui County
- Mūʻolea, Maui County
- Nāʻālehu
- Nāhiku
- Nānākuli
- Nānāwale Estates
- Nāpili-Honokōwai
- Nīnole, Hāmākua District, Hawaiʻi County
- Nīnole, Kaʻū District, Hawaiʻi County
- ʻŌmaʻo
- ʻŌmaʻopio, Maui County
- ʻŌʻōkala
- Pāʻauhau
- Pāhala
- Pāhoa
- Pāʻia
- Pākalā Village
- Pālehua, Honolulu County
- Pāpā Bay Estates, Hawaiʻi County
- Pāpaʻaloa
- Pāpaʻikou
- Poʻipū
- Puaʻākala, Hawaiʻi County
- Pūʻālaʻa, Hawaiʻi County
- Puakō
- Pūkoʻo, Maui County
- Pūlehu, Maui County
- Pūpūkea
- Puʻunēnē
- Wahiawā
- Wahīlauhue, Maui County
- Waikāne
- Waikapū
- Waimānalo
- Waimānalo Beach
- Waiʻōhinu
- Waipāhoehoe, Hawaiʻi County
- Welokā, Hawaiʻi County

== Louisiana ==
- Pointe à la Hache
- West Pointe à la Hache

== Minnesota ==
- Arnesén, Lake of the Woods County
- Lindström

== New Mexico ==
- Cañada de los Alamos
- Cañon, Mora County
- Cañon, Sandoval County
- Cañoncito, Bernalillo County
- Cañoncito, Rio Arriba County
- Cañoncito, Santa Fe County
- Cañoncito, Taos County
- Cañones
- Doña Ana
- Española
- Lower Cañones, Rio Arriba County
- Peña Blanca
- Peñasco
- Peñasco Blanco, San Miguel County
- Piñon
- Señorito, Sandoval County

== Puerto Rico ==
- Añasco
- Bayamón
- Canóvanas
- Cataño
- Comerío
- Guánica
- Juana Díaz
- Las Marías
- Loíza
- Manatí
- Mayagüez
- Peñuelas
- Rincón
- Río Grande
- San Germán
- San Sebastián
- Cañabón, a ward of Caguas, Puerto Rico
- Castañer, Puerto Rico
- Río Piedras, Puerto Rico

== Texas ==
- César Chávez
- La Peñusca, Cameron County
- Lopeño
- Peñitas
- Salineño
- Salineño North
