= 20th Hawaii Territorial Legislature =

Session of the Hawaii Territorial Legislature

20th Hawaiʻi Territorial Legislature
←	19th	21st	→
- Seal of the Territory of Hawaii

Overview
- Legislative body: Hawaii Territorial Legislature
- Jurisdiction: Territory of Hawaii, United States

Senate
- Members: 15
- President: George P. Cooke
- Vice President: Eugene H. Beebe

House of Representatives
- Members: 30
- Speaker: Roy A. Vitousek
- Vice Speaker: Emil M. Muller

The Twentieth Legislature of the Territory of Hawaii was a session of the Hawaii Territorial Legislature. The session convened in Honolulu, Hawaii, and ran from February 15 until April 26, 1939.

== Legislative session ==
The session ran from February 15 until April 26, 1939. It passed 264 bills into law.

== Senators ==
↓
11	1	3
Republican	Independent	Democratic

Affiliation	Party (Shading indicates majority caucus)			Total	
Affiliation	Republican	Ind	Democratic	Total	Vacant
End of previous legislature (1937)	10	1	4	15	0
Begin (1939)	11	1	3	15	0
Latest voting share	73.3%	6.7%	20%		

District	Senator	Party	County	Address
1	Sarah Todd Cunningham	R	Hawaiʻi	Hilo
1	William H. Hill	R	Hawaiʻi	Hilo
1	James Kealoha (Note: Kealoha filled the vacancy caused by the death of Senator James Campsie.)	R	Hawaiʻi	Hilo
1	Charles H. Silva	R	Hawaiʻi	Kohala
2	George P. Cooke (Note: Cooke was a resident of the island of Molokai which is a constituent island of the County of Maui.)	R	Maui	Kaunakakai (Molokai)
2	Clarence A. Crozier	NP	Maui	Wailuku
2	Harry H. Holt	R	Maui	Wailuku
3	Eugene H. Beebe	R	Oahu	Honolulu
3	Francis H. Ii Brown	R	Oahu	Honolulu
3	Joseph R. Farrington	R	Oahu	Honolulu
3	William H. Heen	D	Oahu	Honolulu
3	Francis K. Sylva (Note: F.K. Sylva filled the vacancy caused by the death of Senator Joseph L. Sylva.)	R	Oahu	Honolulu
3	David K. Trask	D	Oahu	Kaneohe
4	John B. Fernandes	D	Kauaʻi	Kapaa
4	Elsie H. Wilcox	R	Kauaʻi	Lihue

== House of Representatives ==
↓
28	2
Republican	Democratic

Affiliation	Party (Shading indicates majority caucus)			Total	
Affiliation	Republican	Ind	Democratic	Total	Vacant
End of previous legislature (1937)	26	0	4	30	0
Begin (1939)	28	0	2	30	0
Latest voting share	93.3%		6.7%		

District	Representative	Party	County	Address
1	V. A. Carvalho	R	Hawaiʻi	Hilo
1	August Costa, Jr.	R	Hawaiʻi	Hilo
1	Albert Kazuo Kimura	R	Hawaiʻi	Hilo
1	Henry Lai Hipp	R	Hawaiʻi	Hilo
2	Arthur A. Akina	R	Hawaiʻi	Kamuela
2	James Ako	R	Hawaiʻi	Kailua
2	Francis K. Aona	R	Hawaiʻi	Kealakekua
2	Robert L. Wilhelm	R	Hawaiʻi	Naalehu
3	Edward Baker	R	Maui	Makawao
3	William H. Engle	R	Maui	Kahului
3	Reuben Goodness	R	Maui	Wailuku
3	Emil M. Muller	R	Maui	Wailuku
3	Manuel G. Paschoal	R	Maui	Puʻunēnē
3	Henry P. Robinson, Jr.	R	Maui	Lahaina
4	Flora Kaai Hayes	R	Oahu	Honolulu
4	Richard King Kimball	R	Oahu	Honolulu
4	Walter K. Macfarlane	R	Oahu	Honolulu
4	Roy A. Vitousek	R	Oahu	Honolulu
4	Ralph E. Woolley	R	Oahu	Honolulu
4	J. Howard Worrall	R	Oahu	Honolulu
5	Henry C. Akina	R	Oahu	Honolulu
5	George M. Eguchi	R	Oahu	Honolulu
5	Hiram L. Fong	R	Oahu	Honolulu
5	George H. Holt, Jr.	D	Oahu	Waianae
5	Kam Tai Lee	R	Oahu	Honolulu
5	Bina Mossmann	R	Oahu	Honolulu
6	Clement Gomes	R	Kauaʻi	Lihue
6	Thomas Ouye	R	Kauaʻi	Lihue
6	Fred L. Schumacher	D	Kauaʻi	Lihue
6	William H. Wright	R	Kauaʻi	Waimea
