= 19th Hawaii Territorial Legislature =

Session of the Hawaii Territorial Legislature

19th Hawaiʻi Territorial Legislature
←	18th	20th	→
- Seal of the Territory of Hawaii

Overview
- Legislative body: Hawaii Territorial Legislature
- Jurisdiction: Territory of Hawaii, United States

Senate
- Members: 15
- President: H. A. Baldwin
- Vice President: Eugene H. Beebe

House of Representatives
- Members: 30
- Speaker: Roy A. Vitousek
- Vice Speaker: Manuel Gomes Paschoal

The Nineteenth Legislature of the Territory of Hawaii was a session of the Hawaii Territorial Legislature. The session convened in Honolulu, Hawaii, and ran from February 17 until April 28, 1937.

== Legislative session ==
The session ran from February 17 until April 28, 1937. It passed 247 bills into law.

== Senators ==
↓
10	1	4
Republican	Independent	Democratic

Affiliation	Party (Shading indicates majority caucus)			Total	
Affiliation	Republican	Ind	Democratic	Total	Vacant
End of previous legislature (1935)	10	0	5	15	0
Begin (1937)	10	1	4	15	0
Latest voting share	66.7%	6.7%	26.7%		

District	Senator	Party	County	Address
1	James Campsie	R	Hawaiʻi	Pāhala
1	Sarah Todd Cunningham	D	Hawaiʻi	Hilo
1	William J. Kimi	R	Hawaiʻi	Hilo
1	Charles H. Silva	D	Hawaiʻi	Kapa'au
2	H. A. Baldwin	R	Maui	Makawao
2	Clarence A. Crozier	NP	Maui	Wailuku
2	Harry H. Holt	R	Maui	Wailuku
3	Eugene H. Beebe	R	Oahu	Honolulu
3	Francis H. Ii Brown	R	Oahu	Honolulu
3	Joseph R. Farrington	R	Oahu	Honolulu
3	William H. Heen	D	Oahu	Honolulu
3	Joseph L. Sylva	R	Oahu	Honolulu
3	David K. Trask	D	Oahu	Kaneohe
4	Charles A. Rice	R	Kauaʻi	Līhuʻe
4	Elsie H. Wilcox	R	Kauaʻi	Līhuʻe

== House of Representatives ==
↓
26	4
Republican	Democratic

Affiliation	Party (Shading indicates majority caucus)			Total	
Affiliation	Republican	Ind	Democratic	Total	Vacant
End of previous legislature (1935)	23	0	7	30	0
Begin (1937)	26	0	4	30	0
Latest voting share	86.7%		13.3%		

District	Representative	Party	County	Address
1	V. A. Carvalho	R	Hawaiʻi	Hilo
1	August Costa, Jr.	R	Hawaiʻi	Hilo
1	James D. Kealoha	D	Hawaiʻi	Hilo
1	Thomas T. Sakakihara	R	Hawaiʻi	Hilo
2	Arthur A. Akina	R	Hawaiʻi	Kamuela
2	James Ako	R	Hawaiʻi	Kailua
2	Francis K. Aona	R	Hawaiʻi	Kealakekua
2	Robert L. Wilhelm	R	Hawaiʻi	Naalehu
3	Edward Baker	R	Maui	Makawao
3	William H. Engle	R	Maui	Kahului
3	Reuben Goodness	R	Maui	Wailuku
3	Emil M. Muller	R	Maui	Kula (Waiakoa)
3	Manuel G. Paschoal	R	Maui	Puʻunēnē
3	Henry P. Robinson, Jr.	R	Maui	Lahaina
4	Adna G. Clarke	R	Oahu	Honolulu
4	Richard King Kimball	R	Oahu	Honolulu
4	Walter K. Macfarlane	R	Oahu	Honolulu
4	Roy A. Vitousek	R	Oahu	Honolulu
4	Ralph E. Woolley	R	Oahu	Honolulu
4	J. Howard Worrall	R	Oahu	Honolulu
5	Henry C. Akina	R	Oahu	Honolulu
5	Yew Char	D	Oahu	Honolulu
5	George M. Eguchi	R	Oahu	Honolulu
5	Edward P. Fogerty	R	Oahu	Honolulu
5	George H. Holt, Jr.	D	Oahu	Waianae
5	Kam Tai Lee	R	Oahu	Honolulu
6	John B. Fernandes	D	Kauaʻi	Lihue
6	Clement Gomes	R	Kauaʻi	Lihue
6	A. Q. Marcallino (Note: Initial PDF source rendered name as Marcallmo. Marcallino also served in the 21st, 22nd, 23rd, and 25th Territorial Legislatures.)	R	Kauaʻi	ʻEleʻele
6	Thomas Ouye	R	Kauaʻi	Lihue
