= 21st Hawaii Territorial Legislature =

Session of the Hawaii Territorial Legislature

21st Hawaiʻi Territorial Legislature
←	20th	22nd	→
- Seal of the Territory of Hawaii

Overview
- Legislative body: Hawaii Territorial Legislature
- Jurisdiction: Territory of Hawaii, United States

Senate
- Members: 15
- President: George P. Cooke
- Vice President: V. A. Carvalho

House of Representatives
- Members: 30
- Speaker: Arthur A. Akina
- Vice Speaker: Manuel Gomes Paschoal

The Twenty-First Legislature of the Territory of Hawaii was a session of the Hawaii Territorial Legislature. The session convened in Honolulu, Hawaii, and ran from February 20 until April 30, 1941. It was the final legislative session convened prior to the Attack on Pearl Harbor.

== Legislative session ==
The session ran from February 20 until April 30, 1941. It passed 334 bills into law.

A special session ran from September 15 until November 1, 1941. It passed 98 bills into law.

Act 19 (House Bill No. 58), signed by Governor Joseph Poindexter on April 11, 1941, made it a misdemeanor to label, advertise or offer for sale coffee as Hawaiian or Kona Coffee unless one hundred percent of such coffee was raised in the Territory. The penalty included a fine of not more than $1,000 (around $20,000 in 2022), and/or not more than one year imprisonment. (Note: Coffee labelling was regulated by Act 289 (SLH 1991). It was criminalized as a felony by Act 328 (SLH 2012).)

== Senators ==
↓
12	3
Republican	Democratic

Affiliation	Party (Shading indicates majority caucus)			Total	
Affiliation	Republican	Ind	Democratic	Total	Vacant
End of previous legislature (1939)	11	1	3	15	0
Begin (1941)	12	0	3	15	0
Latest voting share	80%		20%		

District	Senator	Party	County	Address
1	Sanji Abe	R	Hawaiʻi	Hilo
1	V. A. Carvalho	R	Hawaiʻi	Hilo
1	William H. Hill	R	Hawaiʻi	Hilo
1	Charles H. Silva	R	Hawaiʻi	Kohala
2	George P. Cooke (Note: Cooke was a resident of the island of Molokai which is a constituent island of the County of Maui.)	R	Maui	Kaunakakai (Molokai)
2	Charles M. Peters	R	Maui	Wailuku
2	Harold W. Rice	R	Maui	Kula (Waiakoa)
3	David Y. K. Akana	R	Oahu	Honolulu
3	Francis H. Ii Brown	R	Oahu	Honolulu
3	Joseph R. Farrington	R	Oahu	Honolulu
3	William H. Heen	D	Oahu	Honolulu
3	Francis K. Sylva	R	Oahu	Honolulu
3	David K. Trask	D	Oahu	Kaneohe
4	John B. Fernandes	D	Kauaʻi	Kapaa
4	Clement Gomes	R	Kauaʻi	Lihue

== House of Representatives ==
↓
27	3
Republican	Democratic

Affiliation	Party (Shading indicates majority caucus)			Total	
Affiliation	Republican	Ind	Democratic	Total	Vacant
End of previous legislature (1939)	28	0	2	30	0
Begin (1941)	27	0	3	30	0
Latest voting share	90%		10%		

District	Representative	Party	County	Address
1	Juichi Doi	R	Hawaiʻi	Hilo
1	William J. Payne	R	Hawaiʻi	Hilo
1	Thomas Pedro, Jr.	D	Hawaiʻi	Hilo
1	Thomas T. Sakakihara	R	Hawaiʻi	Hilo
2	Arthur A. Akina	R	Hawaiʻi	Kamuela
2	Francis K. Aona	R	Hawaiʻi	Kealakekua
2	Ted T. Kuramoto	R	Hawaiʻi	Kealakekua
2	Robert L. Wilhelm	R	Hawaiʻi	Naalehu
3	Alfred A. Afat (Note: Afat was a resident of the island of Molokai which is a constituent island of the County of Maui.)	R	Maui	Hoolehua (Molokai)
3	William H. Engle	R	Maui	Spreckelsville
3	Reuben Goodness	R	Maui	Wailuku
3	David K. Kapohakimohewa	R	Maui	Kula (Waiakoa)
3	Manuel G. Paschoal	R	Maui	Wailuku
3	Henry P. Robinson, Jr.	R	Maui	Lahaina
4	Lindsley Austin	R	Oahu	Honolulu
4	Walter Hyde Dillingham (Note: Nephew of Walter F. Dillingham, and eldest grandchild of Benjamin Franklin Dillingham)	R	Oahu	Honolulu
4	Walter K. Macfarlane	R	Oahu	Honolulu
4	James M. O’Dowda	R	Oahu	Honolulu
4	Hebden Porteus	R	Oahu	Honolulu
4	J. Howard Worrall	R	Oahu	Honolulu
5	Henry C. Akina	R	Oahu	Honolulu
5	Yew Char	D	Oahu	Honolulu
5	George M. Eguchi	R	Oahu	Honolulu
5	Hiram L. Fong	R	Oahu	Honolulu
5	George H. Holt, Jr.	D	Oahu	Waianae
5	Kam Tai Lee	R	Oahu	Honolulu
6	Jacob K. Maka	R	Kauaʻi	Hanalei
6	A. Q. Marcallino	R	Kauaʻi	Eleele
6	Wallace Otsuka	R	Kauaʻi	Kapaa
6	Thomas Ouye	R	Kauaʻi	Lihue
