= 22nd Hawaii Territorial Legislature =

Session of the Hawaii Territorial Legislature

22nd Hawaiʻi Territorial Legislature
←	21st	23rd	→
- Seal of the Territory of Hawaii

Overview
- Legislative body: Hawaii Territorial Legislature
- Jurisdiction: Territory of Hawaii, United States

Senate
- Members: 15
- President: Harold W. Rice
- Vice President: V. A. Carvalho

House of Representatives
- Members: 30
- Speaker: Roy A. Vitousek
- Vice Speaker: Manuel Gomes Paschoal

The Twenty-Second Legislature of the Territory of Hawaii was a session of the Hawaii Territorial Legislature. The session convened in Honolulu, Hawaii, and ran from February 7 until April 28, 1943. It was the only legislative session convened while Hawaii was under martial law during World War II.

== Legislative session ==
The session ran from February 7 until April 28, 1943. It passed 230 bills into law.

== Senators ==
↓
11	4
Republican	Democratic

Affiliation	Party (Shading indicates majority caucus)			Total	
Affiliation	Republican	Ind	Democratic	Total	Vacant
End of previous legislature (1941)	12	0	3	15	0
Begin (1943)	11	0	4	15	0
Latest voting share	73.3%		26.7%		

District	Senator	Party	County	Address
1	Sarah Todd Cunningham	R	Hawaiʻi	Hilo
1	V. A. Carvalho	R	Hawaiʻi	Hilo
1	William H. Hill	R	Hawaiʻi	Hilo
1	Charles H. Silva	R	Hawaiʻi	Kohala
2	A. Kamokila Campbell (Note: Campbell was a resident of the island of Molokai which is a constituent island of the County of Maui.)	D	Maui	Kalae (Molokai)
2	Charles M. Peters	R	Maui	Wailuku
2	Harold W. Rice	R	Maui	Kula (Waiakoa)
3	David Y. K. Akana	R	Oahu	Honolulu
3	Francis H. Ii Brown	R	Oahu	Honolulu
3	Charles S. Crane	R	Oahu	Honolulu
3	William H. Heen	D	Oahu	Honolulu
3	Francis K. Sylva	R	Oahu	Honolulu
3	David K. Trask	D	Oahu	Kaneohe
4	John B. Fernandes	D	Kauaʻi	Kapaa
4	Clement Gomes	R	Kauaʻi	Lihue

== House of Representatives ==
↓
25	5
Republican	Democratic

Affiliation	Party (Shading indicates majority caucus)			Total	
Affiliation	Republican	Ind	Democratic	Total	Vacant
End of previous legislature (1941)	27	0	3	30	0
Begin (1943)	25	0	5	30	0
Latest voting share	83.3%		16.7%		

District	Representative	Party	County	Address
1	Joseph G. Andrews	R	Hawaiʻi	Hilo
1	William J. Nobriga	R	Hawaiʻi	Hilo
1	William J. Payne	R	Hawaiʻi	Hilo
1	Thomas Pedro, Jr.	D	Hawaiʻi	Hilo
2	Francis K. Aona	R	Hawaiʻi	Kealakekua
2	Kenneth D. Bond	R	Hawaiʻi	Hawi
2	Esther K. Richardson	R	Hawaiʻi	Kealakekua
2	Robert L. Wilhelm	R	Hawaiʻi	Naalehu
3	Alfred A. Afat (Note: Afat was a resident of the island of Molokai which is a constituent island of the County of Maui.)	R	Maui	Hoolehua (Molokai)
3	William H. Engle	R	Maui	Kahului
3	Reuben Goodness	R	Maui	Wailuku
3	Joseph H. Kunewa	R	Maui	Wailuku
3	Manuel G. Paschoal	R	Maui	Wailuku
3	Henry P. Robinson, Jr.	R	Maui	Lahaina
4	James W. Glover	R	Oahu	Honolulu
4	Flora Kaai Hayes	R	Oahu	Honolulu
4	Richard K. Kimball	D	Oahu	Honolulu
4	Hebden Porteus	R	Oahu	Honolulu
4	Roy A. Vitousek	R	Oahu	Honolulu
4	Ralph E. Woolley	R	Oahu	Honolulu
5	Henry C. Akina	R	Oahu	Honolulu
5	Yew Char	D	Oahu	Honolulu
5	George H. Holt, Jr.	D	Oahu	Waianae
5	Charles E. Kauhane	D	Oahu	Honolulu
5	Kam Tai Lee	R	Oahu	Honolulu
5	Bina Mossman	R	Oahu	Honolulu
6	Nicholas A. Akana	R	Kauaʻi	Kalaheo
6	Randolph Crossley	R	Kauaʻi	Kapaa
6	Jacob K. Maka	R	Kauaʻi	Hanalei
6	A. Q. Marcallino	R	Kauaʻi	Eleele
