= Spreckelsville, Hawaii =

Unincorporated community in Hawaii, United States

Aerial view of Spreckelsville

Spreckelsville is an unincorporated community on the northeastern coast of the west side of the island of Maui in the U.S. state of Hawaii.

== Geography ==
It lies to the west of Paia and to the east of Kahului Airport. It is the home of the Maui Country Club. As of 2010, the population was 461.

=== Climate ===
The average amount of precipitation for the year in Spreckelsville is 22.6 in (570 mm). The month with the most precipitation on average is January, with 4.0 in (100 mm). The month with the least precipitation on average is June, with an average of 0.4 in (10 mm). There are an average of 112.0 days of precipitation, with the most precipitation occurring in March, with 13.0 days, and the least precipitation occurring in June, with 6.0 days.

== History ==
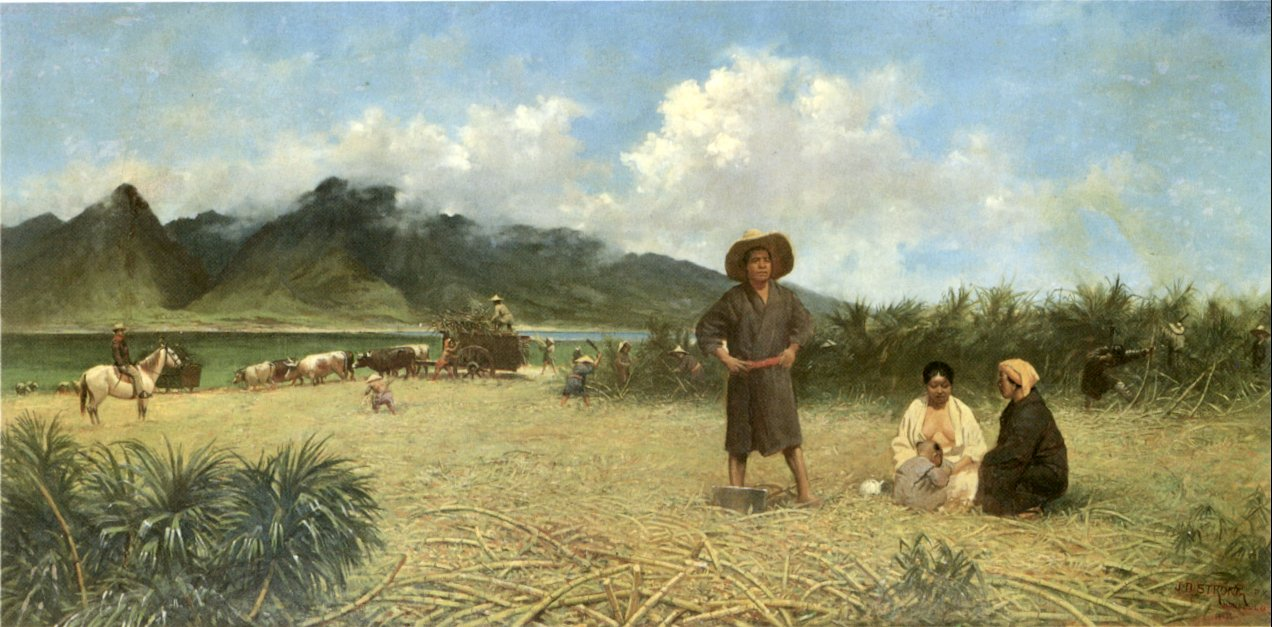
Japanese Laborers on Spreckelsville Plantation, Maui, oil on canvas painting by Joseph Dwight Strong, 1885

Spreckelsville was founded in 1878 as a company town by German-American businessman Claus Spreckels, who later founded the Spreckels Sugar Company. Spreckels already ran the most successful sugar refinery in California (and was the namesake of the town of Spreckels in Monterey County, California). He arrived in Maui in 1876 after the passage of the Reciprocity Treaty of 1875, which gave freer access to market for sugar exported to the United States. Spreckels initially opposed the treaty, fearing that low tariffs on sugar would be detrimental to his business. After its passage, he resolved to establish his own plantations instead.

At the time, his rivals Henry Perrine Baldwin and Samuel Thomas Alexander were building the Hamakua ditch to irrigate their plantation in nearby Haliimaile. Spreckels intended to compete with them, but had neither any land nor any water rights.

Spreckels was able to purchase and lease 40,000 acres (160 km^{2}) of land and became friends with Walter M. Gibson, adviser to King Kalākaua. Together, they made arrangements where Spreckels would loan the king money and in return, he and Gibson would increase the Spreckels' land holdings. Furthermore, the king had the Hawaiian legislature grant use of royal lands in fee. The royal government initially denied Spreckels' request for water rights, but Kalākaua dismissed his ministers and replaced them with others who would obey his orders. Spreckels then made a financial gift and loan to the government in return for water rights for 30 years. These political machinations on his behalf earned Spreckels the nicknames "the sugar king of Hawaii" and "His Royal Saccharinity". He was also granted the rights to the Hamakua ditch if Baldwin and Alexander could not complete it on schedule (they did).

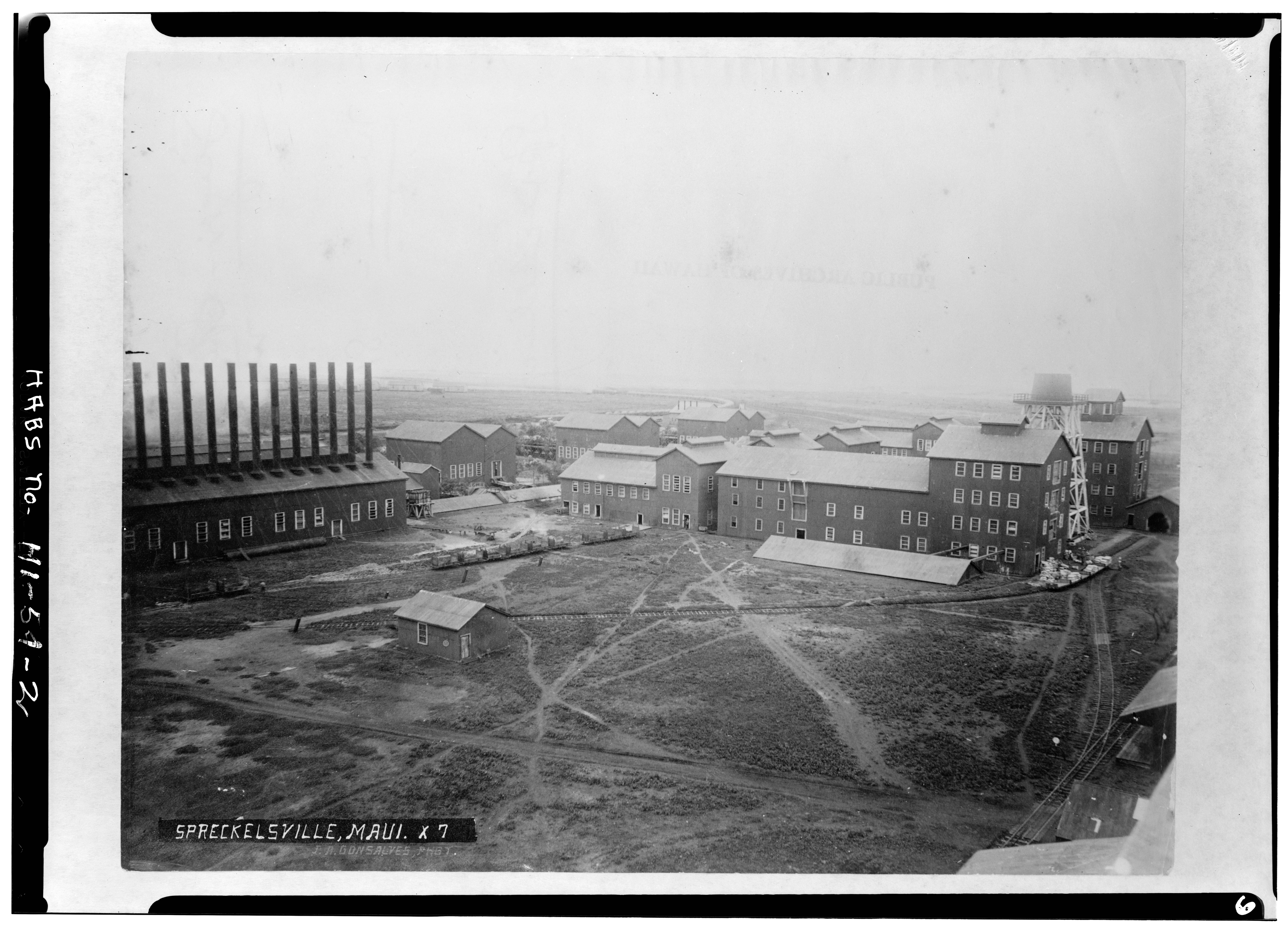
Sugar mill in Spreckelsville, 1890

Spreckels then incorporated the Hawaiian Commercial and Sugar Company (HC&S) with Hermann Schussler, chief engineer of California's Spring Valley Water Works, and others, which joined the "Big Five" to become one of the most powerful entities in Hawaii. The HC&S built the "Haiku ditch" to deliver 50 million gallons (190 million liters) of water over 30 miles (48 km) daily to his plantation lands, crossing ravines several hundred feet deep, surpassing the Hamakua ditch in volume and scope. Other technological advancements included using electric lighting to allow the plant to operate deep into the night, construction of a sugar mill that was capable of processing 20 tons of sugar per hour, and being the first plantation to use rail to transport sugarcane from the fields to the mill. The Haiku ditch, the Hamakua ditch, and the Lowrie ditch (built in 1900 for the plantation) are part of the East Maui Irrigation System, which has been recognized as a Historical Civil Engineering Landmark by the American Society of Civil Engineers.

By 1892, Spreckelsville was the largest sugarcane plantation in the world, and employed thousands of immigrant farm laborers from Japan, Korea, China, and other countries, who often lived in squalid conditions. These camps no longer exist and the land they were on has been reclaimed for sugar crops.

However, Spreckels began suffering setbacks after falling out of Kalākaua's favor in 1886. (Note: Both the king and Gibson were in debt to Spreckels due to gambling and tired of his demands. Kalākaua was able to secure a loan from a London creditor and paid off his debt to Spreckels, freeing him of the latter's influence.) Besides Alexander & Baldwin (A&B), the HC&S faced new competition from the California and Hawaiian Sugar Company, which grew to become one of largest sugar refineries in the world. Other problems included deterioration of the Spreckelsville facilities and the annexation of Hawaii by the United States, which brought an end to contract laborers. A&B then gained control of the HC&S in 1898, forcing Spreckels out.

Alexander & Baldwin closed the by-then outdated mill at Spreckelsville in 1902, shifting HC&S factory operations to the newly constructed mill at Puʻunene. Later in the century, as tourism displaced sugar as Maui's primary industry, A&B gradually sold off the desirable coastal lands to real estate developers and Spreckelsville became a residential and vacation rental community.

Kahului Airport began operating in 1952, with its main runway immediately to the southwest of Spreckelsville, leading to issues with airport noise pollution in the community.

== Beaches ==
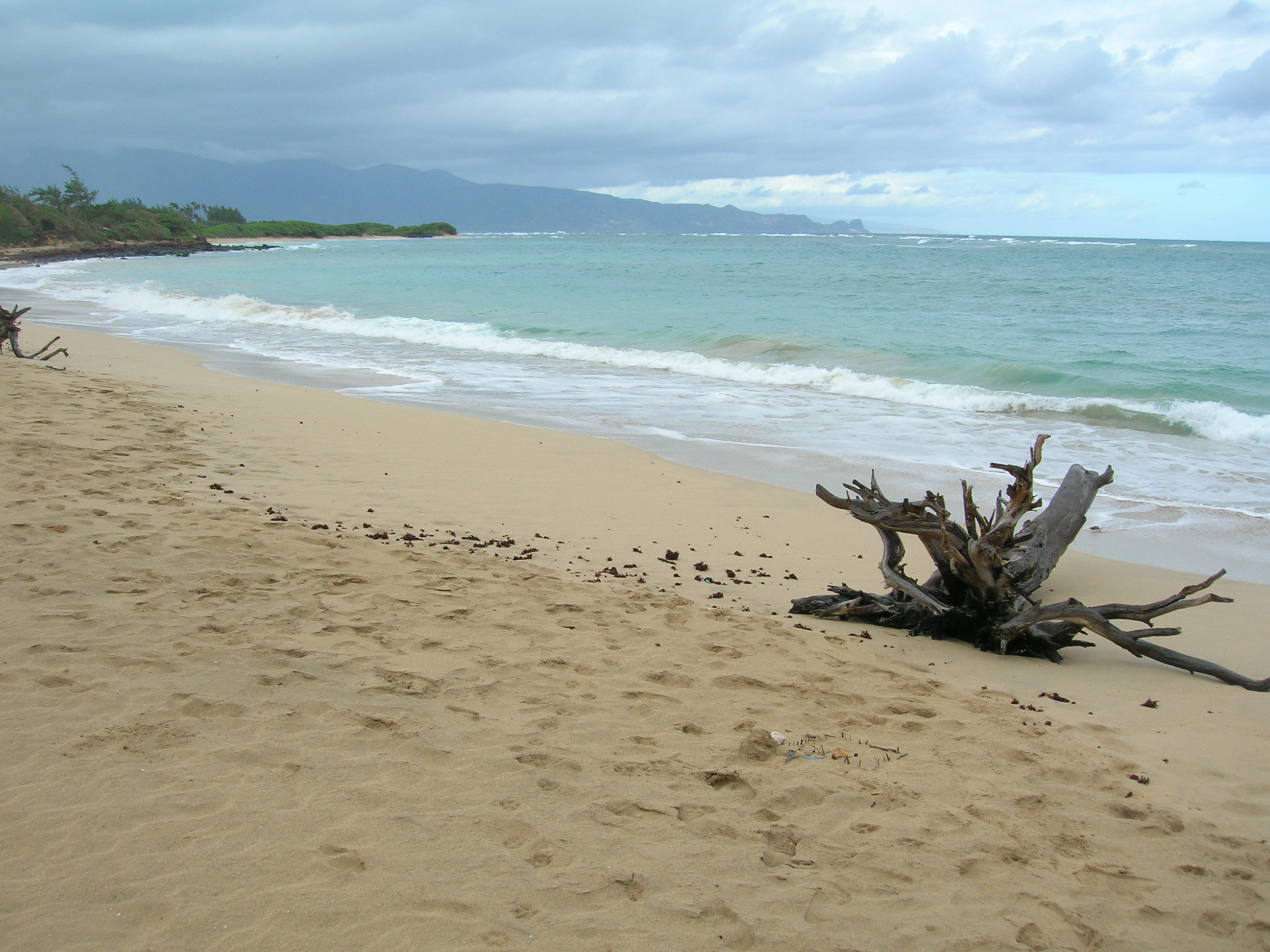
Driftwood on Spreckelsville Beach

Spreckelsville Beach is the historic name for approximately two miles (3.2 km) in length from Kanaha Beach Park on the west in Kahului to Maui Country Club on the east. The beach is not one continuous stretch of sand, but is broken up into sections by lava, boulders, and groins. The different sections of the beach are now known by separate names. From west to east, they are:

- Camp One (20.909835°N 156.423458°W) is named after one of the sugarcane plantation camps and is located at the westernmost end of Spreckelsville Beach at the end of the Kahului Airport runway. As a result, the Federal Aviation Administration has banned kitesurfing in this location. It is also where a small number of Maui's homeless population lives. Beachgoers can reach Camp One via an access road off the western end of Stable Rd.
- Sprecks Beach (20.907695°N 156.416174°W) is popular among European windsurfers, and as such is also known as Euro Beach. There is a small area where cars may be parked at the end of a dirt road leading from Stable Rd.
- Lobster Cove (20.907791°N 156.412946°W) is only publicly accessible by foot from Sprecks Beach or Sugar Cove.
- Sugar Cove (20.909420°N 156.409840°W) is fronted by private condominiums, but there is a public access path with limited parking at the end of Paani Place.
- Baby Beach (20.912742°N 156.402228°W) was an ancient Hawaiian burial site. It is separated from the rest of Spreckelsville Beach by shoreline features and thus is generally now considered to be distinct from it. In fact, it is the western end of a one-mile (1.6 km) portion of beach that stretches to Baldwin Beach Park in Paia. An exposed reef creates a lagoon that makes the beach popular with families. It is served by a parking area at the end of Kealakai Place.

== See also ==
- Spreckels, California - former company town built at the site of Claus Spreckels beet sugar factory.
