= Hoʻokena beach =

Beach and village in South Kona District, Hawaii

Hoʻokena is a beach location and village in Kauhako Bay, South Kona that is now known for a beach park, but was formerly a steamer port. Hoʻokena grew from a fishing village to a significant port town by the late 19th century, second only to Kailua-Kona.

== As seen by Stevenson ==
"Hoʻokena is its name. ..On the immediate foreshore, under a low cliff, there stood some score of houses, trellised and verandaed in green and white; the whole surrounded and shaded by a grove of coco palms and fruit trees, springing as by a miracle from the bare lava. .. In front, the population of the neighborhood were gathered for the weekly incident, the passage of the steamer, sixty to eighty strong and attended by a disproportionate allowance of horses, mules, and donkeys..." Robert Louis Stevenson Travels in Hawaiʻi

== Storm damage and desertion ==
The port village was struck repeatedly by storms and from the 1930s residents moved further north up the hill. By 1959 a travel journalist could record: "In the deserted homes of Hookena hand-carved chests of drawers and tables were left behind. The bell-rope still dangles, but a strong pull on it might bring the termite-riddled steeple crashing into the church. The steeple did collapse in 1983.
