= Hāliʻimaile, Hawaii =

Hāliʻimaile
- Census-designated place
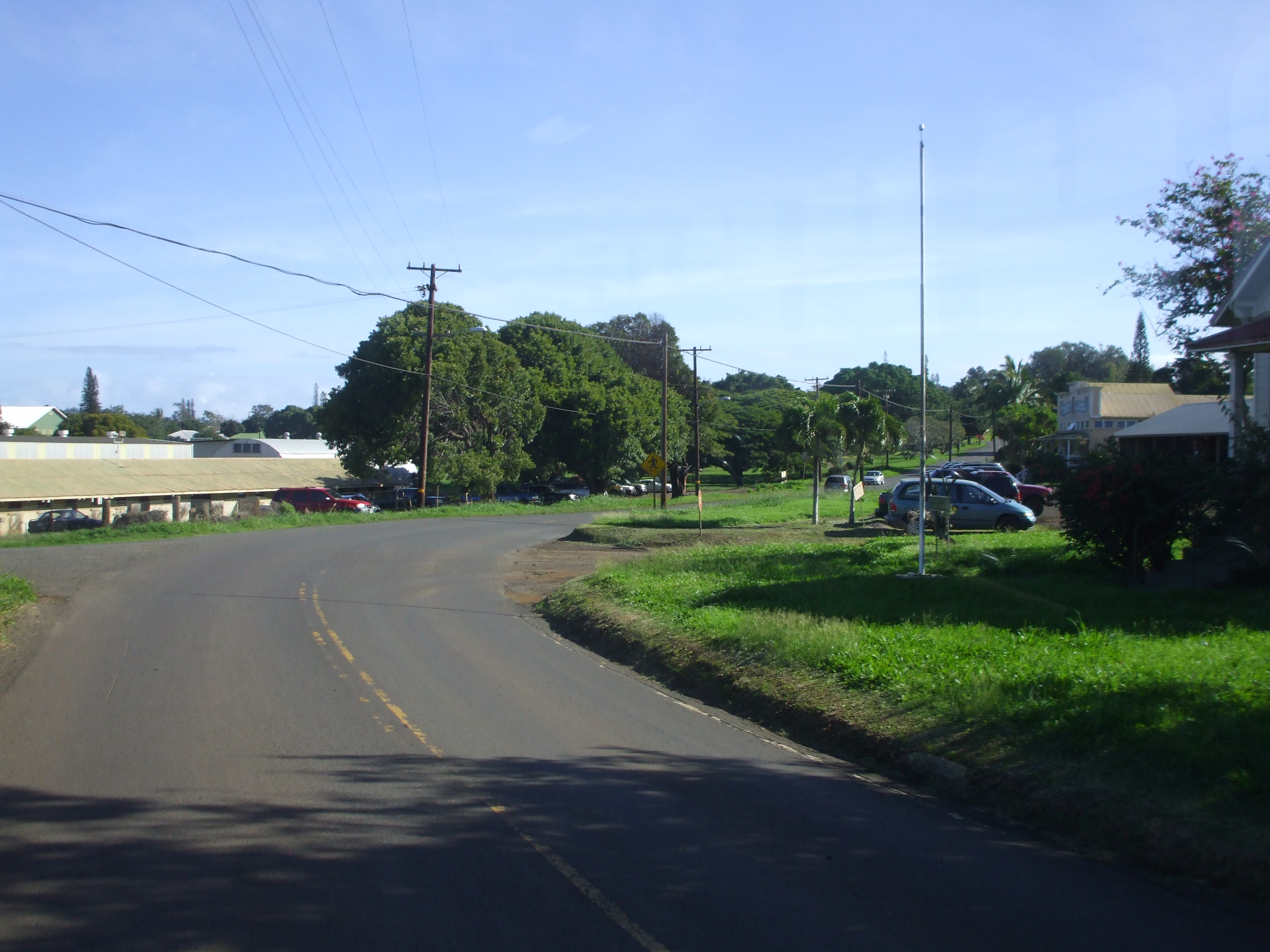
- County Route 371 going thru Haliimaile

- Location in Maui County and the state of Hawaii
- Coordinates: 20°52′31″N 156°20′32″W
- Country: United States
- State: Hawaii
- County: Maui

Area
  - Total: 3.47 sq mi (9.00 km^{2})
  - Land: 3.45 sq mi (8.93 km^{2})
  - Water: 0.027 sq mi (0.07 km^{2})
- Elevation: 1,001 ft (305 m)

Population (2020)
  - Total: 1,074
  - Density: 311.3/sq mi (120.21/km^{2})
- Time zone: UTC-10 (Hawaii-Aleutian)
- ZIP code: 96768
- Area code: 808
- FIPS code: 15-10900
- GNIS feature ID: 0358989

Hāliʻimaile (Hawaiian for 'maile vines strewn') is a census-designated place (CDP) in Maui County, Hawaii, United States. The population was 1,074 at the 2020 census.

== Geography ==
Hāliʻimaile is located at 20°52′31″N 156°20′32″W (20.875211, -156.342340).

According to the United States Census Bureau, the CDP has a total area of 3.5 square miles (9.0 km^{2}), of which 3.4 square miles (8.9 km^{2}) is land and 0.03 square miles (0.07 km^{2}), or 0.76%, is water.

== Demographics ==
Historical population
Census	Pop.	Note	%±
2020	1,074		—
U.S. Decennial Census

As of the census of 2000, there were 895 people, 254 households, and 193 families residing in the CDP. The population density was 534.0 inhabitants per square mile (206.2/km^{2}). There were 260 housing units at an average density of 155.1 per square mile (59.9/km^{2}). The racial makeup of the CDP was 16.65% White, 0.56% Native American, 40.89% Asian, 16.31% Pacific Islander, 0.22% from other races, and 25.36% from two or more races. Hispanic or Latino of any race were 6.26% of the population.

There were 254 households, out of which 30.3% had children under the age of 18 living with them, 52.8% were married couples living together, 12.6% had a female householder with no husband present, and 24.0% were non-families. 17.7% of all households were made up of individuals, and 7.1% had someone living alone who was 65 years of age or older. The average household size was 3.52 and the average family size was 3.84.

In the CDP the population was spread out, with 22.7% under the age of 18, 11.5% from 18 to 24, 28.8% from 25 to 44, 19.9% from 45 to 64, and 17.1% who were 65 years of age or older. The median age was 36 years. For every 100 females, there were 105.3 males. For every 100 females age 18 and over, there were 102.3 males.

The median income for a household in the CDP was $49,167, and the median income for a family was $49,792. Males had a median income of $20,536 versus $22,250 for females. The per capita income for the CDP was $16,638. About 4.4% of families and 7.3% of the population were below the poverty line, including 6.2% of those under age 18 and 14.4% of those age 65 or over.
