= Elsie Hart Wilcox =

American politician (1879–1954)

Member of the Senate of the Territory of Hawaii
- In office 1932–1940

Personal details
- Born: March 22, 1879 Grove Farm, Hawaii
- Died: June 30, 1954 (aged 75)

Elsie Hart Wilcox (March 22, 1879 – June 30, 1954) was the first woman to serve in the Senate of the Territory of Hawaii. Dedicated to public service, she rose up through the Mokihana Club on Kauai, prior to the August 26, 1920 passage of the Nineteenth Amendment to the United States Constitution which gave women the legal right to vote. She was the descendant of missionaries who arrived in Hawaii during the 19th century, and was the sister of pioneer nurse Mabel Wilcox. Although born into an economically privileged family, she spent her adult life championing public school teachers, and volunteering in community services.

== Family background ==
She was born March 22, 1879, in the Kingdom of Hawaii, on Grove Farm on the island of Kauai, one of six children of Samuel Whitney Wilcox (1847–1929) and Emma Washburn Lyman Wilcox (1849–1934). Her mother was a seminary student in Chicago in 1871 when the Great Chicago Fire occurred. Her father was a Kauai sugar planter, manager of a cattle ranch, and sheriff of Kauai for 25 years.

Maternal grandparents David Belden Lyman (1803–1884) and Sarah Joiner Lyman (1805–1885), as well as paternal grandparents Abner Wilcox (1808–1869) and Lucy Eliza Hart Wilcox (1814–1869), had been sent to Hawaii by the American Board of Commissioners for Foreign Missions in Massachusetts. She was the niece of businessmen George Norton Wilcox and Albert Spencer Wilcox.

Elsie was raised in financially privileged circumstances, and was one of six children in a family of high-achieving siblings. Her sister Lucy Etta Wilcox Sloggett (1877–1933) married Kauai sugar planter Henry Digby Sloggett (1876–1938) in 1903, Lucy was a civic leader on Kauai, and also the World War I secretary of the Maui chapter of the American Red Cross. Another one of Elsie's sisters, Mabel Isabel Wilcox (1882–1978), served with the Red Cross in Europe during World War I, and was decorated by Elisabeth of Bavaria, Queen of Belgium and by the Mayor of Le Havre. Mabel was instrumental in instituting public nursing services on Kauai and in getting a hospital built on the island. Elsie's brother Ralph Lyman Wilcox (1876–1913) was a plantation overseer on Kauai; brother Charles Henry Wilcox (1880–1920) served in the Hawaii National Guard, managed sugar plantations, and had been a representative in the territorial legislature; brother Gaylord Parke Wilcox (1881–1970) was Chairman of the Board of Grove Farm, Ltd.

She attended Punahou School and graduated in 1902 from Wellesley College in Massachusetts. After college, she had a brief sojourn in Europe. In 1907, she and her sister Mabel accompanied their uncle George Norton Wilcox on a tour of Asia. Mabel, Elsie, and their parents toured Canada and the American states along the Atlantic seaboard in 1909.

== Civic involvement ==
Wilcox was a founding member and first president of the Mokihana Literary Club in 1905, organized with the express purpose of, " ...the study and discussion of various governments of the world." Before the 1920 adoption of the Nineteenth Amendment to the United States Constitution, in which women gained the right to vote, women used the power of clubs to effect social reforms. Later shortened to the Mokihana Club, the members broadened the club's scope to include women's suffrage, current events, public health and education, music and the arts, literature (they had their own library), and environmental conservation. Speakers from a wide spectrum were brought in, and civic involvement was encouraged. Twenty years after the club's founding, it had been so varied and far-reaching in its influence that the Honolulu Star-Bulletin ran a four-part series to cover their accomplishments.

Wilcox's own civic activities went hand-in-hand with the goals of the Mokihana Club. She became Secretary-Treasurer of the Kauai Historical Society in 1914, a membership she held until her death. During World War I, she was chairman of the Kauai Branch of the Women's Committee of the Territorial Food Commission. Elsie headed the International Institute of the Y.W.C.A. in Honolulu, established in 1919 to help curb the school drop-out ratio among immigrant non-English-speaking girls. In 1927 she became a director of Bishop Trust Company, retaining that position the rest of her life.

== Political office ==
Wilcox was appointed chairman of the Kauai Board of Child Welfare in 1920. That same year, territorial governor Charles J. McCarthy appointed her to fill a vacancy on the Board of Commissioners of Public Instruction from Kauai. She strongly objected to the 1932 resolution for reduction of hundreds of teaching jobs, joined in the opposition only by superintendent of instruction Will C. Crawford. Shortly after its passage, she ran on the Republican ticket for Territory of Hawaii senator from Kauai. In newspaper coverage of her candidacy, her focus on education and community involvement was noted, as was her concern for world peace.

Her election victory gave her the distinction of being the first woman elected to the Senate of the Territory of Hawaii. Committee assignments for her during her first term were Judiciary, Education, Health, Public Lands and one of the "Chairmen of special committees of the senate". She was re-elected in 1934, and served on the Judiciary, Education and Rules committees. Her 1936 and 1938 re-elections allowed her to introduce legislation to equalize the pay standard for teachers, and help push the amended version through the legislature. Her 1940 re-election bid resulted in a primary defeat.

== Later years ==
Sisters Mabel, Lucy and Elsie restored the old Waioli Mission House in 1921. After Lucy's death in 1933, Mabel and Elsie became the sole owners and opened it to the public as a museum.

During World War II, Wilcox became the Kauai branch chairman of the United Service Organizations. After the war, Governor Oren E. Long appointed her to the territorial commission on historical sites. She then became ex officio chairman of the Kauai County advisory committee of historical sites. She also supported the Women's Board of Missions as extension chairman of Kauai .

For the remainder of her life, Elsie continued to hold membership and positions in a number of civic and political organizations. After prolonged health issues, Elsie Wilcox died at age 75, on June 30, 1954. Although she had spent her life as a public personality, her last wishes were for her funeral to be a private affair attended only by her family.

== Sources ==
- Hawaiian Mission Children's Society (1901). American Protestant Missionaries to Hawaii. Hawaiian Mission Children's Society – via HathiTrust.
- Judd, Henry P.; Hilleary, Perry Edward (1954). Men and women of Hawaii, 1954; a biographical encyclopedia of persons of notable achievement, an historical account of the peoples who have distinguished themselves through personal success and through public service. Honolulu, HI: Honolulu Business Consultants. pp. 696–697 – via HathiTrust.
- Peterson, Barbara Bennett, ed. (1984). Notable women of Hawaii. Honolulu: University of Hawaii Press. pp. 403–405. ISBN 978-0-8248-0820-4.
