= Pāʻia, Hawaii =

Pāʻia
- Census-designated place
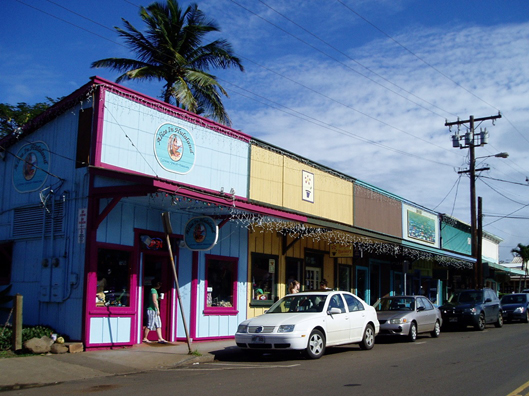
- Downtown Pāʻia

- Location in Maui County and the state of Hawaii
- Coordinates: 20°54′38″N 156°22′35″W
- Country: United States
- State: Hawaii
- County: Maui

Area
  - Total: 7.46 sq mi (19.33 km^{2})
  - Land: 6.13 sq mi (15.88 km^{2})
  - Water: 1.33 sq mi (3.45 km^{2})
- Elevation: 230 ft (70 m)

Population (2020)
  - Total: 2,470
  - Density: 402.9/sq mi (155.56/km^{2})
- Time zone: UTC-10 (Hawaii-Aleutian)
- ZIP code: 96779
- Area code: 808
- FIPS code: 15-60200
- GNIS feature ID: 0362968

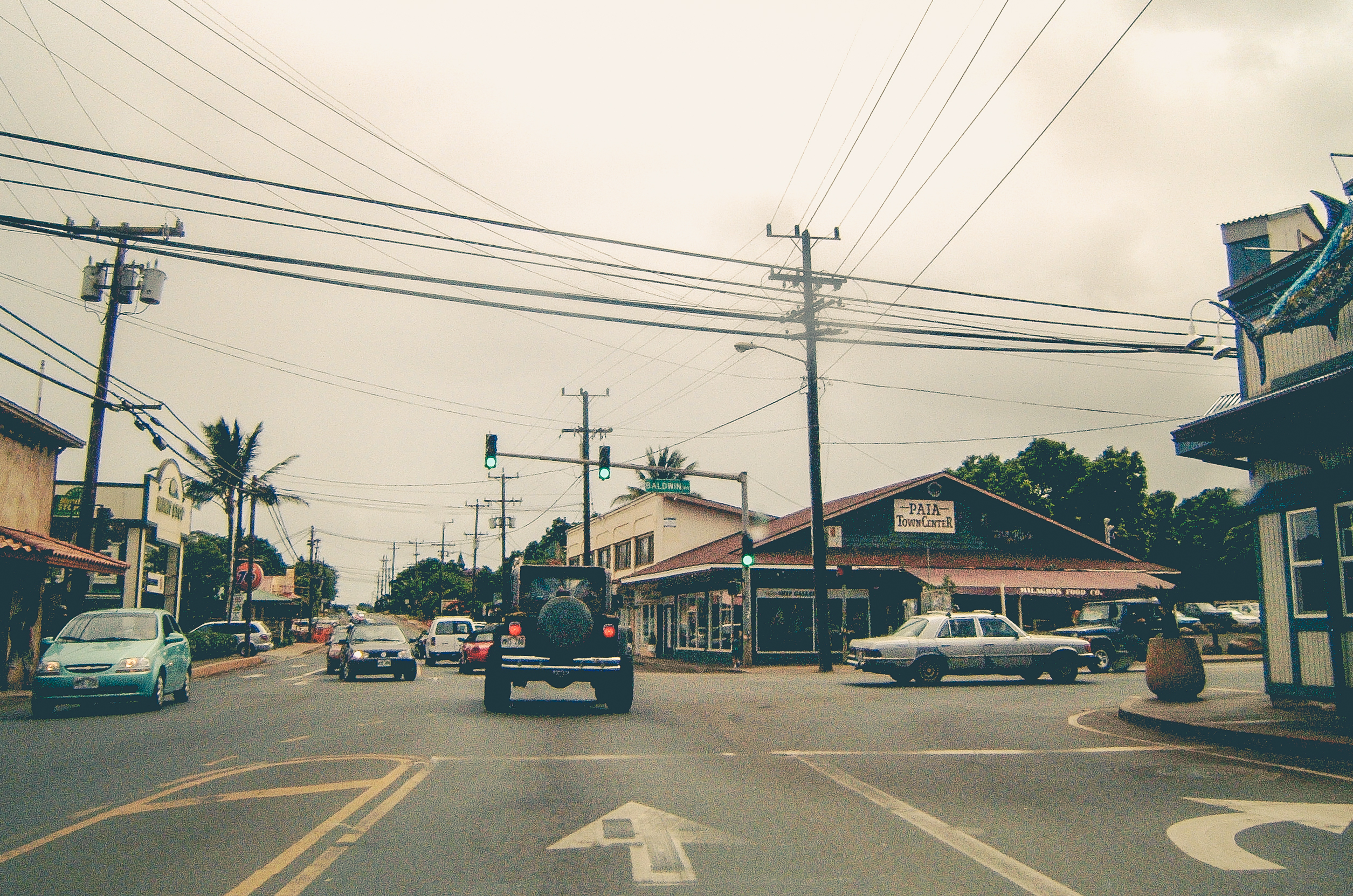
Paia, Maui. Intersection of Baldwin Ave and Hana Hwy.

Pāʻia ([paːˈʔijə], lit. 'noisy') is a census-designated place (CDP) in Maui County, Hawaii, United States, on the northern coast of the island of Maui. The population was 2,470 at the 2020 census. Pāʻia is home to several restaurants, art galleries, surf shops and other tourist-oriented businesses. It was formerly home to a Hawaiian Commercial & Sugar Company mill from 1880 to 2000.

Pāʻia is the first town on the Hana Highway when heading eastbound towards Hana.

Pāʻia is located close to many internationally known windsurfing spots including Hoʻokipa and Spreckelsville. It is therefore sometimes called "The World Capital of Windsurfing".

== Geography ==
Paia is located at 20°54′38″N 156°22′35″W (20.910694, -156.376340). Spreckelsville lies to the west, Haiku to the east, and Haliimaile to the south.

According to the United States Census Bureau, the CDP has a total area of 7.5 square miles (19.3 km^{2}), of which 6.1 square miles (15.9 km^{2}) is land and 1.3 square miles (3.4 km^{2}), or 17.84%, is water.

== Demographics ==
Historical population
Census	Pop.	Note	%±
2000	2,499		—
2010	2,668		6.8%
2020	2,470		−7.4%
U.S. Decennial Census

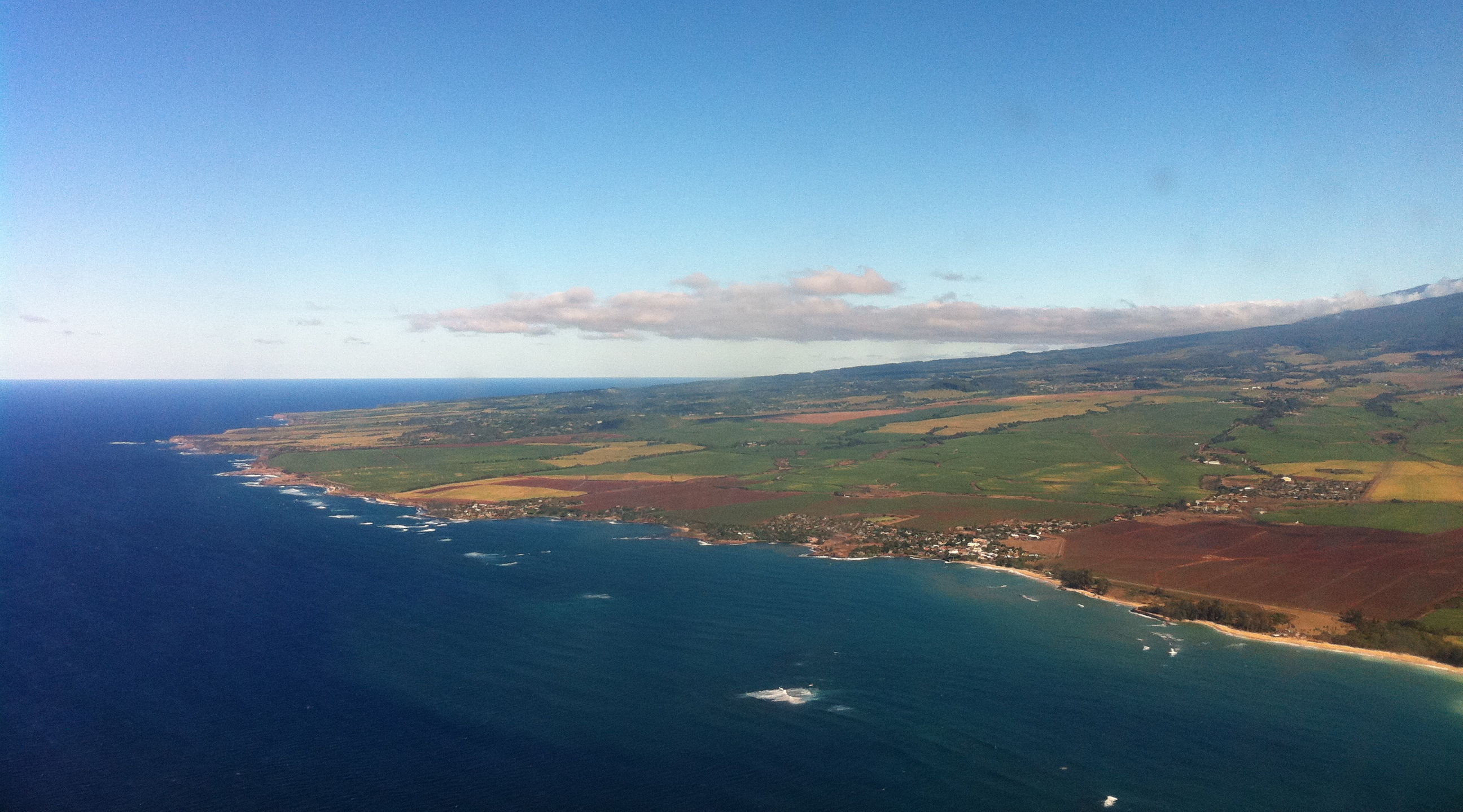
North Shore Maui with Paia and Haiku neighborhoods

As of the census of 2000, there were 2,499 people, 783 households, and 551 families residing in the CDP. The population density was 410.8 inhabitants per square mile (158.6/km^{2}). There were 890 housing units at an average density of 146.3 per square mile (56.5/km^{2}). The racial makeup of the CDP was 33.45% White, 0.32% African American, 0.60% Native American, 27.13% Asian, 8.80% Pacific Islander, 1.24% from other races, and 28.45% from two or more races. Hispanic or Latino of any race were 10.92% of the population.

There were 783 households, out of which 35.4% had children under the age of 18 living with them, 50.2% were married couples living together, 13.4% had a female householder with no husband present, and 29.6% were non-families. 18.6% of all households were made up of individuals, and 5.4% had someone living alone who was 65 years of age or older. The average household size was 3.10 and the average family size was 3.58.

In the CDP the population was spread out, with 26.6% under the age of 18, 10.8% from 18 to 24, 32.2% from 25 to 44, 22.0% from 45 to 64, and 8.5% who were 65 years of age or older. The median age was 34 years. For every 100 females, there were 104.2 males. For every 100 females age 18 and over, there were 104.3 males.

The median income for a household in the CDP was $51,696, and the median income for a family was $57,981. Males had a median income of $31,302 versus $27,500 for females. The per capita income for the CDP was $18,644. About 6.0% of families and 8.9% of the population were below the poverty line, including 7.4% of those under age 18 and 2.0% of those age 65 or over.

== Gallery ==
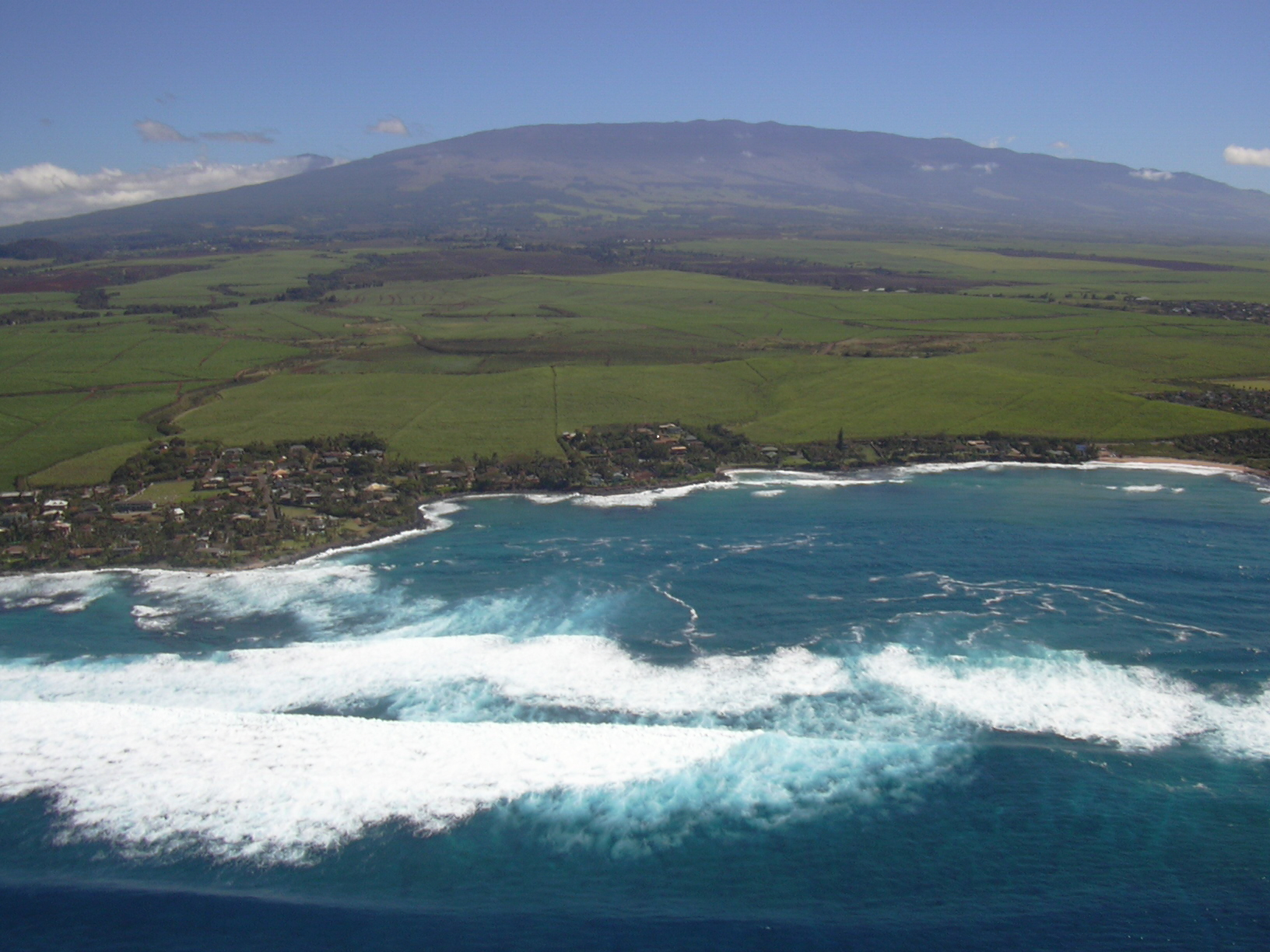

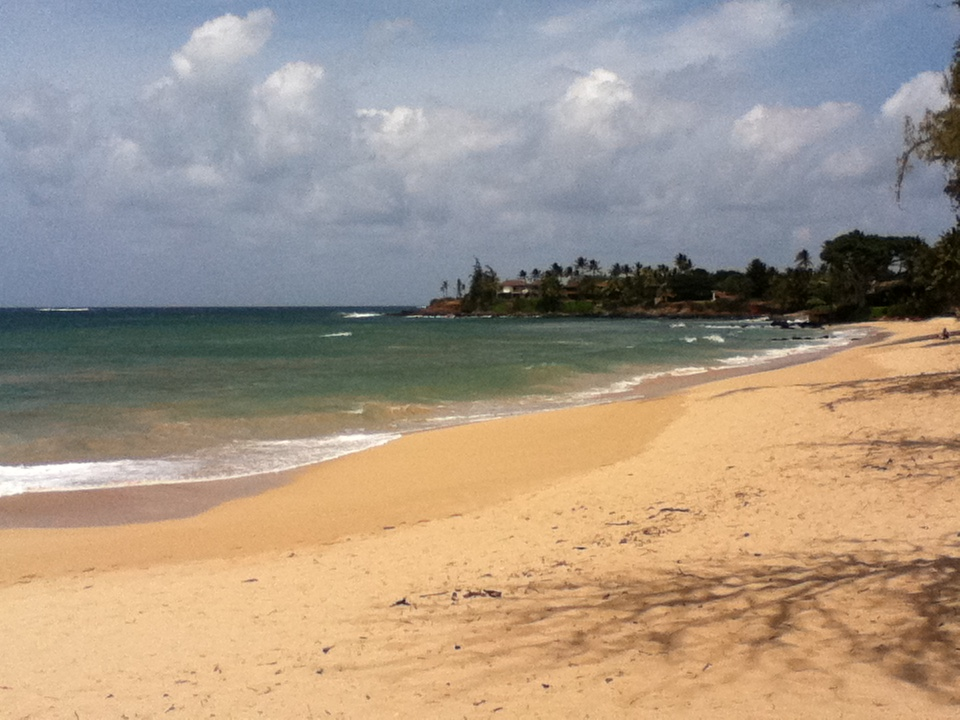
Paia beach looking east

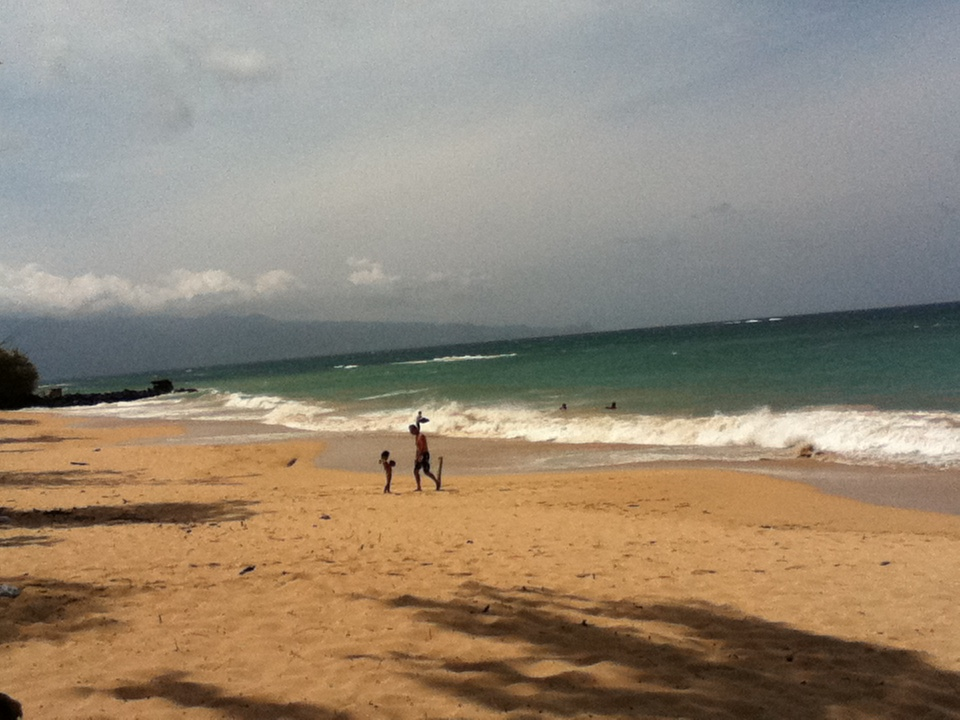
Paia beach looking west

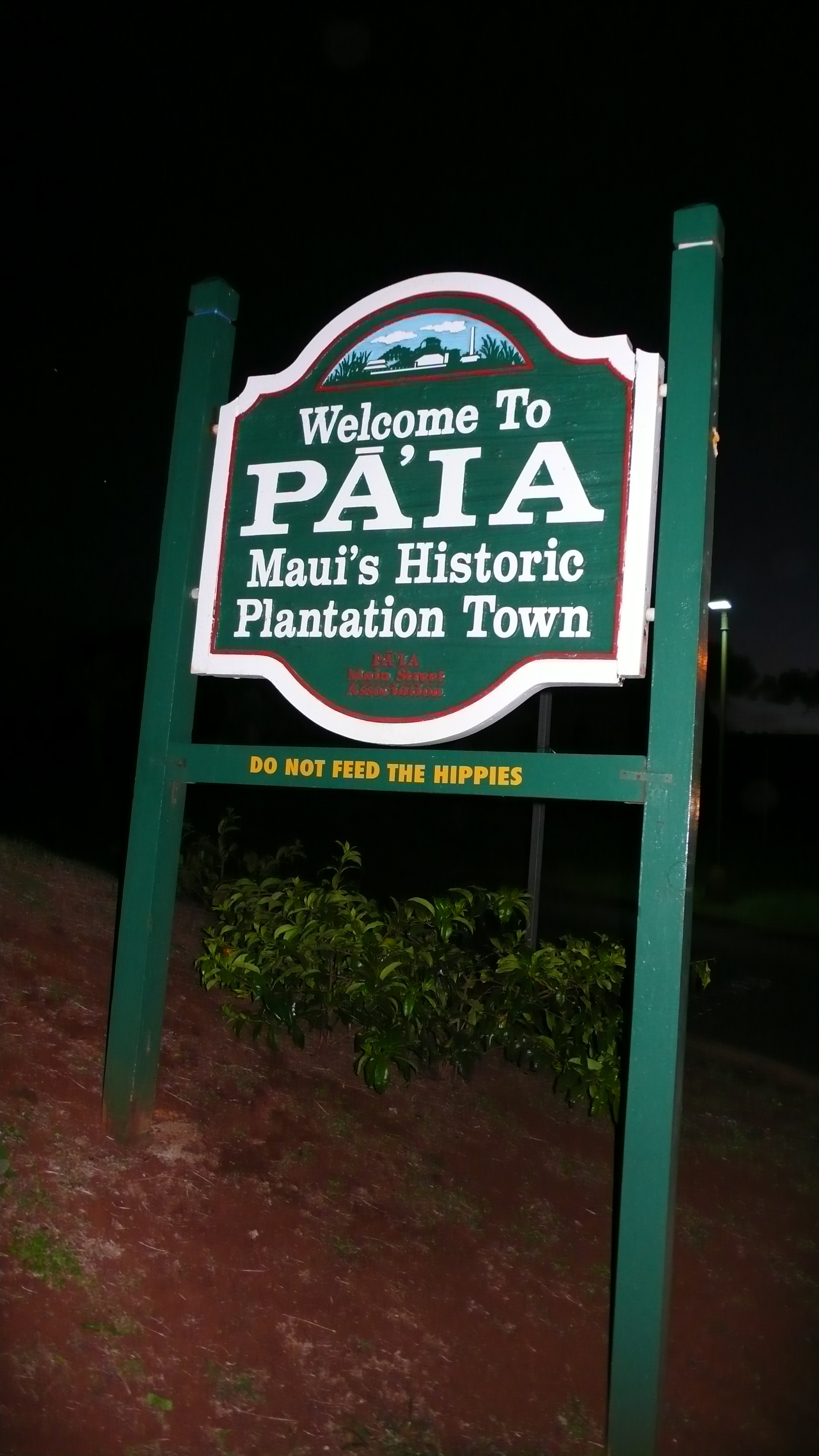
Paia welcome sign
