= Waiʻōhinu, Hawaii =

Unincorporated community in Hawaii, U.S.

Waiʻōhinu
- Census-designated place
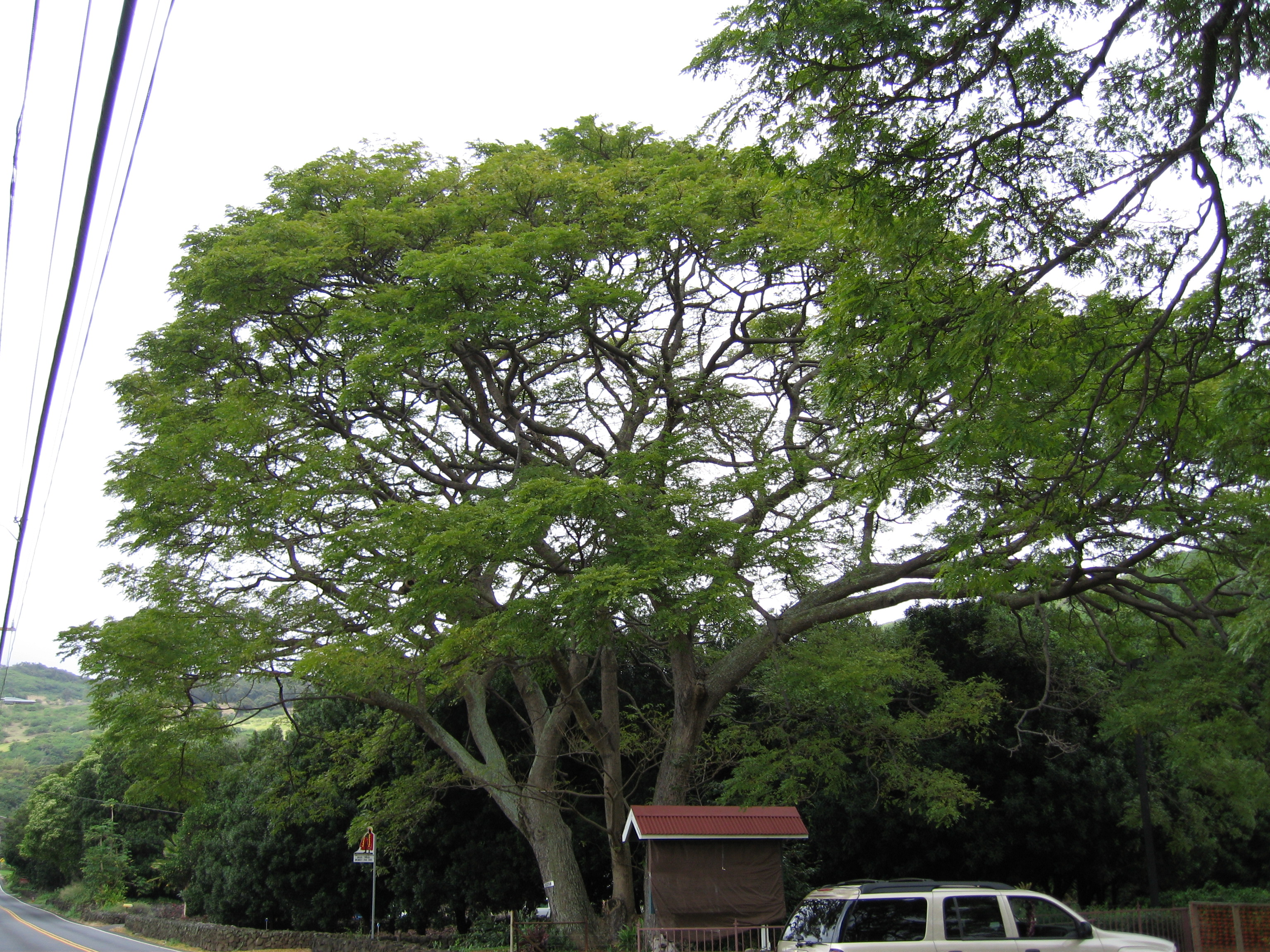
- Mark Twain monkeypod tree

- Location within Hawaii
- Coordinates: 19°4′3″N 155°36′41″W
- Country: United States
- State: Hawaii
- County: Hawaiʻi

Area
  - Total: 1.34 sq mi (3.46 km^{2})
  - Land: 1.34 sq mi (3.46 km^{2})
  - Water: 0 sq mi (0.00 km^{2})
- Elevation: 1,055 ft (322 m)

Population (2020)
  - Total: 198
  - Density: 148.2/sq mi (57.23/km^{2})
- Time zone: UTC-10 (Hawaiʻi-Aleutian)
- Area code: 808
- FIPS code: 15-79550
- GNIS feature ID: 0364822

Waiʻōhinu (Hawaiian for "Shiny Water") is an unincorporated community and census-designated place (CDP) in the district of Kaʻu on the Big Island of Hawaiʻi, in the U.S. state of Hawaiʻi. Waiʻōhinu is the name of the community as well as the ahupua'a, Native Hawaiian subdivision. As of the 2020 census, the CDP had a population of 198.

== Demographics ==
As of the 2020 American Community Survey, Waiʻōhinu had a population of 220 residents, of whom 50 were Native Hawaiian or other Pacific Islanders, 39 were Asian, 31 were white, and 100 were two or more races. 21 residents were Hispanic or Latino of any race.

Historical population
Census	Pop.	Note	%±
2020	198		—
U.S. Decennial Census

== Location ==
Waiʻōhinu is at the far southern tip of the island of Hawaiʻi, on Hawaiʻi Route 11, which is part of the Hawaiʻi Belt Road. It is 57 miles (92 km) southeast of Kailua-Kona and 32 miles (51 km) southwest of Hawaiʻi Volcanoes National Park.

Waiohinu's ZIP code is 96772, which it shares with the nearby community of Nāʻālehu.

According to the U.S. Census Bureau, the Waiʻōhinu CDP has an area of 1.4 square miles (3.5 km^{2}), all of it land.

== Landmarks ==
Mark Twain visited Waiʻōhinu in 1866 and, legend has it, planted a monkey pod tree (Albizia saman) here. The tree blew down in 1957, but a shoot from it was replanted, and remains growing there today.

Kauahaʻao Church was built in 1888 by Calvinist missionaries in Waiʻōhinu. The historic wooden church building was demolished in April 1998 because of extensive termite damage.

Wong Yuen Store was built in 1914 by Chinese immigrant Wong Yuen. It is currently the only store in operation in Waiʻōhinu.
