= Kaʻū, Hawaii =

District of Hawaii County, Hawaii, US

Kaʻū district highlighted

Kaʻū is the southernmost and largest district (922 square miles (2,390 km^{2})) of Hawaiʻi County, Hawaii, located on the island of Hawaiʻi.

Kaʻū was one of the six original districts of ancient Hawaii on the island, known as moku. It includes the areas of South Point (Ka Lae), Hawaiian Ocean View, Nīnole, Waiʻōhinu, Nāʻālehu and Pāhala.

The district contains much of Hawaiʻi Volcanoes National Park, including the volcanoes Kīlauea and Mauna Loa, and Punaluʻu (Black Sand) Beach, Papakōlea (Green Sand) Beach and Kamilo Beach. To the east of Kaʻū is the Puna District, and to the west is the South Kona District.

== History ==
=== Sugar cane era begins ===
The largest commerce in Kaʻū was sugar and leading the industry during its prime was Hawaiian Agriculture Co and Hutchinson Sugar Plantation Co.

Hawaiian Agriculture Co was established in 1876 but did not start producing sugar cane until 1880. Locally, it was known as the Pahala Plantation but legally the corporation was filed as the Hawaiian Agricultural Co. The company employed many workers including immigrants from Philippines, Japan, Portugal, and others. Corporate housing projects were built to provide living quarters for staff and added to the community of Pahala. The founders were Peter C. Jones, Charles R. Bishop, J.D. Brewer, and H.A.P. Carter.

The Hutchinson Sugar Plantation Co was established in 1868 by Alexander Hutchinson and it was one of the oldest sugar companies on the Big Island. Shortly, the plantation was renamed Naalehu Sugar Plantation. In his honor, following Hutchinson's death in 1873, William G. Irwin and Claus Spreckels purchased the plantation and renamed it Hutchinson Sugar Plantation. The company purchased Hilea Sugar Plantation in 1890. In 1910, it was purchased by C. Brewer & Co. Just like its competitor, Hawaiian Agriculture Co, the company employed many locals including immigrants from Philippines, Japan, Portugal, and others. Corporate housing projects were built to provide living quarters for staff and added to the community of Na'alehu.

=== Sugar cane era concludes ===
In 1972, Hawaiian Agricultural Co. merged with Hutchinson Sugar Plantation Co. The merged companies were renamed Kaʻū Sugar Co and was now the only sugar plantation in Kaʻū. However, this unified industry was short lived. After twenty four years, the sugar cane era finally came to an end with the Kaʻū Sugar Co closing operation in 1996.

The coffee industry has been low profile since the early 1900s. However, after the closure of the Kaʻū Sugar Co, interest in growing coffee has surged. Many of Kaʻū Sugar Co staff were given the option to acquire a land lease in five acre increments to engage in agriculture commerce. From the lease lots along with private owned lots, coffee were being grown. The most popular varietals that are grown in the area is Typica and Caturra.

Over the years, the coffee industry has been growing in importance, with the Kaʻū Coffee Festival held in Pāhala.

== Southernmost point ==
The southernmost point of any state in the United States is at Ka Lae Point in the Kaʻū District. It is almost the southernmost point in the whole country except that, technically, the United States Territory of Palmyra Island, although not part of a state within the US, is an incorporated territory (an integral part of the country) according to the doctrine of "incorporation" defined in the Supreme Court's Insular Cases; therefore Palmyra's south point on Holei Island at 5°52′15″ N latitude is officially the southernmost point in the United States of America, not Ka Lae Point.

== Gallery ==
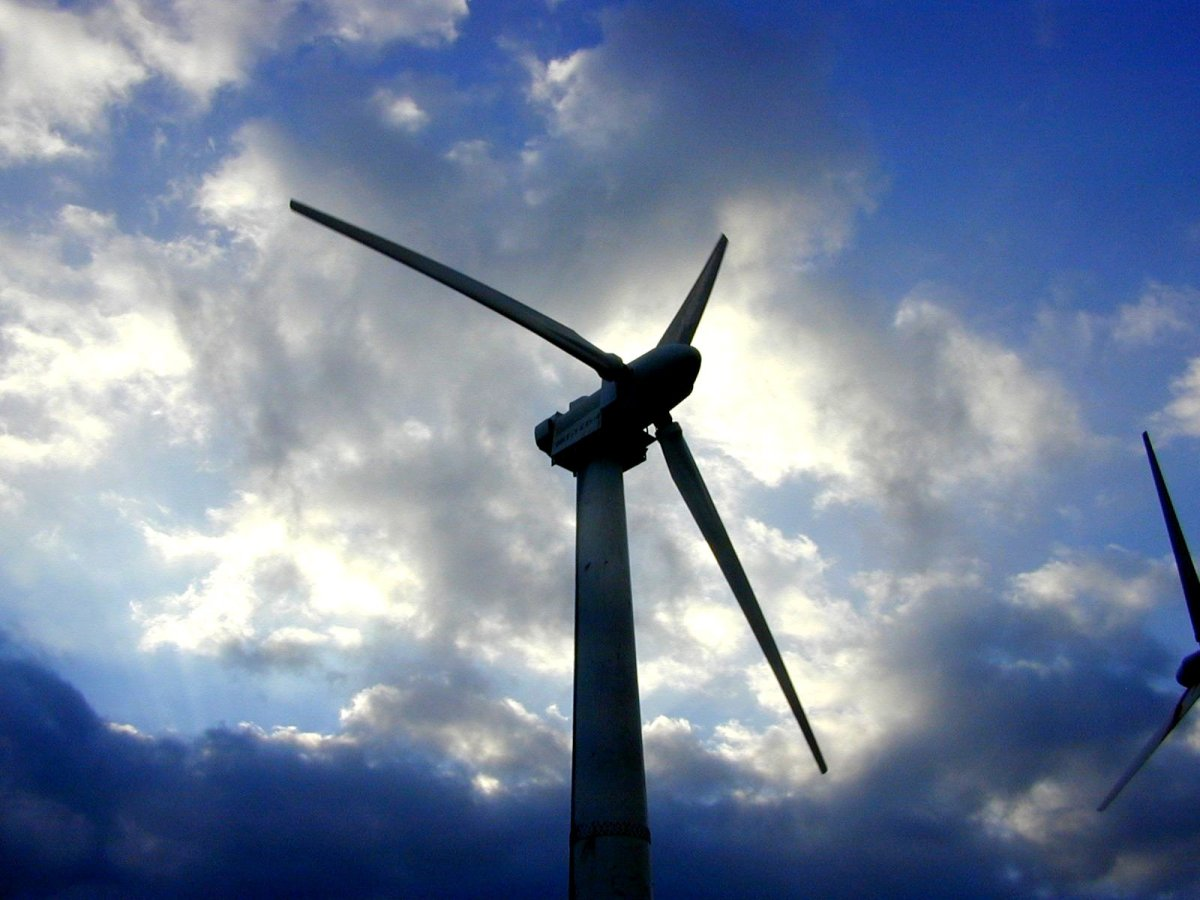
South Point Wind Farm in Kaʻū

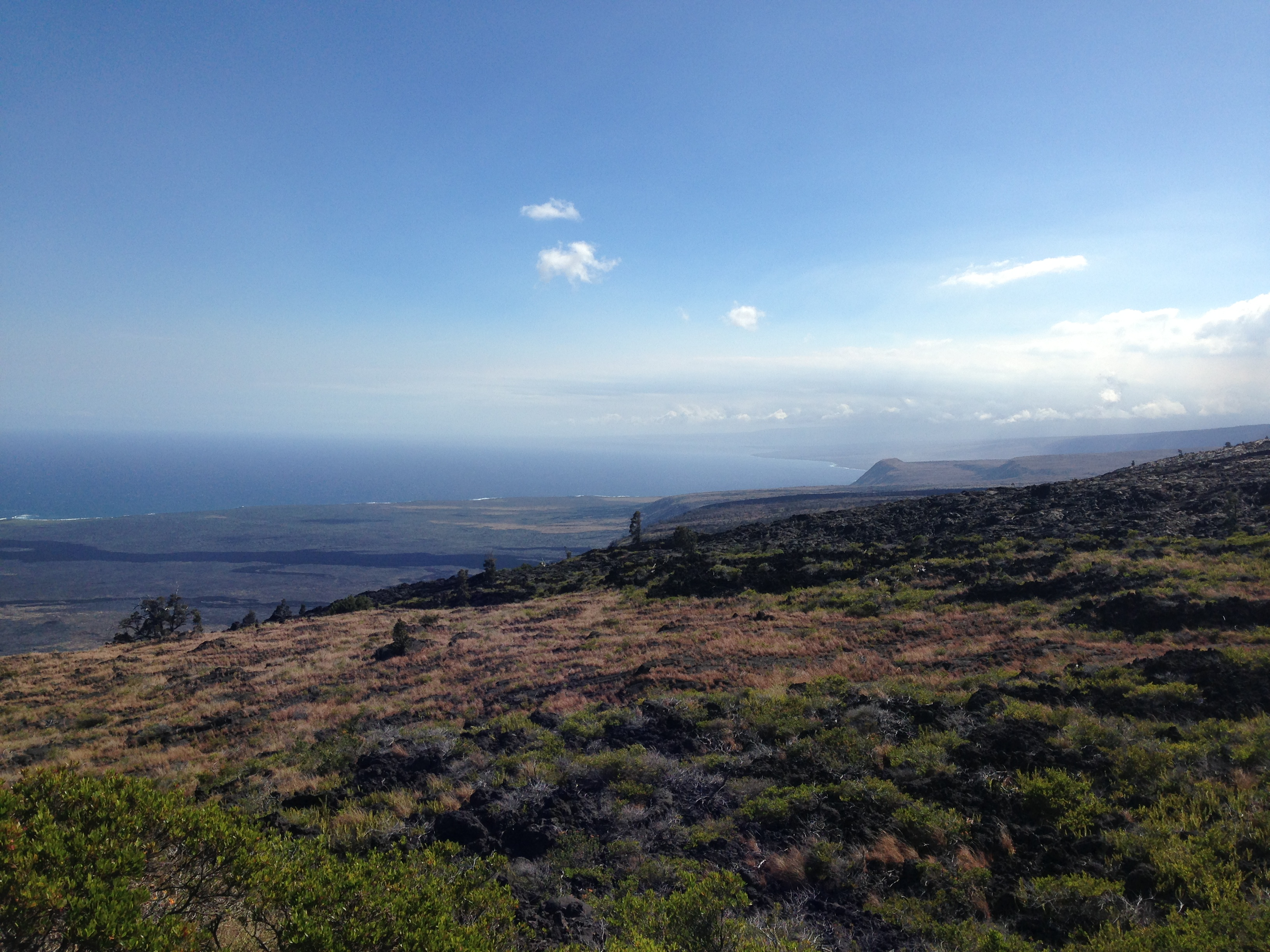
The view of the Kaʻū coastline from HVNP. Looking southwest towards Na'alehu

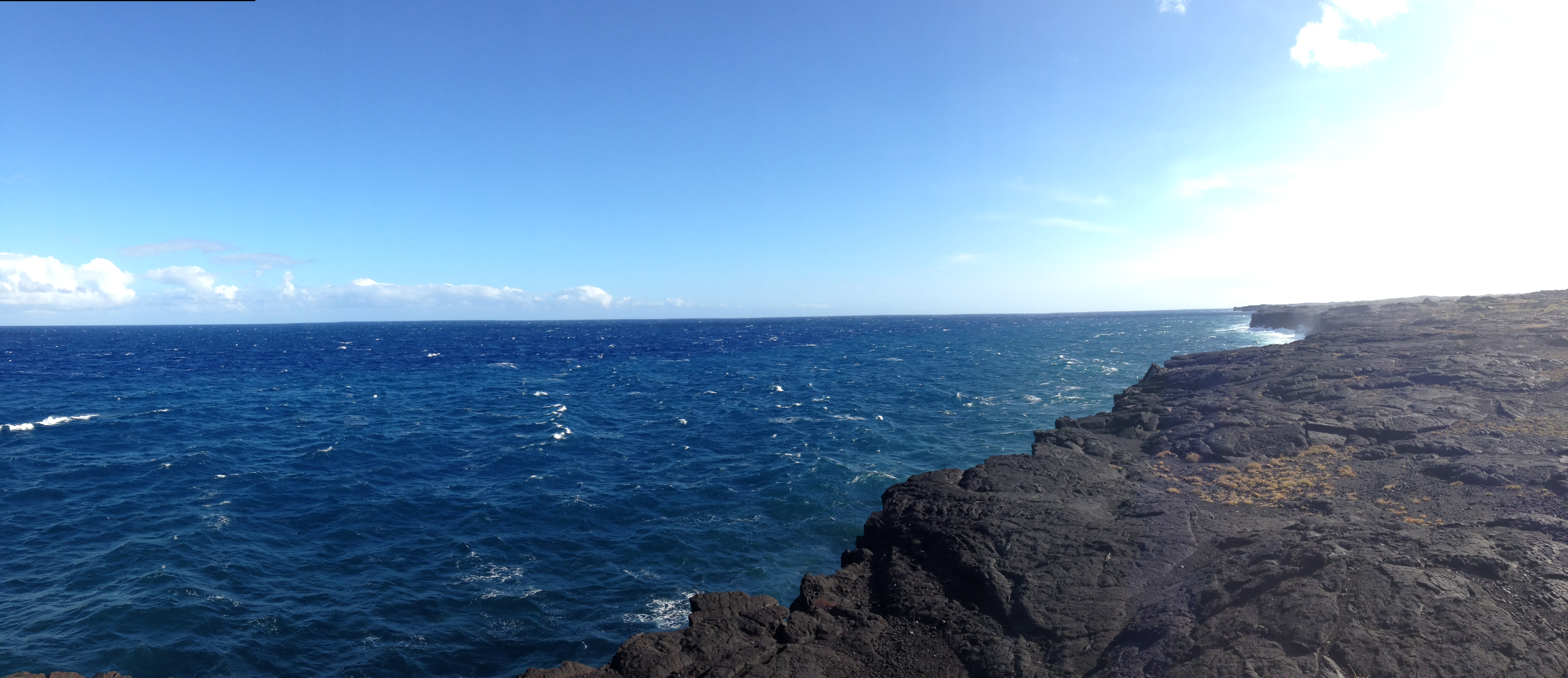
Much of the Kaʻū coastline is made up of volcanic Pali. Looking southwest from HVNP

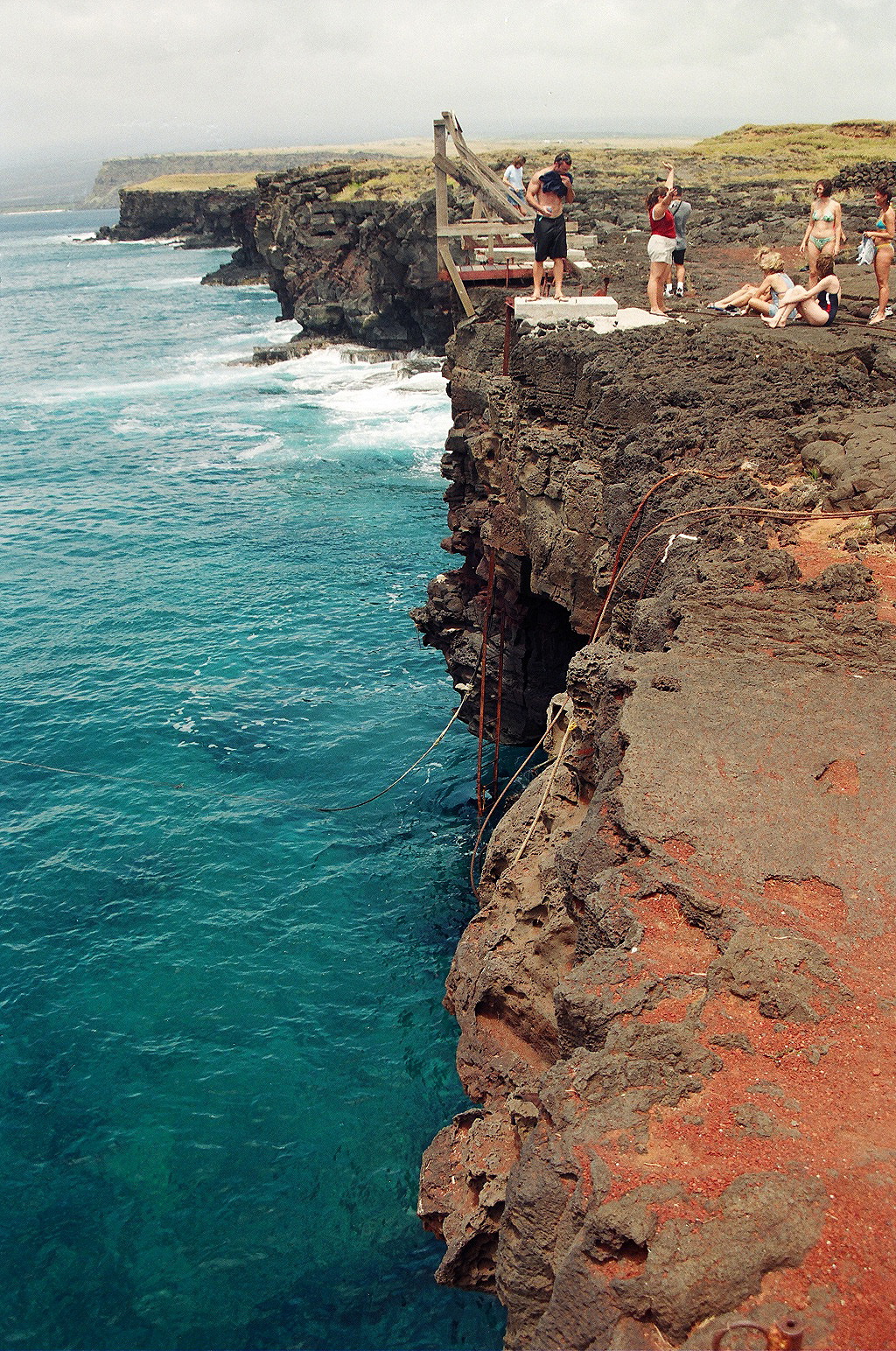
The Kaʻū district's Ka Lae Point, the southernmost point of any of the US States
