= Kaunakakai, Hawaii =

- Census-designated place
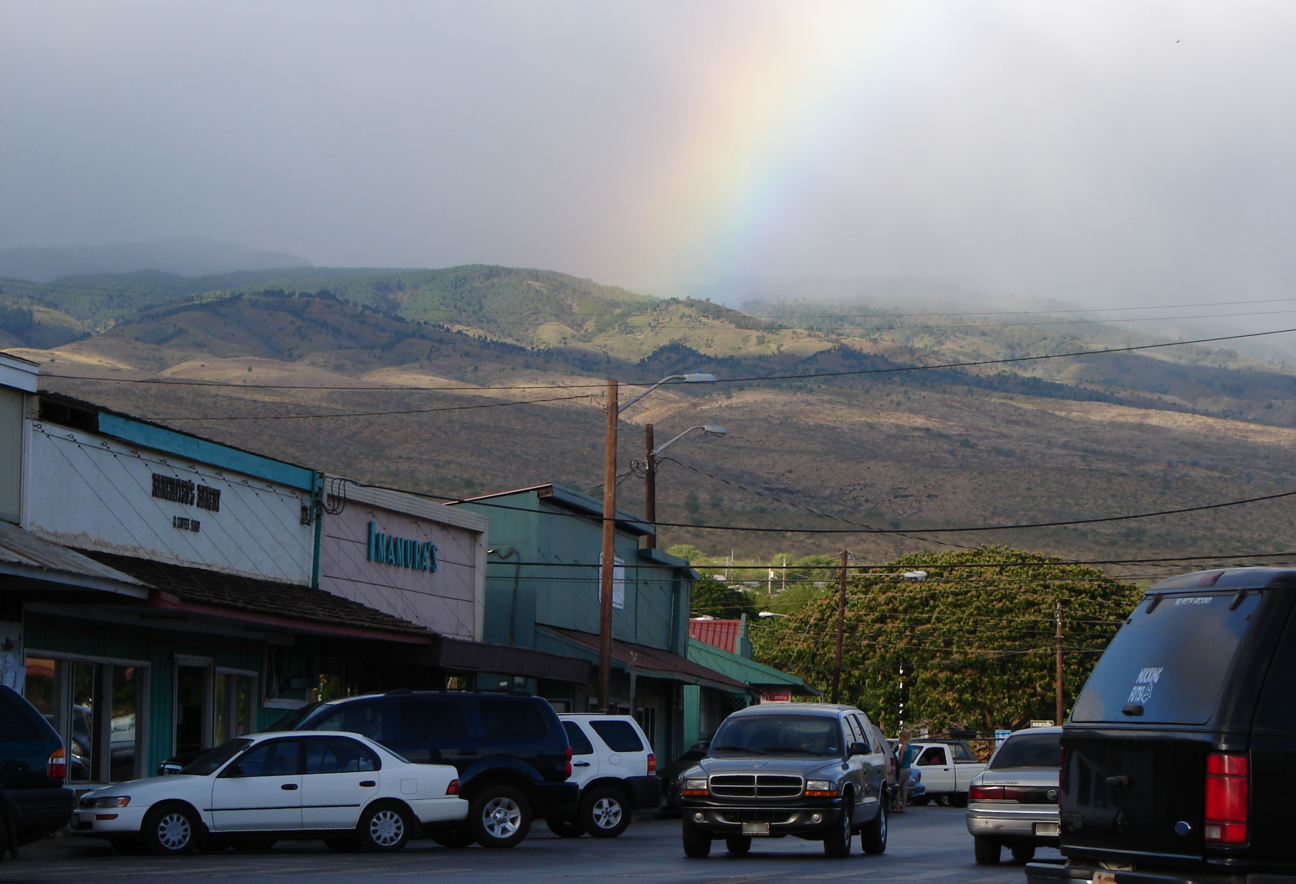
- Downtown Kaunakakai, July 2006

- Location in Maui County and the state of Hawaii

- Location in Hawaii
- Coordinates: 21°5′20″N 157°0′45″W
- Country: United States
- State: Hawaii
- County: Maui

Area
  - Total: 16.45 sq mi (42.60 km^{2})
  - Land: 12.83 sq mi (33.22 km^{2})
  - Water: 3.62 sq mi (9.37 km^{2})
- Elevation: 20 ft (6 m)

Population (2020)
  - Total: 3,419
  - Density: 266.5/sq mi (102.91/km^{2})
- Time zone: UTC-10 (Hawaii-Aleutian)
- ZIP code: 96748
- Area code: 808
- FIPS code: 15-31100
- GNIS feature ID: 0360717

Kaunakakai (Hawaiian pronunciation: [kɐwnəkəˈkɐj]) is a census-designated place (CDP) in Maui County, Hawaiʻi, United States. It is the largest town on the island of Molokaʻi. The population was 3,419 at the 2020 census. It has the largest port on the island and the longest pier in Hawaii. The town was made famous in the 1930s by the song "The Cockeyed Mayor of Kaunakakai", beginning an ongoing tradition of designating an honorary mayor for the town.

== History ==
In the mid-1800s, King Kamehameha V sometimes spent his summers on Moloka'i at a home in Kaunakakai. The main street of Kaunakakai, Ala Malama Avenue, was named after the king's summer home.

Around mid-1935, the song was written for the celebration of the first honorary mayor, 'The Cockeyed Mayor of Kaunakakai', during the vacation visit by Academy Award-winning Best Actor in 1929, Warner Baxter. The "election" was a seven-day celebration by the locals and Baxter's vacation party.

== Geography ==
Kaunakakai is located at 21°5′20″N 157°0′45″W (21.088968, -157.012542).

According to the United States Census Bureau, the CDP has a total area of 16.4 square miles (42.6 km^{2}), of which 12.8 square miles (33.2 km^{2}) is land and 3.6 square miles (9.4 km^{2}), or 22.00%, is water.

== Climate ==
Kaunakakai has a tropical savanna climate (Köppen: As). The record high is 94 °F (34 °C), set on September 16, 2019, whilst the record low is 46 °F (8 °C), set on March 4, 1987. Kaunakakai falls into the USDA Plant Hardiness Zone 12a.

Climate data for Kaunakakai, Hawaii (Molokai Airport), 1991–2020 normals, extremes 1949–present
| Month | Jan | Feb | Mar | Apr | May | Jun | Jul | Aug | Sep | Oct | Nov | Dec | Year |
|---|---|---|---|---|---|---|---|---|---|---|---|---|---|
| Record high °F (°C) | 88 (31) | 89 (32) | 87 (31) | 92 (33) | 90 (32) | 90 (32) | 92 (33) | 93 (34) | 94 (34) | 93 (34) | 91 (33) | 91 (33) | 94 (34) |
| Mean maximum °F (°C) | 82.3 (27.9) | 82.8 (28.2) | 83.4 (28.6) | 84.0 (28.9) | 85.7 (29.8) | 86.8 (30.4) | 88.7 (31.5) | 89.0 (31.7) | 89.0 (31.7) | 88.2 (31.2) | 86.2 (30.1) | 84.1 (28.9) | 89.9 (32.2) |
| Mean daily maximum °F (°C) | 78.8 (26.0) | 78.8 (26.0) | 79.2 (26.2) | 81.0 (27.2) | 82.8 (28.2) | 84.7 (29.3) | 85.5 (29.7) | 86.5 (30.3) | 86.7 (30.4) | 85.5 (29.7) | 82.8 (28.2) | 80.2 (26.8) | 82.7 (28.2) |
| Daily mean °F (°C) | 71.6 (22.0) | 71.7 (22.1) | 72.5 (22.5) | 74.0 (23.3) | 75.7 (24.3) | 78.1 (25.6) | 79.1 (26.2) | 80.0 (26.7) | 79.7 (26.5) | 78.5 (25.8) | 76.2 (24.6) | 73.5 (23.1) | 75.9 (24.4) |
| Mean daily minimum °F (°C) | 64.3 (17.9) | 64.6 (18.1) | 65.8 (18.8) | 67.1 (19.5) | 68.6 (20.3) | 71.5 (21.9) | 72.7 (22.6) | 73.4 (23.0) | 72.8 (22.7) | 71.4 (21.9) | 69.6 (20.9) | 66.9 (19.4) | 69.1 (20.6) |
| Mean minimum °F (°C) | 55.4 (13.0) | 55.7 (13.2) | 57.5 (14.2) | 60.0 (15.6) | 61.0 (16.1) | 65.0 (18.3) | 66.8 (19.3) | 67.2 (19.6) | 65.8 (18.8) | 64.3 (17.9) | 61.3 (16.3) | 58.1 (14.5) | 53.9 (12.2) |
| Record low °F (°C) | 52 (11) | 48 (9) | 46 (8) | 48 (9) | 52 (11) | 55 (13) | 58 (14) | 56 (13) | 59 (15) | 58 (14) | 57 (14) | 50 (10) | 46 (8) |
| Average rainfall inches (mm) | 3.56 (90) | 2.31 (59) | 3.02 (77) | 1.54 (39) | 1.15 (29) | 0.61 (15) | 0.62 (16) | 0.84 (21) | 0.99 (25) | 1.54 (39) | 2.67 (68) | 2.87 (73) | 21.72 (552) |
| Average rainy days (≥ 0.01 in) | 10.8 | 9.7 | 11.0 | 9.1 | 6.3 | 5.8 | 8.2 | 6.8 | 7.9 | 8.0 | 10.9 | 11.0 | 105.5 |
Source: NOAA

== Demographics ==
Historical population
| Census | Pop. | Note | %± |
|---|---|---|---|
| 2010 | 3,425 | | — |
| 2020 | 3,419 | | −0.2% |
U.S. Decennial Census

=== 2020 census ===
As of the 2020 census, Kaunakakai had a population of 3,419. The median age was 45.2 years. 23.6% of residents were under the age of 18 and 27.4% of residents were 65 years of age or older. For every 100 females there were 92.7 males, and for every 100 females age 18 and over there were 88.6 males age 18 and over.

0.0% of residents lived in urban areas, while 100.0% lived in rural areas.

There were 1,240 households in Kaunakakai, of which 33.1% had children under the age of 18 living in them. Of all households, 43.6% were married-couple households, 17.4% were households with a male householder and no spouse or partner present, and 31.3% were households with a female householder and no spouse or partner present. About 25.5% of all households were made up of individuals and 16.6% had someone living alone who was 65 years of age or older.

There were 1,490 housing units, of which 16.8% were vacant. The homeowner vacancy rate was 0.7% and the rental vacancy rate was 10.0%.

Racial composition as of the 2020 census
| Race | Number | Percent |
|---|---|---|
| White | 475 | 13.9% |
| Black or African American | 13 | 0.4% |
| American Indian and Alaska Native | 10 | 0.3% |
| Asian | 656 | 19.2% |
| Native Hawaiian and Other Pacific Islander | 1,045 | 30.6% |
| Some other race | 24 | 0.7% |
| Two or more races | 1,196 | 35.0% |
| Hispanic or Latino (of any race) | 216 | 6.3% |

=== 2010 census ===
As of the census of 2010, there were 3,425 people, 1,254 households, and 850 families residing in the CDP. The population density was 1,342.7 inhabitants per square mile (518.4/km^{2}). There were 1,533 housing units at an average density of 473.8 per square mile (182.9/km^{2}). The racial makeup of the CDP was 15.4% White, 0.5% Black, 0.3% Native American, 22.2% Asian (of whom 15.5% were Filipino), 22.4% Native Hawaiian, 0.3% from other races, and 37.4% from two or more races. Hispanic or Latino of any race were 5.9% of the population.

There were 1,254 households, out of which 24.6% had children under the age of 18 living with them, 46.3% were married couples living together, 15.7% had a female householder with no husband present, and 33.2% were non-families. 22.5% of all households were made up of individuals, and 27% of households had someone living alone who was 65 years of age or older. The average household size was 2.73, and the average family size was 3.32.

=== 2000 census ===
As of the census of 2000, in the CDP, the population was spread out, with 31.8% under the age of 18, 8.3% from 18 to 24, 22.6% from 25 to 44, 21.6% from 45 to 64, and 15.2% who were 65 years of age or older. The median age was 36 years. For every 100 females, there were 91.8 males. For every 100 females age 18 and over, there were 88.3 males.

The median income for a household in the CDP was $34,492, and the median income for a family was $39,348. Males had a median income of $30,543 versus $22,337 for females. The per capita income for the CDP was $14,201. About 15.5% of families and 20.6% of the population were below the poverty line, including 27.4% of those under age 18 and 11.8% of those age 65 or over.

== Education ==
There is one statewide school district in Hawaii: Hawaii State Department of Education.

The Hawaii State Public Library System operates the Molokai Public Library in Kaunakakai.
