= Puʻunēnē, Hawaii =

Unincorporated community in Hawaii

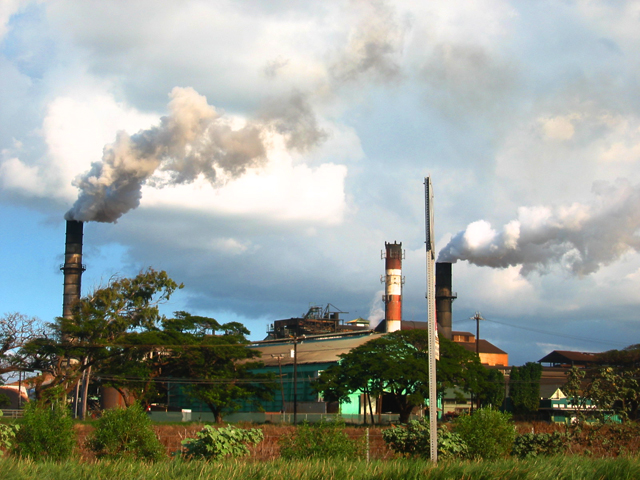
Puʻunene sugar mill, built in 1901

Puʻunēnē is an unincorporated community in the central part of Maui, Hawaii, United States (near Kahului), with a population of approximately 8. Although the land is fairly level, the Hawaiian name for the area means "goose hill", in reference to the endemic nēnē (or Hawaiian goose, the state bird).

== History ==
Puʻunēnē's primary industry was growing, harvesting and processing sugarcane for over a century, anchored by the HC&S sugar mill built in 1901, but production ceased in 2016. The multiple plantation camps making up the community were slowly dismantled during the late twentieth century as the plantation system declined. In 2019, a field of potatoes was planted by Mahi Pono where sugar cane used to be grown. This 40-acre (16 ha) initial planting was the beginning of using these fallow lands to increase local food production.

Notable people from Puʻunēnē include Mary Louise Kekuewa.

== Sites ==
The Alexander & Baldwin Sugar Museum is housed in the former residence of the superintendent of Puʻunene Sugar Mill, which the Hawaiian Commercial & Sugar Company (a division of Alexander & Baldwin) operated across the street since 1901. Its mission is "to preserve and present the history and heritage of Hawaii's sugar industry, and the multi-ethnic plantation life which it engendered." Also located in Puʻunēnē is the Puʻunēnē School, which is listed on the National Register of Historic Places.

About three miles (4.8 km) to the south of Puʻunēnē is the site of a former Naval Air Station (1940–1947),20°48′59″N 156°27′38″W. This would later be known as Pu’unēnē Airport, and was the site for the second Maui Airport, after Maalaea, and part of the struggle to achieve an adequate landing strip of the Island of Maui for Hawaiian Airlines to use. An old runway is now used as a drag strip for Maui Raceway Park.

Puʻunēnē's ZIP code is 96784. The mill is located at 20°52′3″N 156°27′16″W, just east of Mokulele Highway, Hawaii Route 311.

== Gallery ==
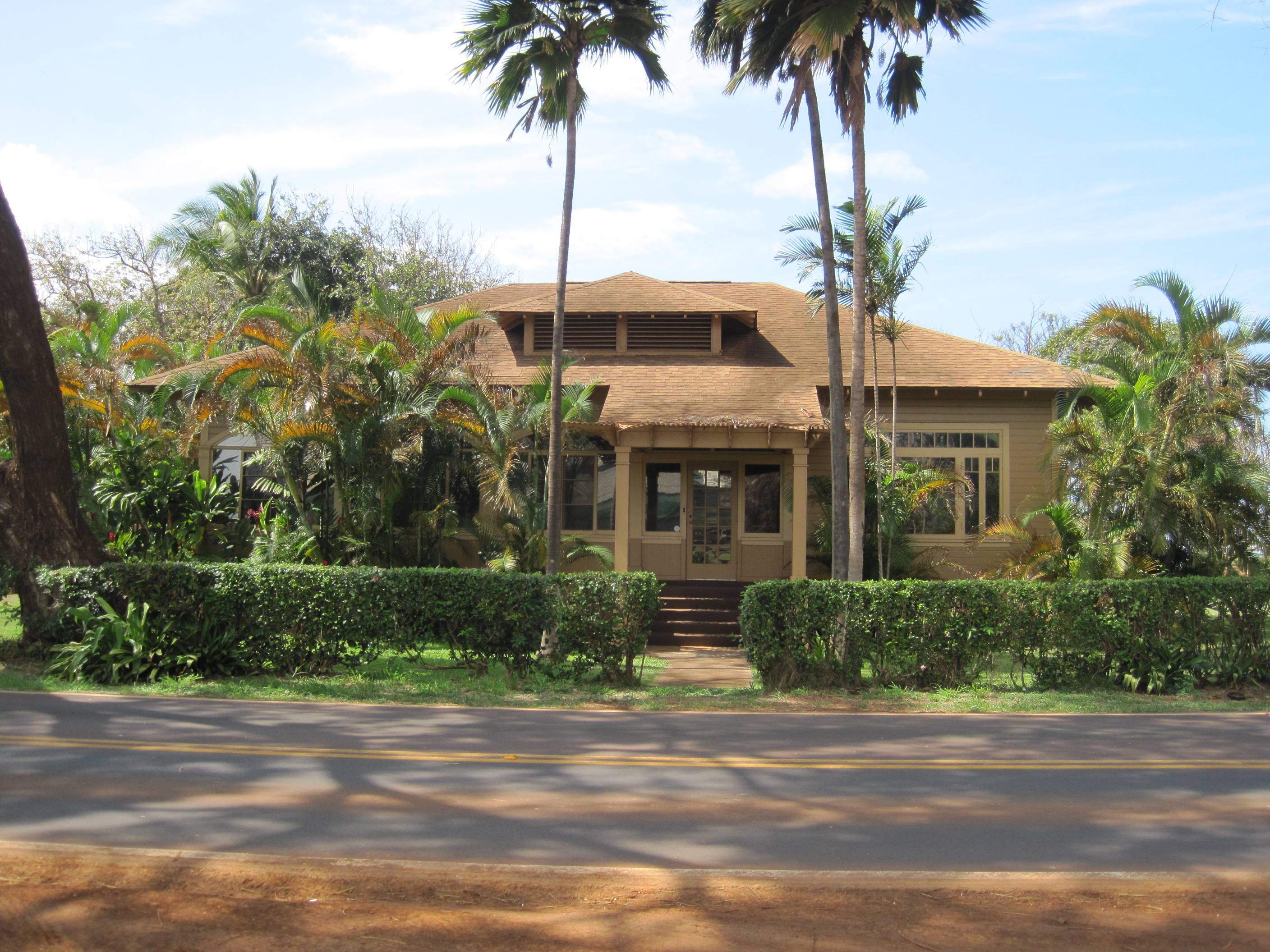
Alexander & Baldwin Sugar Museum, former Puʻunene Mill manager's house

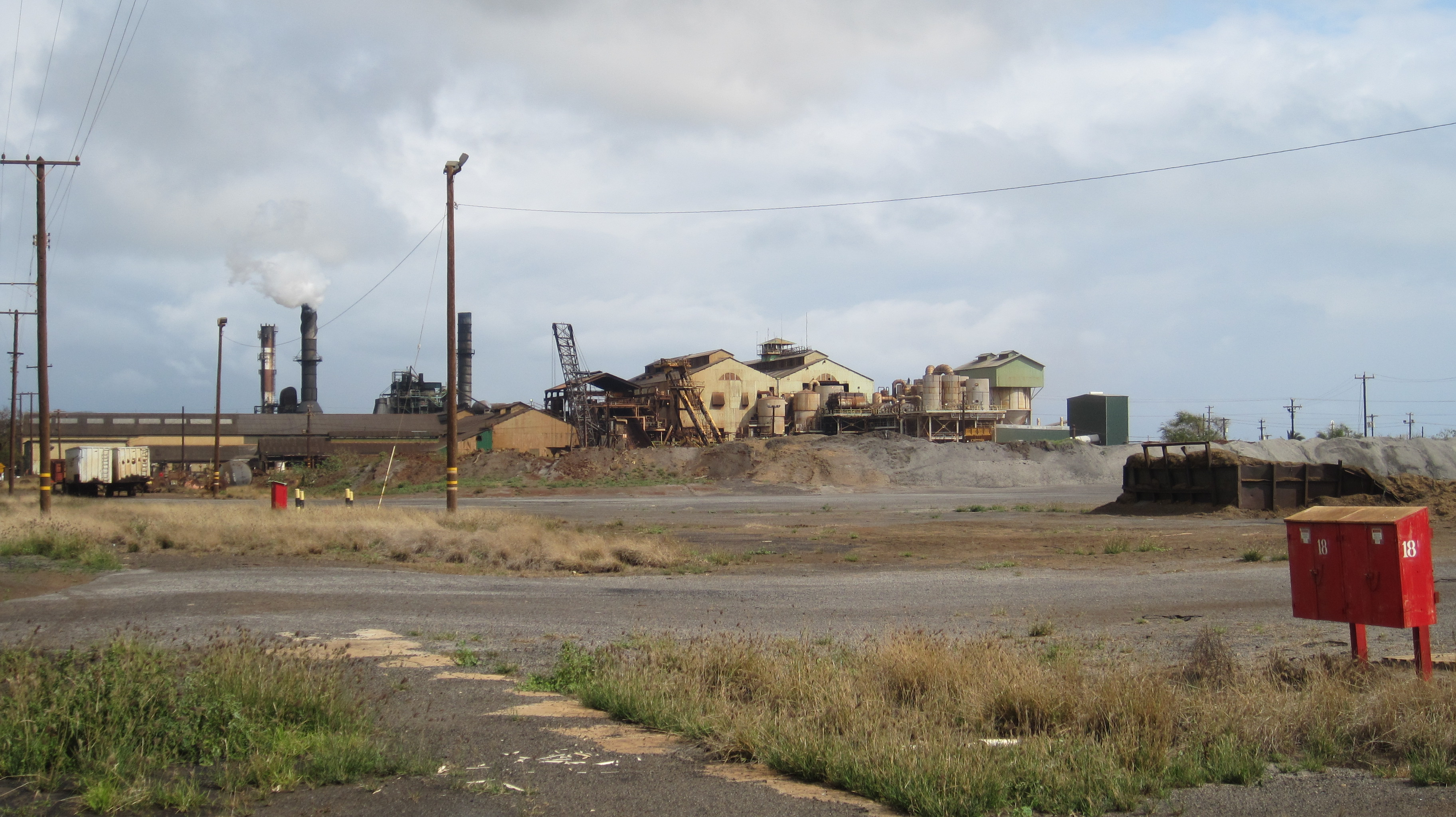
Hawaiian Commercial & Sugar Company Mill, view from Old Puʻunene Road coming from former Puʻunene Camp

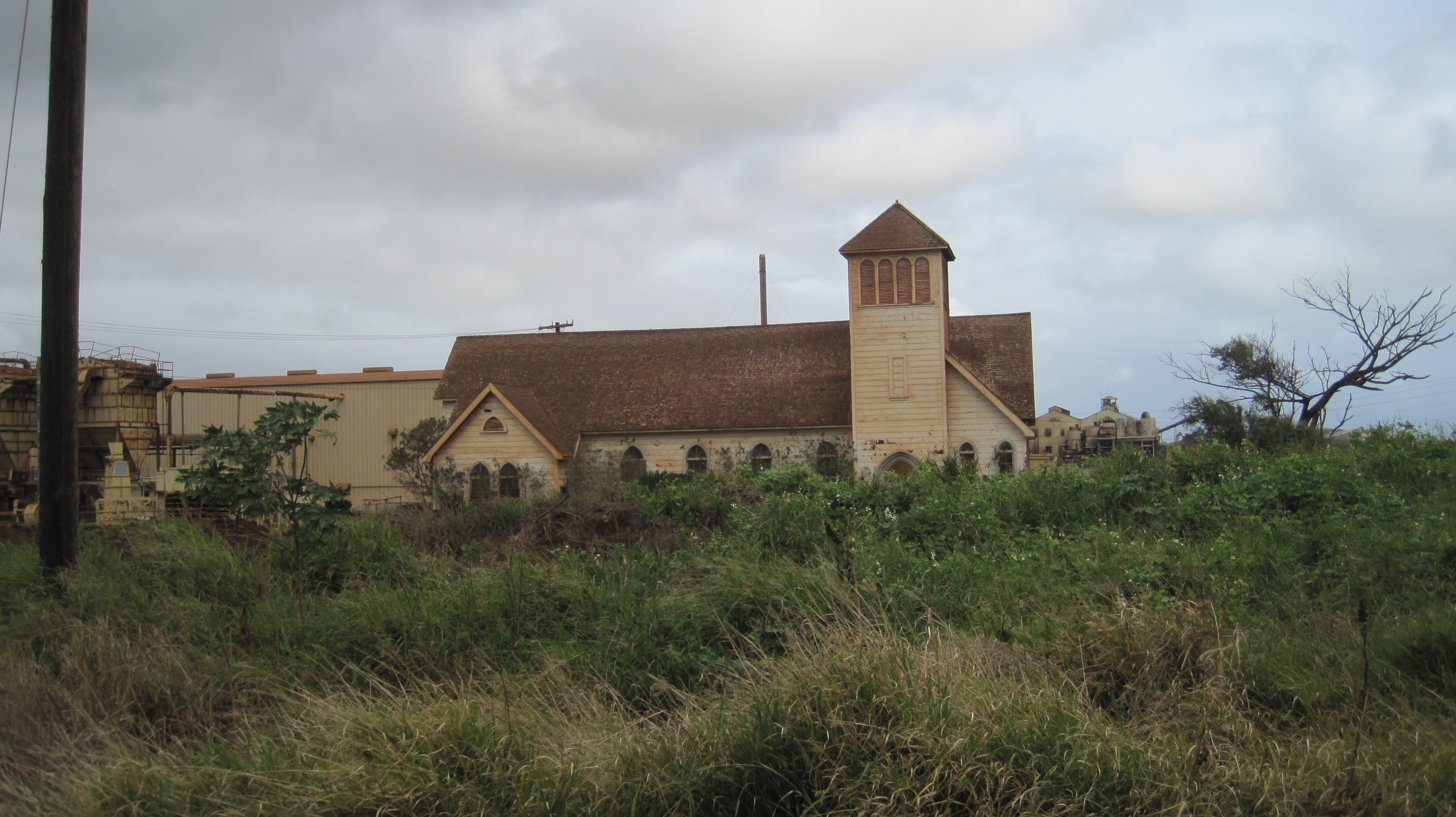
Puʻunene Congregational Church (1910), the first Japanese Christian church in Maui, now to be demolished or moved

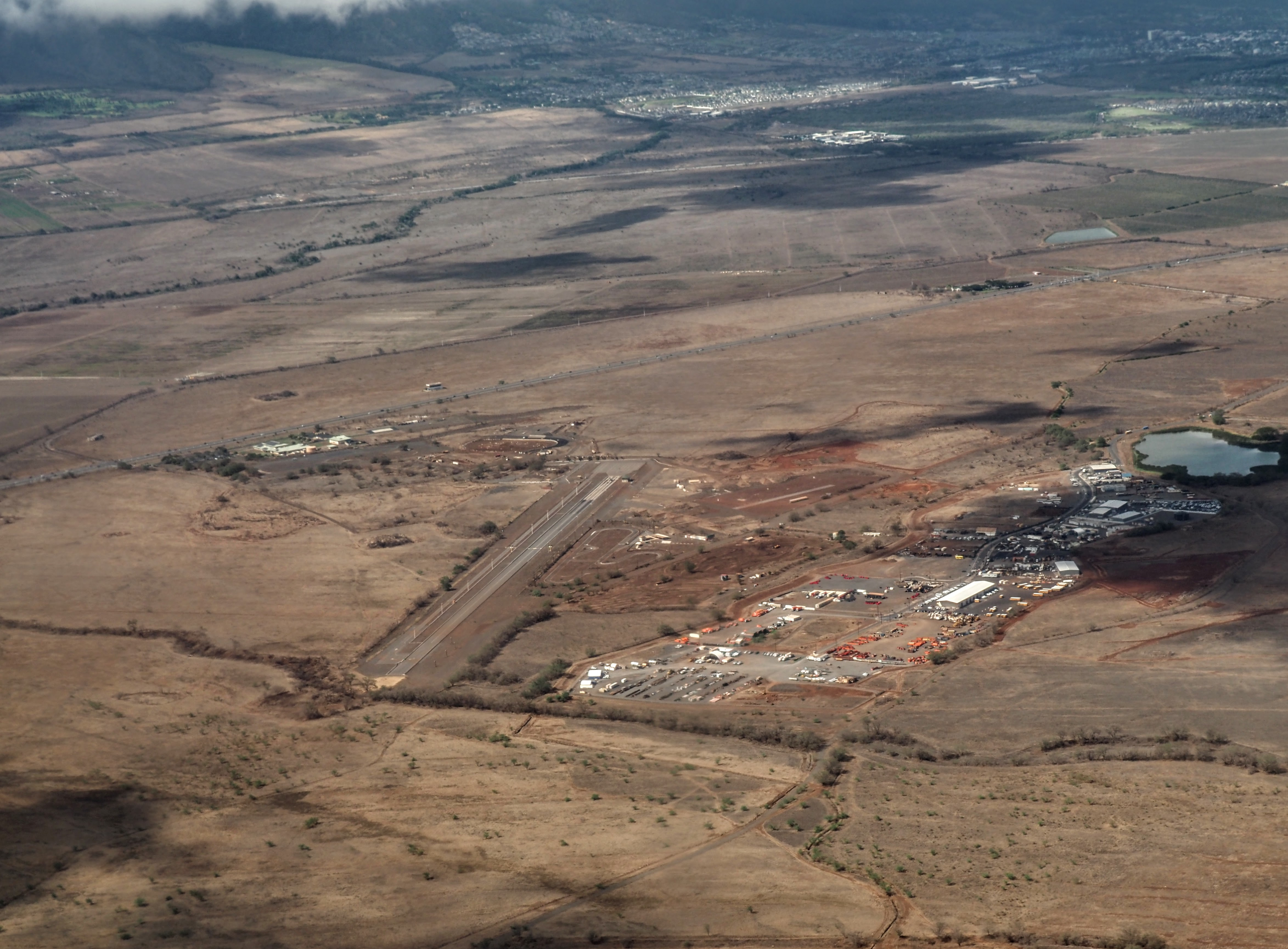
Aerial view, from the south, of Puʻunēnē with the old airstrip that is now the dragstrip at Maui Raceway Park
