= Rosenberg (surname) =

- Language: German

Origin
- Meaning: mountain of roses

Rosenberg is a family name and toponym of German origin. Its principal meaning is "mountain of roses", from Rose + Berg. However, as a toponym, in some locations it may have originally meant "red mountain" or simply "red hill", from rot + Berg. The terminal consonant of the /rot/-/roθ/-/roð/-/ros/ syllable has varied across regions and centuries; there are many variations of the name, including Rozenberg, Rotenberg, Rottenberg, Rothenberg and Rodenberg. For Rozenberg, see end of list. It is also a common name among Ashkenazi Jews.

== Notable people ==
=== A–E ===
- Aaron "Rosy" Rosenberg (1912–1979), American college football player, and film and television producer
- Alan Rosenberg (born 1950), American actor
- Aleksandr Rosenberg (1877–1935), Russian architect
- Alexander Rosenberg (born 1946), American philosopher of science
- Alfred Rosenberg (1893–1946), German theorist and Nazi official, executed for war crimes
- Alina Rosenberg (born 1992), German Paralympic equestrian
- Allen Rosenberg (rowing) (1931–2013), American rowing coxswain and rowing coach
- Andrei Rosenberg (1739–1813), Russian military officer
- Ari Rosenberg (born 1964), Israeli basketball player
- Ariel Marcus Rosenberg (born 1978), American singer-songwriter and musician
- Arthur Rosenberg (1889–1943), German Marxist historian and writer
- Tony Randall (born Aryeh Leonard Rosenberg, 1920–2004), American actor
- Barnett Rosenberg (1926–2009), American chemist who discovered anti-tumor properties of cisplatin
- Caroline Rosenberg (1810–1902), Danish botanist
- Catherine Rosenberg, electrical engineer
- Chris Rosenberg (1950–1979), American mobster
- Clarke Rosenberg (born 1993), American-Israeli basketball player
- Daniel Rosenberg, Canadian journalist and record producer
- Debbie Rosenberg (born 1969), American bridge player
- Elias Abraham Rosenberg (c.1810–1887), early visitor to Hawaii
- Elmer Rosenberg (1885–1951), American politician
- Emil Rosenberg (1842–1925), Baltic German chemist
- Erika Rosenberg (born 1951), Argentine author
- Evelyn Rosenberg, American sculptor

=== F–M ===
- Franz Seraph of Orsini-Rosenberg (1761–1832), Austrian general
- Fishel Rosenberg, birth name of Fred Rose (politician) (1907–1983), Canadian politician and trade unionist convicted of spying for the Soviet Union
- Göran Rosenberg (born 1948), Swedish journalist and author
- Hans Rosenberg (1904–1988), German historian
- Hans von Rosenberg (1874–1934), German diplomat and politician, foreign minister of Germany
- Hans Oswald Rosenberg (1879–1940), German astronomer
- Harold Rosenberg (1906–1978), American art critic
- Harold Max Rosenberg (1922–1993), British physicist
- Hermann von Rosenberg (1817–1888), German naturalist
- Hilding Rosenberg (1892–1985), Swedish composer
- Isaac Rosenberg (1890–1918), English poet and artist
- Janet Rosenberg, birth name of Janet Jagan (1920–2009), President of Guyana
- Jerry Rosenberg (1937–2009), American jailhouse lawyer
- Joel Rosenberg (disambiguation), several people
- Jonathan Rosenberg (mathematician) (born 1951), American mathematician
- Jonathan Rosenberg (artist) (born 1973), American webcomic artist
- Julius and Ethel Rosenberg (1918–1953 and 1915–1953), Americans who spied for the Soviet Union, executed for espionage
- Justus Rosenberg (1921–2021), Polish-born American educator and member of the Resistance during World War II
- Kenny Rosenberg (born 1995), American baseball pitcher
- Kirsten Rosenberg, American singer for The Iron Maidens
- Lars Rosenberg (born 1971), Swedish heavy metal musician
- Leo Rosenberg (1879–1963), German jurist
- Lina Olsson Rosenberg (born 1971), Swedish handball player
- Louis Conrad Rosenberg (1890–1983), American etcher
- Mark Rosenberg (disambiguation), several people
- Margarete Rosenberg (1910–1985), German Holocaust survivor
- Margarete Rosenberg (1894–1993), German poet better known as Henriette Hardenberg
- Marianne Rosenberg (born 1955), German singersongwriter
- Marina Rosenberg (born 1976), Argentine-born Israeli diplomat
- Markus Rosenberg (born 1982), Swedish footballer
- Marlene Rosenberg, American plasma physicist
- Marshall Rosenberg (1934–2015), American psychologist
- Martin Rosenberg. (1890–1942), Polish musician and Holocaust victim
- Matthew Rosenberg (born 1974), American journalist
- Mauritz Rosenberg (1879–1941), Finnish politician
- Michael Rosenberg (born 1954), American bridge player
- Michael David Rosenberg (born 1984), British pop singer better known as Passenger
- Milton J. Rosenberg, American social psychologist and radio host
- Mirta Rosenberg (1951–2019), Argentine poet and translator

=== N–Z ===
- Nikolay Yakovlevich Rosenberg (1807–1857), Russian naval officer
- Nina Chermak Rosenberg, American costume designer
- Noah Rosenberg, American geneticist
- Otto Rosenberg, Russian sinologist
- Pablo Rosenberg, Argentine singer
- Paul Rosenberg (disambiguation), several people
- Peter Rosenberg, American radio DJ and television show host
- Robert Rosenberg (disambiguation), several people
- Rodrigo Rosenberg Marzano, Guatemalan lawyer
- Rose Rosenberg (1892–1966), British private secretary
- Samuel Rosenberg (writer) (1912–1996), American writer and photographer
- Samuel I. Rosenberg (born 1950), American politician from Maryland
- Samuel Rosenberg (artist) (1896–1972), American artist and professor
- Sándor Rosenberg (1844–1909), Hungarian rabbi
- Scott Rosenberg, American screenwriter
- Scott Rosenberg (journalist), American journalist
- Scott Mitchell Rosenberg, American film producer
- Stan Rosenberg (born 1949), American politician
- Steve Rosenberg (born 1968), British journalist (BBC's Russia editor)
- Steven Rosenberg, American surgeon and cancer immunotherapy pioneer
- Stochelo Rosenberg, Dutch Sinti-Gypsy jazz guitarist
- Stuart Rosenberg, American film director
- Susanne Rosenberg (born 1957), Swedish folk music singer and vocal coach
- Tiina Rosenberg (born 1958), Swedish professor
- Tiit Rosenberg, Estonian historian
- Vanna Rosenberg (born 1973), Swedish singer and actress
- Vjekoslav Rosenberg-Ružić, Croatian composer, conductor and music educator
- William Rosenberg (1916–2002), American founder of Dunkin' Donuts
- William of Rosenberg (1535–1592), Bohemian nobleman
- William Frederick Henry Rosenberg (1868–1957), English zoologist
- Yale Rosenberg (1939–2002), American legal scholar
- Yehudah Yudel Rosenberg (1860–1935), rabbi, author, and communal leader
- Zoe Rosenberg, American animal rights activist and animal sanctuary founder

=== Rozenberg ===
- David I. Rozenberg (1879–1950), Lithuanian/Soviet economist
- Grzegorz Rozenberg (born 1942), Polish-born mathematician and computer scientist
- Joshua Rozenberg (born 1950), British journalist specializing in legal matters
- Dadara (born 1969), Polish-Dutch artist, birth name Daniel Rozenberg

== Fictional characters ==
- Willow Rosenberg, in American television series Buffy the Vampire Slayer
- Ken Rosenberg, in the Grand Theft Auto video games
- Dr. Rosenberg, in the video game expansions Half-Life: Blue Shift and Half-Life: Decay
- Ocean O'Connell Rosenberg, in the musical Ride the Cyclone

== Other ==
- Rosenberg family, Bohemian Rosenberg dynasty (Czech: Rožmberk), Lords of Krumlov and Rožmberk
- Orsini-Rosenberg, Austrian princely family

== See also ==
- Rodenberg (disambiguation)
- Rosenegg (disambiguation)
- Rotenberg
- Rottenberg
- Rotenburg (disambiguation)
- Rothenberg (surname)
- Rottenburg (disambiguation)
