= David Rosenberg =

David Rosenberg may refer to:

- David Rosenberg (curator), French art curator and author
- David Rosenberg (poet), American poet, biblical translator, editor, and educator
- David Alan Rosenberg, military historian

== See also ==
- David I. Rozenberg, Soviet economist
