= Robert Rosenberg =

Robert Rosenberg may refer to:

- Robert Rosenberg (writer) (1951–2006), writer, journalist, poet and Internet pioneer
- Robert M. Rosenberg (born 1938), American businessman, former chief executive officer of Dunkin' Donuts
- Robert A. Rosenberg (born 1934), United States Air Force general
