= Rutenberg =

Rutenberg is a municipality in the northeastern German state Brandenburg. It may also refer to:

- asteroid 20478 Rutenberg
- Rutenber Motor Company, which supplied engines and components to Geronimo Motor Company.
- Jim Rutenberg
- Mike Rutenberg (born 1981), American football coach
- Pinchas Rutenberg

== See also ==
- Rothenberg (disambiguation)
