= Rodenburg =

Rodenburg (pronounced [ˈroːdə(m)bʏr(ə)x]) is a Dutch toponymic surname. Among variant spellings are Rodenburgh, Roodenburch, Roodenburg, and Roodenburgh, all pronounced the same. The name may indicate an origin in Rodenburgh, the medieval name of the city Aardenburg in Zeeland. Meaning "red castle" or "red fortress", a number of castles and fortresses in the Low Countries carried that name as well. People with this surname include:

- Bartholomeus Roodenburch (1866–1939), Dutch backstroke swimmer
- Brecht Rodenburg (born 1967), Dutch volleyball player
- Carl Rodenburg (1894–1992), German World War II general at the Battle of Stalingrad
- Henry Rodenburg (c. 1851 – 1899), German-born American soldier who fought Native Americans
- John Rodenburg (born 1960), British physicist
- Jordanus Roodenburgh (1886–1972), Dutch urban-architect and director of AFC Ajax
- Patsy Rodenburg (born 1953), British voice coach, author, and theatre director
- Phuttharaksa Neegree Rodenburg (born 1974), Thai rower
- Theodore Rodenburgh (1574–1644), Dutch poet, playwright, diplomat and merchant

== See also ==
- Rodenberg (disambiguation)
