= Rothenberg (disambiguation) =

Rothenberg is a community in the Odenwaldkreis district in Hesse, Germany.

Rothenberg may also refer to:

- 20512 Rothenberg, an asteroid
- Rothenberg Fortress, a fortress in the Nürnberger Land district in Bavaria, Germany
- Rothenberg propriety, a concept in music theory
- Rothenberg Ventures, a Venture Capital firm

== People with the surname ==
- Adam Rothenberg (born 1975), American actor
- Alan Rothenberg (born 1939), American soccer owner and official
- Albert Rothenberg (born 1930), American psychiatrist
- Betty Rothenberg, American television and theater director
- Beno Rothenberg, Israeli photographer and archaeologist
- Ellen Rothenberg (writer) (born 1949), American artist and writer
- Gunther E. Rothenberg (1923–2004), military historian
- Hans Rothenberg (born 1961), Swedish politician
- James Rothenberg (1946–2015), American businessman
- Jerome Rothenberg (born 1931), American poet
- Karly Rothenberg (born 1962), American actor
- Laura Rothenberg (1981–2003), American author
- Michael Rothenberg (1951–2022), American poet, songwriter, editor, and environmentalist
- Ned Rothenberg (born 1956), American musician and composer
- Stanley Rothenberg (1930–2006), American copyright lawyer
- Stuart Rothenberg (born 1948), American political pollster
- Susan Rothenberg (1945–2020), American painter

== See also ==
- Rosenberg (surname)
- Rotenberg (disambiguation)
- Rotenburg (disambiguation)
- Rothenburg (disambiguation)
- Rottenburg (disambiguation)
