= Alex Rosenberg =

Alex Rosenberg may refer to:

- Alexander Rosenberg (born 1946), American philosopher and novelist
- Alex F. T. W. Rosenberg (1926–2007), German-American mathematician
- Alexander L. Rosenberg (1946–2012), Russian-American mathematician
- Alex Rosenberg (basketball) (born 1991), American Israeli basketball player

== See also ==
- Aleksandr Rosenberg (1877–1935), Russian architect and author
- Aleksandr Rozenberg (b. 1967), Transnistrian politician
