= Ellen Rothenberg =

Ellen Rothenberg may refer to:

- Ellen Rothenberg (writer), American visual artist and writer
- Ellen Rothenberg (scientist), American biologist
