= Temple Emanu-El (Honolulu) =

Synagogue in Honolulu, Hawaii

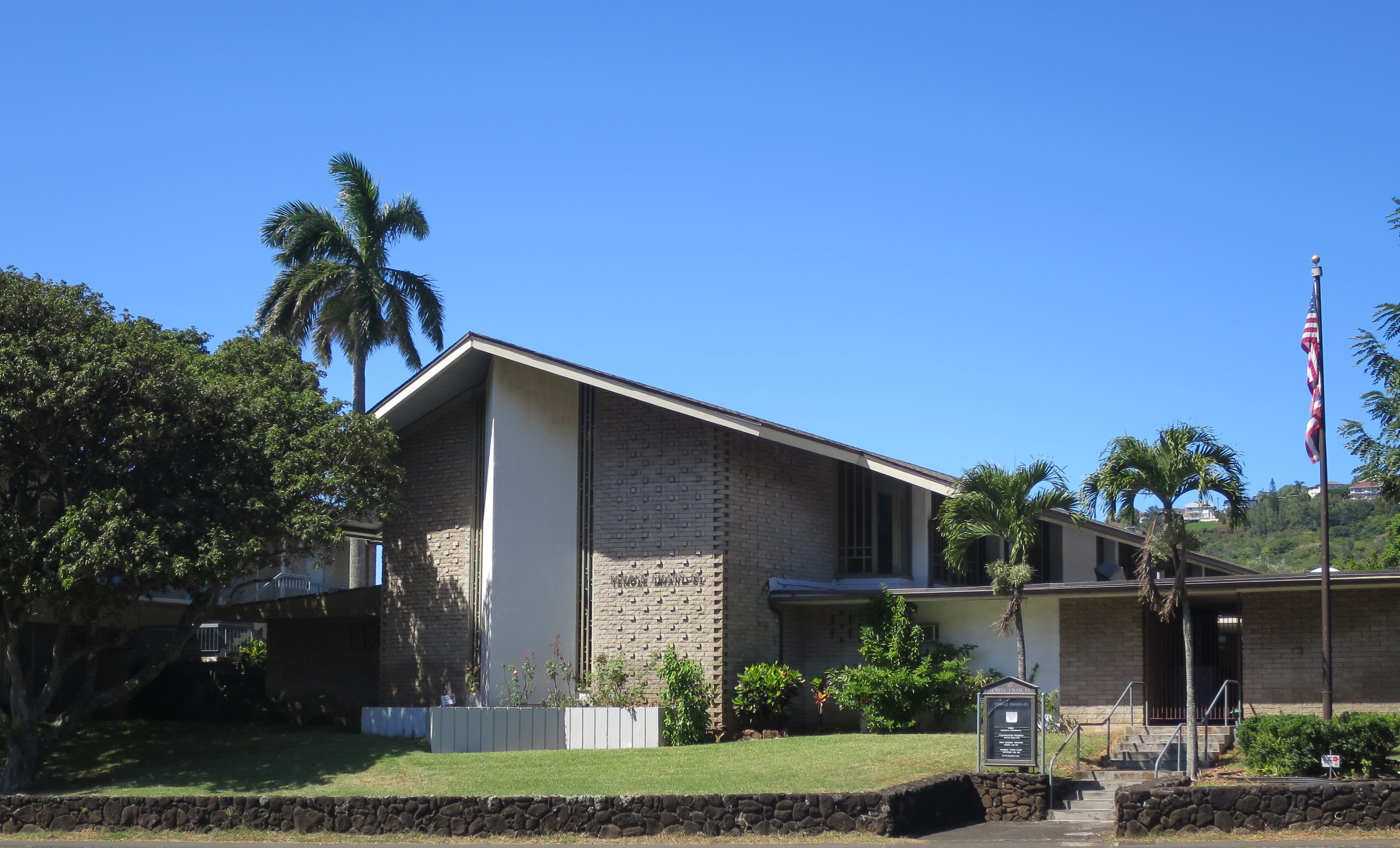
- Temple Emanu-El in 2016

- Location in Hawaii

Religion
- Affiliation: Reform Judaism
- Ecclesiastical or organizational status: Synagogue
- Leadership: Rabbi CJ Mays
- Year consecrated: 1960
- Status: Active

Location
- Location: 2550 Pali Highway, Honolulu, Hawaii
- Country: United States
- Interactive map of Temple Emanu-El
- Coordinates: 21°19′50″N 157°50′40″W

Architecture
- Architect: Edward Sullam
- Type: Synagogue
- General contractor: T. Takahashi
- Established: 1938 (as a congregation)
- Completed: 1960

Website
- shaloha.com

Temple Emanu-El is a Reform Jewish congregation and synagogue, located at 2550 Pali Highway, in Honolulu, Hawaii, in the United States. Founded in 1938, the congregation joined the Union for Reform Judaism in 1952, and the synagogue building was consecrated in 1960 under the spiritual leadership of Rabbi Roy A. Rosenberg. The architect was Edward Sullam, and the builder was T. Takahashi. The sanctuary is decorated with 12 8-foot (2.4 m) paintings by the New Mexico-based artist Alice Flitter.

== Educational programs ==
In addition to providing religious services on Shabbat and on holidays, Temple Emanu-El offers various educational programs for children and adults. The School of Jewish Studies (SJS) provides Jewish religious and cultural education for students in preschool through about 7th grade. Students typically graduate from SJS by having their b’nai mitzvah, after which several youth group experiences become available through 12th grade. Temple Emanu-El also offers a Torah Study program for adults.

== The Kalakaua Torah and yad ==
Elias Abraham Rosenberg came to Hawaii from San Francisco in 1886. Accounts vary as to whether or not he ever used the title “Rabbi”, but he was never ordained. He developed a friendship with King David Kalākaua, telling him stories from the Torah and teaching him the Hebrew language. In 1887, Rosenberg returned to San Francisco because of political unrest surrounding the Bayonet Constitution in Hawaii. He left his Torah and yad (Torah pointer) with Kalākaua for safe-keeping.

The Torah and yad remained in the royal family. The House of Kawānanakoa would lend the scroll to the Honolulu Jewish community for High Holy Day services until 1925 and possibly through the 1930s or into the 1940s. The yad eventually belonged to Kekaulike Kawānanakoa, granddaughter of Princess Abigail Kawānanakoa; Kekaulike gifted it to a friend who gave it to Temple Emanu-El in 1959.

After the death of Princess Abigail Kawānanakoa in 1945, the Torah was given to Flora Kaai Hayes for safekeeping. Following her death in 1968, she left it to her son, Homer A. Hayes. The location of the Torah had remained publicly unknown for 13 years after the donation of the yad, but was discovered in 1972 when Homer told Temple Emanu-El member Samuel Landau about the scroll. The Torah eventually passed into the Temple's ownership along with the yad. The Torah and yad are permanently displayed in the main sanctuary.

== Gallery ==
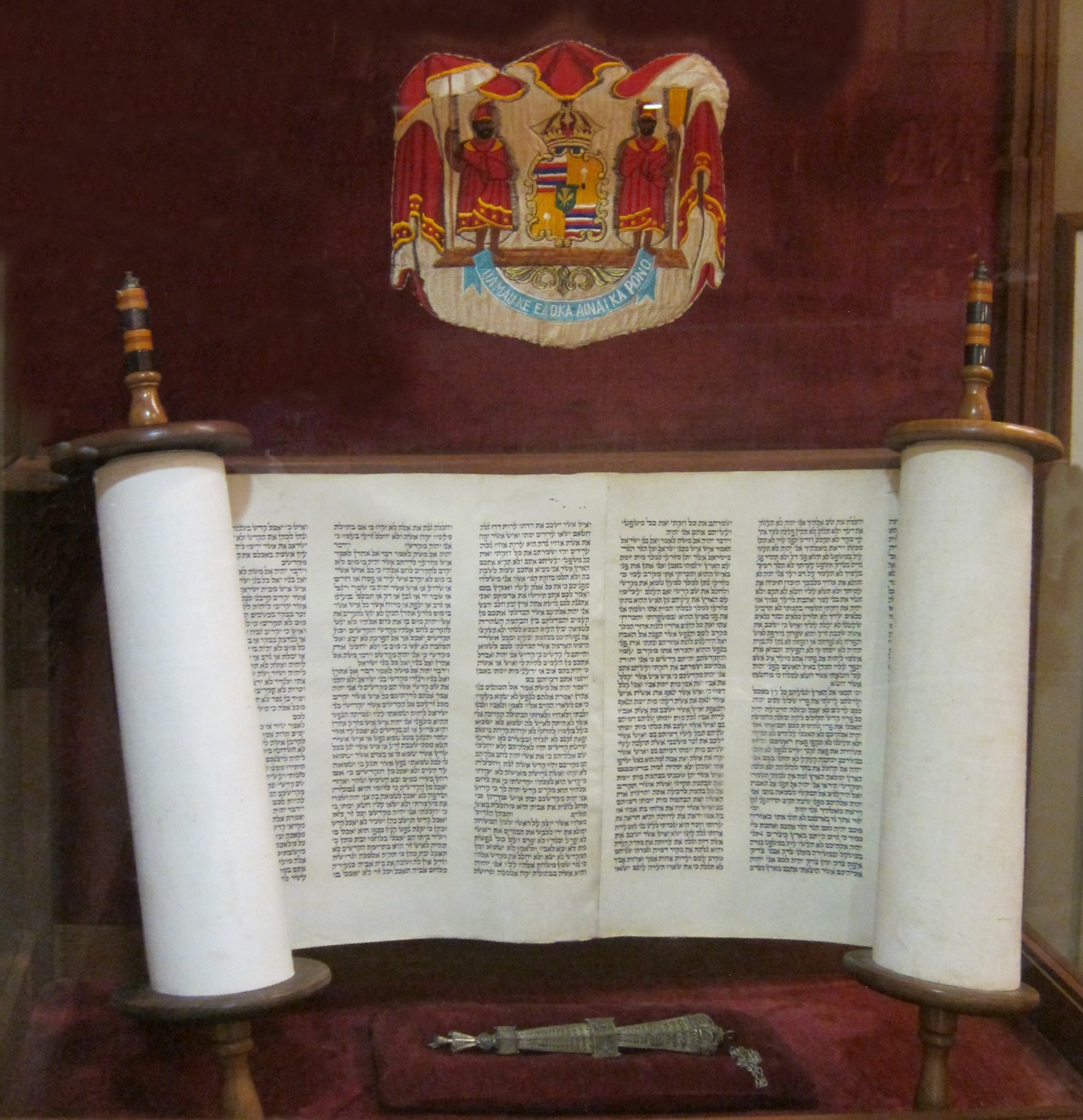
Torah and yad presented to King Kalākaua by Rosenberg.
