= Rotenberg =

Rotenberg may refer to:

== Places ==
- Places in Baden-Württemberg, Germany:
  - Rotenberg (Rauenberg)
  - Rotenberg (Stuttgart)
- Hills in Germany
  - Rotenberg (ridge), a hill range between Eichsfeld and Harz in Lower Saxony
  - Rotenberg (Kaiserslautern), a hill near Kaiserslautern-Erfenbach
  - Original name of Württemberg, a hill in Schurwald in Baden-Württemberg
  - Rotenberg (555 m), an outlier of the Rammert in the district of Tübingen in Baden-Württemberg
- Judge Rotenberg Educational Center, a special education school in Canton, Massachusetts

== People with the surname ==
- Arkady Rotenberg (born 1951), Russian businessman
- Boris Romanovitch Rotenberg (born 1957), Russian businessman
- Cristine Rotenberg (born 1988), Canadian YouTuber and actress
- Roman Rotenberg (born 1981), Russian businessman
- Boris Borisovich Rotenberg (born 1986), footballer
- Stéphane Rotenberg (born 1967), French journalist and television presenter
- Eric Rotenberg, American engineer
- Marc Rotenberg (born 1960), American lawyer

== See also ==
- Samara Routenberg (died 2017), American murder victim
- Rothenberg (disambiguation)
- Rotenburg (disambiguation)
- Rothenburg (disambiguation)
- Rottenburg (disambiguation)
- Rottenberg
- Rodenberg
