= Carl Gegenbaur =

German anatomist (1826–1903)

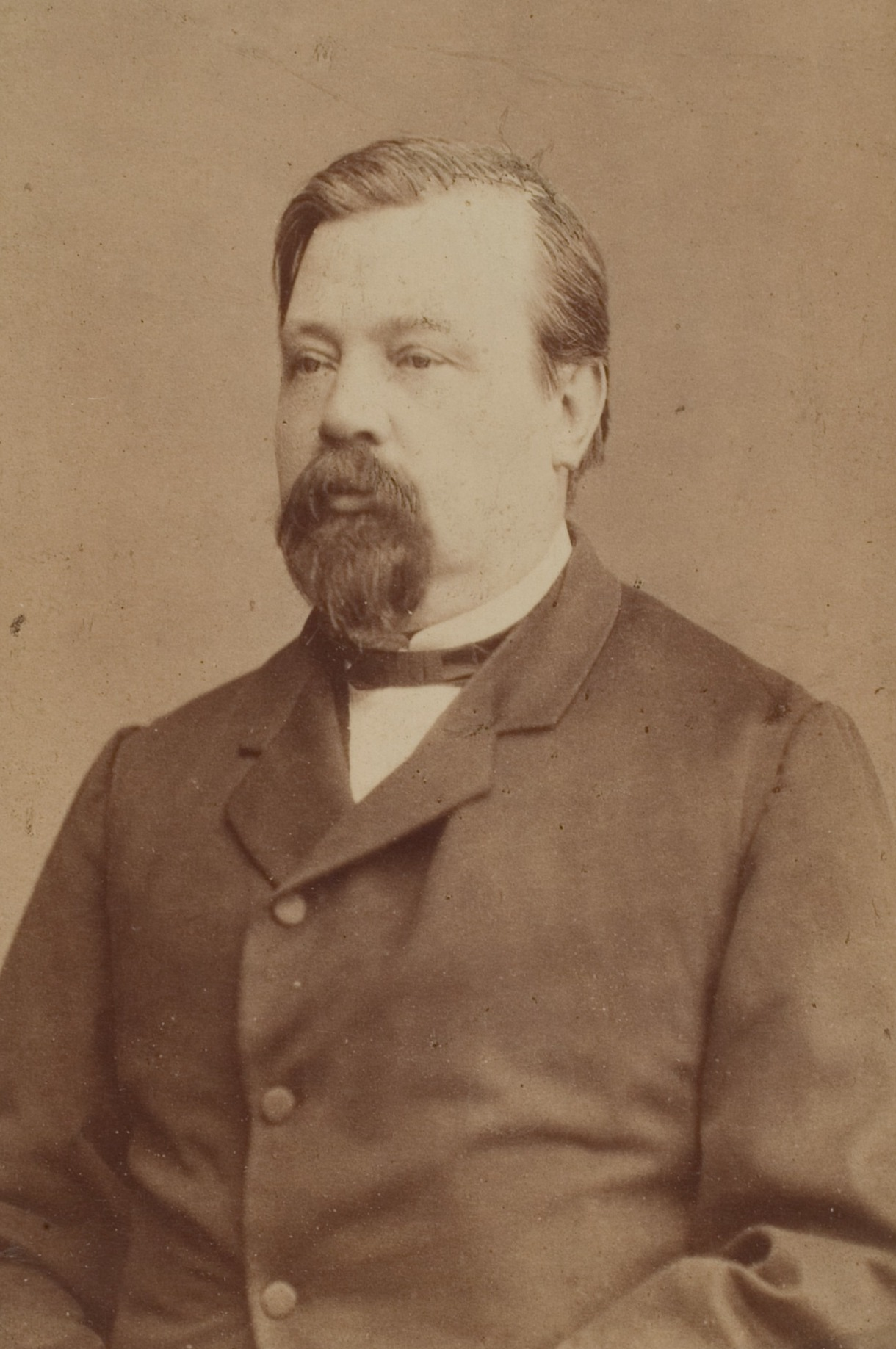
- Gegenbaur in 1886
- Born: 21 August 1826; Würzburg, Bavaria
- Died: 14 June 1903 (aged 76)
- Known for: use of homology in theory of evolution
- Awards: Copley Medal (1896)
- Scientific career
- Fields: Comparative anatomy
- Workplaces: University of Heidelberg, University of Jena

Carl Gegenbaur (21 August 1826 – 14 June 1903) was a German anatomist and professor who demonstrated that the field of comparative anatomy offers important evidence supporting of the theory of evolution. As a professor of anatomy at the University of Jena (1855–1873) and at the University of Heidelberg (1873–1903), Carl Gegenbaur was a strong supporter of Charles Darwin's theory of organic evolution, having taught and worked, beginning in 1858, with Ernst Haeckel, eight years his junior.

Gegenbaur's book Grundzüge der vergleichenden Anatomie (1859; English translation Elements of Comparative Anatomy by Francis Jeffrey Bell, 1878) became the standard textbook, at the time, of evolutionary morphology, emphasizing that structural similarities among various animals provide clues to their evolutionary history. Gegenbaur noted that the most reliable clue to evolutionary history is homology, the comparison of anatomical parts which have a common evolutionary origin.

Gegenbaur had been a student of Albert von Kölliker, Rudolf Virchow, Heinrich Müller and Franz Leydig (1821–1908).

== Life ==
Carl Gegenbaur was born in Würzburg, Bavaria, in 1826, and he entered the University of Würzburg as a student in 1845. After taking his degree in 1851, he spent some time in travelling in Italy and Sicily, before returning to Wurzburg as Privatdozent in 1854. In 1855, he was appointed extraordinary professor of anatomy at the University of Jena, and in 1858, he became the ordinary professor, where after 1865, his former student and fellow-worker Ernst Haeckel was professor of zoology. In 1873, Gegenbaur was appointed to Heidelberg, where he was professor of anatomy and director of the Anatomical Institute until his retirement in 1901.

In 1877 Gegenbaur was elected a Foreign Honorary Member of the Linnean Society of London. He was honoured as one of the greatest comparative anatomists of the day, because of his labours and philosophical investigations into the structure and development of both vertebrate and invertebrate animals.

Gegenbaur was elected a Foreign Honorary Member of the American Academy of Arts and Sciences in 1896.

He died on 14 June 1903 at Heidelberg.

== Impact ==
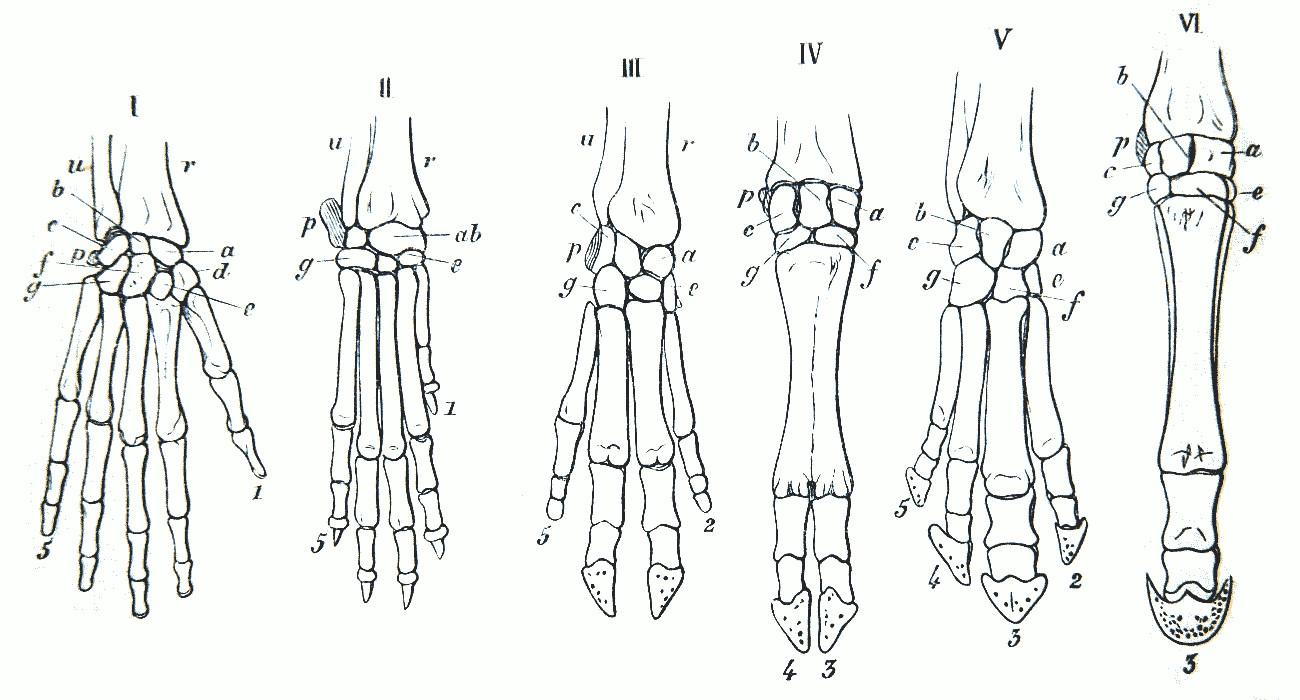
Gegenbaur: Homology of the hand to forelimbs (1870)

The work by which Gegenbaur is best known is his Grundriss der vergleichenden Anatomie (Leipzig, 1874; 2nd edition, 1878), translated into English by Francis Jeffrey Bell (as Elements of Comparative Anatomy, 1878), with additions by E. Ray Lankester. While recognizing the importance of comparative embryology in the study of descent, Gegenbaur laid stress on the higher value of comparative anatomy as the basis of the study of homologies, i.e. of the relations between corresponding parts in different animals, as, for example, the arm of man, with the foreleg of a horse, and with the wing of a fowl. A distinctive piece of work was effected by him in 1871 in supplementing the evidence adduced by Huxley in refutation of the skull-vertebrae theory: the theory of the origin of the skull from expanded vertebrae, which, formulated independently by Goethe and Oken, had been championed by Owen. Huxley demonstrated that the skull is built up of cartilaginous pieces; Gegenbaur showed that in the lowest (gristly) fishes, where hints of the original vertebrae might be most expected, the skull is an unsegmented gristly brain-box, and that in higher forms, the vertebral nature of the skull cannot be maintained, since many of the bones, notably those along the top of the skull, arise in the skin.

In 1858, the physician Ernst Haeckel studied under Gegenbaur at Jena, receiving a doctorate in zoology (after his medical degree), and became a professor at the same institution, the University of Jena. Ernst Haeckel expanded on the ideas of Gegenbaur while advocating the concepts of Charles Darwin.

In 1861, he published "Ueber den Bau und die Entwickelung der Wirbelthier-Eier mit partielleer Dotterbildung" ("Proof that the ovum is unicellular in all vertebrates", Arch. Anat. Phys., 1861.8: 461–529), a fundamental proof in embryology.

Gegenbaur learned techniques as a student of Albert von Kölliker, Rudolf Virchow, Heinrich Müller and Franz Leydig (1821–1908). Carl Gegenbaur had a strong influence on his environment, with his colleagues Matthias Jakob Schleiden, Emil Huschke, Ernst Haeckel, and Hermann Klaatsch (1863–1916). Carl Gegenbaur also influenced his students, including: Max Fürbringer, Richard Hertwig, Oskar Hertwig, Emil Rosenberg, Ambrosius Hubrecht, Johan Erik Vesti Boas (1855–1935), Hans Friedrich Gadow, Georg Ruge M. Sagemehl, N. Goronowitsch, H. K. Corning, C. Röse and S. Paulli.

Gegenbaur's research program of comparative morphology incorporating ontogeny and phylogeny is still evident in the burgeoning field of evolutionary developmental biology (evo-devo).

== Honors ==
In 1888 he was awarded honorary membership of the Manchester Literary and Philosophical Society. and in 1897, Gegenbaur was named an honorary member of the American Association for Anatomy.

== Other publications ==
Other publications by Carl Gegenbaur include a Text-book of Human Anatomy (Leipzig, 1883, new ed. 1903), the Epiglottis (1892), and Comparative Anatomy of the Vertebrates in relation to the Invertebrates (Leipzig, 2 volumes, 1898–1901). In 1875, he founded the Morphologisches Jahrbuch ("Morphological Yearbook"), which he edited for many years. In 1901 he published a short autobiography under the title Erlebtes und Erstrebtes (German "experiencing and striving").
