= Rothenburg =

Rothenburg is a German language placename and refers to:

== Places ==
- Rothenburg ob der Tauber, Bavaria, Germany
- Rothenburg, Oberlausitz, Saxony, Germany
- Rothenburg, Saxony-Anhalt, Saxony-Anhalt, Germany
- Rothenburg, Switzerland, Canton of Lucerne, Switzerland
- Rothenburg (Lothringen), a castle ruin in Lorraine, France
- Rothenburg (Thüringen), a castle ruin in Thuringia, Germany
- Rothenburg an der Oder, the German name of Czerwieńsk, Poland

== People with the surname ==
- Glenn Rothenburg, the birthname of American actor Glenn Corbett (1930–1993)
- Heinz-Joachim Rothenburg (born 1944), East German shot putter
- Karl Rothenburg (1894–1941), German Wehrmacht officer

== See also ==
- Meir of Rothenburg (Maharam of Rothenburg, 1215–1293), a major medieval German rabbi
- Rotenburg (disambiguation)
- Rottenburg (disambiguation)
- Rothenberg (disambiguation)
- Rotenberg (disambiguation)
