= Villa Jacoby =

Building in Tallinn

Coordinates: 59°25′59″N 24°44′06″E

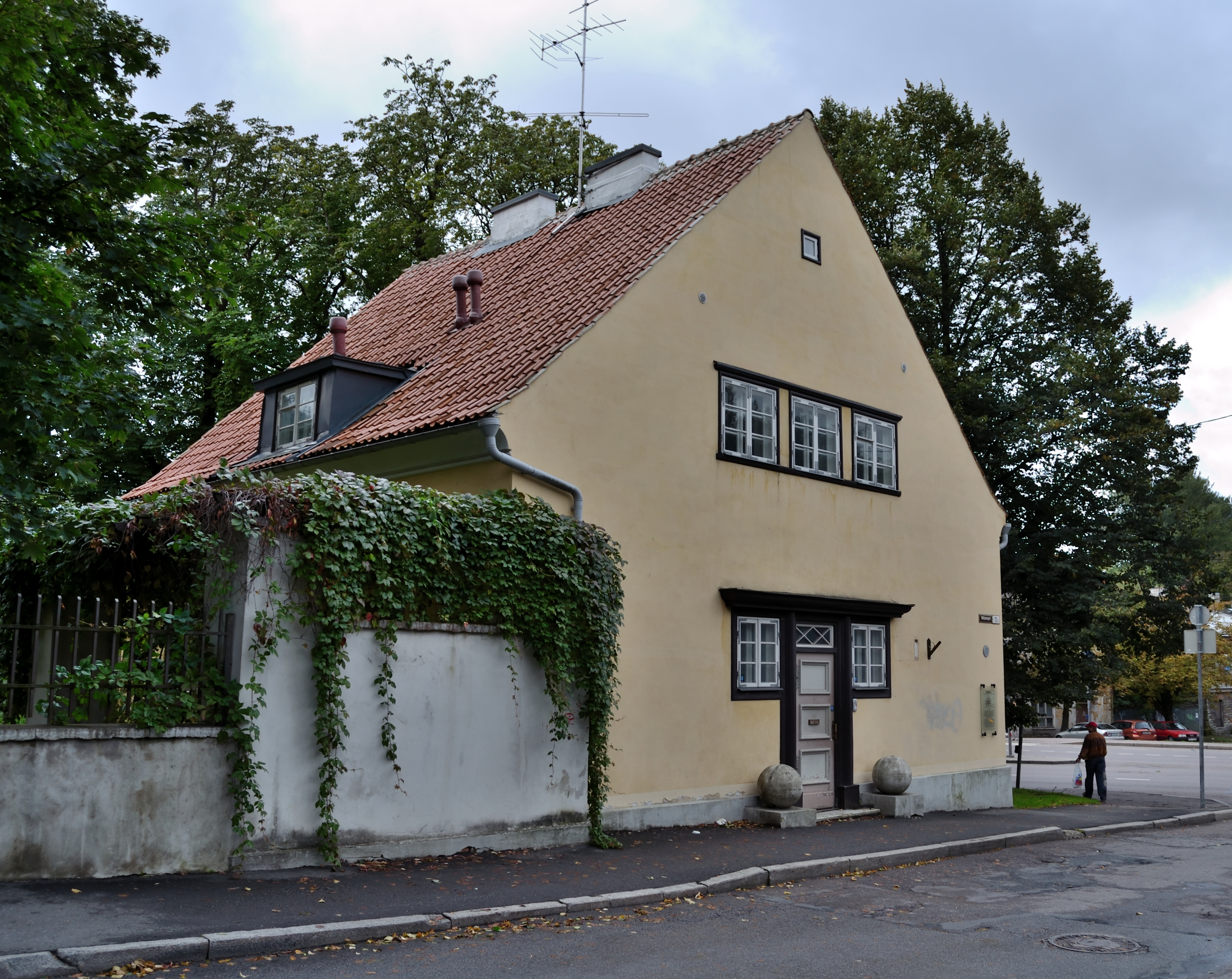
Villa Jacoby before renovation - picture taken in September 2011

Villa Jacoby is a 1920s home in Estonian architecture. It is known for baroque-style windows and influences of expressionism and Estonian traditional architecture (gable roof). The house is located on Wismari street 11, which is the beginning of the Old Town of Tallinn.

The home was built in 1924 by the well-known Baltic-German architect Erich Roman Ludvig Jacoby. Jacoby designed the home as his personal residence. The building's initial project was completed in 1923; the final project and building were finished in 1924. The architectural solution follows the conservatism of the 1920s which was greatly influenced by 17th and 18th century Baroque styles.

The architecture has several references to the Old Town of Tallinn including white-washed roof ridges and Baroque door hinges. Initially, a late medieval lintel stone internal portal had been walled to the pergola internal wall with the owner's family signs and the year 1596. That stone has since been moved to Tallinn City Museum.

During the Soviet Period, the building was used as communal style shared living quarters. From 2000 to 2011 the building was used as the office of the Estonian political party Patriotic League Isamaalitt. The building is registered as Building monument no. 8558.
