= Georg Ruge =

German anatomist and primatologist

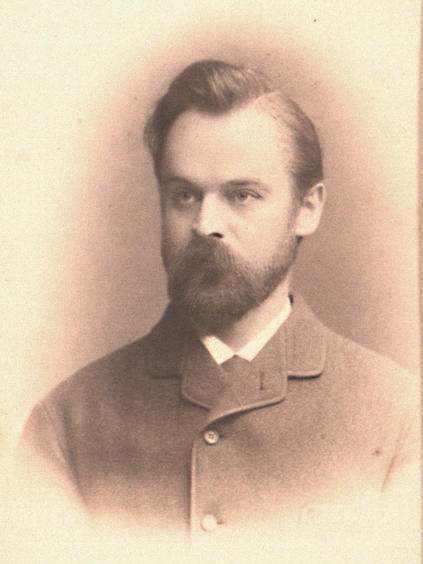
Georg Ruge

Georg Ruge (June 19, 1852 – January 21, 1919) was a German anatomist and primatologist who was a native of Berlin.

In 1875, he earned his doctorate at the University of Berlin, and later became an assistant to Carl Gegenbaur (1826-1903) in Heidelberg. At Heidelberg he performed important research involving primate morphology, particularly studies of its muscular system. In the mid-1880s he authored works that provided a foundation for comparative anatomical and phylogenetic studies on facial muscles in mammals.

In 1888 Ruge became a professor of anatomy at the University of Amsterdam, and in 1897 obtained the same position at the University of Zurich. Among his better known publications are the following works:

- Beiträge zum Wachsthum des menschlichen Unterkiefers (Contributions to the growth of the human mandible). dissertation
- Eintheilung der Gesichtsmuskulatur (Division of the facial muscles).
- Untersuchungen über die Gesichtsmuskulatur der Primaten, 1887—Studies of the facial muscles of primates.
- Über die Gesichtsmuskulatur der Halbaffen (On the facial muscles of lemurs).
- Leitfaden für Präparirübungen
- Über die peripherischen Gebilde des N. facialis bei Wirbelthieren (On the structure of peripheral facial nerve in vertebrates).
