= Erich Jacoby =

Estonian architect

Erich Roman Ludvig Jacoby (16 June 1885 in Tallinn, Estonia – 10 December 1941 in Gdynia, Poland) was an Estonian architect of Baltic German descent. From 1905 to 1907 he studied at the Leibniz University of Hannover, in 1913 he graduated from the Riga Technical University. In 1939 he went to Germany.

Jacoby has designed many notable buildings in Tallinn, many of which are influenced by expressionism, Art Nouveau, and in 1930s — functionalism. Among his notable creations is Villa Jacoby.

== Gallery ==
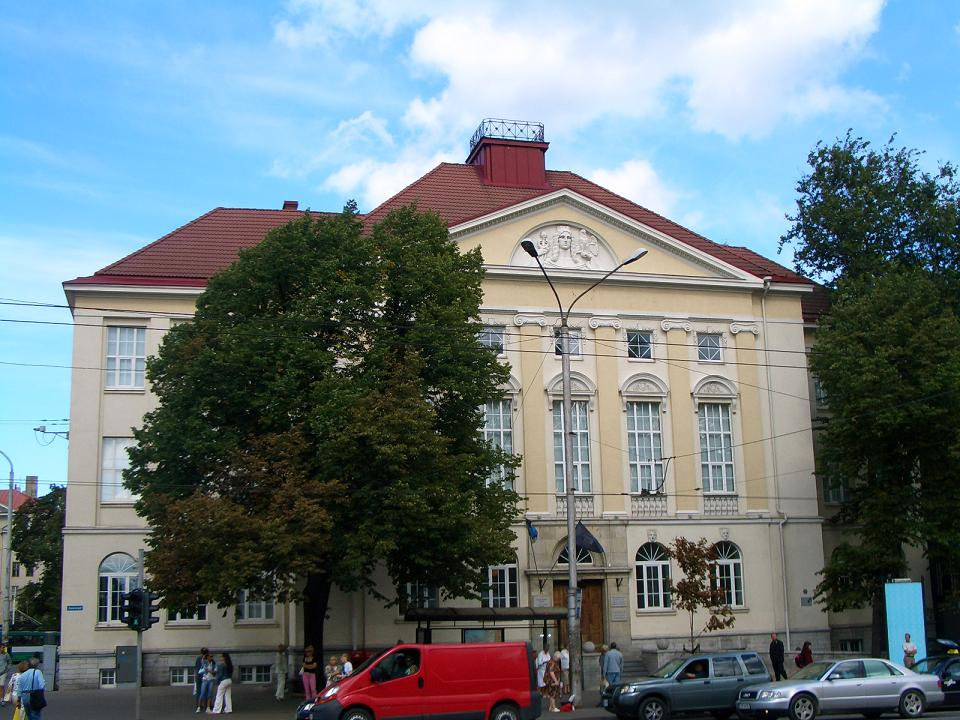
Tallinn English College (with Aleksander Rosenberg), from 1916.

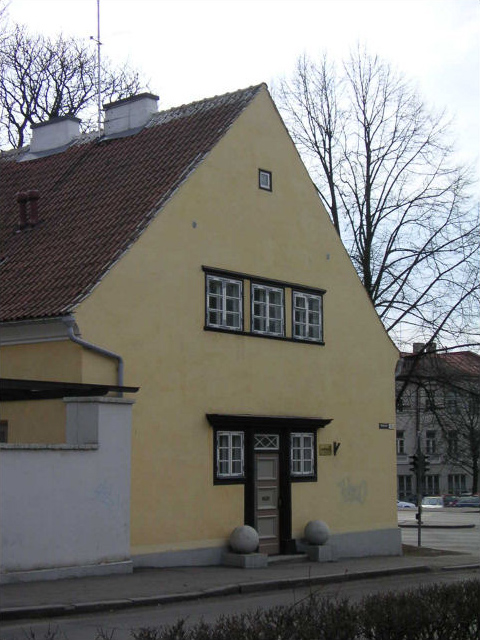
Villa Jacoby on Wismari street 11 - a perfect example of 1920's Estonian architecture. With baroque-style windows, influence of expressionism and Estonian traditional architecture (gable roof).

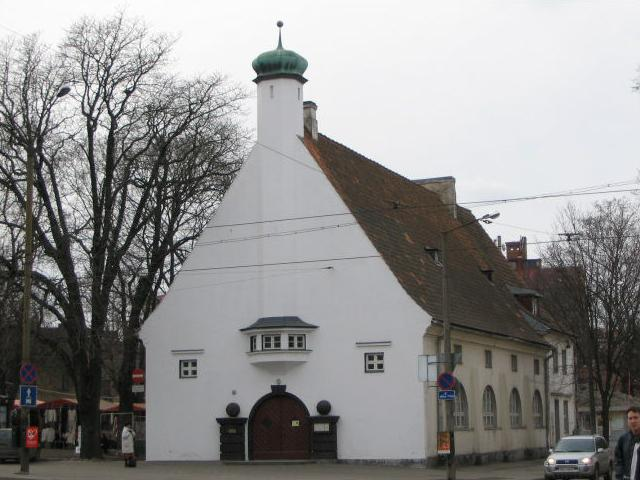
Advent church on Mere avenue in Tallinn, built in 1923.

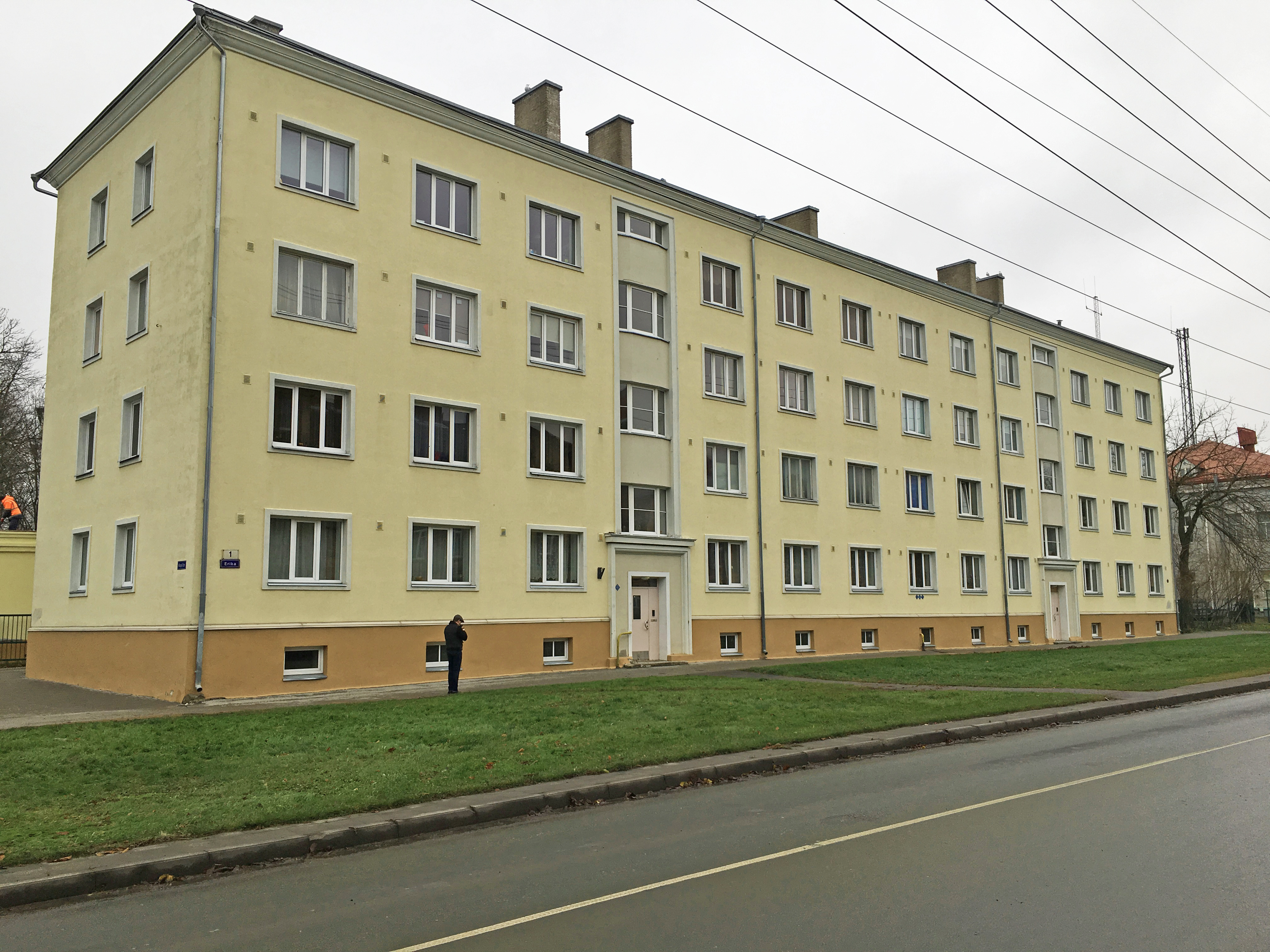
Erika Street 1, Tallinn, built in 1939.

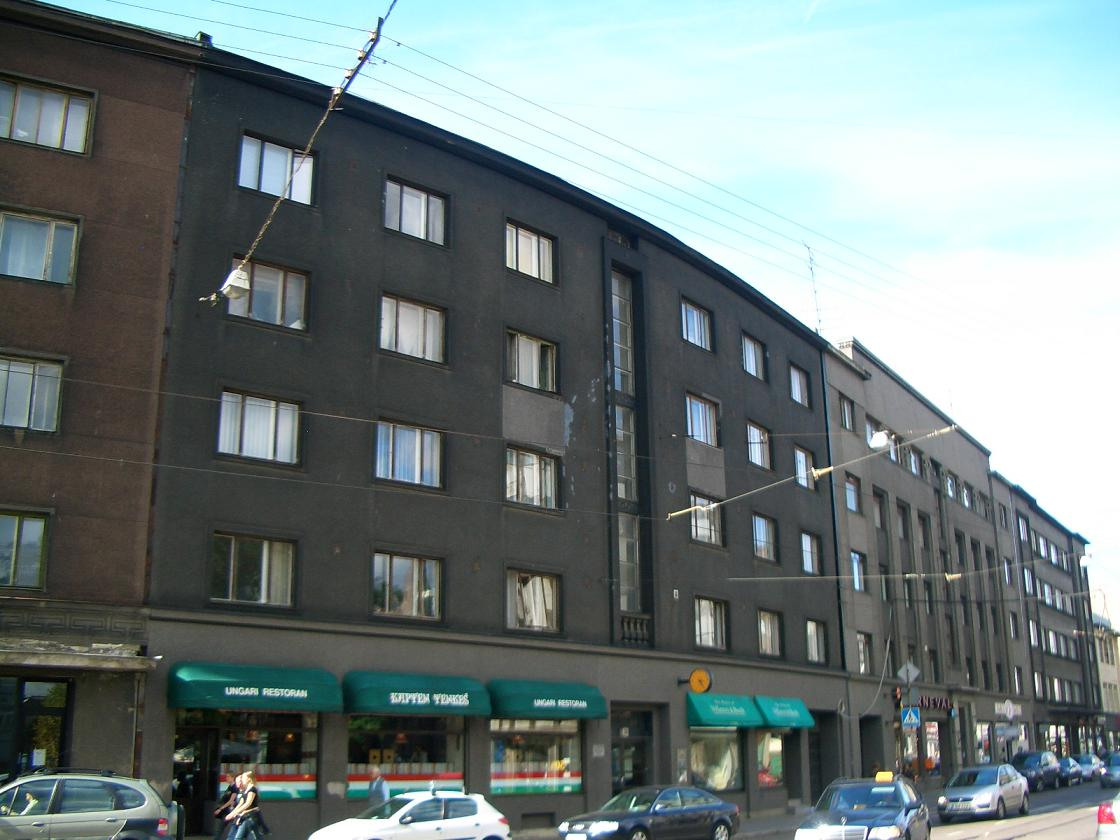
Pärnu road 30, built in 1936.

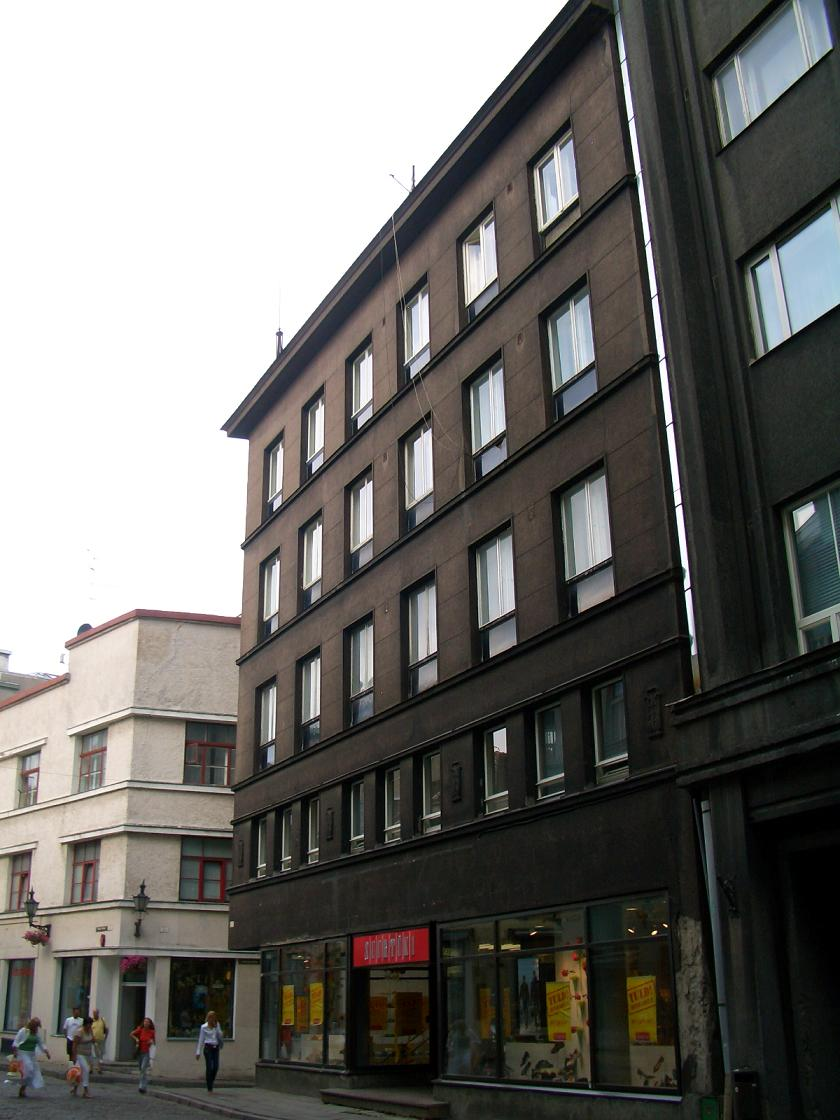
A late functionalistic apartment building in the Old Town of Tallinn, built in 1937 with H.Berg.

== See also ==
- List of Baltic German architects
