= Pascal Bonafoux =

French art historian

- Born: 1949 (age 76–77); Paris, France
- Occupations: Art historian, curator, journalist, novelist
- Awards: Grand prix du Jury de La Nuit du Livre

Pascal Bonafoux (born 1949) is a French writer, novelist, art critic and art historian, a specialist in self-portraiture. He collaborates with various newspapers and magazines, he is the author of numerous essays dedicated to art and was a resident at the French Academy in Rome. He is professor of art history at Paris 8 University, and is also a curator who organises exhibitions either in France or abroad.

== Biography ==
Bonafoux was born in Paris in 1949. After his doctoral dissertation L'autoportrait dans la peinture occidentale ('Self-Portrait in Western Painting'), he resided at the Villa Medici in Italy from 1980 to 1981, where he wrote essays for the French Academy in Rome and fell in love with this country – the genius of Leonardo da Vinci, Michelangelo or Giuseppe Verdi; the beauty of its churches and palaces; the charm of its squares, terraces and alleys. Since then, he has continued to travel the peninsula to explore its rich art and culture.

From 1987 to 1988, he directed the exhibition office of Association française d'action artistique, which is a delegated operator of the Ministry of Europe and Foreign Affairs. He has curated various exhibitions devoted to Rembrandt, Van Gogh, Renoir and Monet, as well as those dedicated to the works of contemporary artists in Bratislava, Dublin, Prague, Tel Aviv, East Asia, et cetera. In 1988 and 1990, he chaired the jury of the first two biennials of film about art at Centre Georges Pompidou.

He became a councillor of several Slovakian ministers of culture after Czechoslovakia's Velvet Revolution in 1989, he received the Cena ministra kultúry Slovenskej republiky ('Prize of the Minister of Culture of the Slovak Republic') in 1991.

As a journalist, he has collaborated with various newspapers and magazines, including Connaissance des Arts, L'ŒIL, L'OBS, Le Magazine Littéraire, Le Monde ... He is currently a columnist of the French magazine Art Absolument.

Bonafoux is also a professor who teaches art history at the Paris 8 University and has been leading conferences on topics related to art history for the reference organisation Clio, to quality audiences as well as to amateurs and the curious.

He has published more than 20 books at Éditions Gallimard, including Van Gogh : Le soleil en face, a heavily illustrated book for the pocket collection "Découvertes Gallimard", which was one of the bestsellers in France.

== Selected publications ==
- Portraits of the Artist: The Self-Portrait in Painting, Rizzoli International Publications, 1985
- Rembrandt: Self-Portrait, Rizzoli International Publications, 1985
- The Impressionists: Portraits and Confidences, Rizzoli International Publications, 1986
- Van Gogh : Le soleil en face, collection « Découvertes Gallimard » (nº 17), série Arts. Éditions Gallimard, 1987
  - UK edition – Van Gogh: The Passionate Eye, 'New Horizons' series, Thames & Hudson, 1992
  - US edition – Van Gogh: The Passionate Eye, "Abrams Discoveries" series. Harry N. Abrams, 1992
- Van Gogh: Self Portraits With Accompanying Letters from Vincent to His Brother Theo, Wellfleet Press, 1989
- Rembrandt : Le clair, l'obscur, collection « Découvertes Gallimard » (nº 76), série Arts. Éditions Gallimard, 1990
  - UK edition – Rembrandt: Substance and Shadow, 'New Horizons' series. Thames & Hudson, 1992
  - US edition – Rembrandt: Master of the Portrait, "Abrams Discoveries" series. Harry N. Abrams, 1992
- A Weekend with Rembrandt, Rizzoli, 1992
- Van Gogh, Konecky & Konecky, 1998
- Vermeer, William S. Konecky Associates, 1999
- Van Gogh : L'atelier d'Arles, collection « Découvertes Gallimard Hors série ». Éditions Gallimard, 2002
- Autoportraits du XX^{e} siècle, collection « Découvertes Gallimard Hors série ». Éditions Gallimard, 2004
- Chefs-d'œuvre de la Collection Phillips, collection « Découvertes Gallimard Hors série ». Éditions Gallimard, 2005
- With David Rosenberg, Louvre Game Book: Play with the Largest Museum in the World, Assouline Publishing, 2005
- With Catherine Alestchenkoff, Yves Clerc, Skira, 2008
- With Gilles Targat, Behind the Scenes in Versailles, Hachette-Livre, 2010
- Cézanne, portrait, Hazan, 2011
- Rodin & Eros, Thames & Hudson, 2013
