= Pointer (rod) =

Solid rod used to point to things

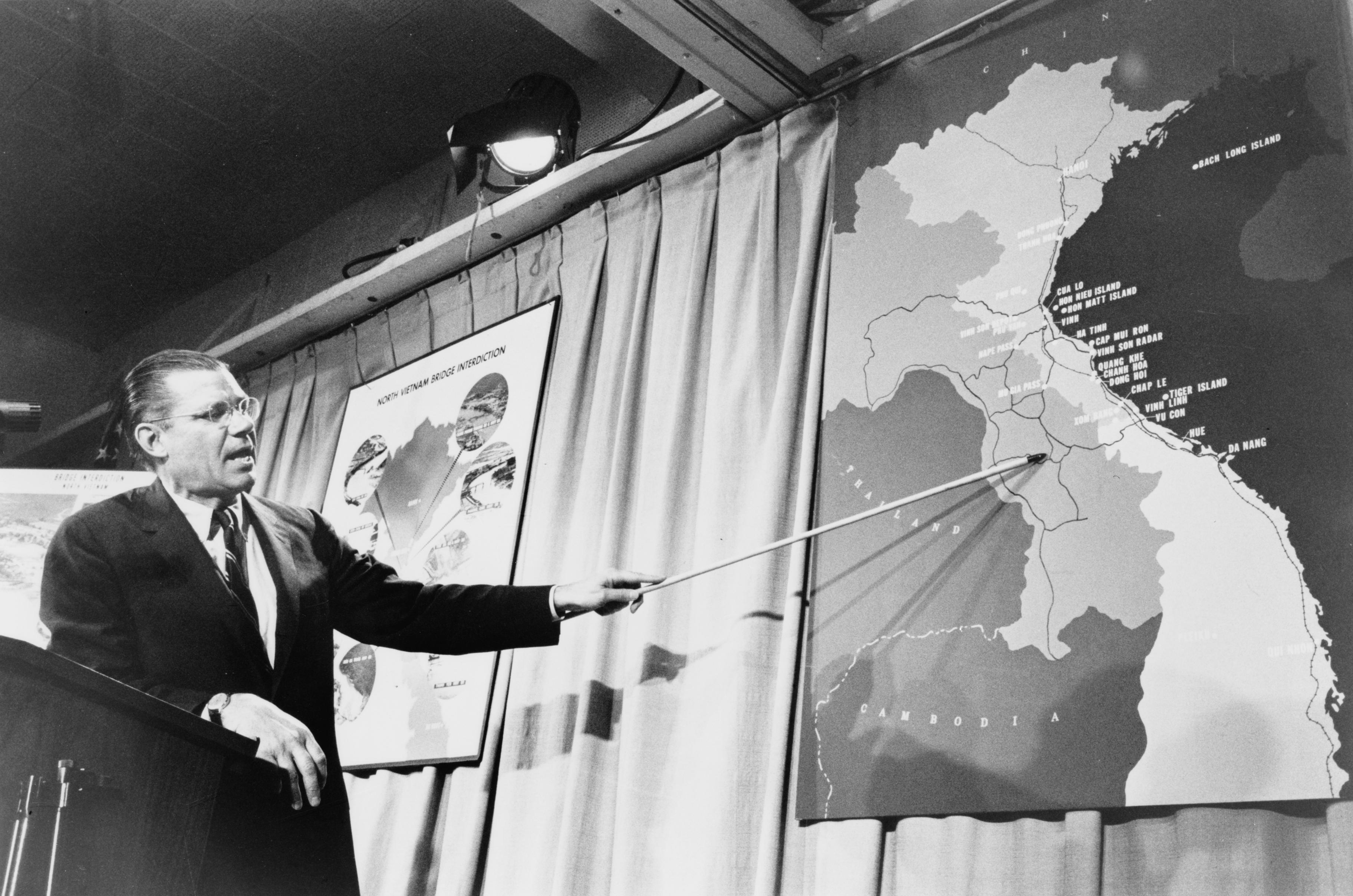
Robert McNamara points at a North Vietnam map using a pointing stick.

A pointer or pointing stick is a solid rod used to point manually, in the form of a stick, but always finished off or artificially produced.

The typical pointer is simply a long, slender, and often flexible stick made in a strong material, designed to indicate specific places on maps, words on blackboards etc. It may be used like any ordinary stick for other purposes, e.g. for punitive caning (compare rulering).

Some are telescopic and can be carried in a pocket like a pen.

== See also ==
- Fescue – a pointer used to help children learn to read
- Yad – a Jewish ritual pointer used during the Torah reading
