= Elias Abraham Rosenberg =

Merchant and fortune teller

Elias Abraham Rosenberg (Hebrew: אליאס אברהם רוזנברג; Hawaiian: Eliaka Apelahama Loselabeka; c. 1810 – July 10, 1887) was a Jewish immigrant to the United States who, despite a questionable past, became a trusted friend and adviser of King Kalākaua of Hawaii. Regarded as eccentric, he lived in San Francisco in the 1880s and worked as a peddler selling illegal lottery tickets. In 1886, he traveled to Hawaii and performed as a fortune-teller. He came to Kalākaua's attention, and endeared himself to the king with favorable predictions about the future of Hawaii. Rosenberg received royal appointments to several positions: kahuna-kilokilo (royal soothsayer), customs appraiser, and guard. He was given lavish gifts by the king, but was mistrusted by other royal advisers and satirized in the Hawaiian press.

Rosenberg and Kalākaua often held long conversations and enjoyed drinking alcohol together; Rosenberg told the king Bible stories and encouraged him to revive traditional Hawaiian religion, an idea that fascinated Kalākaua but angered his political rivals. In June 1887, Rosenberg returned to California, possibly owing to poor health or fear of unrest in Hawaii; a short time after arriving in San Francisco, he died in a local hospital. Soon after his departure from Hawaii, the June 1887 Constitution—which curtailed royal power—was forced upon Kalākaua. A Torah scroll and yad presented to the king by Rosenberg remained in the royal collection. These artifacts were later exhibited with other royal treasures and eventually donated to Temple Emanu-El in Honolulu.

== San Francisco ==
Few details are definitively known about Rosenberg's life before he traveled to Hawaii. He is believed to have been a Russian Jew born c. 1810, and possibly lived in Australia (Note: While in Australia, Rosenberg may have collected emu eggs that he later sold as curiosities. (Nodel 1996, p. 360)) and England. He was married and divorced three times, and had several children.

By the early 1880s, Rosenberg lived in San Francisco, California, where he was a well-known figure, regarded as an eccentric, an "adventurer", and a "curio". There he worked as a peddler and, in 1884, served as a director for the Chebra Beth Abraham benevolent society. He illegally sold lottery tickets for a time, but ceased the practice after he attracted attention from the San Francisco Police Department. These problems might have led to his move to Hawaii.

== Hawaii ==
Rosenberg traveled from San Francisco to Hawaii, possibly on a whaler, arriving in Oahu sometime before December 1886. At that time, Hawaii was a predominantly Christian kingdom; Christian missionaries had successfully converted a large segment of the population after traditional Hawaiian religion was suppressed by the monarchy. In the 1880s, however, King Kalākaua encouraged the revival of Hawaiian traditions, hoping to inspire nationalistic sentiment. He revived traditional Hawaiian music and dance, including hula, and observed some practices of Hawaiian religion. Kalākaua became a powerful king, unconstrained by political factors.

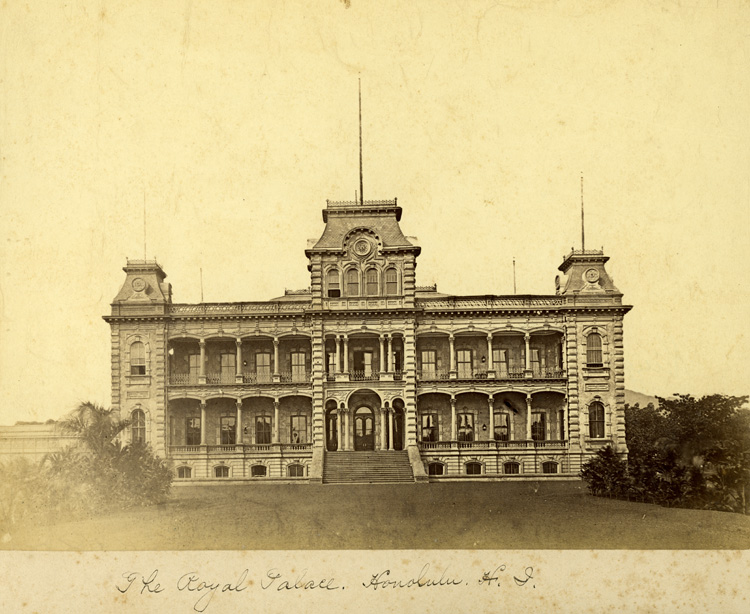
ʻIolani Palace in 1885

In Hawaii, Rosenberg was known for his long white beard and his personality, which was described by those who knew him as charming and witty. He cast optimistic horoscopes for anyone who asked, and soon became popular with Hawaiians. He was nicknamed "Rosey", owing to his cheery attitude and witty remarks. After Rosenberg became well known, he came to the attention of King Kalākaua, who granted him a royal audience. Rosenberg was present at a birthday celebration for King Kalākaua at ʻIolani Palace in November 1886. Rosenberg's fame led to satire: he regularly appeared in a Hawaiian Gazette gossip column, which mockingly called him "Holy Moses", and was satirized by a troupe of amateur minstrels at the Hawaii Opera House. In February 1887, he paid for a notice to be placed in The Honolulu Advertiser, in which he claimed to have lost a letter that was sent to him by Queen Victoria. There has been speculation that the advertisement was a hoax designed by Rosenberg to lend himself prestige.

King Kalākaua trusted Rosenberg's skill as a fortune teller, perhaps because the way Rosenberg chanted in Hebrew reminded him of ancient Hawaiian rites. In January 1887, the king—who had become increasingly autocratic and was facing several scandals—granted Rosenberg a private audience at the palace. The king and Rosenberg became close, and routinely visited each other for several days at a time and held long conversations. During the audiences, Rosenberg told Bible stories and read from the Talmud. He began to teach the king basic Hebrew, and gave him an ornate Torah and yad that he had brought with him to Hawaii. (Note: In the 1960s, journalist Bernard Postal consulted a jeweler who estimated its "intrinsic worth" as less than $100. Postal notes, however, that the item was worth much more than that sum owing to its historical value. (Honolulu, 1967)) He also claimed to have found references to Hawaii in ancient Hebrew texts, a statement that encouraged the king to restore aspects of Hawaiian religion. The king had previously sought instruction from several people he regarded as prophets and had established a society dedicated to the revival of native Hawaiian traditions. Finally, the king declared Rosenberg his kahuna-kilokilo, a royal soothsayer.

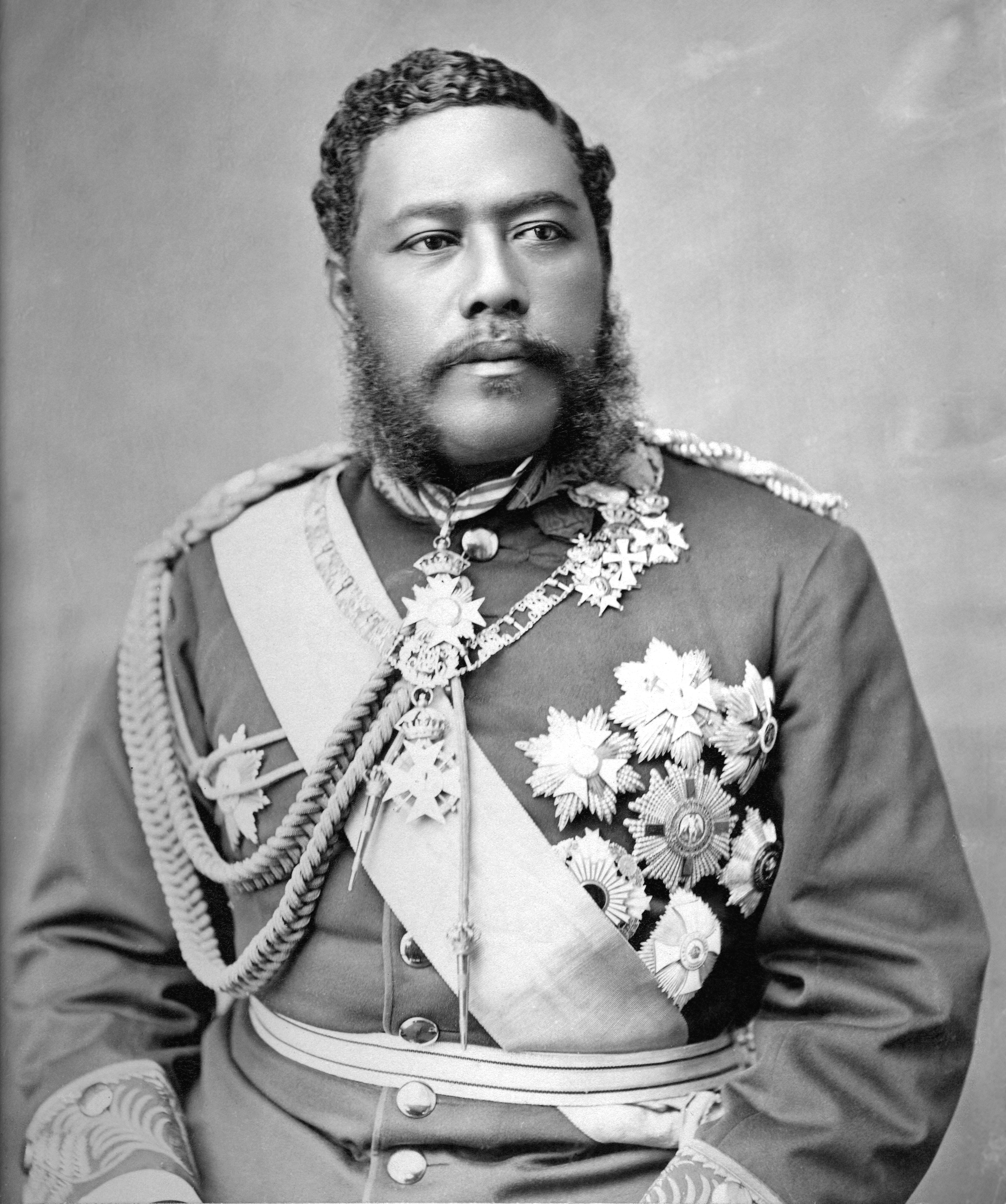
King Kalākaua in 1882

Rosenberg was granted a room in the palace to use for fortune telling, which the king made sure was stocked with alcohol, as they enjoyed drinking together. In late January, the king appointed Rosenberg as a customs appraiser in Honolulu, although the appointment was controversial; by mid-February he was fired by the head of customs. One month later, Rosenberg was reappointed by order of the king and the following month the head of customs resigned. Archibald Scott Cleghorn, the king's brother-in-law, was appointed as the new head of customs. Between March and May 1887, Rosenberg was paid $300, ostensibly for working as a guard at the Customs Office, although it was alleged that Rosenberg's position was a sinecure.

On June 1, the king gave Rosenberg a gold medal, (Note: The medal was roughly the size of a $5 gold coin, (The Daily Bulletin, 1887) about 21 millimetres (0.83 in) in diameter.) a silver cup, and $260. (Note: The payment of $260 may have been given to Rosenberg so he could buy passage to California; the Torah and yad might have been left in Hawaii as security for the loan. (Nodel 1996, p. 359 & Postal & Koppman 1986, p. 170)) The cup and the obverse of the medal were inscribed with the words "His Majesty Kalākaua I to Abraham Rosenberg". The reverse side of the medal featured a profile of the king; a gold crown on the rim attached the coin to a blue ribbon. The following week, the king made a payment of $100 to a local jeweler, but it is not known whether it was for the gifts given to Rosenberg.

Some royal advisers, who were angered by the trust the king placed in Rosenberg, regarded him with suspicion. For example, Walter M. Gibson, the Prime Minister of Hawaii, noted that King Kalākaua withheld most of the specific details of his conversations with Rosenberg from him. Kalākaua was stripped of much of his power by the June 1887 Constitution, which significantly weakened the Hawaiian monarchy.

== Return to San Francisco and death ==
Rosenberg left Hawaii on June 7, 1887, booking steerage class passage on the steamer Australia. Some reports state that he left owing to health issues, although others suggest that Rosenberg departed the island because he was concerned about political unrest. He left three weeks before the king signed the June Constitution. Rosenberg returned to San Francisco, but was hospitalized within a month of his return, and died on July 10, 1887. He spoke of King Kalākaua on his deathbed, whispering the king's name with his dying breath. He was buried at the cemetery of Congregation Sherith Israel in the San Francisco Peninsula; brief death notices were published in Hawaii- and San Francisco-based newspapers.

Rosenberg left a will in which he requested that his body be cremated using quicklime. (Note: During the cremation process, Rosenberg's body was placed in a zinc casket, covered in lime, and soaked with water. His bones were later buried at the cemetery. (Nodel 1996, p. 360)) Most of his estate was left to his children; (Note: The Daily Alta California reported that Rosenberg's estate was worth $1,000 at the time of his death, of which $700 was split between his children and his wife. According to the paper, $300 was left to the executors of his will. Nodel states that Rosenberg's estate may have been worth up to $6,000, and that it was split between his children and charitable donations. (Daily Alta California, 1887 & Nodel 1996, p. 360)) the will stated that his Torah and yad were to be given to his son Adolph, but this was not done as they remained in Hawaii.

== Legacy ==
In 1888, the Torah and yad Rosenberg left with King Kalākaua were included in an exhibition of royal possessions at a bazaar held by King Kalākaua's wife, Queen Kapiolani. After King Kalākaua's death in 1891, his stepson David Kawānanakoa inherited the items. When Kawānanakoa's wife, Abigail Campbell Kawānanakoa, inherited them after David's death, she loaned them to members of the Hawaiian Jewish community on religious holidays. Her granddaughter, Abigail Kinoiki Kekaulike Kawānanakoa, later acquired the items. The yad was bequeathed to Temple Emanu-El in 1959, and formally dedicated for use in Torah readings the next year. The Torah was lost in the 1940s, but was recovered in 1972 when a Honolulu attorney found the scroll in the possessions of a recently deceased client and donated it to the temple. (Note: In 1967, Honolulu magazine reported that most Hawaiians believed that the Torah had been the possession of an American rabbi who stopped in Hawaii during a Pacific voyage, rather than the possession of a royal adviser. (Honolulu, 1967)) The Torah had been damaged and could not be used in services, but the temple later installed a plaque describing Rosenberg below a glass display case housing the Torah and yad.

Although Rosenberg's Torah was a prized possession of the royal family, there were no recorded Jewish religious services in Hawaii until years after his death. The first Jewish temple in Hawaii was not built until 70 years after Rosenberg presented the Torah to King Kalākaua. Although Rosenberg styled himself as "Rabbi Rosenberg"—and the king promised him a plot of land for a synagogue—there is no evidence that he was a rabbi.

William DeWitt Alexander advanced a negative view of Rosenberg in a late 19th-century history of Hawaii, characterizing him as an accomplice to what he saw as the king's "efforts to revive heathenism". A 2008 article in Honolulu magazine also advanced an unfavorable characterization of Rosenberg: a writer for the publication described him as a "smooth talker" and compared him to the 19th-century industrialist Claus Spreckels, arguing that each was a "huckster basking in the rays of Kalākaua's power". A more positive description was offered in the Canadian Jewish Chronicle in 1938 by Harry Rubenstein, who compared Rosenberg to the Baal Shem Jewish mystics of the 1700s.

== Bibliography ==
Books

- Alexander, William DeWitt (1896). History of later years of the Hawaiian Monarchy and the revolution of 1893. Hawaiian Gazette company. OCLC 2821832.
- Forbes, David W. (2003). Hawaiian National Bibliography, 1780–1900. Vol. 4. University of Hawaii Press. ISBN 978-0-8248-2636-9.
- Mulholland, John Field (1970). Hawaii's religions. C. E. Tuttle. ISBN 978-0-8048-0710-4.
- Nodel, Julius (1996). David Max Eichhorn (ed.). Jewish folklore in America. Jonathan David Publishers. ISBN 978-0-8246-0384-7.
- Postal, Bernard; Koppman, Lionel (1986). American Jewish landmarks: a travel guide and history. Vol. 4. Fleet Press. ISBN 978-0-8303-0164-5.
- Thurston, Lorrin Andrews (1936). Memoirs of the Hawaiian revolution. Advertiser Publishing company. OCLC 4823270.

Journals

- Adler, Jacob (1970). "Elias Abraham Rosenberg, King Kalakaua's Soothsayer" (PDF). The Hawaiian Journal of History. 4: 53–8.
- Kramer, William M.; Stern, Norton B. (Winter 1974). "San Francisco's Fighting Jew". California Historical Quarterly. 53 (4): 333–46. doi:10.2307/25157526. JSTOR 25157526.

Magazines

- Postal, Bernard (1967). "The Jews in Hawaii: Early History is Linked with Royalty". Honolulu. pp. 8–18.
- Keany, Michael (April 2008). "Rogues, Rascals and Villains". Honolulu. Archived from the original on June 5, 2010.

Newspapers

- "The City". Daily Alta California. January 5, 1884.
- "Royal Presents". The Daily Bulletin. June 3, 1887.
- "Wants to be Cremated". Daily Alta California. July 17, 1887.
- "Telegraphic Brevities: San Francisco and Vicinity". Sacramento Daily Record-Union. July 18, 1887.
- "King Kalakaua led a Dual Life". The Chicago Tribune. Originally published in the San Francisco Examiner. February 15, 1891.
- Rubenstein, Harry (April 15, 1938). "Tale of a Torah in Hawaii". The Canadian Jewish Chronicle.
- Slomovitz, Philip (April 23, 1965). "The Jewish Community of Hawaii". The Canadian Jewish Chronicle.
- Turkienicz, Anna (September 9, 1999). "Hawaii's Jewish presence: Life and faith amid sun, sea". Canadian Jewish News. pp. 42–3.
- Kramer, Lauren (August 11, 2011). "Sunshine and Judaism on Oahu" (PDF). Canadian Jewish News. Archived from the original (PDF) on January 4, 2012.
