= Mirta Rosenberg =

Argentine poet and translator (1951–2019)

- Born: 7 October 1951 Rosario, Santa Fe, Argentina
- Died: June 28, 2019 (aged 67) Buenos Aires, Argentina

Mirta Rosenberg (October 7, 1951 – June 28, 2019) was an Argentine poet and translator.

== Biography ==
Rosenberg was born on October 7, 1951, in Rosario, Santa Fe. She studied Literature at the National University of Littoral and French at the Alliance Française school. Between 1973 and 1976, she studied Literature Translation and Scientific and Technical Translation in English at Instituto Superior Nacional del Profesorado de Rosario. She was a member of the board of directors of “Diario de Poesía” (Journal of Poetry). In 1990 she established the imprint “Bajo la Luna” (Under the Moon). In her literary work are found books like “Pasajes” (Excerpts), El arte de perder (The art of losing) and El paisaje interior (The inner landscape). In 2004 she won the Konex Award as a translator. Some of her poems have been included in several anthologies and translated into English, French, Portuguese, German and Dutch. She died on June 28, 2019, in Buenos Aires.

== Professional activity ==
She had translated and published poems of Katherine Mansfield, William Blake, Walt Whitman, Emily Dickinson, Marianne Moore, James Laughlin, Seamus Heaney, Elizabeth Bishop, D. H. Lawrence, Louise Gluck, Anne Carson, Robert Hass, Anne Sexton, Joseph Brodsky, Ted Hughes, Robert Lowell, Kay Ryan, Sappho (from English), among other authors. She was an adviser in the House of Poetry “Evaristo Carriego” of the Buenos Aires City Council, where she coordinated the series “Los Traidores”, a platform about poetry translation, between 2001 and 2004.

In cooperative work with Daniel Samoilovich she edited a weekly poetry page in the magazine of “La Nación” newspaper. In 2016 she established the literary magazine “Extra/1. Lecturas para poetas” (Extra/1. Reading for poets), which she is running at the moment. This publication collects texts about poetry, translations, and interviews.

From 2018 until the end of April 2019, she held the chair of the Poetry Workshop II, which she created, at the National University of the Arts (UNA in Spanish).

== Bibliography ==
=== Poetry ===
- 1984 Pasajes
- 1988 Madam
- 1994 Teoría sentimental
- 1998 El arte de perder
- 2001 Poemas, Asociación de Escritores Extremeños, Badajoz, Spain.
- 2006 El árbol de palabras. Collected work (it contains non-published poems and translations)
- 2012 El paisaje interior
- 2015 El arte de perder y otros poemas (anthology). Valencia, Spain, Pre-Textos Publishing House.
- 2016 Cuaderno de oficio (translations of Safo, from English into Spanish)
- 2017 Bichos (Cooperative work with Ezequiel Zaidenwerg)
- 2018 El árbol de palabras. Collected work (contains El paisaje interior and Cuaderno de oficio)

=== Translations ===
- Marianne Moore, El reparador de agujas de campanario y otros poemas, Buenos Aires, Centro Editor de América Latina, 1998.
- William Shakespeare, Henry IV. (co-work with Daniel Samoilovich) Buenos Aires, Grupo Editorial Norma, 2000.
- Katherine Mansfield, Textos privados. Cartas, diarios, poemas. Buenos Aires, Perfil Libros, 2000.
- Cynthia Ozick, Virilidad. Buenos Aires, Bajo la luna, 2008.
- Anne Talvaz, Confesiones de una gioconda y otros poemas. Buenos Aires, Bajo la luna, 2008.
- Louise Glück, The Seven Ages. Valencia, España, Editorial Pre-Textos, 2011.
- Anne Carson, Eros the Bittersweet, Buenos Aires, Fiordo, 2015.
- Yaki Setton, Sergio Waisman, Interior Landscape, New York, Ugly Duckling Presse, 2023.

== Awards ==
- 2003 Guggenheim Fellowship on poetry.
- 2004 Konex Merit Diploma, for her trajectory in literary translation.
