= Mark Rosenberg =

Mark (or Marc) Rosenberg is the name of:

- Marc Rosenberg (cricketer) (born 1982), South African cricketer
- Marc Rosenberg (judge) (1950–2015), Canadian judge
- Mark Rosenberg (producer) (1948–1992), film producer
- Marc Rosenberg (screenwriter) (fl. 1980s–2010s), American screenwriter and producer
- Mark B. Rosenberg (born 1949), academic
- Mark Brennan Rosenberg (fl. 2000s–2010s), author and comedian
- Mark Elijah Rosenberg, filmmaker and founder of the Rooftop Film Festival
- Mark L. Rosenberg (born 1950), gun violence researcher

== See also ==
- Markus Rosenberg (born 1982)
