= Emil Rosenberg =

Estonian biologist (1842–1925)

Emil Rosenberg (1842–1925) was a biologist and professor of comparative anatomy, embryology and histology, who worked 20 years at the Imperial University of Dorpat.

Rosenberg attended college as a student of Carl Gegenbaur at the University of Jena. From 1868–1875, he was the second prosector at the Imperial University of Dorpat, and in 1876, he was appointed as a professor of comparative anatomy, embryology and histology. Emil Rosenberg, working as professor, from 1876 to 1888, systematized the comparative-anatomy collections of the University of Dorpat in accordance with the system developed at the Hunterian Museum in London.

Emil Rosenberg also worked as a Professor of Anatomy in Utrecht.
