= Rotenburg =

Rotenburg may refer to:

- Rotenburg (district), Lower Saxony, Germany
- Rotenburg an der Wümme, capital of the district
- Rotenburg an der Fulda, near Kassel in Hesse
- Hersfeld-Rotenburg, a district in Hesse, Germany

== See also ==
- Rotenberg (disambiguation)
- Rothenberg (disambiguation)
- Rothenburg (disambiguation)
- Rothenberg, Hesse, Germany
- Rottenburg (disambiguation)
