= Paul Rosenberg =

Paul Rosenberg is the name of:

- Paul Rosenberg (art dealer) (1881–1959), French art dealer
- Paul Rosenberg (manager) (born 1971), manager of Eminem and head of Shady Records

== See also ==
- H. Paul Rosenberg (1924–1990), American sports team owner
