= Robert Rosenberg (writer) =

American-Israeli author

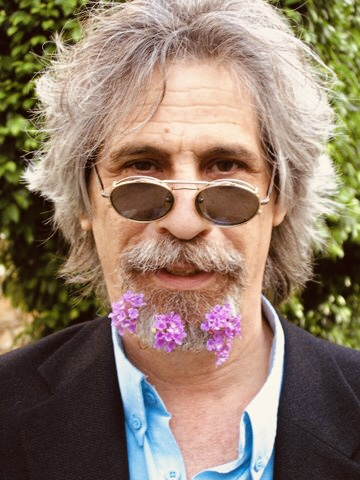
- Born: 1951; Boston, United States
- Died: October 24 2006; Tel Aviv, Israel
- Occupations: Writer, journalist, poet and internet pioneer.
- Spouse: Silvia Rosenberg

Robert Rosenberg (1951 in Boston – October 24, 2006 in Tel Aviv) was a writer, journalist, poet and internet pioneer. He spent most of his adult life in Tel Aviv. He was married to painter Silvia Rosenberg, who also died of cancer shortly after his death.

The author of several crime novels, Rosenberg also collaborated with Moshe "Muki" Betzer in writing Secret Soldier. The autobiography of Israel's Greatest Commando.

== Bibliography ==
=== Own work ===
- The Cutting Room: An Avram Cohen Mystery. Simon & Schuster. 1993. ISBN 978-0-671-74344-4.
- House of Guilt. Charles Scribner's Sons. 1996. ISBN 978-0-684-82654-7.
- Crimes of the City. Poisoned Pen Press. 2001. ISBN 978-1-890208-81-3.
- An Accidental Murder: An Avram Cohen Mystery. Charles Scribner's Sons. 2002. ISBN 978-0-7432-4416-9.

=== As a co-author ===
- Betser, Moshe; Robert Rosenberg (1996). Secret Soldier. The autobiography of Israel's Greatest Commando. Simon & Schuster. ISBN 978-0-684-81683-8.
