= Robert A. Rosenberg =

United States Air Force general

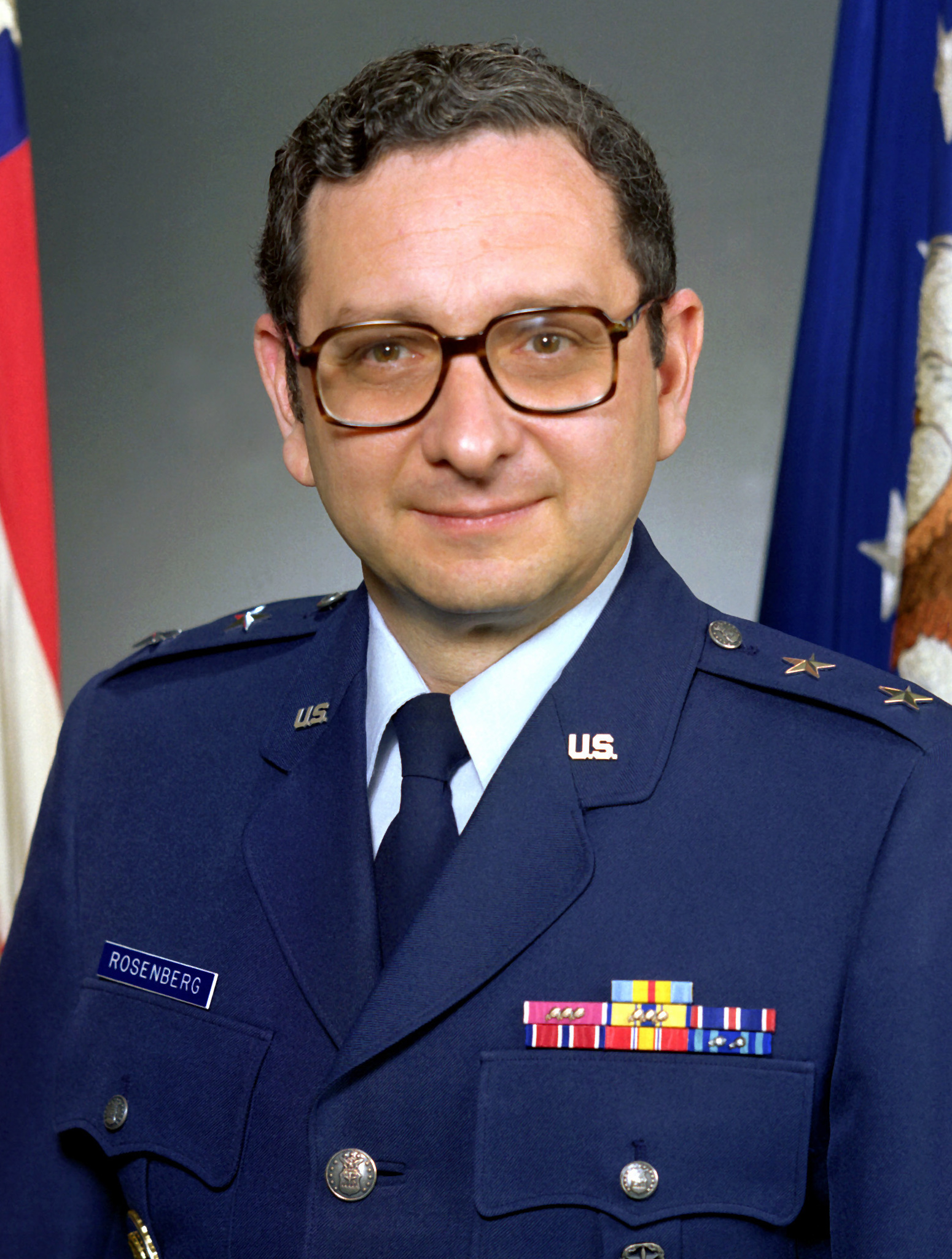
- Official portrait of Major General Rosenberg
- Born: November 16, 1934 (age 91); Kansas City, Missouri, U.S.
- Allegiance: United States of America
- Branch: United States Air Force
- Service years: 1957-1987
- Rank: Major General

Major General Robert Alan "Rosie" Rosenberg (born November 16, 1934) of United States Air Force was Director of Defense Mapping Agency from July 1985 to September 1987. Throughout his 30-year career with the U.S. Air Force, he was instrumental to the U.S. satellite program. National Geospatial-Intelligence Agency inducted him into its Hall of Fame in 2005.

== Early life, and education ==
Rosenberg was born in 1934, in Kansas City, of Missouri state. Raised in Leavenworth, Kansas, he graduated from Leavenworth High School in 1953 and entered the United States Naval Academy, where he received a bachelor's degree in general engineering in 1957. He was commissioned a second lieutenant in the U.S. Air Force following graduation. In 1964 he earned a master's degree in aerospace engineering at the Air Force Institute of Technology, Wright-Patterson Air Force Base, Ohio; and graduated from the Industrial College of the Armed Forces, Washington D.C., in 1972.

== Career ==
Major General Rosenberg was assigned in April 1958 to Forbes AFB, Kansas, as a flight line maintenance officer with the Strategic Air Command's 90th Strategic Reconnaissance Wing. His next assignments were at Vandenberg AFB, California, with the Air Force Ballistic Missile Division, and with the Office of Special Projects, Office of the Secretary of the Air Force, in a variety of positions.

In 1972 he joined the Air Staff and served as division chief under the assistant for research, development, and acquisition programming, Office of the Deputy Chief of Staff, Research and Development, before joining the Office of Space Systems, Office of the Secretary of the Air Force, where he served successively as deputy director for programs, principal deputy, and acting director.

After an assignment to the National Security Council, the White House, in March 1980, he returned to Headquarters U.S. Air Force as assistant chief of staff for studies and analyses. His next assignments were as assistant vice commander of the U.S. Air Force Space Command and vice commander in chief for the North American Aerospace Defense Command, with consolidated headquarters at Peterson AFB, Colorado.

He participated in the initial development, test and launch of Atlas-Agena expendable launch system with the Air Force Ballistic Missile Division and served for years as targeteer for the GAMBIT reconnaissance satellite program. He served with the Office of Special Projects, Office of the Secretary of the Air Force, where he was responsible for developing and acquiring the mission planning and command and control software for the HEXAGON satellite program.

== Defense Mapping Agency ==
As the director of Defense Mapping Agency (DMA) from July 1985 to September 1987; Major General Rosenberg provided new leadership in establishing a cohesive interface to the national intelligence program and positioned the DMA as a critical contributor to the success of the warfare capability of the nation. He guided the Phase II developments of the DMA modernization program to ensure proper adjustments to the changing Department of Defense geographic requirements, as well as making critical reviews of the programs progress and design.

Major General Rosenberg retired on October 1, 1987.

== Awards, and decorations ==
Major General Rosenberg was inducted into National Geospatial-Intelligence Agency's Hall of Fame in 2005. In 2017, he was awarded the United States Geospatial Intelligence Foundation (USGIF) Lifetime Award and was the 13th person to receive the award. He wore the master space and master missile badges. He wore the master space and master missile badges. His military decorations and awards include:

- Defense Distinguished Service Medal
- Legion of Merit with four oak leaf clusters
- Air Force Commendation Medal with four oak leaf clusters
- Air Force Outstanding Unit Award Ribbon
