= Rose Rosenberg =

British political secretary (1892–1966)

Rose Rosenberg CBE
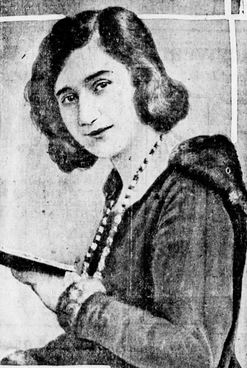
- 1929
- Born: 1 September 1892; Spitalfields, London, England
- Died: 13 April 1966 (aged 73); London, England
- Other names: Rose Hoenig
- Occupation: administrator
- Years active: 1919–1950s

Rose Rosenberg, CBE (1 September 1892 – 13 April 1966) was a Jewish English woman who served as the private secretary for statesman Ramsay MacDonald from 1923 to 1935. Prior to her employment with MacDonald, she worked in the National Council for Civil Liberties with those opposed to conscription and was the personal assistant of suffragette, Margaret Mackworth, 2nd Viscountess Rhondda. She was known for her ability to keep secrets, monitoring those who wished to engage with MacDonald, and earned the nickname "Miss Rose of No. 10" from the international press. She was honored as a Commander of the Order of the British Empire in 1930. In later life, she worked for the British publicity office of Metro-Goldwyn-Mayer and in various positions during World War II providing assistance.

== Early life ==
Rose Rosenberg was born on 1 September 1892 in Spitalfields, a parish of London, England to Rachel (née Rosenthal) and Isaac Rosenberg. Both of her parents were born in Russia and were naturalized citizens of Britain. At a young age, she began studying piano and wanted to become a professional musician. Completing her elementary schooling, she enrolled at a commercial college and took university extension classes, learning shorthand and typing. Family circumstances forced her to leave her studies at the age of fourteen. Rosenberg joined the Women's Social and Political Union while still a teenager, working for women's suffrage and during World War I became a pacifist, assisting conscientious objectors with her knowledge of the various military acts. She had been hired as an assistant to the director of the National Council for Civil Liberties and when he left for health reasons, she took over the post. Simultaneously, at age seventeen, she became editor of a mining magazine and joined the Fabian Society. The following year, she became the private secretary of Lady Rhondda.

== Career ==
In 1919, she joined the general staff of the Parliamentary Labour Party and in 1923 was hired by Ramsay MacDonald, the Labour Party leader, as his private secretary. When MacDonald became Prime Minister (PM) she earned the nickname in the press as "Miss Rose of No. 10", after 10 Downing Street, headquarters of the Government of the United Kingdom. She remained at her post when he resigned the premiership in 1925 and became the leader of the opposition. From 1929 through MacDonald's second posting as PM, which ended in 1935, Rosenberg was the conduit for information between him and both the press and the House of Commons.

Rosenberg maintained the correspondence of MacDonald, keeping the only other key to his confidential papers. She and his daughter Ishbel MacDonald became friends and together they tried to shield him from the pressures of office. In 1928, she became the first woman admitted to the House of Commons' Strangers' Dining Room and the following year accompanied MacDonald on a visit to the United States, the first time a sitting British PM had come to the US. She was honored as a Commander of the Order of the British Empire in 1930. She served him until 1937 and left in June to serve as an executive at the British branch of Metro-Goldwyn-Mayer in charge of their publicity.

On 2 October 1939, Rosenberg married Laszlo Hoenig, a Hungarian architect and interior designer, in Chelsea, London Her husband opened a furniture showroom of his modernist designs in Mayfair. During World War II, she worked with Lady Reading at the Women's Voluntary Service for Civil Defence. She also worked on the Committee of Friends of the Hebrew University and performed work with refugees. She and Hoenig divorced in 1954 and she returned as a legal advisor to the National Council for Civil Liberties.

== Death and legacy ==
Hoenig died on 13 April 1966, in London. She was remembered as the "power behind Ramsay MacDonald's throne" for her ability to maintain discretion and to navigate and manage communications conduits to and from the Prime Minister. Though in later life she would give interviews about office procedures during her tenure with MacDonald, she refused to publish a memoir or divulge information on the personalities or business to which she was privy.
