= Otto Rosenberg =

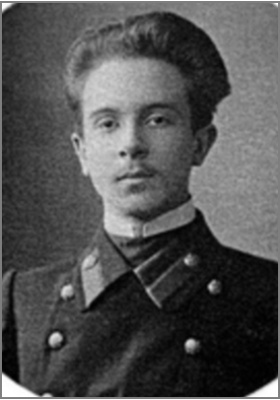
Rosenberg in 1917

Otto Karl Julius Rosenberg (Russian: Оттон Оттонович Розенберг; 19 July [O.S. 7 July] 1888 Friedrichstadt (now Jaunjelgava, Latvia) – November 26, 1919) was a Russian scholar who created a system of organizing Chinese characters in a dictionary format, which eventually resulted in the Four Corner Method.

In 1910 he graduated from St Petersburg University, where he studied a host of Oriental languages (Chinese, Japanese, Tibetan, Sanskrit and Mongolian). Fyodor Shcherbatskoy, his teacher in Indian philosophy, raised his interest in Buddhism. In the course of Rosenberg's research stay in Japan from 1912 till 1917 he became one of the first Western researchers of the Zen school of Buddhism.

He facilitated contact with Chinese culture and institutions.
