= Joel Rosenberg =

Joel Rosenberg may refer to:

- Joel Rosenberg (science fiction author) (1954–2011), Canadian American science fiction and fantasy author
- Joel C. Rosenberg (born 1967), American political pundit, and author of The Last Jihad Series
