= David Rosenberg (curator) =

French art curator and author

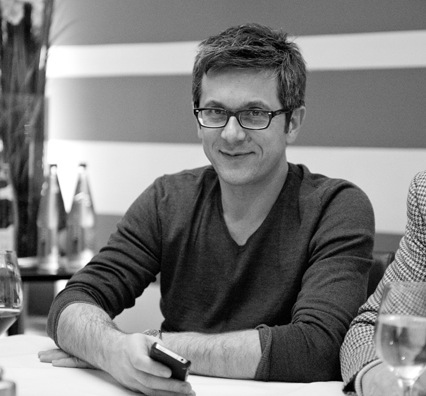
- Born: 3 November 1965 (age 60)
- Occupations: Author and art curator

David Rosenberg (born 3 November 1965) is a French art curator and author, specialized in modern and contemporary art styles.

== Biography ==
David Rosenberg has curated exhibitions and organized art events in France and internationally in collaboration with museums and foundations.

In his works, he has explored relations between art and different disciplines — such as science, new technologies, dance, and studied connections between art and comic strip or manga. He has also done work around the history of photography and the record of invention (neon light).

In 2003, he founded "Le Dancing", a group of European dancers and choreographers performing offstage, in collaboration with plastic artists and artistic groups.

In 2004, he contributed to "The Quiet in the Land, Art, Spirituality and Everyday life", Luang Prabang, Laos, created and directed by France Morin.

From 2004 to 2012, he was a faculty member in the Art department at the University of Paris VIII.

In 2014 he was named Knight of the Order of the Arts and Letters.

== Exhibitions and events (selection) ==
- Gold Water: Apocalyptic Black Mirrors II, MACRO Museum, Rome, in collaboration with Paolo De Grandis et Claudio Crescentini. March/April 2016. Artist: Maria Veronica Leon V.
- Mattotti / Infini. Fonds Hélène & Édouard Leclerc pour la Culture (Hélène & Edouard Leclerc foundation for the Culture), Capucins, Landerneau, in collaboration with Lucas Hureau. December, 2015.
- Hard Rain. Feizi Gallery, Brussels. November, 2015.
- Showcase #1: Think Big as part of Parcours Privé FIAC 2015, Beaugrenelle, Paris, in collaboration with Constance Breton (The Art of this Century). October, 2015.
- Dédicaces et déclarations (Dedications and declarations). Exhibition at Cognacq-Jay Museum as part of the #05 Yia Art Fair Hors les Murs, in collaboration with Marie Gayet. October, 2015.
- Mille fleurs ! (A thousand flowers!). A Chinese art collection. Sainte-Anne chapel, La Baule. July, 2015.
- Inside Tesla. Feizi Gallery, Brussels. April, 2015.
- Silent Conversation. Feizi Gallery, Brussels. March, 2015.
- Screens. Feizi Gallery, Brussels. September, 2015.
- Obscur — Clarté (Obscur — clarity). As part of the #02 YIA Art Fair, Bastille Design Center, Paris. March, 2015.
- Metamorphosis of the Virtual 5+5. K11 Shanghai, Shanghai. July, 2014.
- Genesis (Hyundai showroom). Beyond Museum, Seoul, Korea. December, 2014.
- Holistic, Mario Mazzoli Gallery, Berlin. May 2014. Artist: Donato Piccolo.
- Endre Rozsda : le temps retrouvé (Endre Rozsda: time regained). Retrospective exhibition of the centenary of the birth of the artist. In collaboration with Rona Kopeczky and Péter Baki. Magyar Nemzeti Galéria (Hungarian National Gallery), Budapest. November, 2013.
- Je sème à tout vent… 11 galeries parisiennes en fleur (I sow to the four winds...11 flowering Parisian galleries). May, 2013.
- Turbulences II. Boghossian Foundation, in partnership with the Louis Vuitton cultural space, Brussels, February, 2013, in collaboration with Pierre Sterckx.
- Éric Michel, Aura. Hôtel-Dieu, Brie-Comte-Robert. December, 2012.
- Neon, la materia luminosa dell’arte MACRO Museum, Rome, in collaboration with Bartolomeo Pietromarchi. June, 2012.
- Turbulences. Louis Vuitton cultural space, Paris, in collaboration with Pierre Sterckx. June, 2012.
- Néon ! Who’s afraid of red, yellow and blue ?. La Maison Rouge, Antoine de Galbert foundation. February, 2012.
- L’Étrange Noël de Monsieur et Madame de la Châtre(The Nightmare Before Christmas of Mr and Mrs de la Châtre). Martine et Thibault de la Châtre Gallery, Paris. December, 2011.
- Charwei Tsai, « My Nature ». Maison Deyrolle, Paris. May, 2011.
- Fabien Verschaere, Lost & Found Galerie RX, Paris. April, 2011.
- Contemplation/Contestation, a Chinese art collection. Neuflize OBC Bank, Paris. October, 2010.
- Mantras, moqueries, monstres et mutations (Youpi, c’est la rentrée ! chapter II) (Mantras, mockeries, monsters and mutations). Martine et Thibault de la Châtre Gallery, Paris. September, 2010.
- Deichû Ni Hasu (a Lotus in the Mud), Underground & Secret Mangaka. Georges-Philippe et Nathalie Vallois Gallery, Paris. April, 2010.
- Show, Vlad et Alina Turco, École des Beaux-Arts de Paris, Paris. January, 2010.
- La photographie n’est pas l’art, collection Sylvio Perlstein (Photography is not art, Sylvio Perlstein collection)
  Museum of Ixelles, Brussels. October, 2009 / Museum of Modern and Contemporary Art of Strasbourg, Strasbourg, in collaboration with Régis Durand. February, 2010.
- Sam Samore, Schizophrenic Portrait, 1973-2009, a survey. Anne de Villepoix Gallery, Paris. September, 2009.
- Youpi, c’est la rentrée ! Martine et Thibault de la Châtre Gallery, Paris. September, 2009.
- Vraoum ! bande-dessinée et art contemporain (Vraoum ! Comic strip and contemporary art). La Maison Rouge, Antoine de Galbert foundation, in collaboration with Pierre Sterckx. May, 2009.
- Jean-Marc Bustamante, Pedigree; Filomena Soares Gallery, Lisbon. January, 2009.
- Curating Contest, 16 curators, 16 propositions. La Louisiane hotel. Olivier Robert Gallery, Paris. December, 2007. Artists: Vlad & Alina Turco.
- Zan Jbai, Nothing happened / Nothing to tell you. Kamel Mennour Gallery, Paris. June, 2007.
- An Xiaotong, Absolute Images. Espace Saint-Honoré, Paris. February, 2007
- Busy going crazy, Sylvio Perlstein collection, art and photography from Dada to nowadays. La Maison Rouge, Antoine de Galbert foundation, Paris. October, 2006.
- Paper, Wallpaper, Plants & Venilia. Quang Gallery, Paris. January, 2005.
- Camila Oliveira Fairclough, Marie-Gabrielle Lou, Sylvain Rousseau & Olivier Babin. Heartgalerie, Paris. July, 2004.
- L’expérience intérieure (Inner experience) (dance, poetry, installations, photography). Heartgalerie, Paris. June, 2004.
- Chen Zhen, “Silence sonore” (Chen Zhen, "Audible silence"). Performance and musical interpretation of “Jue Chang — Dancing Body / Drumming Mind (The Last Song)”. Palais de Tokyo, contemporary creation site, Paris. October, 2003.
- Le dancing III. Choreographic performance for the 30th anniversary of FIAC, Maxim's, Paris. October, 2003.
- Le Dancing II. Choreographic performance as part of the presentation of the contemporary photography collection of NSMD – ABN AMRO – Centre national de la photographie (National Photography Center), Paris. July, 2003.
- Le Dancing (choreographers and plastic artists), Michel Rein Gallery, Paris. May, 2003.
- Prière(s) (Prayers), co-curator and co-author of the catalogue, in collaboration with Pascal Bonafoux, Musée d’art et d’histoire de Saint-Denis (Museum of Art and History of Saint-Denis), Saint-Denis. March, 2002. Endre Rozsda, l’œuvre graphique, rétrospective (Endre Rozda, graphic work, retrospective). co-curator of the exhibition, editor of Budapest National Gallery, Budapest. June, 2001.
- Endre Rozsda, l’œuvre peint, rétrospective (Endre Rozda, painted work, retrospective). co-curator of the exhibition, editor of Mucsarnok Palace, Budapest. May, 1998.

== Publications (selection) ==
- Umberto Mariani, Skira, Milano, to be published, 2016.
- Mattotti / Infini, FHEL, Landerneau, 2015 (ISBN 9782954615554)
- Metamorphosis of the virtual, K11, Shanghai, 2014
- Endre Rozsda : Le temps retrouvé (with Rona Kopeczky and Peter Baki), MNG Budapest, 2013 (catalogue)
- Turbulences II, (with Pierre Sterckx), Fondation Boghossian, Brussels, 2013 (catalogue)
- Les Nouveaux horizons de l’architecture, Assouline, Paris, 2013 (ISBN 9782759406081)
- Turbulences (with Pierre Sterckx), Espace culturel Louis Vuitton, Paris, 2012 (catalogue)
- Neon, la materia luminosa dell’arte, Quodlibet, Rome, 2012 (catalogue) (ISBN 9788874624461)
- Néon, Archibooks / la maison rouge, Paris, 2012 (catalogue) (ISBN 9782357331808)
- Les Nouveaux horizons du design, Assouline, Paris, 2012
- Yang Yongliang, Thircuir, Beijing, 2011 (ISBN 9881992443)
- Pascal Haudressy, Skira, Milano, 2011 (ISBN 9788857210414)
- Les Nouveaux horizons de l’art, Assouline, Paris, 2011
- Kata Legrady, Bombs and Candies, Skira, Milano, 2011 (ISBN 9788857208602)
- Contemplation / Contestation, Une collection d’art contemporain chinois, Trocadéro, Paris, 2010 (catalogue)
- Art Game Book, Histoire des Arts du 20e siècle, Assouline, Paris, 2010 (ISBN 9782759405718)
- La Photographie n’est pas l’art, Collection Sylvio Perlstein (with Régis Durand), Musée d’Ixelles and Musées de Strasbourg, 2009 (catalogue)
- Jean-Marc Bustamante, Pedigree, Filomena Soares Gallery, Lisbon, 2009 (catalogue)
- Vraoum ! Bande-dessinée & art contemporain (with Pierre Sterckx), Fage & La maison rouge, Paris, 2009 (catalogue)
- Collection Sylvio Perlstein, Ludion, Gand, 2006
- Busy going crazy, collection Sylvio Perlstein, Fage et La maison rouge, Paris 2006 (catalogue)
- Christofle, Assouline, Paris, 2005 (ISBN 9782843236563)
- Louvre Game Book, Assouline, Paris, 2005 (ISBN 2843237327)
- Wake Up, Damien Dufresne, Assouline, Paris, 2004 (ISBN 2843235847)
- Chen Zhen, Invocation of Washing Fire, éd. Gli Ori, Siena-Prato, Italy, 2003. Directed by David Rosenberg and Xu Min (ISBN 9788873360780)
- Art Game Book, Histoire des Arts du XXème siècle, Assouline, Paris, 2003 (ISBN 9782843235313)
- Manoli, l’élan, la rencontre, monographie, Somogy, Paris, 2003 (ISBN 2850566098)
- Rozsda, l’œil en fête, Somogy, Paris, 2002. Directed by David Rosenberg. Texts by: Sarane Alexandrian, Dominique Desanti, Péter Esterhazy, Françoise Gilot, Édouard Jaguer, Érik Orsenna, André Breton and Joyce Mansour. (ISBN 9782850565717)
- Endre Rozsda, l’œuvre graphique, Budapest National Gallery, 2001. Directed by David Rosenberg. Texts by : Sarane Alexandrian, Péter Esterhazy, François Fejtö, Françoise Gilot and Gabor Pataki (catalogue in French/Hungarian).
- Endre Rozsda, Mucsarnok, Budapest, 1998. Directed by David Rosenberg. Texts by: Érik Orsenna, Dr. Krisztina Passuth, interview with Endre Rozsda by David Rosenberg (catalogue in French/Hungarian).

=== Contributions and collective works ===
- Boris Lurie, Ed. Galerie Odile Ouizemann & Boris Lurie art Fondation, Paris, 2016
- Thinking Outside the Box / Andrei Proletski, Ed. Museum Haus Konstruktiv, Zurich, 2016
- Nicolas de Crécy, MEL Publisher, Paris, 2016
- Kata Legrady: Once upon a time..., Skira, Milano, 2014 (ISBN 9788857219646)
- André Brasilier, Skira, Milano, 2014 (ISBN 9788857223964)
- Miguel Chevalier, Power Pixels, CDA Enghien, Écritures Numériques, 2013
- Les Métamorphoses du Virtuel, Venice, 2013
- Kata Legrady, Mudima, Skira, Milano, 2013 (ISBN 9788857219653)
- Lorenzo Fernandez, Gal. Taménaga, Paris, 2012
- A History of Contemporary Chinese Photography, Gal. Paris-Beijing, Paris, 2012 (ISBN 9791090176157)
- Kata Legrady, Guns & Masks, Paris, 2011
- La Maison Rouge 2004–2009, Paris, 2010
- Philippe Pasqua, Paradise, Skira, Milano, 2010 (ISBN 9788857204666)
- Gao Brothers, Galerie Vallois, Paris, 2008
- Lu Feifei, Paris, 2008
- Elsa Sahal, Fondation Ricard, Particules, 2008
- Wang Du, Transréalité, Kestnergesellschaft, Hanover, 2007
- Snaked trip & co, vers la ligne rose, Sylvain Paris, La Cinquième Couche, Brussels, 2007
- Philippe Jusforgues, Galerie 1900–2000, Paris, 2006
- Destination Luang Prabang, Somogy, Paris, 2006 (ISBN 9782757200551)
- Eduardo Kac • Move 36, Filigranes Éditions, Paris, 2004 (edited by Elena Giuia Rosi, contributions and texts by: Elena Giuia Rosi, David Rosenberg, Frank Popper, Didier Ottinger, Linda Weintraub, Hugues Marchal) (ISBN 9782350460123)
- Prières, catalogue, Museum of Art and History of Saint-Denis and Somogy, Paris, 2002
