= Rosenegg =

Rosenegg may refer to:

- Rosenegg (mountain), a mountain of Baden-Württemberg, Germany
- Schloss Rosenegg, a schloss (castle) in Rosenegg, Fieberbrunn, Austria
