= Yale Rosenberg =

- Born: April 19, 1939; Houston, Texas
- Died: September 22, 2002 (aged 63)
- Spouse: Irene Merker Rosenberg

Academic background
- Education: Rice University; New York University School of Law

Academic work
- Institutions: University of Houston Law Center

Yale Leonard Rosenberg (April 19, 1939 – September 22, 2002) was an American legal scholar whose scholarship focused on Jewish law and habeas corpus, among other topics. He taught at the University of Houston Law Center, where he first joined the faculty in 1973, and where he was named the A.A. White Professor of Law in 1996. He was named Professor of the Year by the University of Houston Student Bar Association in 1998, and received the University of Houston Teaching Excellence Award in 2000. After Rosenberg's death in 2002, the University of Houston Law Center established the Yale L. Rosenberg Memorial Fund in his memory. The Fund is used both to recognize law students for exemplary legal writing and to encourage distinguished legal scholars to speak at the center.
