= Rodenberg (disambiguation) =

Rodenberg is a town in Lower Saxony, Germany. It is also a German surname.

Rodenberg may also refer to:

== Places ==
- Rodenberg (Samtgemeinde), a collective municipality in Lower Saxony, Germany

== People ==
- August Rodenberg (1873–1933), American tug of war athlete
- Carl-Heinz Rodenberg (1904–1995), German neurologist and psychiatrist, member of Nazi euthanasia program
- Ilse Rodenberg (1906–2006), East German actress, theatre director, and politician
- John Rodenberg (born 1956), American jurist from Minnesota
- Julius Rodenberg (1831–1914), German Jewish poet and author
- Michael Rodenberg (born 1970), German keyboardist
- Theodore Rodenberg (died 1644), Dutch diplomat and playwright
- William A. Rodenberg (1865–1937), American politician from Illinois

== See also ==
- Rosenberg (disambiguation)
