= Ellen Rothenberg (writer) =

American visual artist and writer

- Born: 1949
- Education: BFA Cornell University, 1971; MFA Massachusetts College of Art, 1979
- Style: Performance, Installation, Fiber Art and Material Studies
- Awards: National Endowment for the Arts; Illinois Council on the Arts
- Website: www.ellenrothenberg.com

Ellen Rothenberg (born 1949) is an American visual artist and writer whose socio-political art manifests itself in performance, installation, objects, and visual essays.

The content of her art addresses the politics of everyday life and how communities engage through collaborative practices.

== Performances ==
Informed by the anti-war, civic protests, and feminist movements of the 1960s, Rothenberg has brought her performances and installations into the public sphere and outside of traditional gallery and museum venues. Often concerned with labor issues and intrusive government policies that limit individual mobility and rights, her performances since the 1980s have incorporated research to highlight the connections between historical events and contemporary issues of displacement and human rights.

== Exhibitions ==
Rothenberg has exhibited her work in the Feast of Astonishments: Charlotte Moorman and the Avant Garde, the show traveled to Museum der Moderne Salzburg, Grey Art Gallery NYU, Mary and Leigh Block Museum of Art (2016–17). In 2015, she had a solo exhibition, elsetime at Sector 2337, Chicago. In 2008-2011 her work was included in the Experimental Geography exhibition at the Richard E. Peeler Art Center DePauw University, the show traveled to Rochester Art Center, Albuquerque Museum, and Museum of London. Her work was also included in Hide and Seek, Museum of Contemporary Art Chicago (2010); Unraveling Tradition, 516 Arts Albuquerque (2010); Mapping the Self, Museum of Contemporary Art Chicago (2008); Consuming War, Hyde Park Art Center (2007); After Images: Art and Social Memory, Neues Museum Weserburg (2004); Telling Histories, Boston University Art Gallery (1999); After Auschwitz, Royal Festival Hall London, Manchester City Art Gallery (1995). In 1994 she had a solo show, Partial Index and a Probability..., at the Portland Museum of Art Maine.

== Collections ==
Rothenberg's work is included in the collections of the Boston Museum of Fine Arts and the Rose Art Museum, Brandeis University.

== Awards, honors ==
Rothenberg has received grants, fellowship and awards for her work, including three fellowships from the Illinois Arts Council, three fellowships from the National Endowment for the Arts, a Bunting Institute Fellowship from Radcliffe College, and grants from CEC Artslink, LEF Foundation, and the Propeller Fund.
