= Rottenberg =

Rottenberg is a surname. Notable people with the surname include:

- Anda Rottenberg (born 1944), Polish art historian, art critic and writer
- Dan Rottenberg (born 1942), American writer, editor and journalist
- Dorian Rottenberg, translator
- Ena Rottenberg, (1893–1952), Hungarian-Austrian craftswoman, draftswoman and ceramist
- Enrique Rottenberg (born 1948), Israeli artist
- Felix Rottenberg (born 1957), Dutch politician
- Linda Rottenberg, American businesswoman and writer
- Ludwig Rottenberg (1865–1932), Austrian-German composer and conductor
- Mika Rottenberg (born 1976), Israeli artist
- Silke Rottenberg (born 1972), German women's footballer
