= Rottenburg =

Rottenburg may refer to:

- Rottenburg am Neckar, Baden-Württemberg, Germany
- Rottenburg an der Laaber, Bavaria, Germany
- Francis de Rottenburg (1757–1832), Polish-born soldier and administrator

== See also ==
- Rotenberg (disambiguation)
- Rotenburg (disambiguation)
- Rothenberg, Hesse, Germany
- Rothenburg (disambiguation)
- Rottenburgh family
