= Aleksandr Rosenberg =

Russian architect (1877–1935)

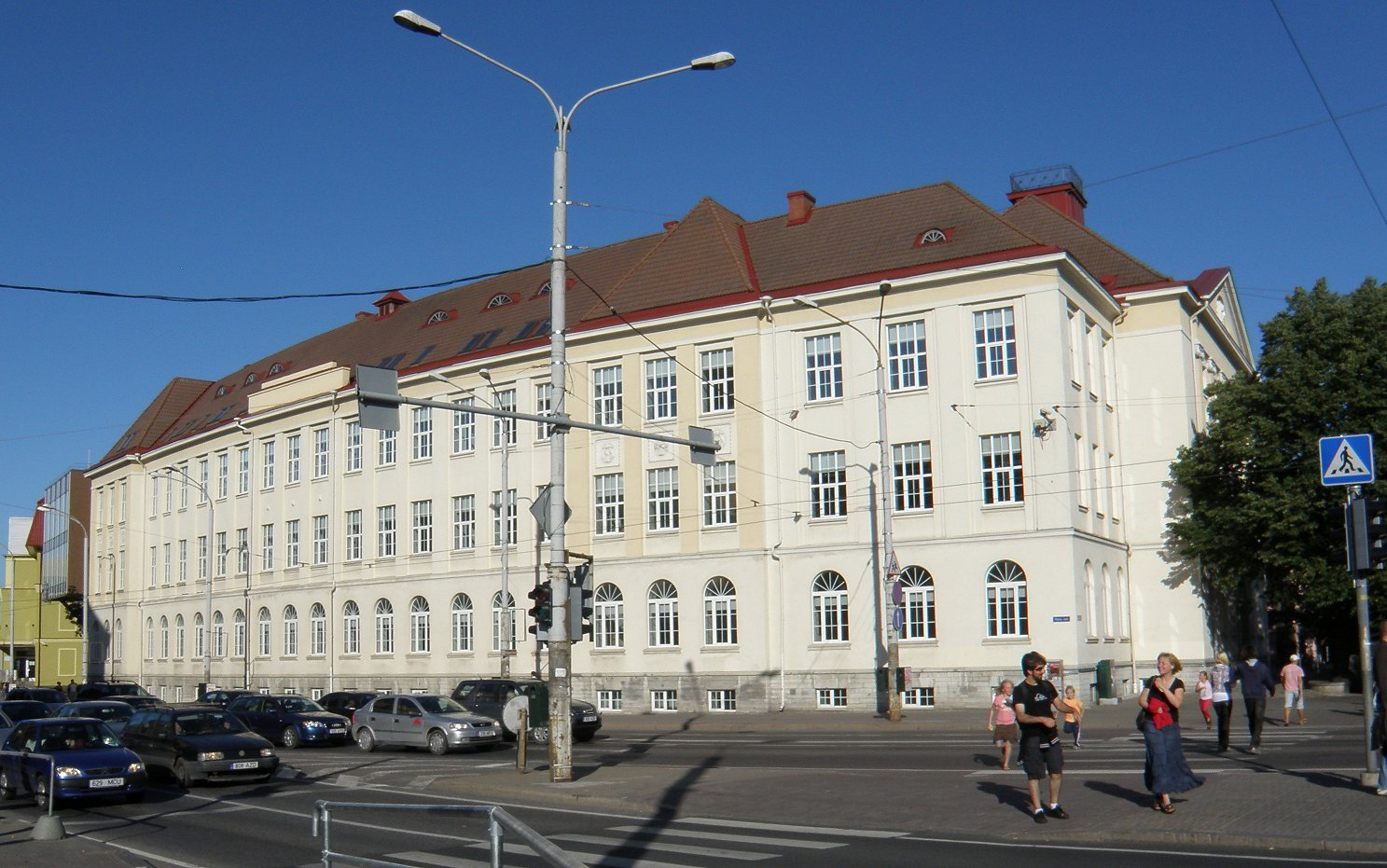
Former Tallinn seafaring school, now Tallinn English College

Aleksandr Vladimirovich Rosenberg (Russian: Алекса́ндр Влади́мирович Розенберг; 1877–1935) was a Russian architect and author of books about architectural theory. He specialized on the planning of hospitals.

== Works ==
- 1907–1916 – Peter The Great Clinical Hospital, Saint Petersburg; with Lev Ilyin and Aleksandr Klein
- 1912–1916 – Tallinn seafaring school (currently Tallinn English College), Tallinn; with Erich Jacoby

== Books ==
- 1923 – Философия архитектуры (Philosophy of Architecture)
