= Yad =

Jewish ritual pointer

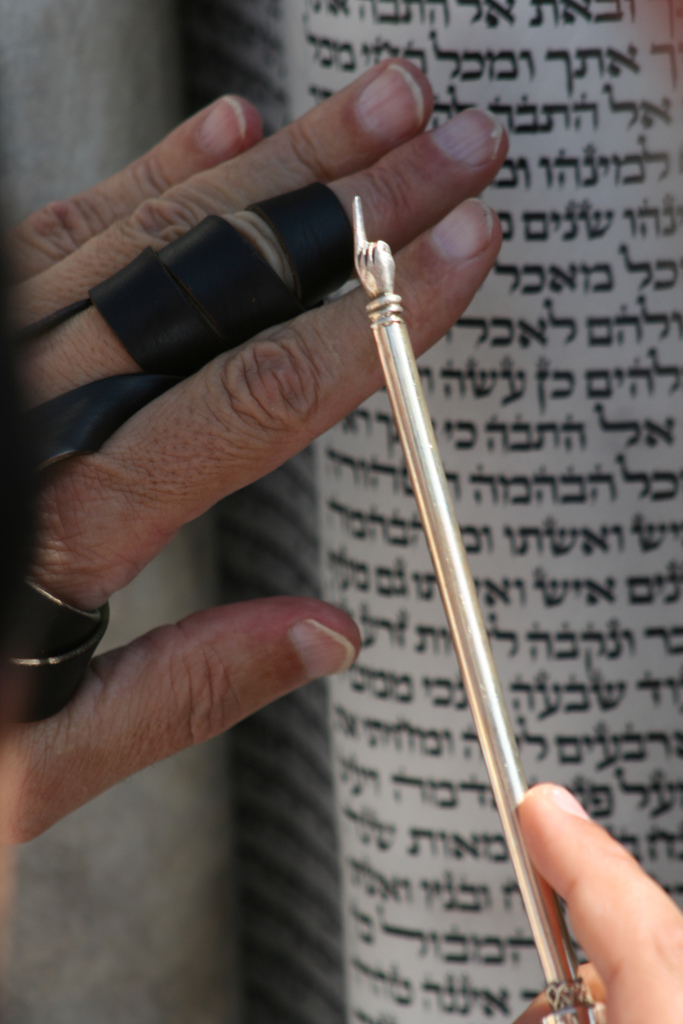
Pointing with a yad on an open Torah scroll

A yad (Hebrew: יד, romanized: yad; Yiddish: האַנט, romanized: hant, lit. 'hand'), or an etzba (Hebrew: אצבע, lit. 'finger'), is a Jewish ritual pointer, or stylus, popularly known as a Torah pointer, used by the reader to follow the text during the Torah reading from the parchment Torah scrolls. It is often shaped like a long rod, capped by a small hand with its index finger pointing from it.

== Rationale ==
Beyond its practical usage in pointing out letters, the yad ensures that the parchment is not touched during the reading. There are several suggested reasons for this, including the mistaken idea that the fragile parchment is easily damaged by skin oils. However, the reason provided by the Talmud and other aspects of Jewish tradition state that the original reason was related to ritual purity.

While not required when chanting from the Torah, a yad is used frequently and is considered a hidur mitzvah ("embellishment of the commandment") of reading the Torah.

== Manufacture ==
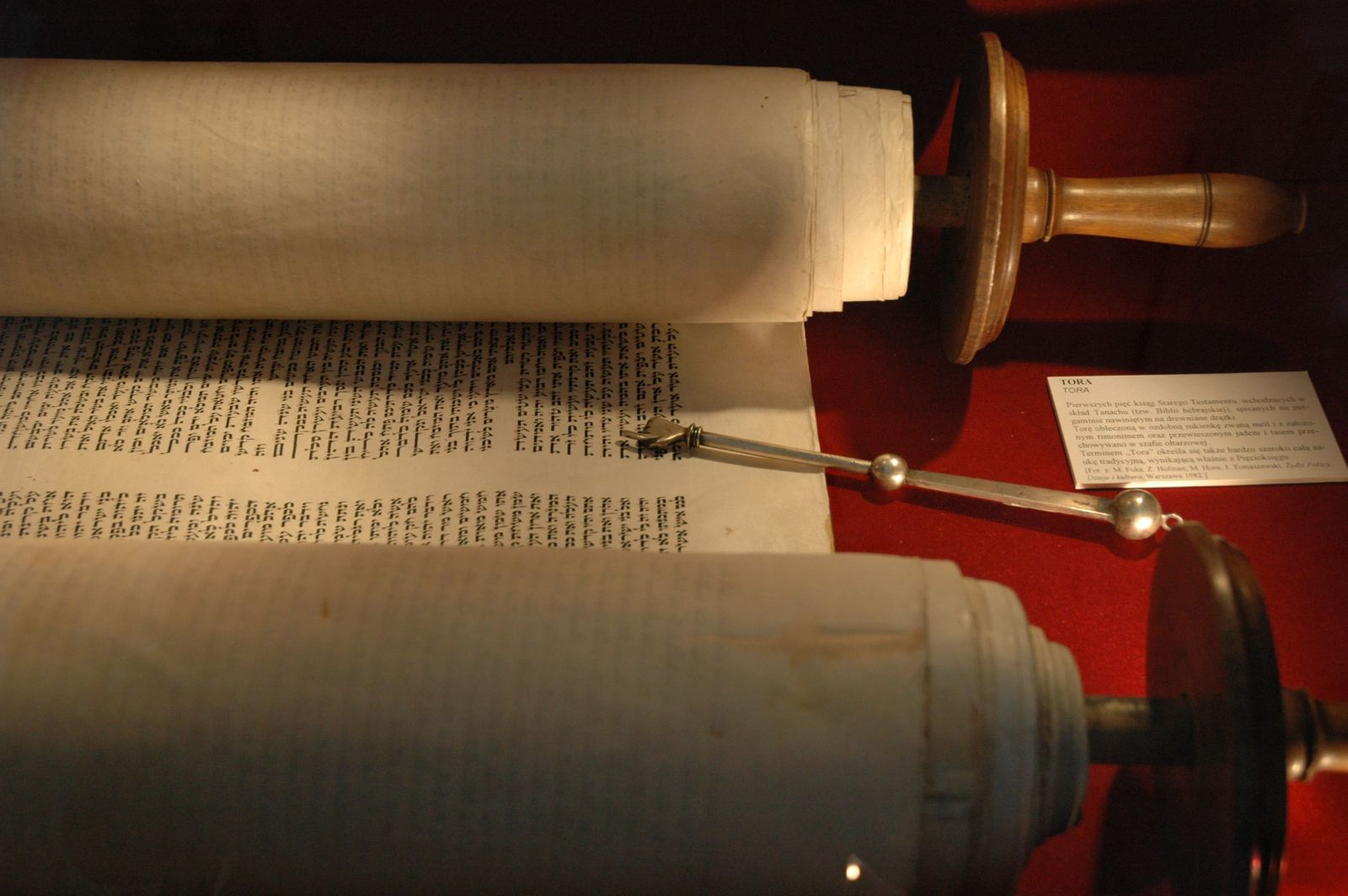
A yad resting on an open Torah scroll

A yad can be made of any number of materials, though silver is common, especially used in crowning the pommel of the yad.

== Mountain Jews ==
The Mountain Jews had a particular way of handling pointers: they were held in pairs forming a V-shape, to divide the text into passages. They were made and donated in pairs, even joined with a chain when they had inscriptions related to the same event. Their shapes were of two types: a flat bar and a bar twisted into a long, tight, screw-like shape with a flat part. In both types, the point is in the shape of a flat, broad leaf with a rounded tip.

From the inscriptions on the pointers, one may deduce a specific ritual of Mountain Jews: before reading, the Torah is displayed to the congregation and the pointer indicated to it as a conceptual parallel to the guiding hand of God.

There are a number of different names for the pointer used by the Mountain Jews, indicating the variety of traditions. Most common ones are etzba (Hebrew: אצבע, lit. 'finger') and kulmus (קולמוס).

== See also ==
- Manicule
- Pointer (rod)
