= David Rozenberg =

David Iokhelevich Rosenberg (Russian: Давид Иохелевич Розенберг; 27 November 1879, Šateikiai – 17 February 1950, Moscow) was a Soviet economist.

He joined the General Jewish Labour Bund in Odesa in the early 1900s and was exiled to Narymsky Krai in Siberia in 1914. After the Russian Revolution he joined the Russian Communist Party (Bolsheviks), moved to Moscow and taught Marxist-Leninist political economy. Author of several texts that were endorsed as textbooks during the Stalin era and beyond. Was elected a corresponding member of the Academy of Sciences of the Soviet Union in 1939. He is buried at the Novodevichy Cemetery in Moscow.

He was criticized by Mikhail Vasilyevich Popov.

== Works ==
- Class Struggle (1921)
- Comments on "Capital" by Karl Marx (1931–1933)
- History of Political Economy (1934–1936)
- How to Study Karl Marx's "Capital" (1938)
- Commentary to the 1st volume of Karl Marx's "Capital", (1961)
- Commentary to the 2nd and 3rd volume of Karl Marx's "Capital", (1961)

== Family ==
- Spouse: Evgenia Borisovna.
- Children: Iosif (born 1914), Ruvim (born 1919) and Genrikh.

Iosif and Ruvim were students at the Faculty of History, Moscow State University. During WW2 with 975th artillery regiment, 8th Rifle Division of People's Militia, both MIA since 10/1941 near Yelnya. Genrikh (d. 1990s) worked at the Moscow Geologo-Exploratory Institute (МГРИ).
