= Maui Interscholastic League =

Hawaii athletic league

The Maui Interscholastic League or MIL consists of 13 Hawaii high schools that sponsor a number of athletic sports, including football, basketball, volleyball and soccer. Moloka'i High School and Lanai High School are voluntary members of the MIL due to the lack of other major high schools on the island of Moloka'i and Lanai. The War Memorial Stadium is used for the league's football games.

== Member institutions ==
Institution	Location	Founded	Enrolled Students	Budget per Student	Mascot	School Colors
Baldwin High School	Wailuku, Hawaii	1940	1,800	$12,423	Bears	Maroon, Blue & White
Hana High School	Hana, Hawaii	1912	700	$12,423	Dragons	Green & Gold
Kaahumanu Hou Christian School	Kahului, Hawaii	1989	119	N/A	Lions /Alii	Purple & Silver
Kamehameha Schools - Maui	Pukalani, Hawaii	1996	1082	N/A	Warriors	Blue & White
Kihei Charter School	Kihei, Hawaii	2001	272	$7,600	Tiger Sharks	Blue, Silver & Black
King Kekaulike High School	Pukalani, Hawaii	1995	1449	$12,423	NA Alii	Black & Teal
Lahainaluna High School	Lahaina, Hawaii	1831	883	$12,423	Lunas	Red & White
Lanai High School	Lanai City, Hawaii	1939	672	N/A	Pinelads/Pinelasses	Green & Gold
Maui High School	Kahului, Hawaii	1913	1344	$12,423	Sabers	Blue & White
Maui Preparatory Academy	Napili, Hawaii	2006	40	n/a	Pueo	Green & White
Moloka'i High School	Ho'olehua, Hawaii	1939	712	$12,423	The Mighty Farmers	Green, White & Black
St. Anthony High School	Wailuku, Hawaii	1884	200	N/A	Trojans	Navy Blue & Gold
Seabury Hall	Makawao, Hawaii	1964	416	N/A	Spartans	Red, White, & Blue

== Sports ==
The MIL fall and winter season sports include air riflery, basketball, bowling, cheerleading, cross-country, football, outrigger canoe paddling, soccer, girls' volleyball, swimming and diving, wrestling, and junior varsity softball.
