= King Kekaulike High School =

Information
- School type: High school
- Established: 1995; 31 years ago
- Grades: 9-12
- Enrollment: 1,311 (1998-1999)

King Kekaulike High School (KKHS), home of the Na Ali'i, was established in 1995 and is located in Pukalani, Hawaii. It serves the communities of Haiku, Kula, Makawao, Paia, and Pukalani.

== History and information ==
King Kekaulike High School opened in September 1995 with a freshman class of 383 students. It added a grade level each year from 1995 to 1998 until the student body had grown to include grades 9-12. Enrollment in the 1998-1999 school year was 1,311 students.

In 2013, King Kekaulike High School was named one of eleven "Best High Schools in Hawaii" by U.S. News & World Report and one of ten Hawaii schools in The Washington Post's annual index of "America's Most Challenging High Schools." The Na Ali'i were the only Maui County school to receive such honors that year, though both King Kekaulike and Maui High School were recognized in the Post's 2012 index.

=== Administration ===
- Amy Strand, Principal

== Campus ==
=== Performing Arts Center ===
Construction for the King Kekaulike Performing Arts Center was proposed December 2012. Construction began in October of 2015, and finished April 2018. Located in the front of the school; the $35 million building can seat 414 people in the house with a 4-aisle plan. This combines audience cohesion with multiple exit/entrance opportunities to minimize the time it takes students to get seated for a class period event. With a stage 36’ deep and approximately 100’ wide, the Performing Arts is equipped with professional-grade lighting and sound equipment, a flyloft/rigging rail, and a scene shop. The Performing Arts Center has hosted Maui’s first public school TEDx Youth event, the 2019 Maui County Mayoral Debate, and many functions of the King Kekaulike Band and Drama programs.

==== Notable Plays ====
- Annie
- The Outsiders

== Academics ==
The student population consists of many different ethnicities including Pacific Islander, White, Asian, Black and Hispanic (King Kekaulike High School Profile (2020-21)). Thirty-six percent of the student body is eligible for free and reduced lunch and nine percent is eligible for free and reduced lunch. In 2009 and 2016, King Kekaulike received the Kaimana Award.

There are 16 AP classes including Psychology, Environmental Science, Japanese, Physics, Statistics, Calculus, Art History, Spanish, World History, and Biology.

== Extracurricular activities ==
=== Athletics ===
King Kekaulike High School is a member of the Maui Interscholastic League (MIL) and Hawaii High School Athletic Association (HHSAA). The school competes in fifteen varsity team sports for boys and sixteen for girls. The Athletic Director is Mark Makimoto.

==== Team sports ====
- Fall sports
  - Air Riflery
  - Bowling
  - Cross Country
  - Football
  - Girls volleyball
  - Cheerleading
- Winter sports
  - Basketball
  - Canoe Paddling
  - Soccer
  - Swimming and Diving
  - Wrestling
- Spring sports
  - Baseball
  - Golf
  - Judo
  - Tennis
  - Track & Field
  - Boys Volleyball
  - Girls Water Polo
  - Girls Softball

==== State championships ====
King Kekaulike High School has captured two state championships for team sports:

1. Canoe Paddling - Mixed (2004)
2. Football - Division II (2006)

King Kekaulike High School has captured many state championships for individual sports:

- Wrestling
  - Mike Wheeler (wrestler) 160 lbs. (2003)
  - Landon Kerbow 171 lbs. (2007)
  - Jonathan Pico 160 lbs. (2011)
  - Austin Bloch 140 lbs. (2012)
  - Kyla Aruda 108 lbs. (2015)
- Cross Country
  - Bailey Massenburg (2008)

==== MIL championships ====
King Kekaulike High School has captured numerous MIL championships. The first girls MIL Championship was for volleyball in 1999. The first boys MIL Championship was for soccer in the 1999-2000 season, when the team went undefeated with a 12-0 record. Since then the school has won numerous MIL titles in a variety of different sports.

== Notable alumni ==
- Sumiko Inaba, mixed martial artist
