= Uso Seumalo =

American football player (born 2002)

Profile
- Position: Nose tackle

Personal information
- Born: May 17, 2002 (age 24); Kaunakakai, Hawaii, U.S.
- Listed height: 6 ft 3 in (1.91 m)
- Listed weight: 330 lb (150 kg)

Career information
- High school: Molokaʻi (Hoʻolehua, Hawaii)
- College: Garden City CC (2020–2021); Kansas State (2022–2025)
- NFL draft: 2026: undrafted

Career history
- Seattle Seahawks (2026)*
- * Offseason or practice squad member only

Awards and highlights
- All-Big 12 Honorable Mention (2023)
- Stats at Pro Football Reference

Vaai Jericho "Uso" Seumalo (born May 17, 2002) is an American professional football nose tackle. He played college football at Garden City Community College and Kansas State and was signed by the Seattle Seahawks as an undrafted free agent following the 2026 NFL draft.

== Early life ==
Seumalo was born in Kaunakakai, Hawaii and attended Molokaʻi High School in Hoʻolehua, Hawaii.

== College career ==
=== Garden City Community College ===
Seumalo began his college career at Garden City Community College, where he played two seasons from 2020 to 2021.

In 2020, he appeared in eight games and had eight solo tackles, 20 assisted tackles, 7.5 tackles for loss, and two sacks.

In 2021, he played in 11 games with nine solo tackles, 10 assisted tackles, 16 tackles for loss, and three sacks, along with two passes broken up.

Over his two seasons at Garden City, he played in 19 games and totaled 17 solo tackles, 30 assisted tackles, 23.5 tackles for loss, five sacks, and two passes broken up.

=== Kansas State ===
Seumalo transferred to Kansas State in 2022, the season in which he had four solo tackles, one assisted tackle, two tackles for loss, and two pass deflections.

In 2023, he appeared in 11 games with eight solo tackles, 10 assisted tackles, 1.5 tackles for loss, 1.5 sacks, one pass deflection, and one fumble recovery. He earned **All‑Big 12 Honorable Mention** that season.

In 2024, he played in 13 games and had six solo tackles, eight assisted tackles, three tackles for loss, and one pass deflection.

As a senior in 2025, he appeared in all 12 games with two starts and had 10 solo tackles, 10 assisted tackles, 2.5 tackles for loss, one sack, and two pass deflections.

Over his collegiate career at Kansas State, Seumalo played in 50 games with two starts and had 28 solo tackles, 29 assisted tackles, nine tackles for loss, 2.5 sacks, five pass deflections, and one fumble recovery.

== Professional career ==
Pre-draft measurables
Height	Weight	Arm length	Hand span	Wingspan	40-yard dash	10-yard split	20-yard split	20-yard shuttle	Three-cone drill	Vertical jump	Broad jump	Bench press
6 ft 2 5/8 in (1.90 m)	330 lb (150 kg)	32 3/4 in (0.83 m)	9 3/4 in (0.25 m)	6 ft 9 1/4 in (2.06 m)	5.27 s	1.80 s	3.00 s	4.83 s	7.71 s	27.5 in (0.70 m)	8 ft 7 in (2.62 m)	28 reps
All values from Pro Day

On May 14, 2026, Seumalo signed a three-year, $3.11 million contract with the Seattle Seahawks as an undrafted free agent. Seumalo was waived by Seattle on August 30 as a part of final roster cuts; he was re-signed to the team's practice squad the following day. Seumalo was released from Seattle's practice squad on September 3. He re-signed to the team's practice squad on September 23, but was again released on September 29.
