= Molokaʻi High School =

Coordinates: 21.163432°N 157.047913°W

- Hoʻolehua, Hawaiʻi 96729

Information
- Type: Public high school
- Established: 1939
- Principal: Katina Soares
- Staff: 24.00 (FTE)
- Grades: 9–12
- Gender: Coeducational
- Enrollment: 381 (2022–23)
- Colors: Green, White & Black
- Team name: Mighty Farmers
- Accreditation: Western Association of Schools and Colleges
- Website: Official website

Molokaʻi High School is a public high school in Molokaʻi, Hawaii. It is a part of the Hawaii State Department of Education.

It is located on a 27-acre (110,000 m^{2}) expanse in a Hawaiian Homestead community approximately 7 miles (11 km) miles from Kaunakakai town where the state and county offices, hospitals, doctors' offices, banks, library, family-owned grocery stores and gas stations are located. All four elementary schools and one intermediate school feed into this single public high school on Molokaʻi. During the 2004–2005 school year, the Department of Education separated the Intermediate School from the High School, creating two distinct schools on the Ho'olehua campus.

== Core subjects and electives ==
Molokaʻi High School offers a Gifted and Talented Program, Hawaiian Language Immersion Program, English as the Second Language, Comprehensive School Alienation Program, Advanced Placement, Honors, Intensive Learning Program, Alternative Learning Program, Special Education and Graduation, Reality and Dual Role Skills (GRADS). Molokaʻi High School has also established a Natural Resources Academy (NaRA), which is a project-based, 2-year sequence of learning that utilizes the natural resources of Molokaʻi. In the 2006–2007 school year, Molokaʻi High School will implement a project and community based technology course called EAST. Study Skills classes designed to remediate or accelerate a student's individual skills are offered in reading and math.

== Co-curricular activities ==
The school includes: Baseball, Chess, Swimming, Softball, Basketball, Wrestling, Cross Country, Air Riflery, Girls Soccer, Paddling, Track and Field, and Volleyball. Molokaʻi High School is a voluntary member of the Maui Interscholastic League due to the lack of other major high schools on the island of Molokaʻi. Molokaʻi High School also won back to back state championships in 1999 and 2000 for Baseball. Also in 2009 the Girls Basketball team won states for division II and the girls volleyball team won in 2010 for division II. Molokaʻi High School-excluding individual track and wrestling- has won a total of 4 HHSAA Championships. Molokai High School also offers a FIRST Robotics Competition Program for students looking into STEM Careers. In 2019, Molokai Robotics made history by qualifying for and competing in the 2019 FIRST Championship - becoming the only program out of MHS to compete in a World Championship of any kind.

== Notable alumni ==
- John S. K. Kauwe III, Biologist and president of Brigham Young University–Hawaii
- Keith Luuloa, Former professional baseball player (Anaheim Angels)
- Kimo von Oelhoffen, Former professional football player (Cincinnati Bengals, Pittsburgh Steelers)
- Uso Seumalo, NFL nose tackle (Seattle Seahawks)
