= Kimo von Oelhoffen =

American football player (born 1971)

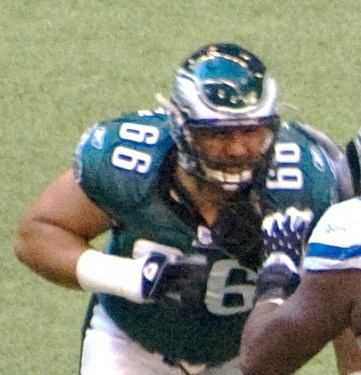
- Von Oelhoffen with the Philadelphia Eagles in 2007

No. 67, 66
- Positions: Defensive tackle, defensive end

Personal information
- Born: January 30, 1971 (age 55); Kaunakakai, Hawaii, U.S.
- Listed height: 6 ft 4 in (1.93 m)
- Listed weight: 299 lb (136 kg)

Career information
- High school: Molokaʻi (Hoʻolehua, Hawaii)
- College: Hawaii (1990); Walla Walla CC (1991); Boise State (1992–1993)
- NFL draft: 1994: 6th round, 162nd overall pick

Career history
- Cincinnati Bengals (1994–1999); Pittsburgh Steelers (2000–2005); New York Jets (2006); Philadelphia Eagles (2007)

Awards and highlights
- Super Bowl champion (XL)

Career NFL statistics
- Tackles: 356
- Sacks: 26.5
- Forced fumbles: 4
- Fumble recoveries: 7
- Stats at Pro Football Reference

Kimo K. von Oelhoffen (/ˈkiːmoʊ vənˈoʊlhɒfɪn/; born January 30, 1971) is an American former professional football player who was a defensive tackle in the National Football League (NFL). He played college football for the Hawaii Rainbow Warriors and Boise State Broncos before being selected by the Cincinnati Bengals in the sixth round of the 1994 NFL draft.

He also played for the Pittsburgh Steelers, New York Jets, and Philadelphia Eagles. He won the Vince Lombardi Trophy with the Steelers in Super Bowl XL against the Seattle Seahawks.

== College career ==
Von Oelhoffen graduated from Molokaʻi High School which did not have a football team. He played one season of high school football at Moanalua High School, which is located on the Hawaiian island of Oahu, in 1985.

Von Oelhoffen started playing at the University of Hawaiʻi, transferring to Walla Walla Community College the next year and finally settling at Boise State University. He suffered a number of injuries in college that slowed his development including a stress fracture in his foot in 1992 and a sprained ankle in 1993.

== Professional career ==
=== Cincinnati Bengals ===
The Cincinnati Bengals selected von Oelhoffen with the first pick of the sixth round of the 1994 NFL draft. In his first three seasons, he was largely a reserve, moving into the starting lineup in 1997. The next season, von Oelhoffen became a mainstay of the defensive line, starting every game and finishing second in tackles among defensive linemen.

=== Pittsburgh Steelers ===
After a strong 1999 season, where he recorded 24 tackles and four sacks, he signed with the Pittsburgh Steelers as an unrestricted free agent on a four-year $11 million contract. Pittsburgh initially inserted him as the starting nose tackle and converted him to defensive end. Von Oelhoffen would start all but one game from the 2000–2005 seasons. He won a Super Bowl ring in 2005 in his final season as a Steeler.

==== Carson Palmer's injury ====
During the 2005 Wildcard Playoff game against the Cincinnati Bengals, his former team, von Oelhoffen was involved in a controversial hit on Bengals quarterback Carson Palmer that occurred on the Bengals' second play from scrimmage and knocked Palmer out of the game with a severe knee injury. Von Oelhoffen, coming off a block set by guard Eric Steinbach, rolled into Palmer's left knee after Palmer released a pass 66 yards down field to wide receiver Chris Henry, who was also injured on the play. The injury to Palmer was severe, including damage to his anterior cruciate ligament, medial collateral ligament, and posterior cruciate ligament. MRIs later determined that Palmer's ACL, PCL, and MCL were all torn as a result of the hit. Cincinnati fans booed von Oelhoffen after watching the replays on the Jumbotron, thinking that a flag should have been thrown for a late hit or roughing the passer. However, no flag was thrown because the hit was deemed legal at the time.

Von Oelhoffen later apologized publicly for the hit rather than contact Palmer directly about the incident. Though Palmer confirmed that von Oelhoffen never contacted him personally to apologize, Palmer stated that the injury was "just part of the game."

During the off-season, the NFL Rules Committee modified the rule regarding low hits on quarterbacks. The so-called "Kimo Clause" now requires that defenders take every opportunity to avoid hitting a quarterback at or below the knees when the quarterback is in a defenseless position looking to throw with both feet on the ground.

=== New York Jets ===
For the 2006 season, von Oelhoffen signed with the New York Jets on a three-year $9.2 million deal. He spent one season with the Jets, viewed somewhat as a disappointment given his $3.2 million signing bonus.

=== Philadelphia Eagles ===
After being released by the Jets in training camp, von Oelhoffen signed a one-year deal with the Philadelphia Eagles. He would appear in eight games for them during that season. He was later released by the team. He has since retired from professional football.

== NFL career statistics ==
Legend
	Won the Super Bowl
**Bold**	Career high

=== Regular season ===
Year	Team	Games		Tackles				Interceptions				Fumbles			
Year	Team	GP	GS	Comb	Solo	Ast	Sck	Int	Yds	TD	Lng	FF	FR	Yds	TD
1994	CIN	6	0	2	2	0	0.0	0	0	0	0	0	0	0	0
1995	CIN	16	1	8	7	1	0.0	0	0	0	0	0	0	0	0
1996	CIN	11	1	15	11	4	1.0	0	0	0	0	0	0	0	0
1997	CIN	13	13	42	32	10	0.0	0	0	0	0	0	0	0	0
1998	CIN	16	16	**45**	**36**	9	0.0	0	0	0	0	0	0	0	0
1999	CIN	16	5	25	24	1	4.0	0	0	0	0	**1**	1	0	0
2000	PIT	16	16	44	29	**15**	1.0	0	0	0	0	**1**	0	0	0
2001	PIT	15	15	28	20	8	4.0	0	0	0	0	0	**2**	0	0
2002	PIT	16	16	22	12	10	3.0	0	0	0	0	0	1	0	0
2003	PIT	16	16	35	27	8	**8.0**	0	0	0	0	**1**	1	0	0
2004	PIT	16	15	24	16	8	1.0	0	0	0	0	0	**2**	**21**	0
2005	PIT	16	16	36	23	13	3.5	0	0	0	0	**1**	0	0	0
2006	NYJ	16	16	28	17	11	1.0	0	0	0	0	0	0	0	0
2007	PHI	8	1	2	1	1	0.0	0	0	0	0	0	0	0	0
		197	147	356	257	99	26.5	0	0	0	0	4	7	21	0

=== Playoffs ===
Year	Team	Games		Tackles				Interceptions				Fumbles			
Year	Team	GP	GS	Comb	Solo	Ast	Sck	Int	Yds	TD	Lng	FF	FR	Yds	TD
2001	PIT	2	2	4	4	0	0.0	0	0	0	0	0	0	0	0
2002	PIT	2	2	4	3	**1**	**1.0**	0	0	0	0	0	0	0	0
2004	PIT	2	2	4	3	**1**	0.0	0	0	0	0	0	0	0	0
2005	PIT	4	4	**5**	**5**	0	**1.0**	0	0	0	0	0	0	0	0
2006	NYJ	1	0	1	0	**1**	0.0	0	0	0	0	0	0	0	0
		11	10	18	15	3	2.0	0	0	0	0	0	0	0	0

== Personal life ==
His daughter, Talia von Oelhoffen, plays for the USC Trojans women's basketball team.
