= Natsui =

Natsui (written: 夏井 or 夏居) is a Japanese surname. Notable people with the surname include:

- Dorothy Natsui (1909–2005), American child psychiatrist
- Runa Natsui (夏居 瑠奈; born 1995), Japanese actress
- Shokichi Natsui (夏井 昇吉; 1925–2006), Japanese judoka

== See also ==
- Natsui Station (夏井駅, Natsui-eki), train station in Fukushima Prefecture, Japan
- Ōsumi-Natsui Station (大隅夏井駅, Ōsumi-Natsui-eki), train station in Shibushi, Kagoshima, Japan
- Rikuchū-Natsui Station (陸中夏井駅, Rikuchū-Natsui-eki), train station in Kuji, Iwate, Japan
