= Seabury Hall =

Private school in Makawao, Hawaii, US

Location
- 480 Olinda Road; Makawao, Maui, Hawaiʻi 96768; United States

Information
- Type: Private, college-prep, day
- Denomination: Episcopal Church
- Established: 1964
- Head of school: Nicholas Rodriguez
- Faculty: 49.8 (on FTE basis)
- Grades: 5–12
- Gender: Coeducational
- Enrollment: 518 (2023–2024)
- Student to teacher ratio: 10:1
- Hours in school day: 7
- Colors: Blue; Red
- Athletics: 18 interscholastic sports
- Athletics conference: Maui Interscholastic League
- Mascot: Spartan
- Website: www.seaburyhall.org

Seabury Hall is a private college preparatory school in Makawao (on the island of Maui). It is affiliated with the Episcopal Church. It was founded in 1964 and serves middle and high school students. Seabury Hall has been designated as a U.S. Department of Education Blue Ribbon School. The Seabury Hall mascot is the Spartan, and the school colors are blue and red. Perched high on the slopes of Haleakala, Seabury Hall offers views of the rest of Maui, the Pacific, and the islands of Kahoolawe, Lanai, and Molokai.

== Campus ==
The Seabury Hall campus contains an Upper School Building, two Middle School Buildings (Carter Hall & Haynes Hall), the 'A'ali'ikuhonua Creative Arts Center, the Erdman Athletic Center, the Castle Library, Cooper House, the AIM center (art, innovation, and music), and several other buildings. Faculty housing is also available on campus for teachers and staff.

The A'ali'ikuhonua Creative Arts Center is a building that is a part of the campus. The project cost $5.4 million and can seat up to 400 people. It opened in September 2012 and is used for performances, plays, music shows, and daily assemblies.

== Seabury Hall Craft Fair ==
The annual Seabury Hall Craft Fair is a gathering of arts and entertainment located at the Seabury Hall campus. It is always held on the Saturday before Mother's Day in May. The fair features over 100 artists and crafters, including Maui-based woodworkers, traditional Hawaiian artists, jewelers, ceramists, and weavers. The fair is largely run by parents and students who are required to participate in order to raise money for financial aid. In addition, there are specialty foods, live music, fresh produce, cut flowers, children's games, talent show, and a silent auction.

== Student life ==
Seabury Hall's student government plays an active role in the day-to-day life of the student body. It currently consists of five elected officers: president, vice president, secretary, treasurer, and historian. It also has a variety of officer elected committees to further expand the amount the organization can achieve.

Seabury Hall's students are also very active in extracurricular activities, including sports, clubs, and community service.

== Athletics ==
Seabury Hall offers a variety of interscholastic sports. Fall sports include air riflery, cross country, football, and girls volleyball. Winter sports include basketball, paddling, soccer, and swimming & diving. Spring sports include baseball, golf, softball, surfing, tennis, girls water polo, boys volleyball, and track & field. Yoga and pilates classes are also available for middle school students, while crossfit classes are available for upper school students.

Student athletes are eligible to win a few different awards, such as Lettering, Athlete of the Year, Scholar Athlete of the Year, Super Spartan Award, and Spartan Award.

== Winterim ==
Winterim is a hallmark program at Seabury Hall that brings together groups of students from various grades to participate in a week-long, out-of-classroom educational experience of their choosing at the end of March. Students rank their top choices from a catalog of options, with themes ranging from crafts, to sports, to cultural exploration. All grades participate in Winterim, but younger students are typically selected for on-island programs that occur during the day, while older students may be selected for off-island programs and overnight programs. Several Winterim programs occur off the island of Maui, and occasionally outside of the state of Hawaii. Previous off-island programs have included trips to neighboring Hawaiian islands, Peru, Japan, and more. Each Winterim is led by an expert in the field, from outside of Seabury Hall, as well as at least one Seabury Hall faculty. There are no normal classes during the winter session. Due to COVID-19, Winterim instead takes place on campus with events run by the teachers. Students can earn stamps in the Winterim Passport by visiting learning stations and completing the tasks. Once their passport is full, it can be turned in for a chance to win fun prizes. As of 2023, Winterim returned to normal.

== In popular culture ==
The 1971 film Rainbow Bridge was filmed at Seabury Hall during the summer vacation, when the school was empty.
