= Myra English =

- Also known as: Myra English
- Born: February 22, 1933; Makawao, Maui
- Died: March 29, 2001 (aged 68) Honolulu, Hawaii
- Occupation: Live performer
- Instrument: Ukulele
- Years active: 1950–2001
- Labels: Lehua, Hula

Myra English (February 22, 1933 – March 29, 2001) was a popular performer and celebrity in Hawaii, known as "The Champagne Lady" of Hawaiian music. In 1968, she zoomed to the top of the local record chart with her hit “Drinking Champagne”. Written by Bill Mack, it became her signature song.

== Early life ==
Born February 22, 1933, in Makawao on the island of Maui, English was raised in Paia where she first began performing as a singer and instrumentalist. She graduated from Maui High School and attended business school on Oahu. She later moved to Honolulu, where she continued to hone her performing talent.

== Career ==
While working in Seattle, Washington in 1968, English heard the song “Drinking Champagne” on the radio. At the time, the song was a hit for the country music performer Cal Smith. Due to her experience as an entertainer, she knew that the song was well suited for the Hawaiian audience. Returning to Hawaii, she recorded the song for Hula Records. Her version of the song became a regional hit, and went on to become a standard.

Due to her success with “Drinking Champagne”, English established herself as a successful entertainer in Waikiki. Her fame led her to become a leading spokesman for the Hawaiian tourism industry, and she worked for such companies as Aloha Airlines, Hawaiian Air, United Airlines, and the Hawaii Visitors & Convention Bureau. Continuing to perform successfully, she gained some success in Japan.

In addition to her success as a performer and promoter of Hawaii tourism, she also worked as an assistant to various state legislators.

== Personal life ==
English was married to Chelliot Wayne Gibbs for 46 years, when she died on March 29, 2001 (aged 68). They had four children: Pat Cabrera, Wayne Gibbs, Kenneth Gibbs, and John Gibbs.

== Legacy ==
The Hawai'i Academy of Recording Arts awarded English the 2001 Na Hoku Hanohano Lifetime Achievement Award for her contributions to the entertainment industry in Hawaii.
