= Terry Albritton =

American track and field athlete (1955–2005)

Biographical details
- Born: January 14, 1955; Newport Beach, California
- Died: September 1, 2005 (aged 50); Phnom Penh, Cambodia

Coaching career (HC unless noted)
- 1979–1985: Hawaii (S&C)
- 1990–2004: St. Anthony (HI) (assistant)

Terence Hillary Albritton (January 14, 1955 – September 1, 2005) was an American track and field athlete, former shot put world record holder, and coach.

== Career ==
Albritton was born in Newport Beach, California and attended Newport Harbor High School. He went on to the University of Hawaii and later graduated from Stanford University. He was a strength coach at the University of Hawaii from 1979 to 1985. He is regarded as a pioneer in importing the training techniques from the Soviet Union to the United States. These methods include power cleans, plyometrics, and other fast twitching muscle training techniques.

From 1990 to 2004, Albritton was a teacher and assistant football coach at St. Anthony School in Wailuku, Hawaii and was also a personal trainer on Maui for professional athletes, including Shane Victorino of the Los Angeles Dodgers.

Albritton suffered a fatal heart attack in Phnom Penh, Cambodia, where he had retired in 2004. At the time he had been writing a screenplay about travels in the Soviet Union. He was survived by sons, Shane and Thomas Albritton, and grandson, Thomas Vaethroeder.

== Shot put accomplishments ==
- World record: 71 ft 8 1/3 in (21.852 m), 1976, Cooke Field, University of Hawaii
- National shot put champion, 1976, 1977
- National shot put runner-up, 1975

Records
Preceded by (United States) Al Feuerbach	Men's Shot Put World Record Holder; February 21, 1976 – June 10, 1976	Succeeded by (Soviet Union) Aleksandr Baryshnikov
