= Keone Kapisi =

Samoan footballer (born 1994)

Personal information
- Date of birth: 19 April 1994 (age 32)
- Place of birth: Pukalani, Hawaii, U.S.
- Position: Midfielder

Team information
- Current team: BYU Cougars men's soccer

Senior career*
Years	Team	Apps	(Gls)
2016	Maui Sabers		
2017–	BYU		

International career^{‡}
2016–	Samoa	4	(0)
- * Club domestic league appearances and goals as of 19 February 2017 ‡ National team caps and goals as of 18 July 2019

Keone Kapisi (born 19 April 1994) is a Samoan footballer who has represented Samoa internationally. He plays as a midfielder for BYU Cougars men's soccer.

== Personal life ==
Kapisi was born in Pukalani, Hawaii and educated at Maui High School in Hawaii and Brigham Young University in Provo, Utah.

== Career ==
In 2017, he was selected for the BYU team to contest the World University Games in Taipei.

He was selected for the Samoa national football team for the 2016 OFC Nations Cup. In June 2019 he was named to the squad for the 2019 Pacific Games.
