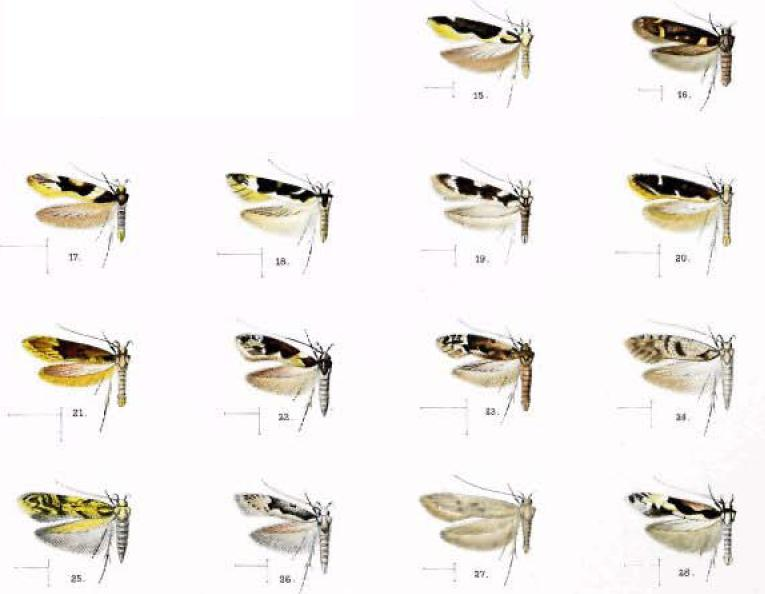
- Illustrations in Fauna Hawaiiensis: 15. Hyposmocoma nebulifera, 16. Hyposmocoma torquata, 17. Hyposmocoma notabilis, 18. Hyposmocoma lebetella, 19. Hyposmocoma tenuipalpis, 20. Hyposmocoma commensella, 21. Hyposmocoma leporella, 22. Hyposmocoma abjecta, 23. Hyposmocoma blackburnii, 24. Hyposmocoma cupreomaculata, 25. Hyposmocoma progressa, 26. Hyposmocoma domicolens, 27. Hyposmocoma suffusa, 28. Hyposmocoma lupella

Scientific classification
- Domain: Eukaryota
- Kingdom: Animalia
- Phylum: Arthropoda
- Class: Insecta
- Order: Lepidoptera
- Family: Cosmopterigidae
- Genus: Hyposmocoma
- Species: H. blackburnii

Binomial name
- Hyposmocoma blackburnii (Butler, 1881)

Synonyms
- Hyposmochoma blackburnii Butler, 1881

= Hyposmocoma blackburnii =

Species of moth

Hyposmocoma blackburnii is a species of moth of the family Cosmopterigidae. It was first described by Arthur Gardiner Butler in 1881. It is endemic to the Hawaiian island of Maui. The type locality is Haleakalā.

The larvae have been recorded in dead wood of Acacia koa.
