= Kīhei, Hawaii =

Kīhei
- Census-designated place
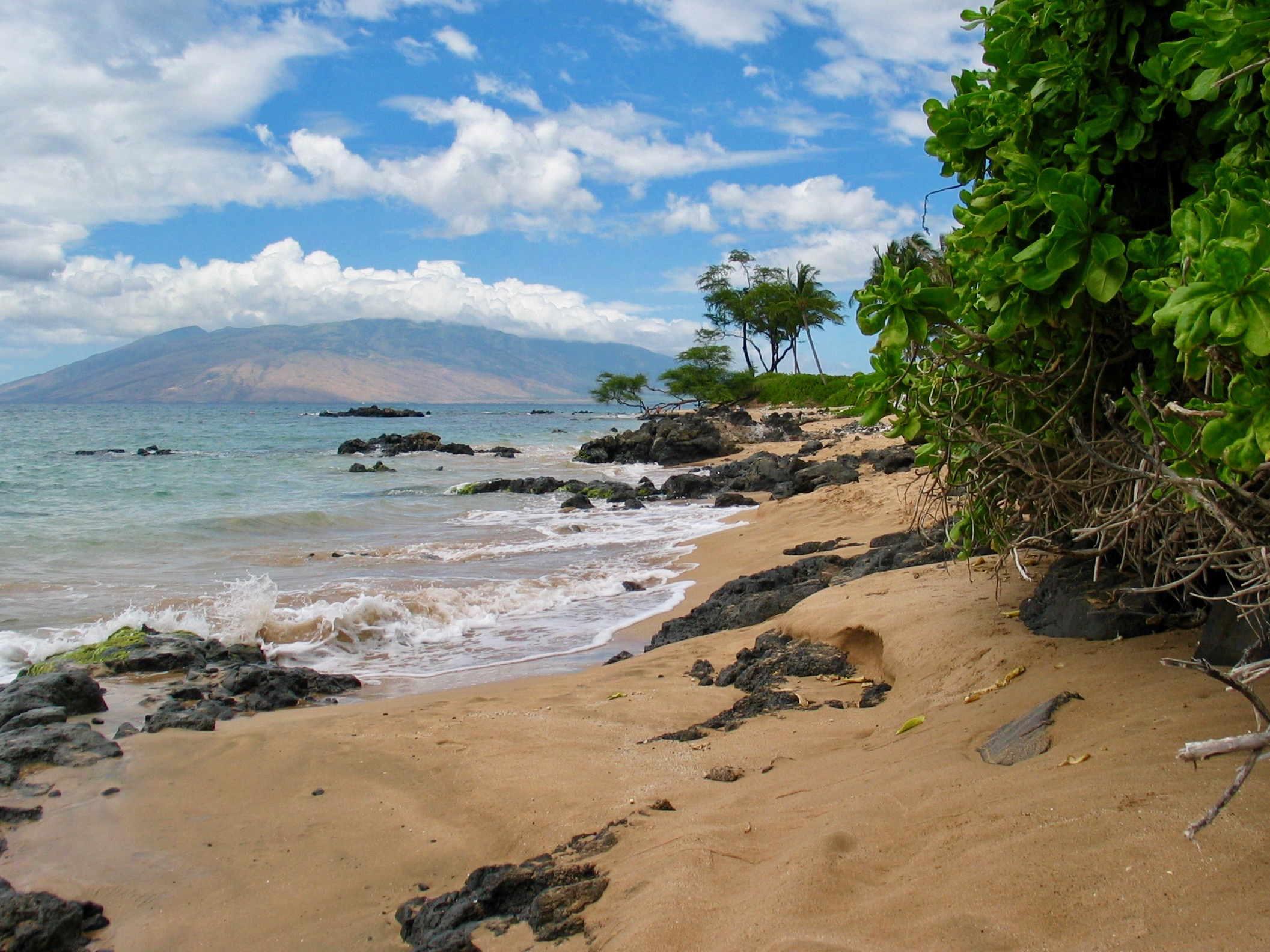
- Kīhei beach with the West Maui Mountains in the distance

- Location in Maui County and the state of Hawaii

- Location in Hawaii
- Coordinates: 20°45′33″N 156°27′26″W
- Country: United States
- State: Hawaii
- County: Maui

Area
  - Total: 11.75 sq mi (30.42 km^{2})
  - Land: 9.36 sq mi (24.25 km^{2})
  - Water: 2.38 sq mi (6.17 km^{2})
- Elevation: 9.8 ft (3 m)

Population (2020)
  - Total: 21,423
  - Density: 2,287.9/sq mi (883.36/km^{2})
- Time zone: UTC-10 (Hawaii-Aleutian)
- ZIP code: 96753
- Area code: 808
- FIPS code: 15-36500
- GNIS feature ID: 0361181

Kīhei (Hawaiian pronunciation: [tiːˈhɛj], lit. 'cape, cloak') is a census-designated place (CDP) in Maui County, Hawaii, United States. The population was 21,423 at the 2020 census.

== Geography ==
Kīhei is located at 20°45′33″N 156°27′26″W (20.759122, −156.457228).

According to the United States Census Bureau, the CDP has an area of 11.7 square miles (30.2 km^{2}), of which 9.3 square miles (24.0 km^{2}) is land and 2.4 square miles (6.2 km^{2}), or 20.44%, is water. It is considered to be the South Side of Maui, on the leeward side of Haleakala. The climate is arid, receiving no more than 10 inches (250 mm) of rain per year.

== Demographics ==
Historical population
| Census | Pop. | Note | %± |
|---|---|---|---|
| 2010 | 20,881 | | — |
| 2020 | 21,423 | | 2.6% |
U.S. Decennial Census

As of the census of 2000, there were 16,749 people, 6,170 households, and 3,813 families residing in the CDP. The population density was 1,648.6 inhabitants per square mile (636.5/km^{2}). There were 9,170 housing units at an average density of 902.6 per square mile (348.5/km^{2}). The racial makeup of the CDP was 47.76% White, 6.74% African American, 0.48% Native American, 24.72% Asian, 7.85% Pacific Islander, 1.58% from other races, and 16.87% from two or more races. Hispanic or Latino of any race were 1.52% of the population.

There were 6,170 households, of which 32.0% had children under the age of 18 living with them, 45.7% were married couples living together, 10.6% had a female householder with no husband present, and 38.2% were non-families. 25.7% of all households were made up of individuals, and 4.0% had someone living alone who was 65 years of age or older. The average household size was 2.70 and the average family size was 3.31.

In the CDP the population was spread out, with 25.1% under the age of 18, 8.1% from 18 to 24, 36.2% from 25 to 44, 23.6% from 45 to 64, and 7.0% who were 65 years of age or older. The median age was 35 years. For every 100 females, there were 103.1 males. For every 100 females age 18 and over, there were 103.3 males.

The median income for a household in the CDP was $46,215, and the median income for a family was $50,738. Males had a median income of $33,229 versus $26,881 for females. The per capita income for the CDP was $21,591. About 7.0% of families and 10.1% of the population were below the poverty line, including 8.8% of those under 18 and 5.1% of those 65 or older.

== Public transport ==
Although stops and hours of operation are limited, Kīhei is served by the County of Maui's Maui Bus public bus system, with direct routes to transit hubs in Kahului and Maalaea. Connections can be made from these locations to Haiku-Pauwela, Honokowai, Kaanapali, Kapalua, Kula, Lahaina, Makawao. Napili, Paia, Pukalani, Waiehu, Waihee, Waikapu, and Wailuku, as well as Maui's principal airport (OGG) near Kahului. Bus rules limit passengers to a single piece of carry-on sized baggage; larger luggage is prohibited. Fare collection was temporarily suspended in the wake of the Maui wildfires of 2023. The service is still effectively free as of January 2024.

There is also a commuter parking lot at the corner of highway 310 (North Kihei Road) and highway 30 (Honoapi'ilani Highway), the Kihei Junction Park and Ride in adjacent Wailuku. No public bus service stops here, but it is near Ma'alaea Harbor Village, where there is a public transportation stop. It is primarily used by hikers, bicyclists, and ride sharers looking for a meeting place centrally located between Kīhei, Lahaina, and Wailuku.

== Attractions ==
The Kīhei Aquatic Center hosts swim meets and other aquatic activities.

== Research ==
Several research facilities are in Kīhei, including the main offices of the Hawaiian Islands Humpback Whale National Marine Sanctuary, seed operations by Bayer Crop Science, and the Maui Research and Technology Park, which is home to the Maui High Performance Computing Center (MHPCC) and the Pacific Disaster Center and is overseen by the Air Force Maui Optical and Supercomputing observatory (AMOS).

== Education ==
The Hawaii Department of Education operates the following in Kīhei:

- Kihei Elementary School
- Kamali'i Elementary School
- Lokelani Intermediate School
- Kulanihakoi High School
  - Until Kulanihakoi opened in 2022, students generally attended Maui High School.

The Hawaii State Public Library System operates the Kihei Library.

== Gallery ==
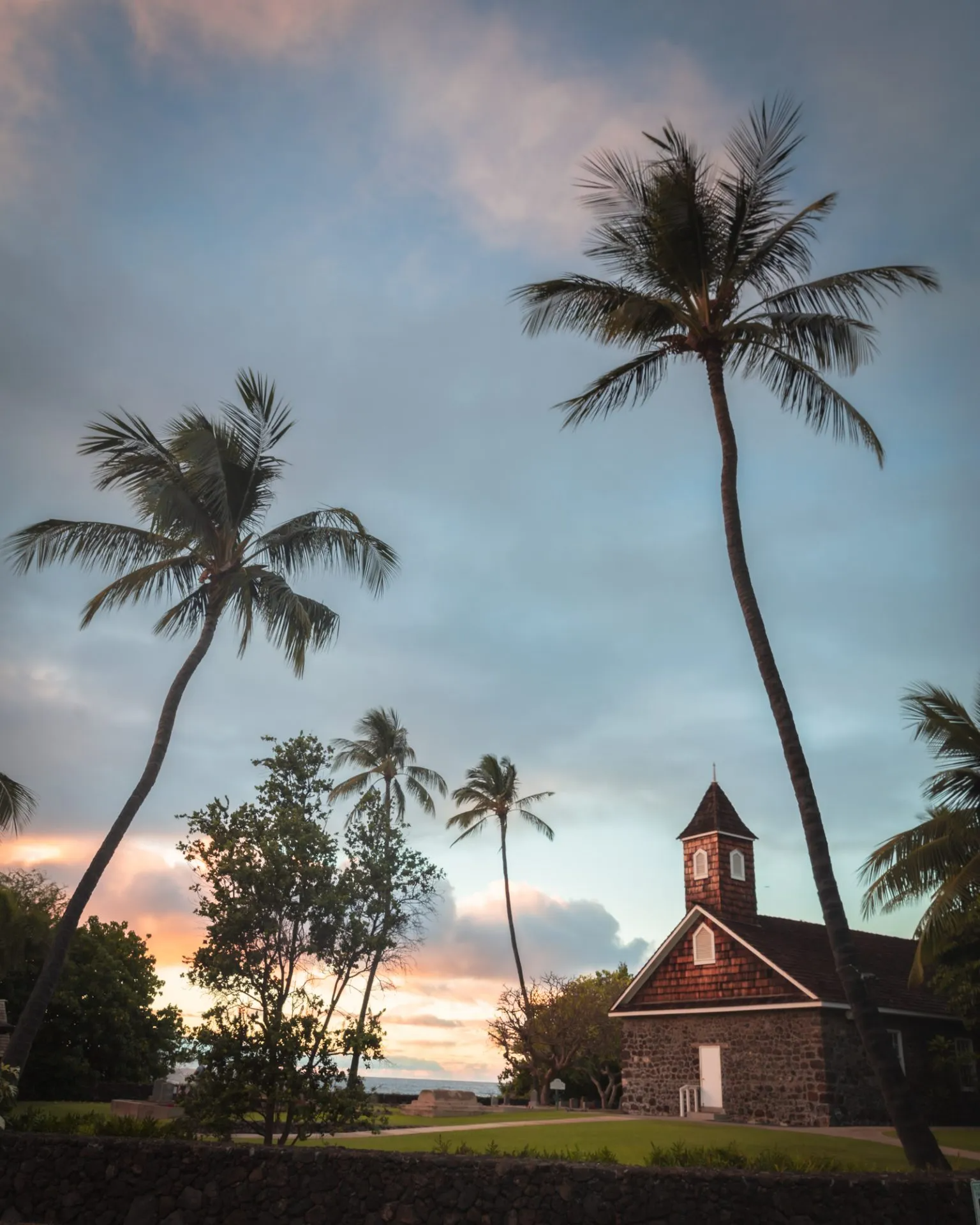
Keawala'i Congregational Church

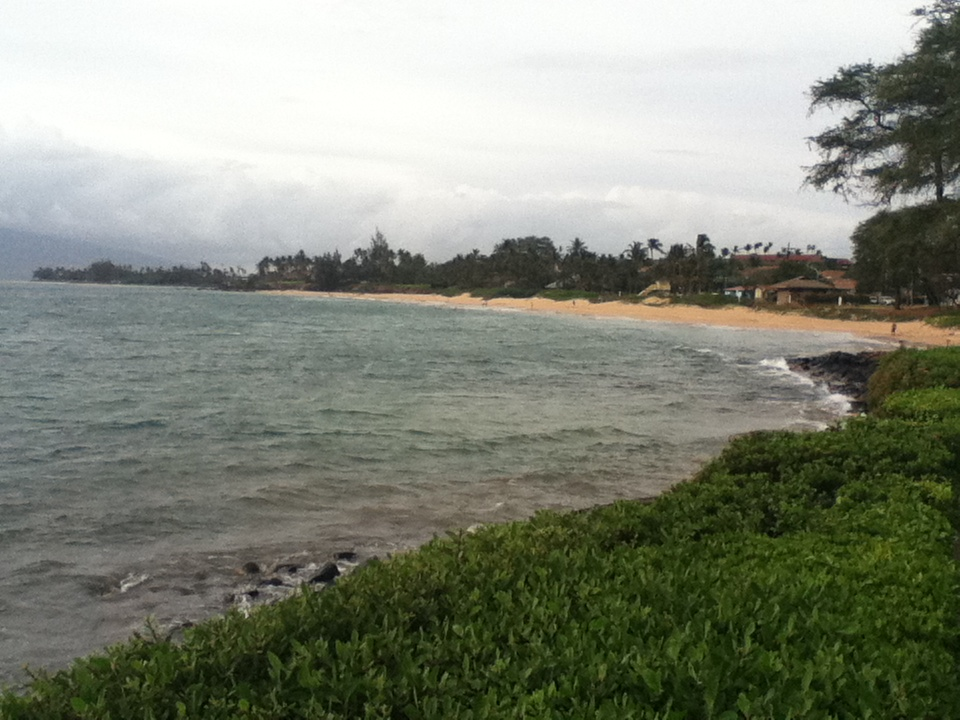
Kamaole Beach Park, looking north

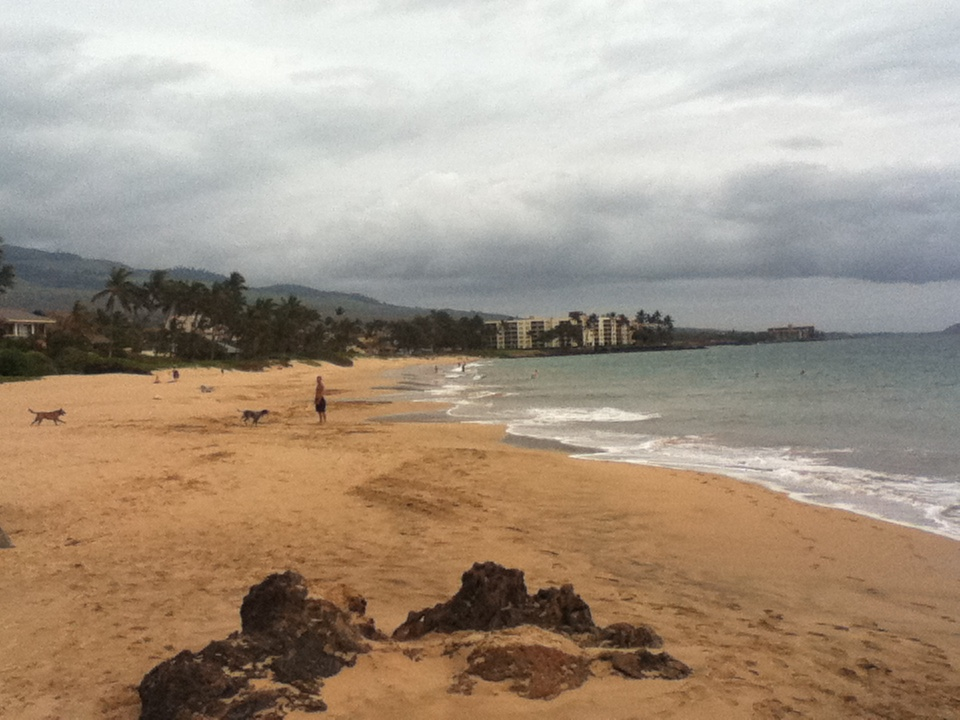
Kamaole Beach Park, looking south

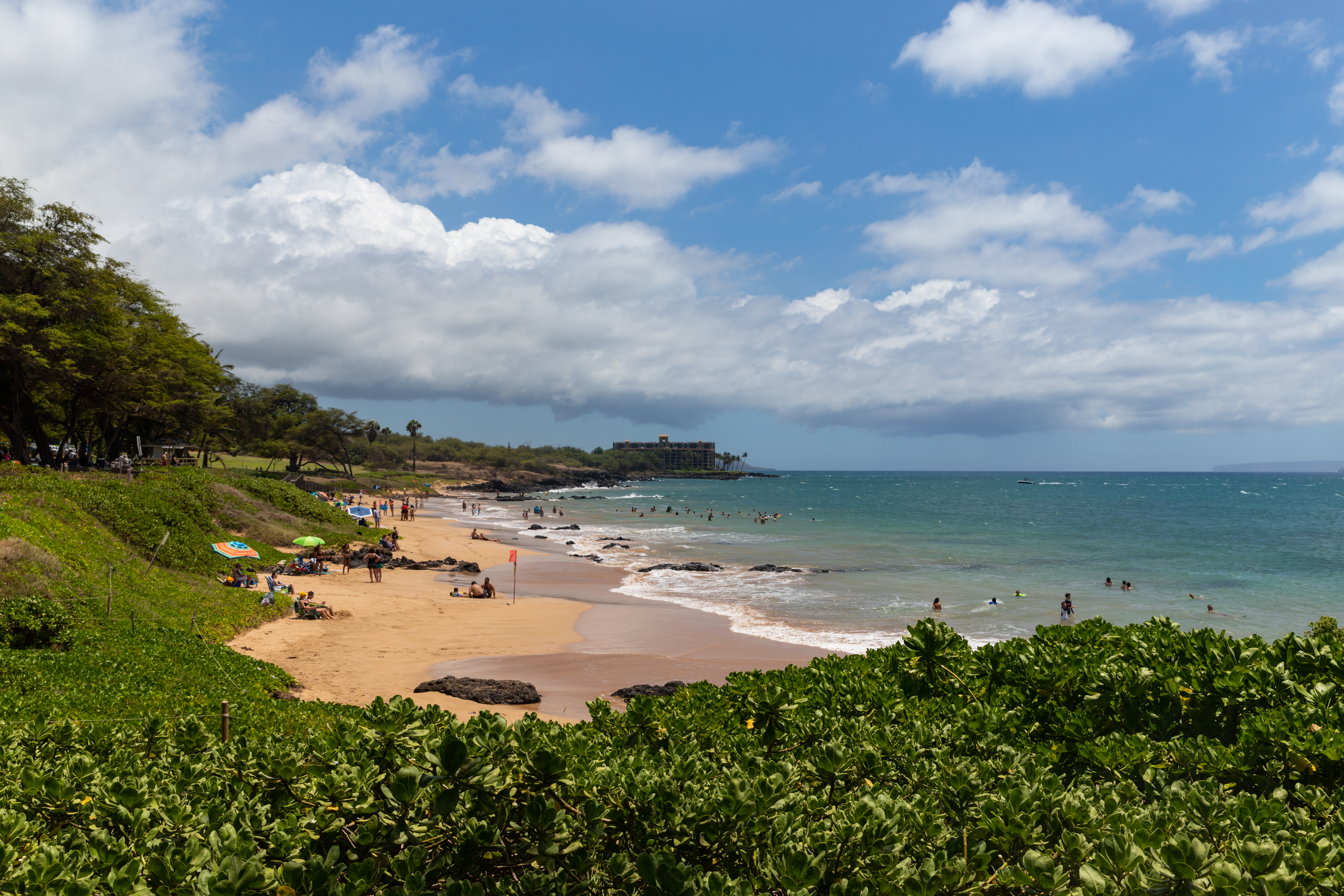
Kamaole Beach Park III, Maui, Hawaii

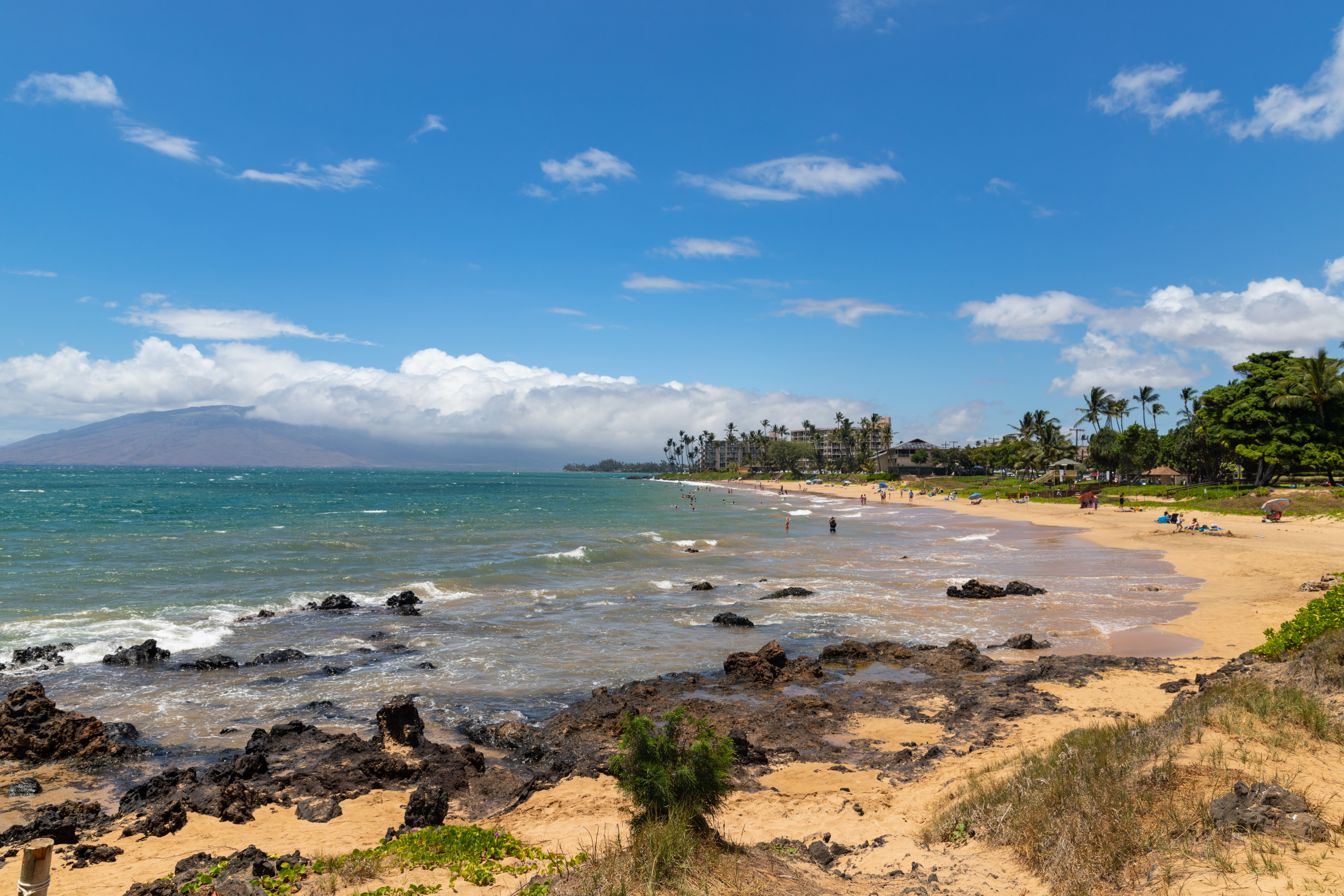
Kamaole Beach, Maui, Hawaii
