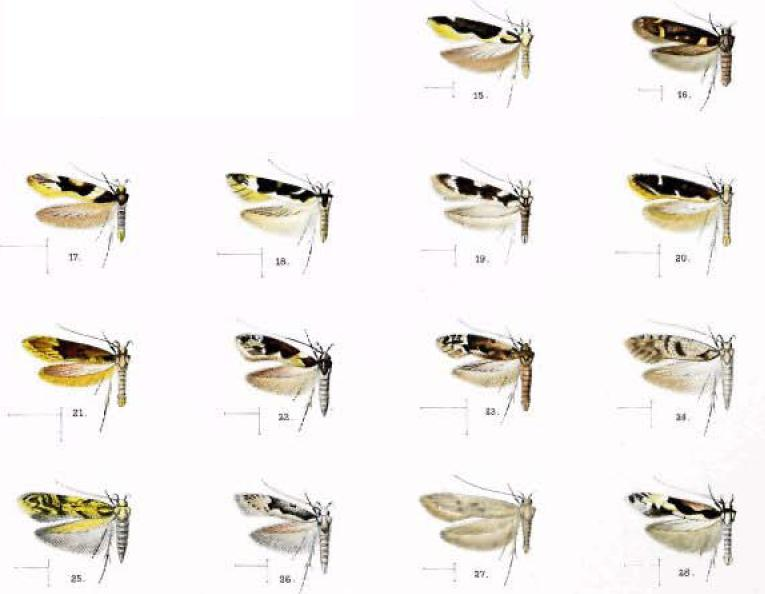
- Illustrations in Fauna Hawaiiensis: 15. Hyposmocoma nebulifera, 16. Hyposmocoma torquata, 17. Hyposmocoma notabilis, 18. Hyposmocoma lebetella, 19. Hyposmocoma tenuipalpis, 20. Hyposmocoma commensella, 21. Hyposmocoma leporella, 22. Hyposmocoma abjecta, 23. Hyposmocoma blackburnii, 24. Hyposmocoma cupreomaculata, 25. Hyposmocoma progressa, 26. Hyposmocoma domicolens, 27. Hyposmocoma suffusa, 28. Hyposmocoma lupella

Scientific classification
- Domain: Eukaryota
- Kingdom: Animalia
- Phylum: Arthropoda
- Class: Insecta
- Order: Lepidoptera
- Family: Cosmopterigidae
- Genus: Hyposmocoma
- Species: H. cupreomaculata

Binomial name
- Hyposmocoma cupreomaculata Walsingham, 1907

= Hyposmocoma cupreomaculata =

Species of moth

Hyposmocoma cupreomaculata is a species of moth of the family Cosmopterigidae. It was first described by Lord Walsingham in 1907. It is endemic to the Hawaiian island of Molokai.
