= Kulanihakoi High School =

High school in Kihei, Hawaii, United States

Coordinates: 20.7624°N 156.4451°W

Kūlanihāko’i High School is a public high school in Kihei, Hawaii. It is a part of the Hawaii Department of Education.

The mascot is the manta ray.

It was the first school district-operated public high school to be established in the South Maui region.

== History ==
Planning had occurred during the 2010s. The Hawaii Land Use Commission stated that HIDOE would have to make an overpass or underpass to facilitate travel to the school, but this had not been done, and so the school planning had not been able to move forward.

The school first began operations in 2022 with 9th grade students only, using temporary facilities at Lokelani Intermediate School. In January 2023, enrollment was 34. The permanent school building had a cost of $245 million and had a planned capacity of 1,600. That building opened in 2023, with 139 students attending. By then, the school had grades 9 and 10.

== Athletics ==
As of 2023 the school did not have American football. Some students in the Kihei area chose to remain at Maui High School as they wanted to play American football.
