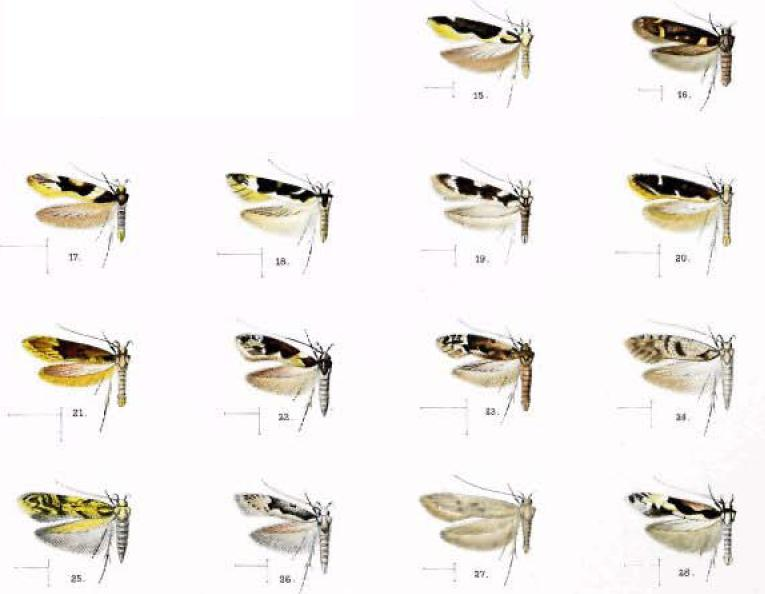
- Illustrations in Fauna Hawaiiensis: 15. Hyposmocoma nebulifera, 16. Hyposmocoma torquata, 17. Hyposmocoma notabilis, 18. Hyposmocoma lebetella, 19. Hyposmocoma tenuipalpis, 20. Hyposmocoma commensella, 21. Hyposmocoma leporella, 22. Hyposmocoma abjecta, 23. Hyposmocoma blackburnii, 24. Hyposmocoma cupreomaculata, 25. Hyposmocoma progressa, 26. Hyposmocoma domicolens, 27. Hyposmocoma suffusa, 28. Hyposmocoma lupella

Scientific classification
- Domain: Eukaryota
- Kingdom: Animalia
- Phylum: Arthropoda
- Class: Insecta
- Order: Lepidoptera
- Family: Cosmopterigidae
- Genus: Hyposmocoma
- Species: H. commensella

Binomial name
- Hyposmocoma commensella Walsingham, 1907

= Hyposmocoma commensella =

Species of moth

Hyposmocoma commensella is a species of moth of the family Cosmopterigidae. It was first described by Lord Walsingham in 1907. It is endemic to the island of Hawaii. The type locality is Kīlauea.
