= War Memorial Stadium (Hawaii) =

American football stadium in Wailuku, Hawaii

- Interactive map of War Memorial Stadium
- Full name: War Memorial Football Stadium
- Location: Wailuku, Hawaii
- Coordinates: 20°53′33.97″N 156°29′19.68″W
- Capacity: 7,000 in 1969; 23,000 at present
- Surface: grass

Construction
- Opened: 1969

Tenants
- Maui Interscholastic League (HHSAA); Hula Bowl (1998–2005)

War Memorial Stadium is a stadium located in Wailuku, Hawaii, that opened in 1969 and holds 23,000 people. It is primarily used for American football, and from 1998 through 2005 was the venue for the Hula Bowl, a college football all-star game. When the stadium originally opened in 1969 it held fewer than 7,000 people. It was expanded due to the efforts of the then-mayor of Maui, Linda Lingle, to host the Hula Bowl.

War Memorial Stadium is also home to the Maui Interscholastic League (MIL) High School Football association and soccer matches are played in the stadium.

War Memorial Stadium is also equipped with a state of the art 440 yard track, long jump, triple jump, high jump, and pole vaulting pits. In 1972, the stadium was the site of the first State High School Track and Field Championships held outside of Honolulu, chosen in part because of the new state of the art rubberized asphalt surface.

The football field has a grass surface. Plans to replace the grass with artificial turf were abandoned in 2014 when bids came in 50% above the expected $1 million.

The only regular-season college football game to take place on Maui occurred on September 8, 2001, when the University of Hawaii Warriors defeated the visiting Montana Grizzlies 30–12 in front of a crowd of 12,863.

== War Memorial Stadium Complex ==
The War Memorial Stadium Complex includes 1,500 plus seat Maehara Stadium adjacent to War Memorial Stadium. It is home to the Maui Interscholastic League Baseball and American Legion Games.

The complex also houses training facilities for H. P. Baldwin High School, additional soccer fields, softball fields, Soichi Sakamoto Pool and 2,000+ seat War Memorial Gymnasium. The complex was dedicated in 1965 to honor the Veterans of Maui County (comprising the Islands of Maui, Moloka'i and Lana'i) who gave their lives in service of their country.

The stadium complex is located on the windward side of the island between the towns of Kahului and the county seat Wailuku, on the Valley Isle of Maui and is adjacent to H. P. Baldwin High School.
