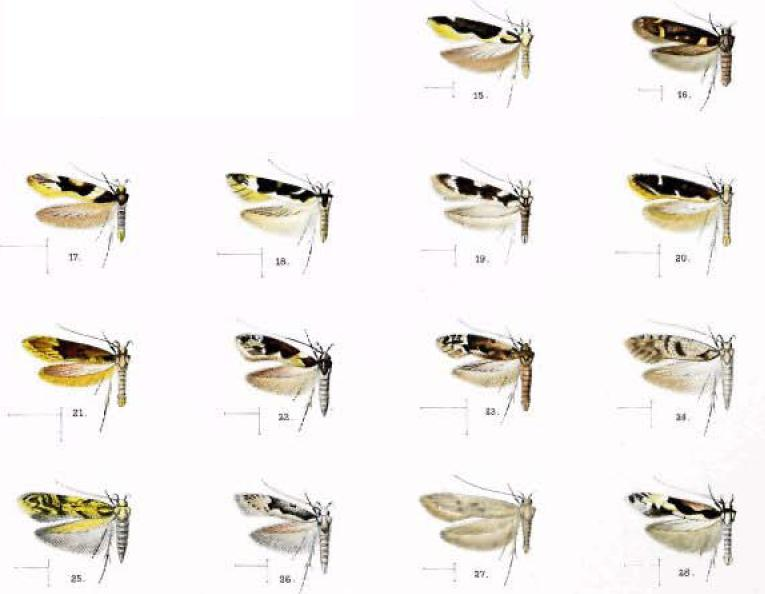
- Illustrations in Fauna Hawaiiensis: 15. Hyposmocoma nebulifera, 16. Hyposmocoma torquata, 17. Hyposmocoma notabilis, 18. Hyposmocoma lebetella, 19. Hyposmocoma tenuipalpis, 20. Hyposmocoma commensella, 21. Hyposmocoma leporella, 22. Hyposmocoma abjecta, 23. Hyposmocoma blackburnii, 24. Hyposmocoma cupreomaculata, 25. Hyposmocoma progressa, 26. Hyposmocoma domicolens, 27. Hyposmocoma suffusa, 28. Hyposmocoma lupella

Scientific classification
- Domain: Eukaryota
- Kingdom: Animalia
- Phylum: Arthropoda
- Class: Insecta
- Order: Lepidoptera
- Family: Cosmopterigidae
- Genus: Hyposmocoma
- Species: H. leporella

Binomial name
- Hyposmocoma leporella Walsingham, 1907

= Hyposmocoma leporella =

Species of moth

Hyposmocoma leporella is a species of moth of the family Cosmopterigidae. It was first described by Lord Walsingham in 1907. It is endemic to the Hawaiian island of Kauai.
