= Pukalani, Hawaii =

- Census-designated place
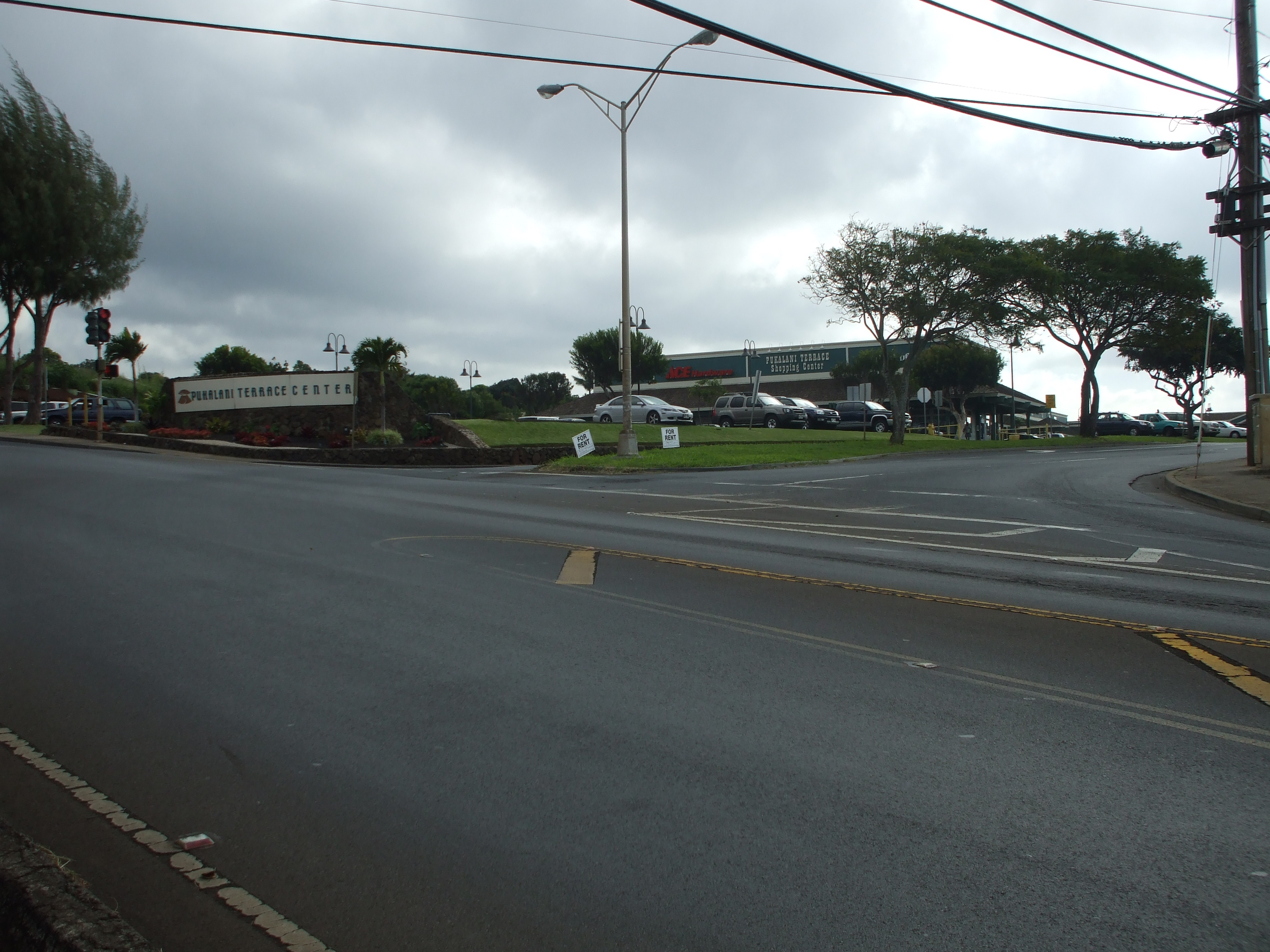
- Intersection of Old Haleakala Highway and Pukalani Street in Pukalani

- Location in Maui County and the state of Hawaii
- Coordinates: 20°50′24″N 156°20′38″W
- Country: United States
- State: Hawaii
- County: Maui

Area
  - Total: 3.77 sq mi (9.77 km^{2})
  - Land: 3.77 sq mi (9.77 km^{2})
  - Water: 0 sq mi (0.00 km^{2})
- Elevation: 1,526 ft (465 m)

Population (2020)
  - Total: 8,299
  - Density: 2,199.4/sq mi (849.18/km^{2})
- Time zone: UTC-10 (Hawaii-Aleutian)
- ZIP code: 96788
- Area code: 808
- FIPS code: 15-65900
- GNIS feature ID: 0363512

Pukalani is a census-designated place (CDP) in Maui County, Hawaiʻi, United States. The population was 8,299 at the 2020 census. The western volcano-slope region of Haleakalā, including nearby Makawao and Kula, is referred to as Upcountry Maui by locals, and is one of the four major population centers on Maui (the other three being Kahului, Lahaina and Kīhei, all of which are at sea level).

== Geography ==
Pukalani is located at 20°50′24″N 156°20′38″W (20.840039, -156.343808).

According to the United States Census Bureau, the CDP has a total area of 4.3 square miles (11.1 km^{2}), all of it land.

Pukalani (pronounced Poo-cah-lah-nee) in Hawaiian means "window of heaven". Clouds form above and below the community on Haleakalā, leaving Pukalani sunny most of the time. With cool and often brisk temperatures. Pukalani is one of the few places besides Haleakala and Kula that one can view the northern, western, and eastern sides of Maui.

== Demographics ==
Historical population
Census	Pop.	Note	%±
2020	8,299		—
U.S. Decennial Census

=== 2020 census ===
As of the 2020 census, Pukalani had a population of 8,299. The median age was 43.2 years. 21.5% of residents were under the age of 18 and 20.2% of residents were 65 years of age or older. For every 100 females there were 96.6 males, and for every 100 females age 18 and over there were 94.5 males age 18 and over.

97.9% of residents lived in urban areas, while 2.1% lived in rural areas.

There were 2,952 households in Pukalani, of which 31.8% had children under the age of 18 living in them. Of all households, 48.8% were married-couple households, 17.5% were households with a male householder and no spouse or partner present, and 24.7% were households with a female householder and no spouse or partner present. About 21.9% of all households were made up of individuals and 9.1% had someone living alone who was 65 years of age or older.

There were 3,099 housing units, of which 4.7% were vacant. The homeowner vacancy rate was 1.0% and the rental vacancy rate was 1.3%.

Racial composition as of the 2020 census
Race	Number	Percent
White	2,805	33.8%
Black or African American	52	0.6%
American Indian and Alaska Native	32	0.4%
Asian	1,706	20.6%
Native Hawaiian and Other Pacific Islander	747	9.0%
Some other race	139	1.7%
Two or more races	2,818	34.0%
Hispanic or Latino (of any race)	989	11.9%

=== 2000 census ===
As of the census of 2000, there were 7,379 people, 2,439 households, and 1,904 families residing in the CDP. The population density was 1,671.1 inhabitants per square mile (645.2/km^{2}). There were 2,522 housing units at an average density of 571.1 per square mile (220.5/km^{2}). The racial makeup of the CDP was 33.97% White, 0.41% African American, 0.23% Native American, 28.04% Asian, 7.38% Pacific Islander, 1.00% from other races, and 28.97% from two or more races. Hispanic or Latino of any race were 9.23% of the population.

There were 2,439 households, out of which 40.6% had children under the age of 18 living with them, 59.4% were married couples living together, 12.8% had a female householder with no husband present, and 21.9% were non-families. 14.5% of all households were made up of individuals, and 3.9% had someone living alone who was 65 years of age or older. The average household size was 3.03 and the average family size was 3.31.

In the CDP the population was spread out, with 28.0% under the age of 18, 6.9% from 18 to 24, 29.7% from 25 to 44, 25.5% from 45 to 64, and 9.9% who were 65 years of age or older. The median age was 37 years. For every 100 females, there were 98.1 males. For every 100 females age 18 and over, there were 96.0 males.

The median income for a household in the CDP was $62,778, and the median income for a family was $65,087. Males had a median income of $39,128 versus $29,107 for females. The per capita income for the CDP was $23,662. About 4.7% of families and 6.4% of the population were below the poverty line, including 8.4% of those under age 18 and 6.0% of those age 65 or over.

== Education ==
The statewide school district of Hawaii is the Hawaii Department of Education. Pukalani has a public high school, King Kekaulike High School, which opened its doors in 1995 to its first freshman class.

Pukalani is also home to Kamehameha Schools Maui and the Carden Academy, both private schools.
