= Dorothy Natsui =

American psychiatrist

- Born: Shimeno Natsui; April 28, 1909; Maui, Hawaii, U.S.
- Died: July 4, 2005 (age 96); Honolulu, Hawaii, U.S.
- Other names: Dorothy S. Lafon
- Occupation: Psychiatrist

Dorothy Shimeno Natsui Lafon (April 28, 1909 – July 4, 2005) was an American psychiatrist and public health official in Hawaii.

== Early life and education ==
Natsui was born in Kahului, Maui, Hawaii, the daughter of Harukichi Natsui and Moto Maeda Natsui. Both of her parents were born in Japan. She visited Japan in the summer of 1927, with other Hawaii-born teenagers of Japanese parentage. She attended Maui High School, the University of Hawaii, and the University of Illinois. She earned her bachelor's degree and her medical degree at Loyola University Chicago, where she was one of four women in her graduating class. After World War II, she studied electroencephalography at Bellevue, Hospital, and child psychiatry at Johns Hopkins University.

== Career ==
Natsui served an internship at a hospital in Janesville, Wisconsin, and held a residency at Queen's Hospital in Honolulu. She opened an office in Kahului in early 1938, and in Wailuku later that year, She was an active member of the Maui Japanese Civic Association in 1939. In 1940 she joined the University Japanese Club in Honolulu. She presented a paper at the Honolulu County Medical Society meeting in October 1941.

She was a child psychiatrist with the Hawaii Board of Health's Bureau of Mental Hygiene from 1947 to 1949. In 1966, she was named director of the child guidance outpatient clinic at Kauikeolani Children's Hospital. She was sometimes called upon to examine criminal defendants. She lectured on mental health topics, such as sexuality, stress and relaxation, and fear, to women's groups and professional organizations.

== Publications ==
- "Residues of Early Father-Child Conflict" (1970, with Clyde L. Rousey)

== Personal life ==
Natsui married psychologist Fred Earl La Fon in 1954; he died in 1963. She died in 2005, at the age of 96, in Honolulu. Her gravesite is with her husband's, in the National Memorial Cemetery of the Pacific.
