= St. Anthony School (Wailuku, Hawaii) =

St. Anthony's School of Maui
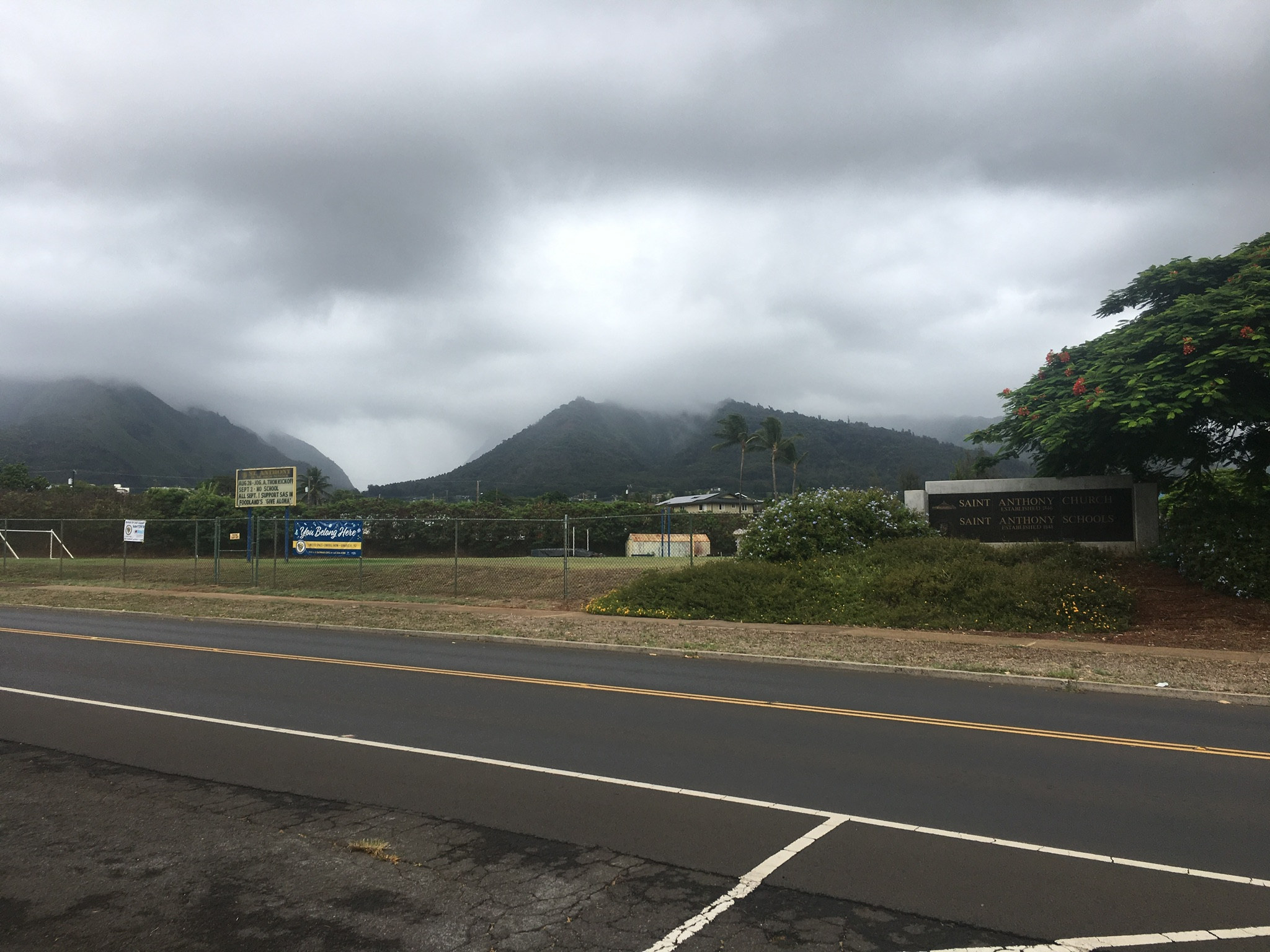
- St. Anthony High School, September 2019

Location
- 1618 Lower Main Street; Wailuku, (Maui County), Hawaiʻi 96793; United States; 20°53′33″N 156°29′46″W

Information
- Type: Private
- Motto: Fortes in Unitate (Strength in Unity)
- Religious affiliation: Roman Catholic
- Established: 1848; 178 years ago
- Oversight: Roman Catholic Diocese of Honolulu
- Head of school: David Kenney
- Grades: K–12
- Gender: Coeducational
- Colors: Navy Blue and Gold
- Athletics conference: Maui Interscholastic League
- Mascot: Trojans
- Accreditation: Western Association of Schools and Colleges
- Yearbook: The Brocken
- Website: www.sasmaui.org

St. Anthony School of Maui is a private, Roman Catholic high school in Wailuku, Hawaii in the Roman Catholic Diocese of Honolulu.

== History ==
St. Anthony was established as a boys school in 1848 by the Sacred Heart Fathers. The Marianists (Society of Mary) took over in 1883. The Sisters of St. Francis of Syracuse established a girls School in 1884. The Girls and Boys schools merged in 1968.

== St. Anthony Junior Senior High School Band ==
St. Anthony has symphonic, concert, marching/pep, jazz and ukulele bands. The musicians traveled to New York in April 2013 to perform in the National Band and Orchestra Festival at Carnegie Hall. The band recently took their second trip to Carnegie Hall. They also traveled to Washington D.C. to perform in the Festival of States.

== Notable alumni ==
- Anthony T. Kaho'ohanohano, 1949, U.S. Army Pfc. Medal of Honor (Korea)
- Shane Victorino, outfielder for the Boston Red Sox
