= Maui High School =

Location
- 660 South Lono Avenue; Kahului, Hawaii 96732; United States; 20.875°N 156.473°W

Information
- Type: Public, Co-educational
- Motto: "College and Career Ready!"
- Established: 1913
- School district: Maui District
- Principal: Mr. Ty Ogasawara
- Faculty: 122.00 (FTE)
- Grades: 9-12
- Enrollment: 1,999 (2022-23)
- Student to teacher ratio: 16.39
- Campus: Suburban
- Colors: Royal Blue and White
- Athletics: Maui Interscholastic League
- Mascot: Sabers
- Rival: Henry Perrine Baldwin High School
- Accreditation: Western Association of Schools and Colleges
- Website: mauihigh.org

Maui High School is a public high school founded in 1913 in Hamakuapoko, a sugarcane plantation town on the island of Maui in Hawaii. In 1972, the school moved to its new location in Kahului, Hawaii.

== Old Maui High School ==
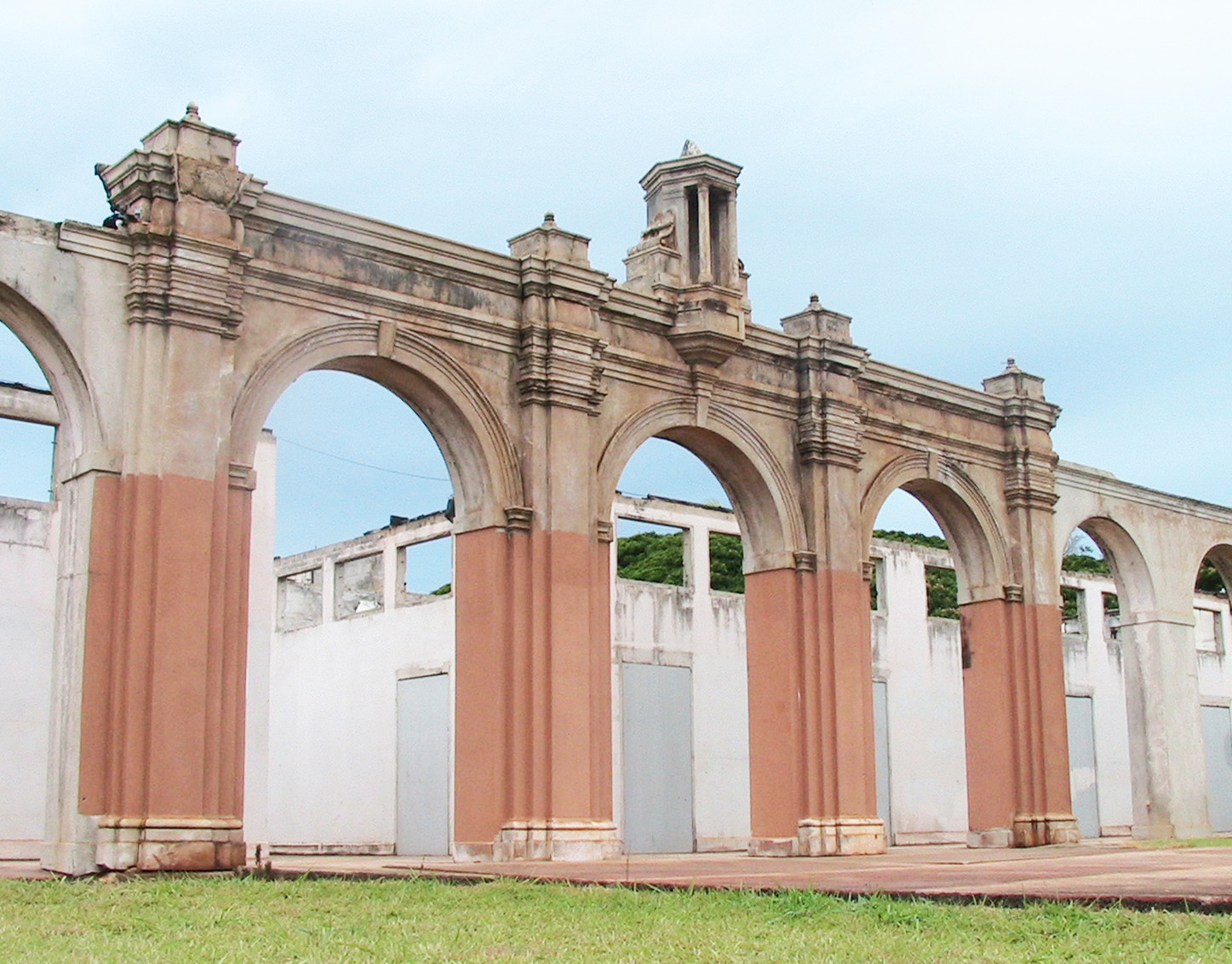
Façade of old high school administration building, designed by C. W. Dickey (1921).

The original school was founded in 1913. Early students arrived to school via horse and buggy or the now defunct Kahului Railroad. The old school site, at 20°54′56″N 156°20′55″W, includes the campus's centerpiece administration building, built in 1921 and designed by architect Charles William Dickey, which fell into disrepair. The concrete structure was built after the Paia lime plant was converted to a cement factory during WWI. The site was nominated to the State and National Register of Historic Places. Work to restore the campus was started in 2004 by community organizations including the Friends of Old Maui High and Community Work Day. The campus boasts the sculptures A Path Through the Trees by Satoru Abe, Growing by Toshiko Takaezu, and Carolina by Thomas Woodruff.

== Today's Maui High ==
The new campus was built in 1972 at 660 South Lono Avenue in Kahului. In 2009, Maui High School had an approximate enrollment of 1816 students, and 123 faculty. Students from the 8th grade class of Maui Waena Intermediate School and Lokelani Intermediate School are scheduled to attend Maui High if they reside in Kihei or Kahului. The school mascot is the sabers, its colors are royal blue and white, and it fields a notable 99 member marching band and color guard.

Up until the opening of Kulanihakoi High School in Kihei in 2022, South Maui students typically went to Maui High.

== Athletics ==
Maui High School has a variety of athletic opportunities for its students, including basketball, cheerleading, judo, paddling, track and field, swimming and diving, tennis, golf, cross country, wrestling, riflery, football, baseball, soccer, women's water polo, and softball. In order to participate in athletic opportunities, a student must maintain a grade-point average of 2.5 throughout a sport's season. On April 29, 2017, Maui High School won the HHSAA Division 1 Baseball Championship by beating Waiakea 6 to 1, thereby bringing the title back to Maui for the first time in 35 years.

In 2023, some Kihei area students who wanted to play American football continued to attend Maui High, as Kulanihakoi High did not yet have American football.

=== HHSAA Championships ===
- 1995 Track & Field - Boys
- 1994 Boys Golf
- 1993 Boys Golf
- 1988 Boys Golf
- 1987 Track & Field - Boys
- 1982 Baseball
- 1977 Boys Golf
- 2017 Baseball
- 2018 Boys Cross Country

In 2008 Maui High won the Maui Interscholastic League Championships in Cross-Country.

== Academics ==
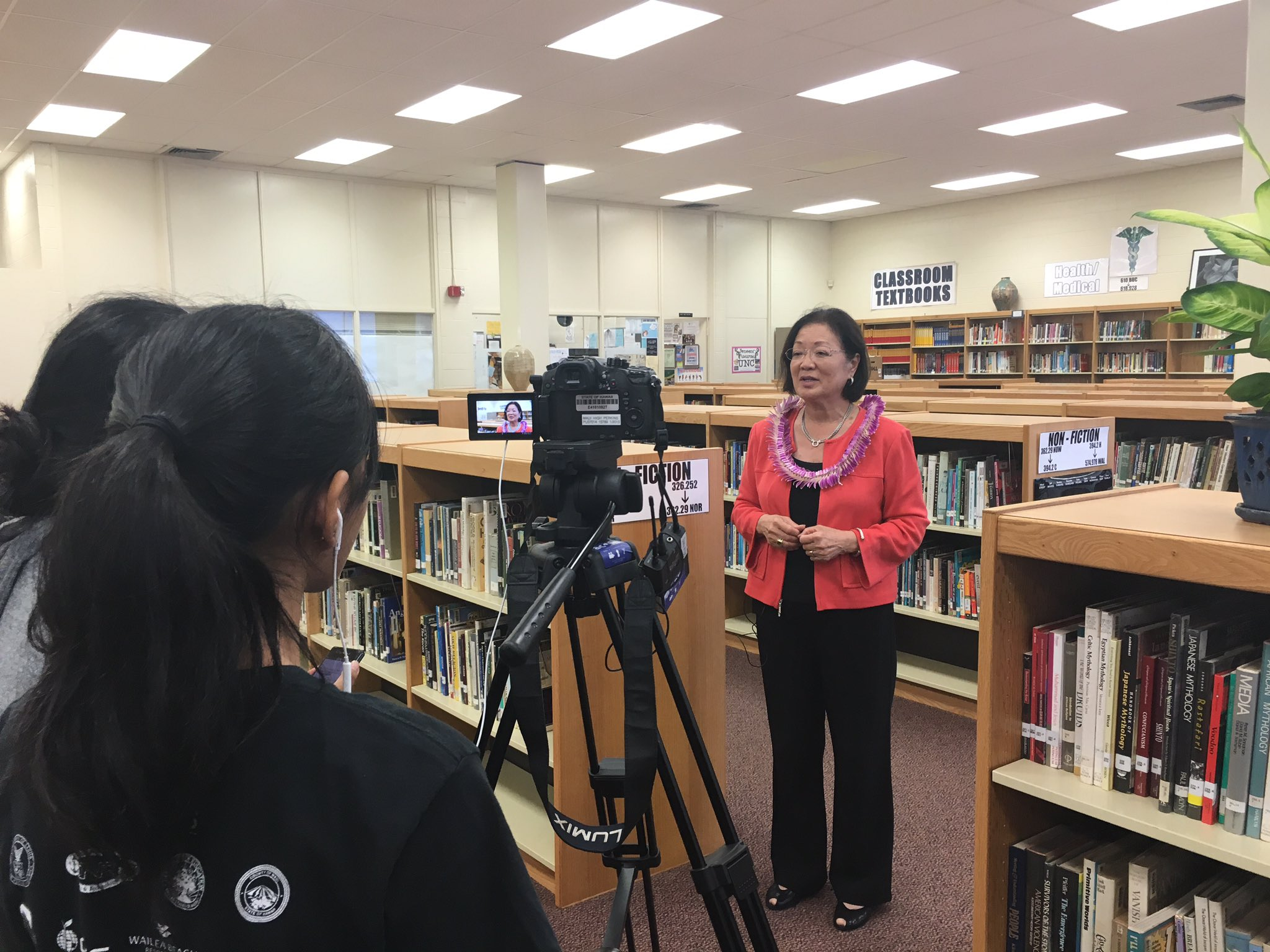
U.S. Senator Mazie Hirono speaking at Maui High School's library in 2016

Since 1990, Maui High School has had a large boom in academic successes. The Sabers remain one of only two public high schools in Hawaii to win the regional competition of the National Science Bowl (a total of four times) and one of only two public schools in Hawaii to win the regional National Ocean Sciences Bowl competitions (a total of four times).

In two years, Maui High ranked fifth then sixth at the national competition of the National Ocean Sciences Bowl - a feat unmatched by any Hawaii school until 2010 by the team from Punahou school (which finished fifth).

Maui High has also had great success in sending students to the national olympiads of various subjects. A number of three and four year qualifiers for the National Chemistry Olympiad and National Physics Olympiad have passed through the school.

The school has also produced a number of finalists in the Intel International Science and Engineering Fair. In recent years, 3rd- and 4th-place awards have been given to Maui High finalists in the physics category, in addition to one student receiving an all-expense-paid trip to the European Organization for Nuclear Research.

The school robotics team (2443, The Blue Thunder) is another point of pride for the school. Created in 2006, the team has currently participated in three seasons with the FIRST Robotics Competition, as well as with the VEX Robotics Competition. Two separate VEX teams flying the 2443 banner qualified for the 2010 Dallas World Championships, and the 2443 FIRST team competed in the Atlanta, Georgia FIRST Championship in 2009.

Since 2010, Maui High has been using Senior Projects as a graduation requirement.

== Band ==
With 99 members in the 2023–2024 school year, the Saber Marching Band & Color Guard is Maui High School's largest student-body organization. The Sabers have performed at Disneyland, and the Tournament of Roses Parade in 2015. In November 2017, the Maui High School marching band and color guard performed at the Bands of America Grand National Championship at Lucas Oil Stadium in Indianapolis, Indiana.

== Notable alumni ==
- Alan Arakawa, Maui County mayor
- Chai Cortez, professional soccer player
- Elmer Cravalho, Maui County mayor and member of the Hawaii House of Representatives
- Destin Daniel Cretton, American Filmmaker
- Baldwin Domingo, member of the New Hampshire House of Representatives
- Myra English, musician
- Keone Kapisi, soccer player
- Gilbert Keith-Agaran, member of both chambers of the Hawaii State Legislature
- Rachel Kondo, American writer and television producer
- Patsy Mink, first Asian-American woman elected to U.S. House of Representatives
- Keo Nakama, All American freestyle swimmer at Ohio State, world record holder for the mile, first man to swim the Molokai Channel, and member of Hawaii State House of Representatives
- Dorothy Natsui, psychiatrist
- Zach Scott, former professional player of association football (soccer) for Seattle Sounders FC
- Hannibal Tavares, Maui County mayor
- Shan S. Tsutsui, former lieutenant governor of Hawaii; former president of the Hawaii Senate
- Nadao Yoshinaga, Attorney and politician
