= Hoʻolehua, Hawaii =

Unincorporated community in Hawaii, United States

- Unincorporated community
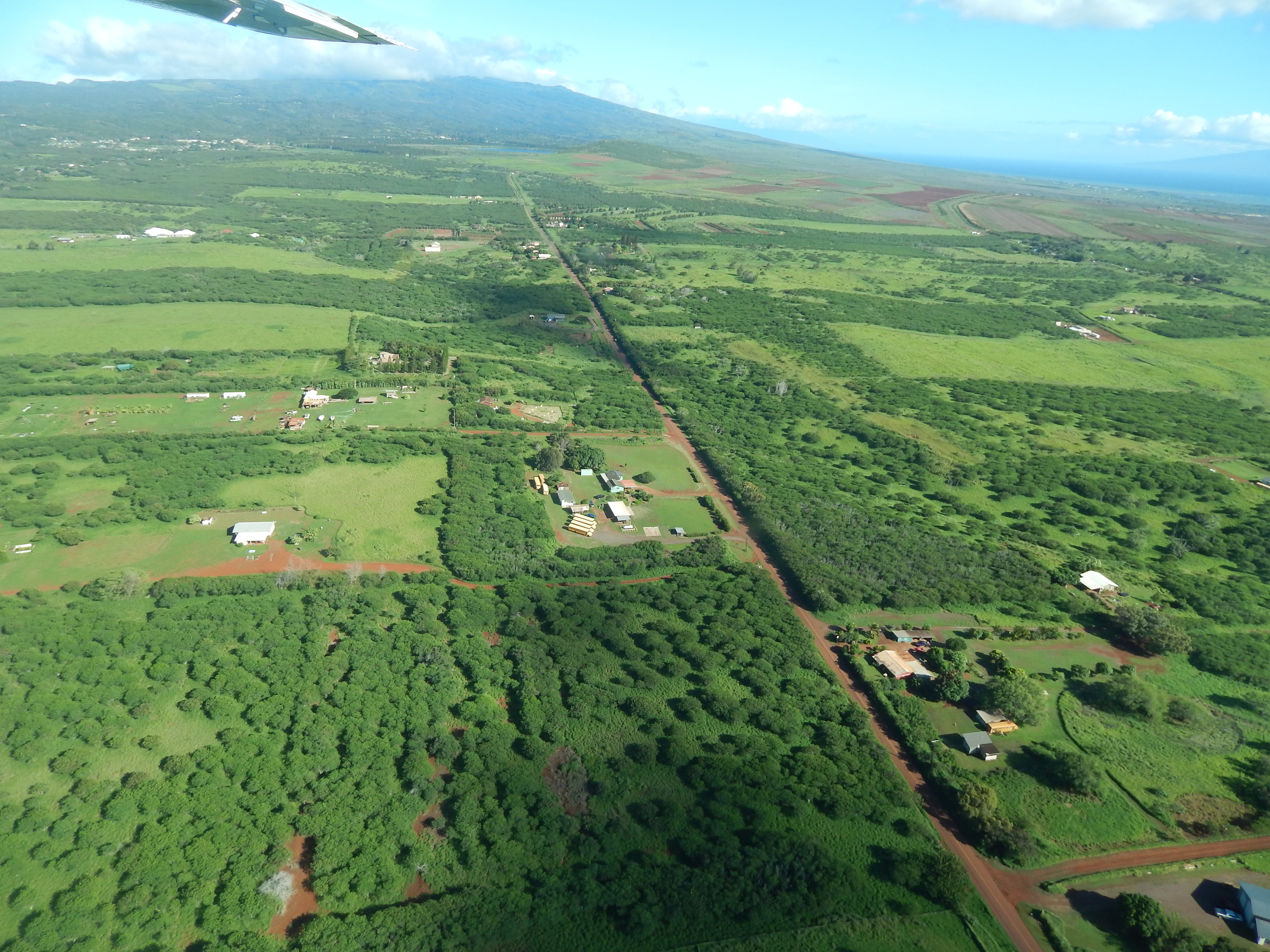
- Aerial view

- Location in Hawaii
- Coordinates: 21°10′16″N 157°4′17″W
- Country: United States
- State: Hawaii
- County: Maui
- Elevation: 620 ft (190 m)
- Time zone: UTC−10 (Hawaii–Aleutian)
- ZIP codes: 96729
- GNIS feature ID: 359414

Hoʻolehua (pronounced [hoʔoleˈhuwə], also spelled Hoolehua) is an unincorporated community and Hawaiian home land on the island of Molokaʻi in Maui County, Hawaii, United States. It lies just off Hawaii Route 460, next to the Molokai Airport. Its elevation is 620 feet (189 m). Because the community's name has been spelled multiple ways, the Board on Geographic Names officially designated it "Hoʻolehua" in 2003.

Hoolehua has a post office with the ZIP code 96729. Since 1991 the post office's Post-a-Nut program provides free coconuts to mail; a sender writes the destination address on the shell, and pays for postage. About 3000 coconuts are mailed around the world each year.
