= Makawao, Hawaii =

- Census-designated place
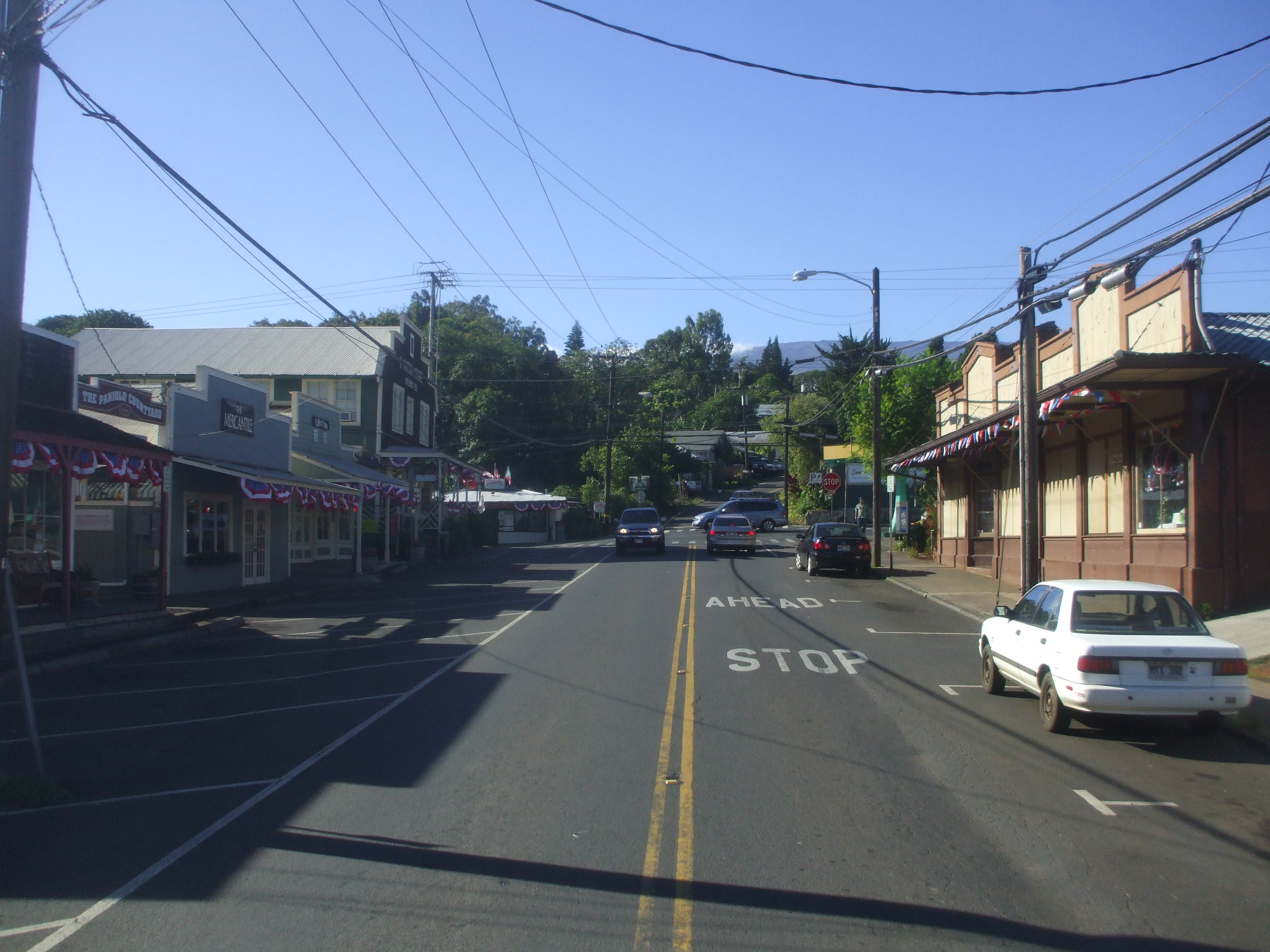
- Looking up on Baldwin Avenue towards the Baldwin Ave/Makawao Ave/Olinda Road intersection

- Location in Maui County and the state of Hawaii
- Coordinates: 20°51′13″N 156°19′1″W
- Country: United States
- State: Hawaii
- County: Maui

Area
  - Total: 3.54 sq mi (9.18 km^{2})
  - Land: 3.54 sq mi (9.18 km^{2})
  - Water: 0 sq mi (0.00 km^{2})
- Elevation: 1,578 ft (481 m)

Population (2020)
  - Total: 7,297
  - Density: 2,057.8/sq mi (794.54/km^{2})
- Time zone: UTC-10 (Hawaii-Aleutian)
- ZIP code: 96768
- Area code: 808
- FIPS code: 15-48050
- GNIS feature ID: 0362090

Makawao is a census-designated place (CDP) in Maui County, Hawaiʻi, United States. The population was 7,297 at the 2020 census. Located on the rural northwest slope of Haleakalā, the community is known for being the hub of Upcountry Maui, a part of the island dominated by mostly agriculture and ranch land. Makawao Forest Reserve is to the east-northeast.

== Geography ==
Makawao is located at 20°51′13″N 156°19′1″W (20.853657, -156.316951).

According to the United States Census Bureau, the CDP has a total area of 3.5 square miles (9.0 km^{2}), all of it land.

== Demographics ==
Historical population
Census	Pop.	Note	%±
2000	6,327		—
2010	7,184		13.5%
2020	7,297		1.6%
U.S. Decennial Census

=== 2020 census ===
As of the 2020 census, Makawao had a population of 7,297. The median age was 40.6 years. 22.4% of residents were under the age of 18 and 17.8% of residents were 65 years of age or older. For every 100 females there were 95.3 males, and for every 100 females age 18 and over there were 92.8 males age 18 and over.

94.7% of residents lived in urban areas, while 5.3% lived in rural areas.

There were 2,572 households in Makawao, of which 32.8% had children under the age of 18 living in them. Of all households, 46.2% were married-couple households, 18.1% were households with a male householder and no spouse or partner present, and 26.5% were households with a female householder and no spouse or partner present. About 24.5% of all households were made up of individuals and 10.3% had someone living alone who was 65 years of age or older.

There were 2,690 housing units, of which 4.4% were vacant. The homeowner vacancy rate was 0.2% and the rental vacancy rate was 3.4%.

Racial composition as of the 2020 census
Race	Number	Percent
White	2,680	36.7%
Black or African American	17	0.2%
American Indian and Alaska Native	38	0.5%
Asian	1,065	14.6%
Native Hawaiian and Other Pacific Islander	835	11.4%
Some other race	125	1.7%
Two or more races	2,537	34.8%
Hispanic or Latino (of any race)	1,044	14.3%

=== 2000 census ===
At the 2000 census, there were 6,327 people, 2,151 households, and 1,565 families in the CDP. The population density was 1,353.8 inhabitants per square mile (522.7/km^{2}). There were 2,222 housing units at an average density of 475.5 per square mile (183.6/km^{2}). The racial makeup of the CDP was 40.54% White, 0.32% African American, 0.55% Native American, 17.04% Asian, 8.74% Pacific Islander, 1.56% from other races, and 31.25% from two or more races. Hispanic or Latino of any race were 11.93% of the population.

Of the 2,151 households 41.4% had children under the age of 18 living with them, 51.7% were married couples living together, 14.8% had a female householder with no husband present, and 27.2% were non-families. 17.6% of households were one person and 4.6% were one person aged 65 or older. The average household size was 2.94 and the average family size was 3.34.

The age distribution was 29.6% under the age of 18, 7.9% from 18 to 24, 32.0% from 25 to 44, 23.4% from 45 to 64, and 7.2% 65 or older. The median age was 35 years. For every 100 females, there were 99.5 males. For every 100 females age 18 and over, there were 93.2 males.

The median household income was $46,681 and the median family income was $50,145. Males had a median income of $32,917 versus $26,955 for females. The per capita income for the CDP was $18,776. About 7.4% of families and 9.6% of the population were below the poverty line, including 10.7% of those under age 18 and 9.7% of those age 65 or over.

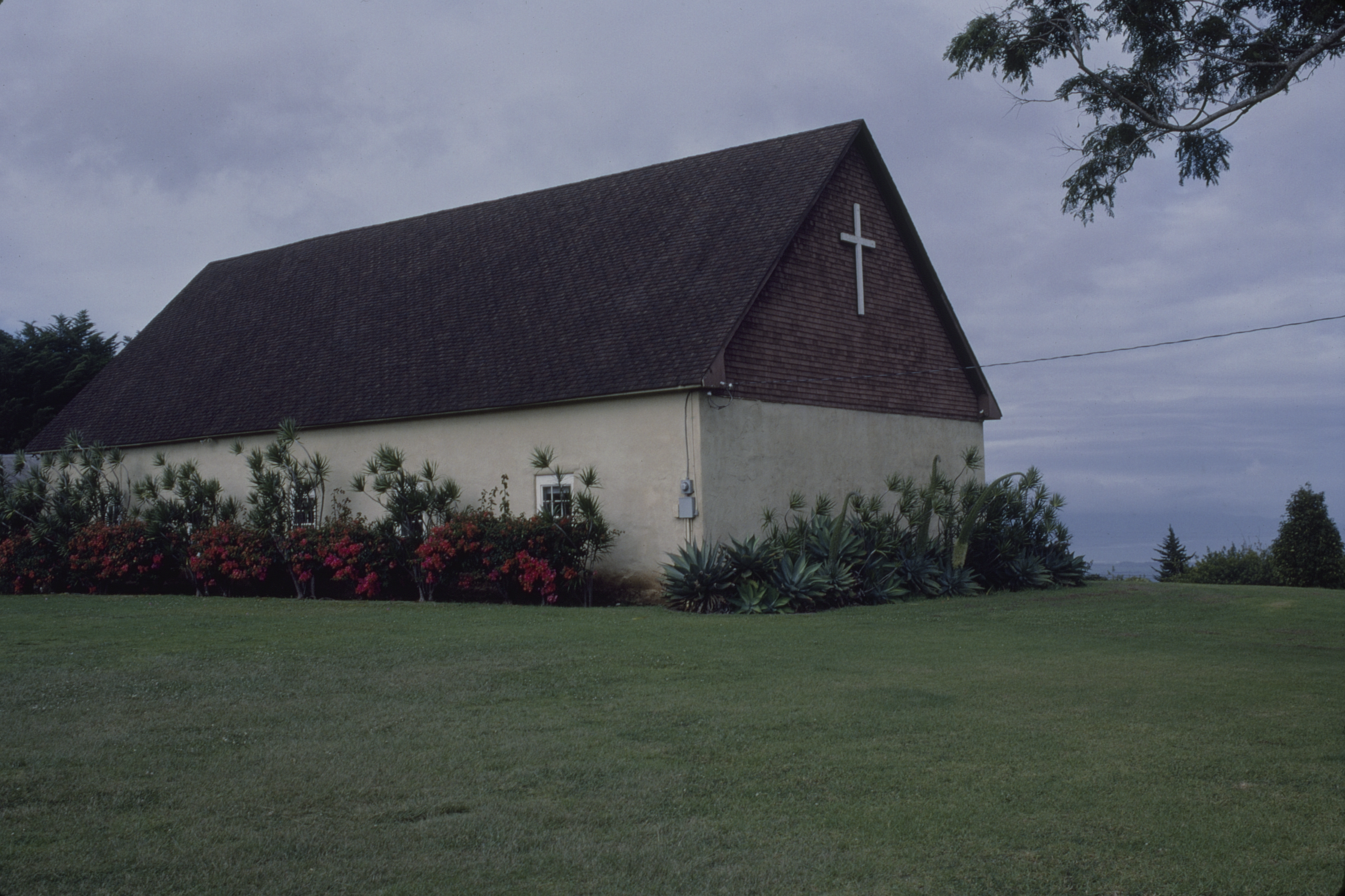
Exterior of Po'okela Church in Makawao. Photograph by Alan Gowans. Department of Image Collections, National Gallery of Art Library.

== Education ==
The statewide school district of Hawaii is the Hawaii State Department of Education. Makawao Elementary School is in Makawao.

The Hawaii State Public Library System operates the Makawao Public Library.

Makawao is home to the Pacific Science Institute.
