= 33rd Hawaii State Legislature =

American legislative session

←	32nd	34th	→
- The Great Seal of the State of Hawaii

Overview
- Legislative body: Hawaii State Legislature
- Jurisdiction: Hawaii
- Election: 2024 Hawaii House of Representatives election 2024 Hawaii Senate election

Senate
- Members: 25
- President: Ron Kouchi (D)
- Vice President: Michelle Kidani(D)
- Majority Leader: Dru Kanuha (D)
- Minority Leader: Brenton Awa (R)
- Party control: (Democratic)

House of Representatives
- Members: 51
- Speaker: Nadine Nakamura (D)
- Vice Speaker: Linda Ichiyama (D)
- Minority Leader: Lauren Matsumoto (R)
- Party control: (Democratic)

The Thirty-Third Hawaii State Legislature is a meeting of the State Legislature of the U.S. state of Hawaii, composed of the Hawaii House of Representatives and the Hawaii Senate.

== Senate ==
↓
22	3
Democratic	Rep

Affiliation	Party (Shading indicates majority caucus)		Total	
Affiliation	Democratic	Republican	Total	Vacant
End of previous legislature (2024)	23	2	25	0
Begin (2025)	22	3	25	0
Latest voting share	92%	8%		

=== Leadership ===
Position	Name	Party	District
President of the Senate	Ron Kouchi	Democratic	8
Majority Leader	Dru Kanuha	Democratic	3
Minority Leader	Brenton Awa	Republican	23

=== Officers ===
Position	Name
Chief Clerk	Carol T. Taniguchi
Assistant Chief Clerk	Ainoa A. Naniole
Sergeant-at-Arms	Bienvenido C. Villaflor
Assistant Sergeant-at-Arms	C.M. Park Kaleiwahea

=== List of members ===
District	Name	Party	County(ies)	Areas represented	First elected
1	Lorraine Inouye	Dem	Hawaiʻi	Hilo, Pauka‘a, Papaikou, Pepe‘ekeo	2014 (Note: Previously served in Senate from 1998 to 2008)
2	Joy San Buenaventura	Dem	Hawaiʻi	Puna	2020 (Note: Previously served in House from 2014 to 2020)
3	Dru Kanuha	Dem	Hawaiʻi	Kona, Kaʻū, Volcano	2018
4	Tim Richards III	Dem	Hawaiʻi	Hilo, Hāmākua, Kohala, Waimea, Waikōloa, Kona	2022
5	Troy Hashimoto (Note: Democrat Gilbert Keith-Agaran resigned on October 31, 2023. State representative Troy Hashimoto was appointed on November 9, 2023 to fill the seat until a special election is held in November 2024.)	Dem	Maui	Wailuku, Waiheʻe, Kahului, Mauka, Wai'ehu	2023 (Note: Senator was originally appointed) (Note: Previously served in House from 2018 to 2023)
6	Angus McKelvey	Dem	Maui	West and South Maui, Maalaea, Waikapu	2022 (Note: Previously served in House from 2006 to 2022)
7	Lynn DeCoite	Dem	Maui, Kalawao	Hāna, East and Upcountry Maui, Molokaʻi, Lānaʻi and Kahoʻolawe, Molokini	2021 (Note: Previously served in House from 2015 to 2021)
8	Ron Kouchi	Dem	Kauaʻi	Kauaʻi, Niʻihau	2010
9	Stanley Chang	Dem	Honolulu	Hawaiʻi Kai, ʻĀina Haina, Waiʻalae-Kāhala, Diamond Head, Kaimuki, Kapahulu	2016
10	Les Ihara Jr.	Dem	Honolulu	Kaimukī, Kapahulu, Pālolo, Maunalani Heights, St. Louis Heights, Mōʻiliʻili, Ala Wai mauka, Kapahulu, Moiliili, McCully	1994 (Note: Previously served in House from 1986 to 1994)
11	Carol Fukunaga	Dem	Honolulu	Mānoa, Makiki, Punchbowl, Papakōlea, Tantalus	2022 (Note: Previously served in House from 1979 to 1982, House from 1987 to 1992, and Senate from 1992 to 2012)
12	Sharon Moriwaki	Dem	Honolulu	Kakaʻako, Ala Moana, Waikīkī, McCully	2018
13	Karl Rhoads	Dem	Honolulu	Liliha, Pālama, Iwilei, Nuʻuanu, Pacific Heights, Pauoa, Downtown, Chinatown, Dowsett Heights, Pu'unui	2016 (Note: Previously served in House from 2006 to 2016)
14	Donna Mercado Kim (Note: Became President of the Senate on December 28, 2012, after Shan Tsutsui was appointed by Governor Neil Abercrombie to be Lieutenant Governor. Ousted as Senate President in unusual mid-year leadership reorganization on May 5, 2015. First Filipina, but second Filipino American, Hawaiʻi Senate President)	Dem	Honolulu	Moanalua, ʻAiea, Fort Shafter, Kalihi Valley, Red Hill, Kapalama	2000 (Note: Previously served in House from 1982 to 1985)
15	Glenn Wakai	Dem	Honolulu	Kalihi, Māpunapuna, Airport, Salt Lake, Āliamanu, Foster Village, Hickam, Pearl Harbor, Aiea, Pearl City	2010 (Note: Previously served in House from 2002 to 2010)
16	Brandon Elefante	Dem	Honolulu	Pearl City, Momilani, Pearlridge, ʻAiea, Royal Summit, ʻAiea Heights, Newtown, Waimalu, Hālawa, Pearl Harbor, Waiau, Pacific Palisades	2022
17	Donovan Dela Cruz	Dem	Honolulu	Mililani Town, Mililani Mauka, Waipi'o Acres, Launani Valley, Wahiawa, Whitmore Village	2010
18	Michelle Kidani	Dem	Honolulu	Mililani Town, Waipiʻo Gentry, Crestview, Waikele, Village Park, Royal Kunia	2008
19	Henry Aquino	Dem	Honolulu	Pearl City, Waipahu, West Loch Estates, Hono'ui'uli, Ho'opii	2022 (Note: Previously served in House from 2008 to 2022)
20	Kurt Fevella	Rep	Honolulu	ʻEwa Beach, Ocean Pointe, ʻEwa by Gentry, Iroquois Point, ʻEwa Village	2018
21	Mike Gabbard	Dem	Honolulu	Kalaeloa, Fernandez Village, ʻEwa, Kapolei, Makakilo,	2006
22	Samantha DeCorte	Rep	Honolulu	Honokai Hale, Ko 'Olina, Nanakuli, Maili, Waianae, Makaha, Makua	2024
23	Brenton Awa	Rep	Honolulu	Kane'ohe, Kahaluu thru Laie, Kahuku to Mokuleia, Schofield Barracks, Kunia Camp	2022
24	Jarrett Keohokalole	Dem	Honolulu	Kāneʻohe, Kailua	2018 (Note: Previously served in House from 2014 to 2018)
25	Chris Lee	Dem	Honolulu	Kailua, Waimānalo, Hawaiʻi Kai	2020 (Note: Previously served in House from 2008 to 2020)

== House of Representatives ==
=== Composition ===
This is a list of individuals serving in the Hawaii House of Representatives following the November 2024 election, as well as the body's leadership.

↓
41	10
Democratic	Republican

Affiliation	Party (Shading indicates majority caucus)		Total	
Affiliation	Democratic	Republican	Total	Vacant
End of previous legislature (2024)	45	6	51	0
Begin (2025)	42	9	51	0
Latest voting share	82.4%	17.6%		

=== Leadership ===
Office	Name	Party	District
Speaker	Nadine Nakamura	Democratic	15
Vice Speaker	Linda Ichiyama	Democratic	32
Majority Leader	Sean Quinlan	Democratic	47
Majority Floor Leader	Dee Morikawa	Democratic	17
Minority Leader	Lauren Matsumoto	Republican	38
Minority Floor Leader	Diamond Garcia	Republican	42
Assistant Minority Leader	David Alcos	Republican	41

=== Officers ===
Position	Name
Chief Clerk	Brian L. Takeshita
Assistant Chief Clerk	Rupert Juarez
Sergeant-at-Arms	Rod Tanonaka
Assistant Sergeant-at-Arms	Jade Villanueva

=== List of members ===
District	Representative	Party	County(ies)	Areas represented	First elected
1	Matthias Kusch (Note: Appointed to seat on August 30, 2024 by Governor Josh Green after the death of Mark Nakashima.)	Dem	Hawaiʻi	Hāmākua, portion of Hilo, Ka‘ūmana	2024 (Note: Representative was originally appointed)
2	Sue L. Keohokapu-Lee Loy	Dem	Hawaiʻi	Hilo	2024
3	Chris Toshiro Todd	Dem	Hawaiʻi	Portion of Hilo, Keaukaha, Orchidlands Estate, Ainaloa, Hawaiian Acres, Fern Acres, portions of Kurtistown and Keaʻau	2017
4	Greggor Ilagan	Dem	Hawaiʻi	Hawaiian Paradise Park, Hawaiian Beaches, Nānāwale Estates, Leilani Estates	2020
5	Jeanné Kapela	Dem	Hawaiʻi	Portions of Keaʻau and Kurtistown, Mountain View, Glenwood, Fern Forest, Volcano, Pāhala, Punalu‘u, Nā‘ālehu, Wai‘ōhinu, Hawaiian Ocean View, Ho‘okena	2020
6	Kirstin Kahaloa	Dem	Hawaiʻi	Hōnaunau, Nāpo‘opo‘o, Captain Cook, Kealakekua, Keauhou, Hōlualoa, Kailua-Kona	2022
7	Nicole Lowen	Dem	Hawaiʻi	Kailua-Kona, Honokōhau, Kalaoa, Pu‘uanahulu, Puakō, portion of Waikōloa	2012
8	David Tarnas	Dem	Hawaiʻi	Hawi, Hala‘ula, Waimea, Makahalau, Waiki‘i, Waikōloa, Kawaihae, and Māhukona	2018 (Note: Previously served in House from 1994 to 1998)
9	Justin Woodson	Dem	Maui	Kahului, Puʻunēnē, portion of Wailuku	2013
10	Tyson Miyake (Note: Appointed to seat on December 15, 2023 by Governor Josh Green after Troy Hashimoto was appointed to the Hawaii Senate.)	Dem	Maui	Portion of Waiehu, Paukukalo, Wailuku, Wailuku Heights, Waikapu	2023
11	Terez Amato	Dem	Maui	Portion of Māʻalaea, Kīhei, Keawakapu, Wailea, Mākena, Kanahena, Keone‘ō‘io	2022
12	Kyle Yamashita	Dem	Maui	Portion of Keāhua, Hāli‘imaile, Pukalani, Makawao, Pūlehu, Waiakoa, Kēōkea, and ‘Ulupalakua	2004
13	Mahina Poepoe	Dem	Maui, Kalawao	Molokaʻi, Lānaʻi, Kahoʻolawe, portion of Kahului, Ha‘ikū, Pe‘ahi, Huelo, Nāhiku, Hāna, Kīpahulu	2022
14	Elle Cochran (Note: Switched party affiliation to Republican on March 16, 2026.)	Rep	Maui	Kahakuloa, Waiheʻe, portions of Wai‘ehu and Māʻalaea, Olowalu, Lahaina, Lahainaluna, Kā‘anapali, Māhinahina Camp, Kahana, Honokahua	2022
15	Nadine Nakamura	Dem	Kauaʻi	Hā‘ena, Wainiha, Hanalei, Princeville, Kīlauea, Anahola, Keālia, Kāpa‘a, portion of Wailuā, Kawaihau	2016
16	Luke Evslin (Note: Appointed to seat on February 15, 2023 by Governor Josh Green after James Tokioka was appointed to join the governor's cabinet.)	Dem	Kauaʻi	Wailuā, Hanamāʻulu, Kapaia, Līhuʻe, Puhi, portion of ʻŌmaʻo	2023
17	Dee Morikawa	Dem	Kauaʻi	Niʻihau, portion of ʻŌmaʻo, Kōloa, Po‘ipū, Lāwa‘i, Kalāheo, ‘Ele‘ele, Hanapēpē, Kaawanui Village, Pākalā Village, Waimea, Kekaha	2010
18	Gene Ward	Rep	Honolulu	Portlock, Hawaiʻi Kai, Kalama Valley	2006 (Note: Previously served in House from 1990 to 1998)
19	Mark Hashem	Dem	Honolulu	Waiʻalae-Kāhala,ʻĀina Haina, Niu Valley, Kuli‘ou‘ou	2010
20	Tina Nakada Grandinetti	Dem	Honolulu	Leahi, Kāhala, Waiʻalae, Kaimukī, Kapahulu	2024
21	Jackson Sayama	Dem	Honolulu	St. Louis Heights, Pālolo Valley, Maunalani Heights, Wilhelmina Rise, Kaimukī	2020
22	Andrew Takuya Garrett	Dem	Honolulu	Mānoa	2022
23	Ikaika Olds	Dem	Honolulu	Mōʻiliʻili, McCully	2024
24	Adrian Tam	Dem	Honolulu	Waikīkī	2020
25	Kim Coco Iwamoto	Dem	Honolulu	Ala Moana, Kakaʻako, Downtown Honolulu	2024
26	Della Au Belatti	Dem	Honolulu	Makiki, Punchbowl	2006
27	Jenna Takenouchi	Dem	Honolulu	Pacific Heights, Nuʻuanu, Liliha	2022
28	Daniel Holt	Dem	Honolulu	Sand Island, Iwilei, Chinatown	2016
29	Ikaika Hussey	Dem	Honolulu	Kamehameha Heights, Kalihi Valley, portion of Kalihi	2024
30	Shirley Ann Templo	Dem	Honolulu	Kalihi, Kalihi Kai, Ke‘ehi Lagoon, Hickam Village	2024
31	Linda Ichiyama	Dem	Honolulu	Fort Shafter Flats, Salt Lake, Pearl Harbor	2010
32	Garner Shimizu	Rep	Honolulu	Fort Shafter, Moanalua, Āliamanu, Foster Village, portions of ʻAiea and Hālawa	2024
33	Sam Satoru Kong	Dem	Honolulu	Portion of Hālawa, ʻAiea, Waimalu	2014
34	Gregg Takayama	Dem	Honolulu	Pearl City, Waiau, Pacific Palisades	2012
35	Cory Chun	Dem	Honolulu	Portions of Pearl City and Waipahū, Crestview	2022
36	Rachele Lamosao	Dem	Honolulu	Waipahū	2022
37	Trish La Chica (Note: Appointed to seat on February 15, 2023 by Governor Josh Green after Ryan Yamane was appointed to join the governor's cabinet.)	Dem	Honolulu	Portions of Mililani Town, Mililani Mauka, Koa Ridge, and Waipiʻo Gentry	2023
38	Lauren Matsumoto	Rep	Honolulu	Portions of Mililani and Waipio Acres, Mililani Mauka	2012
39	Elijah Pierick	Rep	Honolulu	Royal Kunia, Village Park, Honoʻuliʻuli, Hoʻopili, portion of Waipahū	2022
40	Julie Reyes Oda	Rep	Honolulu	Portions of Lower Village and ʻEwa Beach, Iroquois Point	2024
41	David Alcos	Rep	Honolulu	Portion of ʻEwa Beach, Ocean Pointe, Barbers Point	2022
42	Diamond Garcia	Rep	Honolulu	Portions of Varona Village, Ewa, Kapolei, Fernandez Village	2022
43	Kanani Souza	Rep	Honolulu	Kapolei, Makakilo	2022
44	Darius Kila	Dem	Honolulu	Honokai Hale, Nānākuli, Māʻili	2024
45	Chris Muraoka	Rep	Honolulu	Waiʻanae, Mākaha	2016
46	Amy Perruso	Dem	Honolulu	Portion of Waipio Acres, Launani Valley, Wahiawā, Whitmore Village, Waialua, Mokulēʻia	2018
47	Sean Quinlan	Dem	Honolulu	Waialua, Hale‘iwa, Waialua, Hale‘iwa, Kawailoa Beach, Waimea, Sunset Beach, Waiale‘e, Kawela Bay, Kahuku, Lā‘ie, Hauʻula, Punaluʻu, Kahana	2016
48	Lisa Kitagawa	Dem	Honolulu	Kaʻaʻawa, Kahalu‘u, ‘Āhuimanu, Heʻeia, Kāneʻohe	2018
49	Scot Matayoshi	Dem	Honolulu	Kāneʻohe, Maunawili	2018
50	Mike Lee	Dem	Honolulu	Kailua, portion of Kāneʻohe Bay	2024
51	Lisa Marten	Dem	Honolulu	Waimānalo, Keolu Hills, Lanikai, portion of Kailua	2020

== See also ==
- List of Hawaii state legislatures
