= Neighborhood Boards of Honolulu =

Neighborhood Board System of the City and County of Honolulu
- Seal of the City and County of Honolulu
- Formation: 1973
- Website: Neighborhood Commission Office, City and County of Honolulu

== Neighborhood Boards ==
Mission
The only government-supported civic engagement system in Hawaii, Oahu’s Neighborhood Board System was created in 1973 to assure and increase community participation in the decision-making process of government. The system applies the concept of participatory democracy, involving communities in the decisions that affect them. It establishes an island-wide network of elected neighborhood boards as communication channels, expanding and facilitating opportunities for community and government interaction.

What is a Neighborhood Board?
The process for development of the Neighborhood Board System began when the Revised City Charter of Honolulu (1973) called for the establishment of a nine-member Neighborhood Commission. The Commission was responsible for developing a Neighborhood Plan outlining a uniform system of neighborhood boards on Oahu. Neighborhood boards were then formed in accordance with the plan.

The 33 neighborhood boards, with their 437 volunteer board members, serve as advisory groups to the Honolulu City Council, the City administration, departments, agencies, and other public officials of the state and federal governments. Oahu’s neighborhood boards meet monthly, and function as an island-wide communication conduit, expanding and facilitating opportunities for community and government interaction.

The Neighborhood Plan designates neighborhood boundaries throughout Oahu and provides procedures for forming neighborhood areas and neighborhood boards. Some of the Plan’s major points are:

- 35 neighborhood areas (boundaries).
- Initiative petition of 100 registered voters or five percent of voters within the area (whichever is less) for the formation of a neighborhood.
- Election of board members by residents 18 years and older.
- Two-year terms for board members.
- Advisory role for all neighborhood boards.

Who can serve on a Neighborhood Board?
All residents of Oahu, including military personnel and legal resident aliens, who reside in the neighborhood board area and subdistrict and who are at least eighteen (18) years of age are eligible to serve on the neighborhood board. Neighborhood board elections are conducted biennially.

How can a citizen participate in the system?
Community participation is encouraged and welcomed by the boards. There are many ways in which the community can participate, some of which are:

- Voicing your concerns to your board representatives though personal contact or letters.
- Attending the regular monthly meetings, public forums and other community events sponsored by your board.
- Volunteering to participate on a board committee. You can help resolve community problems or work on a community project.
- Responding to surveys conducted by the board.
- Be a candidate and/or vote in your board’s election.

The following Honolulu Neighborhood Boards are current as of July 2026:

1. Hawaii Kai
2. Kuliouou-Kalani Iki
3. Waialae-Kahala
4. Kaimukī
5. Diamond Head-Kapahulu-St. Louis
6. Pālolo
7. Mānoa
8. McCully-Mōʻiliʻili
9. Waikīkī
10. Makiki-Tantalus
11. Ala Moana-Kakaʻako
12. Nuuanu-Punchbowl
13. Downtown
14. Liliha-'Ālewa
15. Kalihi-Palama
16. Kalihi Valley
17. Moanalua
18. Aliamanu-Salt Lake
19. Airport [abolished]
20. ʻAiea
21. Pearl City
22. Waipahu
23. ʻEwa
24. Waianae Coast
25. Mililani-Waipiʻo
26. Wahiawā-Whitmore Village
27. North Shore
28. Koolauloa
29. Kahaluʻu
30. Kaneohe
31. Kailua
32. Waimānalo
33. Mōkapu [abolished]
34. Makakilo-Kapolei-Honokai Hale
35. Mililani Mauka/Launani Valley
36. Nānākuli-Māʻili

== Neighborhood Board Elections ==
In accordance with the Neighborhood Plan, board member terms last for a period of two years, from July 1 of an odd numbered year to June 30 of the next successive odd numbered year. All board seats are up for election at the end of the term. The one individual, one vote principle applies in all board elections. Any individual, including military personnel, military family members, and legal resident aliens, who is at least 18 years of age by the third Friday in February of the election year may register as a candidate, as well as register as a voter.

Nation's first all-digital election
In 2009, the Neighborhood Board Elections became the first all-digital election in the nation, which has historically paper- and postal- based election. The cost of conducting the election has decreased significantly because of the initiative.

Harvard Kennedy School's Ash Center for Democratic Governance and Innovation named the Election a "Bright Idea" in its 2015 awards cycle.

Election of Officers
Per the Neighborhood Plan of 2008, the boards elect officers not limited to a Chairperson, Vice Chairperson, Secretary and Treasurer every year, for a one-year term to begin at the meeting on or after July 1 of each year. These elections are open solely to current board members, as the first item of business on the agenda of the first meeting for the new officers' terms.

== Neighborhood Commission ==
The Neighborhood Commission consists of nine members. Four are appointed by the Mayor, four by the City Council, and the ninth member is appointed by the Mayor and confirmed by the City Council. A total of five members must have prior board experience. Each member serves a five-year term. The Commission is responsible for the periodic review and evaluation of the Plan and the neighborhood boards, and assists in the formation of neighborhood boards upon request.

== Neighborhood Commission Office ==
The Neighborhood Commission Office provides administrative and technical support services to the Neighborhood Commission, the 33 neighborhood boards of the City and County of Honolulu, and the City administration.

== Neighborhood Commission Office Re-brand and Launch of Social Media ==
With only 18% of board members being 18 years old to 45 years old, and 38% of members serving 10 or more years (Neighborhood Commission Survey, 2014), in 2013 the NCO identified a need to increase citizen engagement to reflect the true demographic make-up of the island and to bring more people into the system. Additionally, through outreach done at community events, we found that 35% of people we spoke to had never heard about the system at all, with 44% being only vaguely familiar. This signaled to the NCO that building general awareness of the system was paramount, and that all means to do this must be employed.

In May 2013, the NCO recognized that social media provides new ways for constituents, organizations, and government to communicate with each other. To increase both general awareness and outreach to communities across the island, the NCO has built out its social media suite.
