= List of Hawaii state legislatures =

The legislature of the U.S. state of Hawaii has convened many times since statehood became effective on August 21, 1959. It continues to operate under the amended 1950 Constitution of Hawaii.

== Legislatures ==
Name	Start date	End date	Last election
1st Hawaii state legislature	1959	1962	July 1959: Senate
2nd Hawaii state legislature	1963		
3rd Hawaii state legislature	1965		
4th Hawaii state legislature	1967		
5th Hawaii state legislature	1969		
6th Hawaii state legislature	1971		
7th Hawaii state legislature	1973		
8th Hawaii state legislature	1975		
9th Hawaii state legislature	1977		
10th Hawaii state legislature	1979		
11th Hawaii state legislature	1981		
12th Hawaii state legislature	1983		
13th Hawaii state legislature	1985		
14th Hawaii state legislature	1987		
15th Hawaii state legislature	1989		
16th Hawaii state legislature	1991		
17th Hawaii state legislature	1993		
18th Hawaii state legislature	1995		
19th Hawaii state legislature	1997		
20th Hawaii state legislature	1999		
21st Hawaii state legislature	2001		
22nd Hawaii state legislature	2003		
23rd Hawaii state legislature	2005		
24th Hawaii state legislature	2007		
25th Hawaii state legislature	2009		
26th Hawaii state legislature	2011		
27th Hawaii state legislature	2013		November 2012: House, Senate
28th Hawaii state legislature	2015		November 2014: Senate
29th Hawaii State Legislature	2017		November 2016: Senate
30th Hawaii state legislature	2019		November 2018: House, Senate
31st Hawaii state legislature	2021		November 2020: House, Senate
32nd Hawaii State Legislature	2023		November 2022: House, Senate
33rd Hawaii State Legislature	2025		November 5, 2024: House, Senate
34th Hawaii State Legislature	2027		November 3, 2026: House, Senate

== See also ==
- List of speakers of the Hawaii House of Representatives
- List of presidents of the Hawaii Senate
- List of governors of Hawaii
- List of lieutenant governors of Hawaii
- Politics of Hawaii
- Elections in Hawaii
- Hawaii State Capitol
- Historical outline of Hawaii
- Lists of United States state legislative sessions
