= Kirstin Kahaloa =

American politician

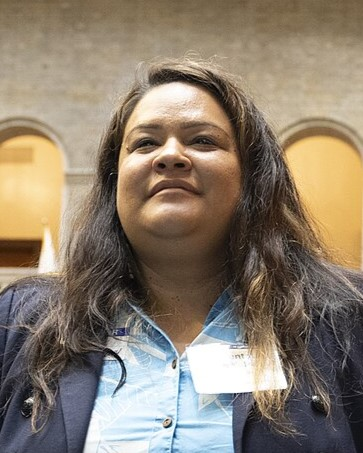
- Kahaloa in 2024

Member of the Hawaii House of Representatives from the 6th district
- Incumbent
- Assumed office November 8, 2022
- Preceded by: Constituency established

Personal details
- Born: 1982 or 1983 (age 43–44) Honolulu, Hawaiʻi
- Party: Democratic
- Children: 1
- Education: University of Evansville; Webster University
- Website: capitol.hawaii.gov/house/kahaloa

Kirstin A. K. Kahaloa is an American politician serving in the Hawaii House of Representatives for the 6th district (Honaunau, Captain Cook, Kealakekua, Keauhou, Holualoa, Kailua-Kona). She won the seat in the 2022 election against Republican opponent Jonathan Kennealy, as part of the largest freshman class in the House in decades.

== Early life and education ==
Kahaloa was born and raised on Hawaii Island and graduated from Kamehameha Schools in 2001.

She holds a Bachelor’s in international studies and political science from the University of Evansville, a Master’s in public service administration from the same university, and a Master’s in management and leadership from Webster University.

== Career ==
Kahaloa worked as executive director of the Kona-Kohala Chamber of Commerce, legislative aide to Senator Dru Kanuha, community engagement lead for the Blue Zones Project, portfolio manager - sustainable industry development for Kamehameha Schools, and most recently as director of programs and partnerships for the 'Iole Global Resiliency Hub.

=== Hawaii House of Representatives ===
Kahaloa's priorities including improving access to health care and advocating for agricultural needs.

During the 32nd Hawaii State Legislature, she worked with Senator Dru Kanuha and Representative Nicole Lowen to prioritize over $18 million in funding for upgrades to the Kona Community Hospital. Kahaloa also introduced an agricultural labeling bill to protect macadamia nut farmers; the bill was approved by the legislature.
