= Lawrence McCully =

American judge

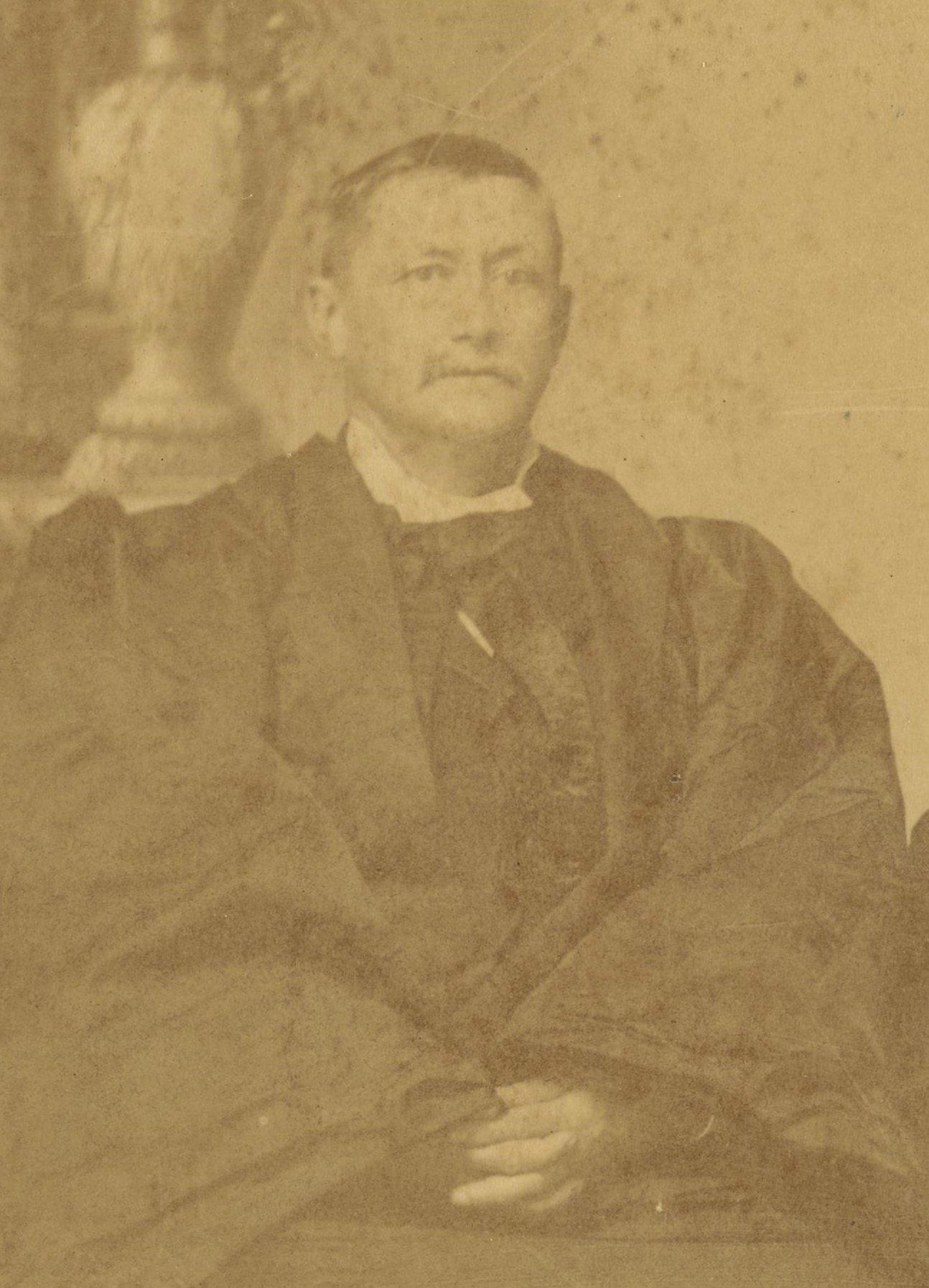
Lawrence McCully in 1885

Lawrence McCully (May 28, 1831 – April 10, 1892) was an American lawyer, businessman, politician, and judge, who served as a justice of the Hawaii Supreme Court and Speaker of the Hawaii House of Representatives.

== Early life, education, and career ==
McCully, son of Charles McCully, was born in New York City on May 28, 1831. About two years later his father moved to Oswego, New York, and he was educated at Courtlandt Academy in Homer, New York. He entered Yale College at the beginning of his sophomore year, and graduated Yale in 1852. Having taught for several months for a family in New Orleans, and for a year in Kentucky, he then formed a plan of settling in the Hawaiian Islands, where he arrived in December, 1854. The introductions which he brought secured him an appointment as Police Justice of the Hilo district, which he held from Sept. 1, 1855, until his resignation on April 1, 1857. He then bought land and set out an orange orchard at Kona, Hawaii, but in 1858 moved to Honolulu, where he began the study of law in the office of Chief Justice Charles Coffin Harris. He gained admission to the bar in March, 1859.

== Legal, political, and judicial career ==
In 1860 he was elected to the Hawaii House of Representatives, of which he was chosen Speaker, under the Constitution of 1852. From April, 1862, he served as Interpreter to the Supreme Court, resigning his office in January, 1865, to become the clerk of the same Court, including a period as Deputy Clerk in 1864. Six years later, in 1871, he resigned this office also, in order to accept the position of Deputy Attorney-General. On February 1, 1877, he was commissioned as Second Associate Justice of the Supreme Court of the Kingdom of Hawaii by King Kalākaua, and remained on the court for fifteen years, until his death. On November 5, 1881, he was promoted to First Associate Justice, which role also included duties as Vice Chancellor.

McCully contributed to several volumes of the Hawaiian Reports, served as a Commissioner of Boundaries, and participated in a compilation of statutes completed in 1889.

== Personal life and death ==
On May 26, 1866, McCully married Ellen Harvey, of Kenduskeag, Maine. They married at the residence of Chief Justice Elisha H. Allen. Ellen survived McCully, with an adopted child.

McCully traveled to Europe in 1883 and 1891, but following his 1891 visit, he was prostrated by an attack of the grip in California on his return. His health, which had previously been somewhat delicate, was thus undermined, and he failed gradually. McCully died at his residence in Honolulu, after a prolonged illness, at age 60.

The Honolulu suburb of McCully is named in his honour.

== Attribution ==
This article incorporates public domain material from the 1892 Yale Obituary Record.
