= 34th Hawaii State Legislature =

American legislative session

←	33rd	35th	→
- The Great Seal of the State of Hawaii

Overview
- Legislative body: Hawaii State Legislature
- Meeting place: Hawaii State Capitol
- Election: November 3, 2026

Senate
- Members: 25 senators
- Party control: Democratic

House of Representatives
- Members: 51 representatives
- Party control: Democratic

Sessions
- 2027: January 20, 2027 – TBD
- 2028: TBD – TBD

The Thirty-Fourth Hawaii State Legislature is the upcoming meeting of the legislative branch of the state of Hawaii, composed of the Hawaii House of Representatives and the Hawaii Senate. It is scheduled to convene on January 20, 2027, following the November 2026 elections for the House and Senate.

== Political composition ==
=== Senate ===
Affiliation	Party (Shading indicates majority caucus)			Total	Vacant
Affiliation	Democratic	Republican	Independent	Total	Vacant
End of previous legislature (2026)	22	3	0	25	0
Begin (2027)	22	2	1	25	0
Latest voting share	88%	8%	4%		

=== House of Representatives ===
Affiliation	Party (Shading indicates majority caucus)			Total	
Affiliation	Democratic	Republican	Green	Total	Vacant
End of previous legislature (2026)	41	10	0	51	0
Begin (2027)	44	6	1	51	0
Latest voting share	86.3%	11.8%	2%		

== See also ==
- List of Hawaii state legislatures
