= McCully, Hawaii =

Neighborhood of Honolulu, Hawaii, United States

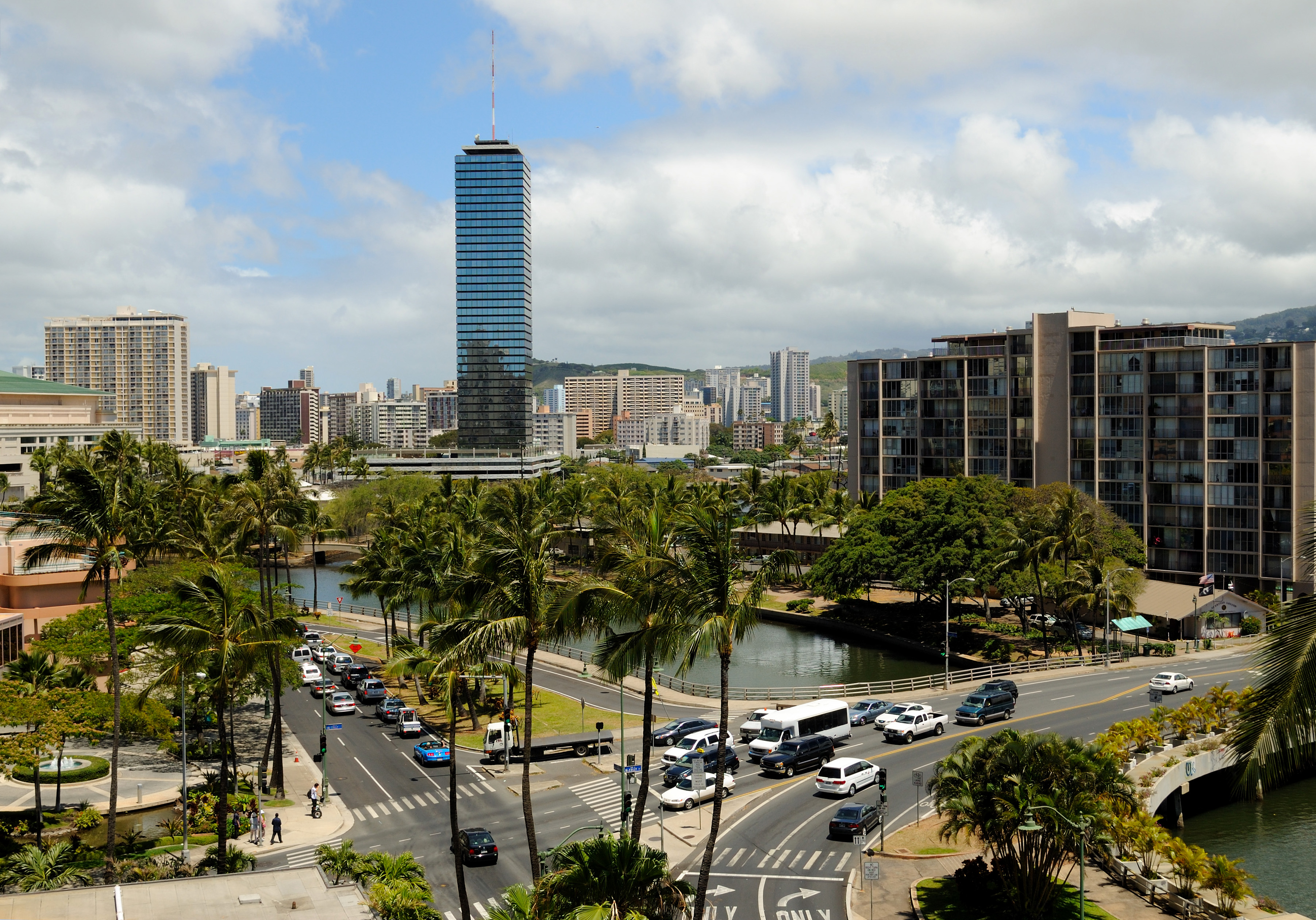
McCully Street in Honolulu, Hawaii.

McCully is a neighborhood of Honolulu, Hawaii, on the island of Oahu.

== History ==
McCully is named after Lawrence McCully (1831–1892) who was a justice of the Hawaii Supreme Court and Speaker of the Hawaii House of Representatives.

On January 6, 2025, a structure fire in McCully killed a responding firefighter from the Honolulu Fire Department. The ATF opened an investigation into the fire.

== Places of interest ==
- McCully Shopping Center

== Politics ==
McCully is part of Hawaii's 1st congressional district and District 23 in the Hawaii House of Representatives.

== See also ==
- Mōʻiliʻili, Hawaii
