= Justin Woodson =

American politician (born 1976/77)

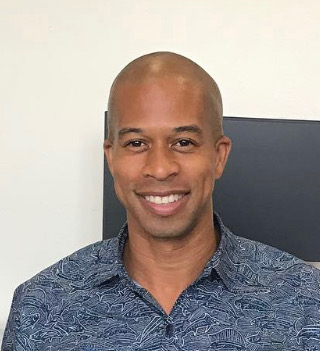

Member of the Hawaii House of Representatives from the 9th district
- Incumbent
- Assumed office January 15, 2013
- Appointed by: Neil Abercrombie
- Preceded by: Gilbert Keith-Agaran

Personal details
- Born: 1976 or 1977 (age 49–50) Kansas
- Party: Democratic
- Spouse: Stacy Suyat Woodson
- Children: 4
- Education: California State University Fullerton
- Profession: Small Business Owner

Justin Howard Woodson is an American politician and a Democratic member of the Hawaii House of Representatives since January 15, 2013 representing District 9, which includes Kahului, Puʻunene, Old Sand Hills, and Maui Lani. Woodson currently serves as chairperson on the Committee of Higher and Lower Education, a member of the Housing and Transportation Committee, and serves as the Majority Whip for the House. Woodson previously served as a member on the Intrastate, Tourism, Veterans, Military, International Affairs, Culture and Arts Committees.

Woodson helped initiate the Hawaiʻi Promise Program, Hawaiʻi's version of free college within the community college system for in-state students that demonstrate financial need. Woodson has publicly expressed his interest in expanding the Hawaiʻi Promise Program to all University of Hawaiʻi schools and is a strong advocate for world class K-12 public education in the state of Hawaiʻi and across the United States. He is also a proponent of early education and has worked to help build out a high quality public pre-kindergarten system in Hawaiʻi.

== Personal life ==
Woodson and his wife, Stacy Suyat Woodson, have four children.

== Education ==
Woodson earned his BA in political science from California State University Fullerton.

== Elections ==
- Woodson was appointed by Hawaii Governor Neil Abercrombie to fill the vacancy left by current Hawaii State Senator Gilbert Keith-Agaran
- In 2014, Woodson defeated James "Kimo" Apana to the Hawaii House of Representative.
- In 2016, Woodson won re-election to the Hawaii House of Representatives.
- In 2018, Woodson defeated Kauanoe Batangan in the Democratic primary for the Hawaii House of Representatives District 9 on August 11, 2018.
