= Hāʻena, Kauaʻi County, Hawaii =

Unincorporated community in Hawaii, United States

Hāʻena, Hawaii
- Census-designated place
- Location within Hawaii
- Coordinates: 22°13′17″N 159°33′41″W
- Country: United States
- State: Hawaii
- County: Kauaʻi

Area
  - Total: 1.453 sq mi (3.76 km^{2})
  - Land: 1.453 sq mi (3.76 km^{2})
  - Water: 0 sq mi (0 km^{2})
- Elevation: 23 ft (7.0 m)

Population (2020)
  - Total: 550
  - Density: 380/sq mi (150/km^{2})
- Time zone: UTC-10 (Hawaii-Aleutian)
- Area code: 808
- GNIS feature ID: 365072

Hāʻena is an unincorporated community and census-designated place on the island of Kauaʻi in Kauaʻi County, Hawaii, United States. Its population was 550 as of the 2020 census. Hāʻena is on the island's north side, along Hawaii Route 560.

== Geography ==
Hāʻena is located at 22.2213479°N 159.5612936°W. According to the U.S. Census Bureau, it has an area of 1.453 square miles (3.76 km^{2}), all land.
