= Waiheʻe-Waiehu, Hawaii =

Waiheʻe-Waiehu
- Census-designated place
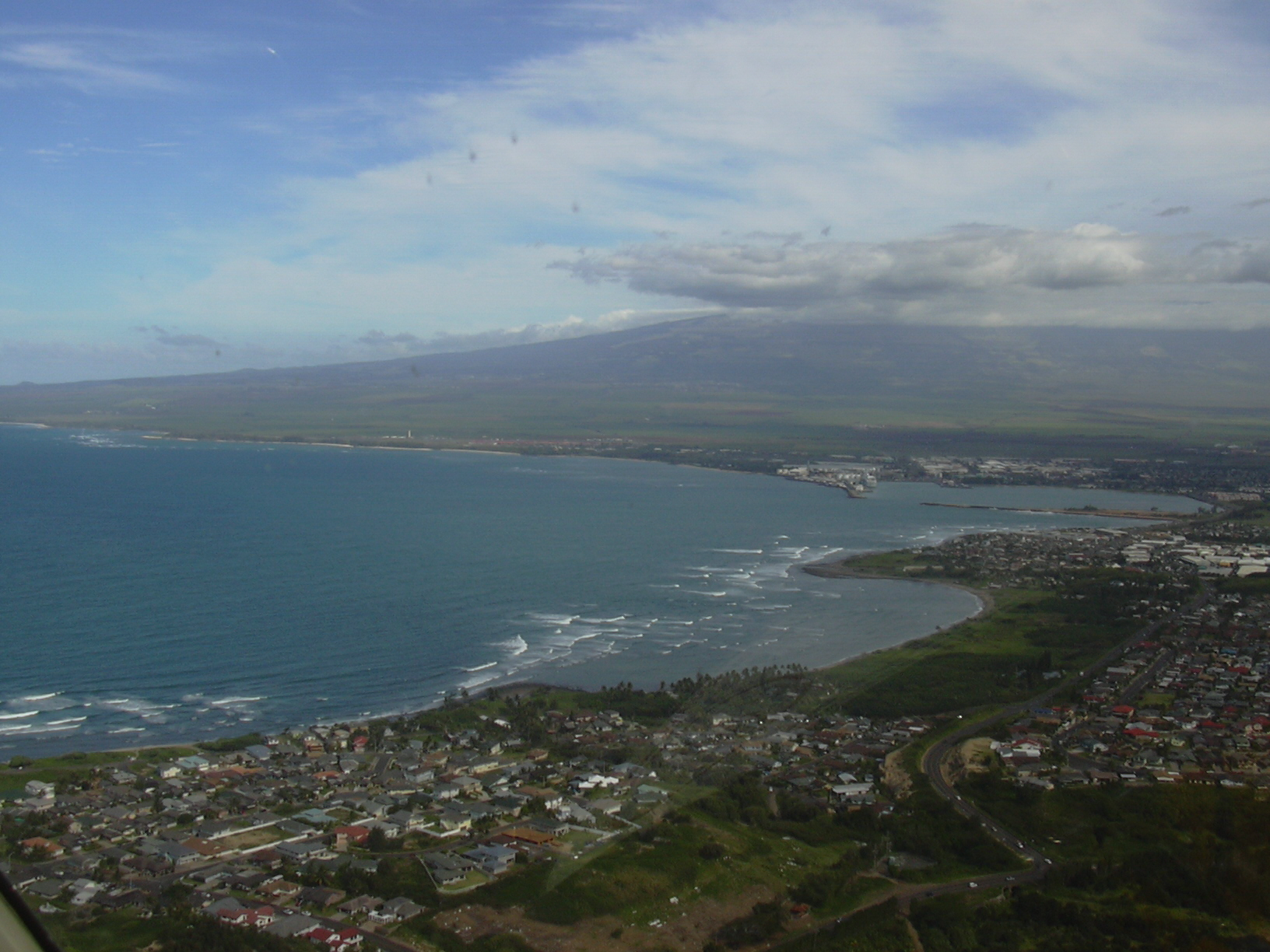
- Aerial view, with Kahului Harbor in background

- Location in Maui County and the state of Hawaii
- Coordinates: 20°55′11″N 156°30′16″W
- Country: United States
- State: Hawaii
- County: Maui

Area
  - Total: 5.12 sq mi (13.27 km^{2})
  - Land: 4.26 sq mi (11.04 km^{2})
  - Water: 0.86 sq mi (2.22 km^{2})

Population (2020)
  - Total: 9,234
  - Density: 2,165.6/sq mi (836.13/km^{2})
- Time zone: UTC-10 (Hawaii-Aleutian)
- ZIP code: 96793
- Area code: 808
- FIPS code: 15-75510

Waiheʻe-Waiehu is a census-designated place (CDP) in Maui County, Hawaii, United States. The population was 9,234 at the 2020 census.

== Geography ==
Waiheʻe-Waiehu is located at 20°55′11″N 156°30′16″W (20.919590, -156.504522), on the east coast of the western half of Maui. The West Maui Mountains lie to the west, and Wailuku borders it on the southeast.

According to the United States Census Bureau, the CDP has a total area of 5.0 square miles (12.9 km^{2}), of which 4.1 square miles (10.7 km^{2}) is land and 0.85 square miles (2.2 km^{2}), or 17.32%, is water.

== Demographics ==
Historical population
Census	Pop.	Note	%±
2020	9,234		—
U.S. Decennial Census

At the 2000 census there were 7,310 people, 1,864 households, and 1,597 families in the CDP. The population density was 1,718.5 inhabitants per square mile (663.5/km^{2}). There were 1,909 housing units at an average density of 448.8 per square mile (173.3/km^{2}). The racial makeup of the CDP was 13.42% White, 0.29% African American, 0.14% Native American, 45.54% Asian, 14.62% Pacific Islander, 1.01% from other races, and 24.98% from two or more races. Hispanic or Latino of any race were 7.80%.

Of the 1,864 households 51.5% had children under the age of 18 living with them, 67.3% were married couples living together, 12.8% had a female householder with no husband present, and 14.3% were non-families. 9.9% of households were one person and 3.6% were one person aged 65 or older. The average household size was 3.92 and the average family size was 4.14.

The age distribution was 32.6% under the age of 18, 8.7% from 18 to 24, 29.8% from 25 to 44, 20.9% from 45 to 64, and 8.0% 65 or older. The median age was 33 years. For every 100 females, there were 100.5 males. For every 100 females age 18 and over, there were 97.4 males.

The median household income was $63,236 and the median family income was $64,195. Males had a median income of $34,742 versus $27,015 for females. The per capita income for the CDP was $18,008. About 5.2% of families and 6.8% of the population were below the poverty line, including 5.6% of those under age 18 and 2.0% of those age 65 or over.
