= Hawaiian Ocean View, Hawaii =

Census-designated place in Hawaii, United States

- Census-designated place
- Location in Hawaii County and the state of Hawaii
- Coordinates: 19°6′28″N 155°46′2″W
- Country: United States
- State: Hawaii
- County: Hawaii

Area
  - Total: 36.30 sq mi (94.02 km^{2})
  - Land: 36.30 sq mi (94.02 km^{2})
  - Water: 0 sq mi (0.00 km^{2})
- Elevation: 1,570 ft (480 m)

Population (2020)
  - Total: 4,864
  - Density: 134.0/sq mi (51.73/km^{2})
- Time zone: UTC-10 (Hawaii-Aleutian)
- Area code: 808
- FIPS code: 15-12530
- GNIS feature ID: 1867253

Hawaiian Ocean View (usually referred to as "Ocean View") is a census-designated place (CDP) in Hawaiʻi County, Hawaiʻi, United States located in the District of Kaʻū. It includes the subdivisions of Hawaiian Ocean View Estates (HOVE), Hawaiian Ocean View Ranchos, Kahuku Country Gardens, Kula Kai View Estates, Kona Gardens, Keone's Ranchos, and Kona View Estates. As of the 2020 census, Hawaiian Ocean View had a population of 4,864.

== History ==
The HOVE development consisted of 10,697 1-acre (4,000 m^{2}) lots north of the Hawaii Belt Road in the western part of the District of Kaʻū. The terrain varies from rugged lava fields to ohiʻa trees and other vegetation. Elevation ranges from about 1,500 ft (460 m) up to the 5,000-foot (1,500 m) level. Initial sales began in the late 1950s. The original developer of HOVE was the Crawford Oil Company. Later, other subdivisions were put in place downslope of HOVE and the Hawaii Belt Road. In the early 1980s a service station and a hardware store were built.

In 1989 the Ocean View Town Center was developed, and the Ocean View Road Maintenance Corporation began an extensive rebuilding program of the roads. Shortly thereafter the Ocean View Development Corporation started a new market which included a laundromat and restaurant. Ocean View now has two shopping centers.

In January 2004, Hawaii Volcanoes National Park purchased the nearby property previously known as Kahuku Ranch.

Ocean View has a post office with the ZIP code of 96737. The USPS does not provide street delivery of mail except on Mamalahoa Highway. It is, therefore, difficult to get confirmation of a Street address for mail order companies to send purchases.

== Geography ==
Ocean View is located at the southern end of the island of Hawaii at 19°6′28″N 155°46′2″W (19.107649, -155.767186), on the southwest rift zone of the shield volcano Mauna Loa. Its elevation ranges from 600 feet (180 m) above sea level along the southern edge of the CDP, to 4,900 feet (1,500 m) along the northern edge.

Hawaii Route 11 passes through the community, leading northeast 76 miles (122 km) to Hilo and northwest 46 miles (74 km) to Kailua-Kona.

According to the United States Census Bureau, the CDP has a total area of 36.8 square miles (95.3 km^{2}), all of it land.

The area is prone to earthquakes.

=== Climate ===
The Hawaiian Ocean View climate borders between a Tropical Savanna Climate (Köppen As) and a Hot Semi-arid Climate (Köppen BSh). The average temperature in January is almost cool enough to qualify this climate as a warm-winter form of a Mediterranean climate (Köppen climate classification Csb) or a uniform rainfall Subtropical highland climate (Köppen climate classification Cfb).

Climate data for Hawaiian Ocean View, Hawaii, 1991–2020 normals, extremes 1989–2012
| Month | Jan | Feb | Mar | Apr | May | Jun | Jul | Aug | Sep | Oct | Nov | Dec | Year |
|---|---|---|---|---|---|---|---|---|---|---|---|---|---|
| Record high °F (°C) | 85 (29) | 87 (31) | 84 (29) | 85 (29) | 91 (33) | 87 (31) | 90 (32) | 89 (32) | 89 (32) | 91 (33) | 87 (31) | 85 (29) | 91 (33) |
| Mean maximum °F (°C) | 80.7 (27.1) | 80.7 (27.1) | 81.1 (27.3) | 81.7 (27.6) | 82.6 (28.1) | 82.9 (28.3) | 84.6 (29.2) | 85.7 (29.8) | 84.5 (29.2) | 85.3 (29.6) | 83.1 (28.4) | 81.4 (27.4) | 87.2 (30.7) |
| Mean daily maximum °F (°C) | 75.0 (23.9) | 74.7 (23.7) | 75.2 (24.0) | 75.9 (24.4) | 76.3 (24.6) | 77.2 (25.1) | 78.1 (25.6) | 79.1 (26.2) | 78.5 (25.8) | 78.9 (26.1) | 78.1 (25.6) | 76.7 (24.8) | 77.0 (25.0) |
| Daily mean °F (°C) | 64.6 (18.1) | 64.5 (18.1) | 65.1 (18.4) | 66.1 (18.9) | 66.9 (19.4) | 67.8 (19.9) | 68.8 (20.4) | 69.6 (20.9) | 69.2 (20.7) | 69.1 (20.6) | 68.1 (20.1) | 66.2 (19.0) | 67.2 (19.6) |
| Mean daily minimum °F (°C) | 54.2 (12.3) | 54.4 (12.4) | 55.0 (12.8) | 56.3 (13.5) | 57.5 (14.2) | 58.5 (14.7) | 59.6 (15.3) | 60.0 (15.6) | 59.8 (15.4) | 59.4 (15.2) | 58.1 (14.5) | 55.8 (13.2) | 57.4 (14.1) |
| Mean minimum °F (°C) | 49.9 (9.9) | 50.0 (10.0) | 51.0 (10.6) | 52.5 (11.4) | 54.4 (12.4) | 55.4 (13.0) | 56.5 (13.6) | 56.6 (13.7) | 56.6 (13.7) | 56.0 (13.3) | 54.3 (12.4) | 51.0 (10.6) | 48.5 (9.2) |
| Record low °F (°C) | 47 (8) | 47 (8) | 47 (8) | 50 (10) | 51 (11) | 50 (10) | 54 (12) | 54 (12) | 53 (12) | 52 (11) | 48 (9) | 47 (8) | 47 (8) |
| Average precipitation inches (mm) | 2.69 (68) | 1.82 (46) | 2.45 (62) | 1.30 (33) | 1.43 (36) | 0.89 (23) | 1.32 (34) | 1.61 (41) | 2.20 (56) | 1.87 (47) | 1.64 (42) | 2.11 (54) | 21.33 (542) |
| Average precipitation days (≥ 0.01 in) | 7.3 | 7.8 | 9.9 | 8.8 | 10.9 | 10.3 | 10.6 | 9.3 | 13.0 | 10.1 | 7.6 | 7.4 | 113.0 |
Source: NOAA

== Demographics ==
Historical population
| Census | Pop. | Note | %± |
|---|---|---|---|
| 2020 | 4,864 | | — |
U.S. Decennial Census

=== 2020 census ===
As of the 2020 census, Hawaiian Ocean View had a population of 4,864. The median age was 49.6 years. 20.3% of residents were under the age of 18 and 25.5% of residents were 65 years of age or older. For every 100 females there were 108.9 males, and for every 100 females age 18 and over there were 110.1 males age 18 and over.

0.0% of residents lived in urban areas, while 100.0% lived in rural areas.

There were 2,075 households in Hawaiian Ocean View, of which 22.3% had children under the age of 18 living in them. Of all households, 37.0% were married-couple households, 30.2% were households with a male householder and no spouse or partner present, and 23.1% were households with a female householder and no spouse or partner present. About 35.2% of all households were made up of individuals and 19.0% had someone living alone who was 65 years of age or older.

There were 2,648 housing units, of which 21.6% were vacant. The homeowner vacancy rate was 2.0% and the rental vacancy rate was 3.9%.

Racial composition as of the 2020 census
| Race | Number | Percent |
|---|---|---|
| White | 2,508 | 51.6% |
| Black or African American | 47 | 1.0% |
| American Indian and Alaska Native | 55 | 1.1% |
| Asian | 288 | 5.9% |
| Native Hawaiian and Other Pacific Islander | 987 | 20.3% |
| Some other race | 161 | 3.3% |
| Two or more races | 818 | 16.8% |
| Hispanic or Latino (of any race) | 464 | 9.5% |

=== 2000 census ===
As of the census of 2000, there were 2,178 people, 941 households, and 541 families residing in the CDP. The population density was 21.4 people per square mile (8.3 people/km^{2}). There were 1,382 housing units at an average density of 13.5 per square mile (5.2/km^{2}). The racial makeup of the CDP was 56.75% White, 1.01% African American, 1.10% Native American, 6.34% Asian, 11.02% Pacific Islander, 1.97% from other races, and 21.81% from two or more races. Hispanic or Latino of any race were 8.40% of the population.

There were 941 households, out of which 25.0% had children under the age of 18 living with them, 42.1% were married couples living together, 9.6% had a female householder with no husband present, and 42.5% were non-families. 33.7% of all households were made up of individuals, and 7.3% had someone living alone who was 65 years of age or older. The average household size was 2.31 and the average family size was 2.97.

In the CDP the population age distribution was 24.6% under the age of 18, 4.3% from 18 to 24, 25.4% from 25 to 44, 33.0% from 45 to 64, and 12.8% who were 65 years of age or older. The median age was 43 years. For every 100 females, there were 113.5 males. For every 100 females age 18 and over, there were 117.6 males.

The median income for a household in the CDP was $26,125, and the median income for a family was $34,234. Males had a median income of $28,523 versus $20,938 for females. The per capita income for the CDP was $15,218. About 13.0% of families and 25.2% of the population were below the poverty line, including 32.3% of those under age 18 and 16.5% of those age 65 or over.
