= Waiʻalae, Hawaii =

Coordinates: 21°16′30″N 157°47′24″W

Waiʻalae (Hawaiian pronunciation: [wɐjʔəˈlɐe]) is a neighborhood of Honolulu on the island of Oʻahu in Hawaiʻi, United States. The Waiʻalae means "mudhen water". The Waiʻalae Country Club is here and Waiʻalae Iki and Waiʻalae Nui, which are above Waiʻalae along the ridge, are located here, also. It is also home to Chaminade University of Honolulu. Val Ossipoff designed many organic homes and buildings in Waiʻalae Nui.
