= Hickam Housing, Hawaii =

Census-designated place in Hawaii, United States

Hickam Housing
- Census-designated place
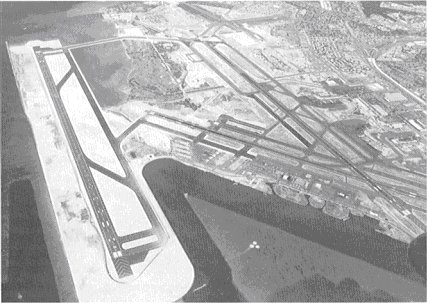
- Hickam Air Force Base, Oʻahu, Hawaii

- Location within Hawaii
- Coordinates: 21°19′49″N 157°57′14″W
- Country: United States
- State: Hawaii

Area
  - Total: 4.90 sq mi (12.70 km^{2})
  - Land: 4.61 sq mi (11.94 km^{2})
  - Water: 0.30 sq mi (0.77 km^{2})
- Elevation: 6 ft (1.8 m)

Population (2020)
  - Total: 7,581
  - Density: 1,645.0/sq mi (635.13/km^{2})
- Time zone: UTC-10 (Hawaii-Aleutian)
- Area code: 808
- FIPS code: 15-14200

Hickam Housing is a census-designated place comprising part of Joint Base Pearl Harbor–Hickam in the City & County of Honolulu, Hawaii, United States. The population was 7,581 at the 2020 census. The CDP occupies the area is also referred to as Hickam Air Force Base.

A portion of Daniel K. Inouye International Airport is in the CDP.

== Geography ==
The Hickam Housing CDP is centered on 21°19′49″N 157°57′14″W (21.3306, -157.9541). According to the United States Census Bureau, the CDP has a total area of 4.9 square miles (12.6 km^{2}), of which 4.6 square miles (11.9 km^{2}) is land and 0.31 square miles (0.8 km^{2}), or 6.08%, is water. The community is located on Joint Base Pearl Harbor–Hickam, primarily occupying the land that was formerly part of Hickam Air Force Base, but also occupying a small portion of land that was formerly part of Naval Station Pearl Harbor. The CDP is bordered to the east by Honolulu International Airport, to the south by Mamala Bay, to the west by the entrance to Pearl Harbor, and to the north by additional land within Joint Base Pearl Harbor-Hickam.

== Demographics ==
Historical population
Census	Pop.	Note	%±
2020	7,581		—
U.S. Decennial Census

=== 2020 census ===
As of the 2020 census, Hickam Housing had a population of 7,581. The median age was 26.8 years. 36.0% of residents were under the age of 18 and 1.3% of residents were 65 years of age or older. For every 100 females there were 105.8 males, and for every 100 females age 18 and over there were 107.7 males age 18 and over.

100.0% of residents lived in urban areas, while 0.0% lived in rural areas.

There were 2,229 households in Hickam Housing, of which 62.2% had children under the age of 18 living in them. Of all households, 79.5% were married-couple households, 11.5% were households with a male householder and no spouse or partner present, and 8.2% were households with a female householder and no spouse or partner present. About 11.3% of all households were made up of individuals and 0.8% had someone living alone who was 65 years of age or older.

There were 2,364 housing units, of which 5.7% were vacant. The homeowner vacancy rate was 0.0% and the rental vacancy rate was 5.1%.

Racial composition as of the 2020 census
Race	Number	Percent
White	4,445	58.6%
Black or African American	678	8.9%
American Indian and Alaska Native	35	0.5%
Asian	488	6.4%
Native Hawaiian and Other Pacific Islander	173	2.3%
Some other race	340	4.5%
Two or more races	1,422	18.8%
Hispanic or Latino (of any race)	1,237	16.3%

=== 2000 census ===
At the 2000 census, there were 5,471 people, 1,632 households, and 1,589 families residing at Hickam. The population density was 4,419.0 inhabitants per square mile (1,706.2/km^{2}). There were 1,718 housing units at an average density of 1,387.7 per square mile (535.8/km^{2}). The racial makeup of the town was 66.2% White, 11.7% Black, 0.6% Native American, 8.2% Asian, 1.0% Pacific Islander, 4.1% from other races, and 8.3% from two or more races. 8.4% of the population were Hispanic or Latino of any race.

In 2000, of the 1,632 households, 73.3% had children under the age of 18 living with them, 90.9% were married couples living together, 3.8% had a female householder with no husband present, and 2.6% were non-families. 2.5% of households were one person, and 0.0% were one person aged 65 or older. The average household size was 3.35 and the average family size was 3.40.

On the base, the population was spread out, with 40.4% under the age of 18, 7.9% from 18 to 24, 45.5% from 25 to 44, 5.9% from 45 to 64, and 0.3% 65 or older. The median age was 26 years. For every 100 females, there were 102.3 males. For every 100 females age 18 and over, there were 100.2 males.

The median household income was at Hickam was $42,298, and the median family income was $41,989. Males had a median income of $30,588 versus $23,548 for females. The per capita income for the CDP was $15,039; 2.2% of the population and 2.1% of families were below the poverty line. Out of the total population, 2.6% of those under the age of 18 and 25.0% of those 65 and older were living below the poverty line.

== Climate ==
Hickam Housing has a tropical savanna climate (Köppen: Af).

Climate data for Hickam Housing
Month	Jan	Feb	Mar	Apr	May	Jun	Jul	Aug	Sep	Oct	Nov	Dec	Year
Mean daily maximum °C (°F)	23.7 (74.7)	23.3 (73.9)	23.5 (74.3)	24.0 (75.2)	24.9 (76.8)	25.6 (78.1)	26.1 (79.0)	26.5 (79.7)	26.6 (79.9)	26.2 (79.2)	25.3 (77.5)	24.3 (75.7)	25.0 (77.0)
Daily mean °C (°F)	22.8 (73.0)	22.5 (72.5)	22.6 (72.7)	23.1 (73.6)	23.9 (75.0)	24.7 (76.5)	25.2 (77.4)	25.6 (78.1)	25.7 (78.3)	25.3 (77.5)	24.5 (76.1)	23.5 (74.3)	24.1 (75.4)
Mean daily minimum °C (°F)	22.1 (71.8)	21.7 (71.1)	21.7 (71.1)	22.4 (72.3)	23.1 (73.6)	23.9 (75.0)	24.5 (76.1)	24.8 (76.6)	24.9 (76.8)	24.6 (76.3)	23.8 (74.8)	22.8 (73.0)	23.4 (74.0)
Average precipitation mm (inches)	30.5 (1.20)	29.0 (1.14)	39.3 (1.55)	16.5 (0.65)	16.1 (0.63)	12.3 (0.48)	9.3 (0.37)	13.6 (0.54)	11.9 (0.47)	20.1 (0.79)	32.9 (1.30)	45.0 (1.77)	276.5 (10.89)
Source: Weather.Directory

== Education ==
The Hawaii Department of Education operates public schools. Mokulele Elementary School is in the CDP.

The private Assets School has its K-8 campus in Hickam Housing CDP.

== See also ==
- Joint Base Pearl Harbor–Hickam
