= Waipiʻo Acres, Hawaii =

Census-designated place in Hawaii, United States

Waipiʻo Acres
- Census-designated place
- Location in Honolulu County and the state of Hawaii
- Coordinates: 21°28′7″N 158°0′57″W
- Country: United States
- State: Hawaii
- County: Honolulu

Area
  - Total: 0.98 sq mi (2.54 km^{2})
  - Land: 0.98 sq mi (2.54 km^{2})
  - Water: 0 sq mi (0.00 km^{2})
- Elevation: 735 ft (224 m)

Population (2020)
  - Total: 5,531
  - Density: 5,644.0/sq mi (2,179.17/km^{2})
- Time zone: UTC-10 (Hawaii-Aleutian)
- Area code: 808
- FIPS code: 15-80000
- GNIS feature ID: 0364894

Waipiʻo Acres is a census-designated place (CDP) in Honolulu County, Hawaiʻi, United States. The population was 5,531 at the 2020 census.

== Geography ==
Waipiʻo Acres is located at 21°28′7″N 158°0′57″W (21.468700, -158.015722).

According to the United States Census Bureau, the CDP has a total area of 1.0 square mile (2.6 km^{2}), all of it land.

== Demographics ==
Historical population
Census	Pop.	Note	%±
2020	5,531		—
U.S. Decennial Census

As of the census of 2000, there were 5,298 people, 1,823 households, and 1,292 families residing in the CDP. The population density was 5,061.9 inhabitants per square mile (1,954.4/km^{2}). There were 1,951 housing units at an average density of 1,864.0 per square mile (719.7/km^{2}). The racial makeup of the CDP was 18.86% White, 5.21% African American, 0.36% Native American, 36.77% Asian, 8.19% Pacific Islander, 2.11% from other races, and 28.50% from two or more races. Hispanic or Latino of any race were 11.74% of the population.

There were 1,823 households, out of which 36.0% had children under the age of 18 living with them, 51.0% were married couples living together, 13.2% had a female householder with no husband present, and 29.1% were non-families. 21.9% of all households were made up of individuals, and 3.3% had someone living alone who was 65 years of age or older. The average household size was 2.89 and the average family size was 3.41.

In the CDP the population was spread out, with 27.2% under the age of 18, 10.3% from 18 to 24, 34.4% from 25 to 44, 19.1% from 45 to 64, and 9.0% who were 65 years of age or older. The median age was 32 years. For every 100 females there were 105.0 males. For every 100 females age 18 and over, there were 101.8 males.

The median income for a household in the CDP was $49,594, and the median income for a family was $56,737. Males had a median income of $36,923 versus $24,913 for females. The per capita income for the CDP was $19,251. About 9.8% of families and 10.6% of the population were below the poverty line, including 15.1% of those under age 18 and 3.7% of those age 65 or over.
