= Troy Hashimoto =

American politician

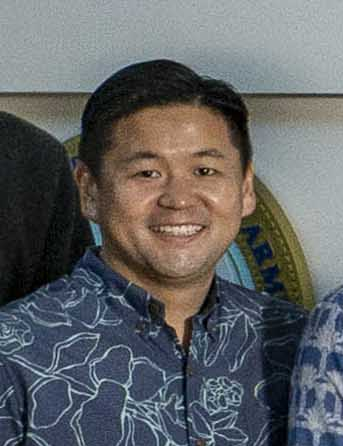
- Hashimoto in 2023

Member of the Hawaii Senate from the 5th district
- Incumbent
- Assumed office November 9, 2023
- Appointed by: Josh Green
- Preceded by: Gilbert Keith-Agaran

Member of the Hawaii House of Representatives from the 10th district 8th (2018–2022)
- In office April 17, 2018 – November 9, 2023
- Preceded by: Joseph Souki
- Succeeded by: Tyson Miyake

Personal details
- Born: 1987 or 1988 (age 38–39)
- Party: Democratic
- Education: University of Denver

Troy Noboru Hashimoto (born September 21, 1987) is an American politician who currently represents the 5th district in the Hawaii Senate. He previously served in the Hawaii House of Representatives, first elected after longtime incumbent Democrat Joseph Souki resigned after allegations of sexual assault by several women. He previously was executive assistant to Maui County Council Chair Mike White.

In November 2023, Hashimoto was appointed to represent District 5 in the Hawaii Senate following the resignation of Democrat Gilbert Keith-Agaran.

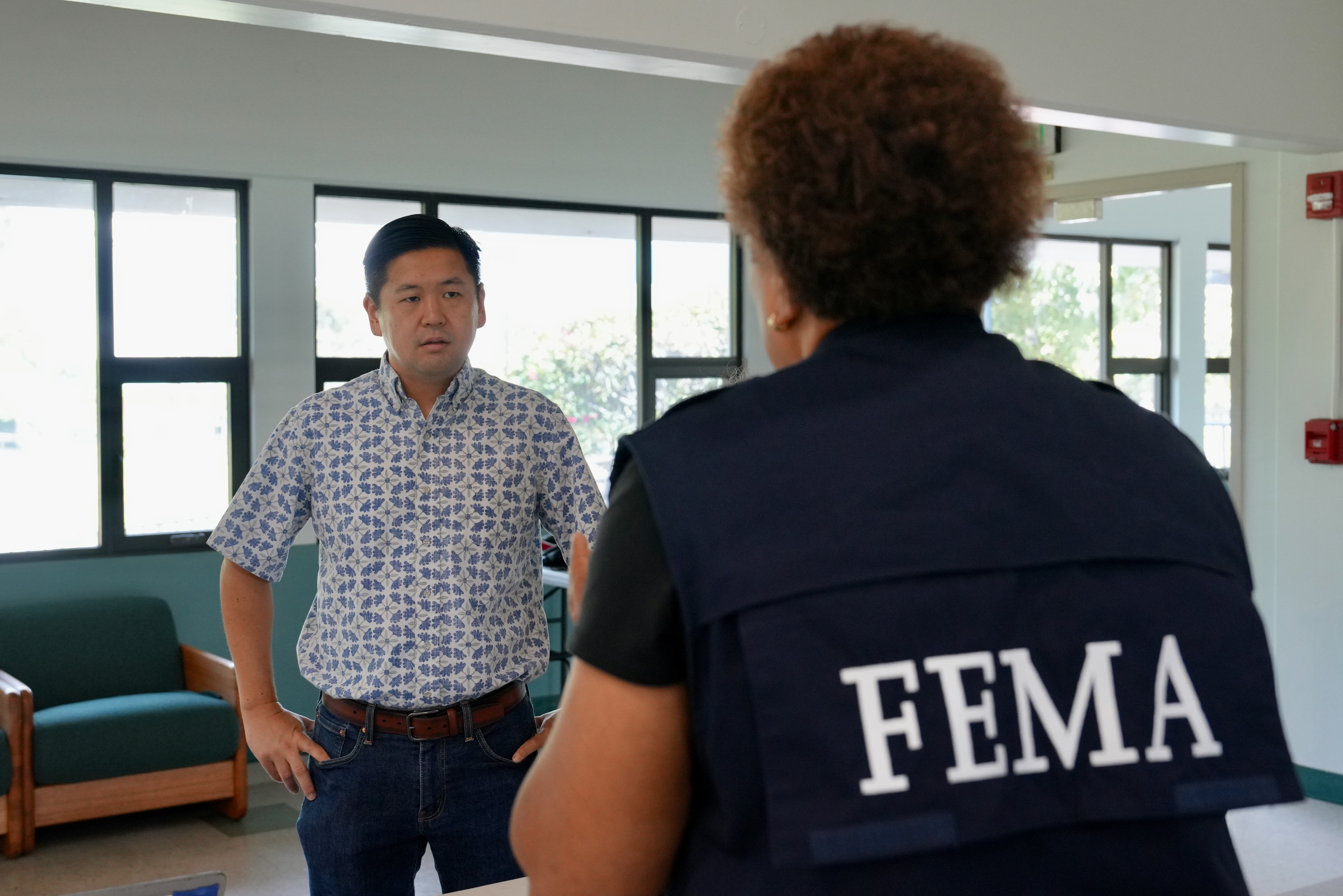
Maui, Hawaii (Aug. 14, 2023) - Hawaii State Representative Troy Hashimoto visits the FEMA Disaster Recovery Center.
