= Nāhiku, Hawaii =

Unincorporated community in Hawaii, United States

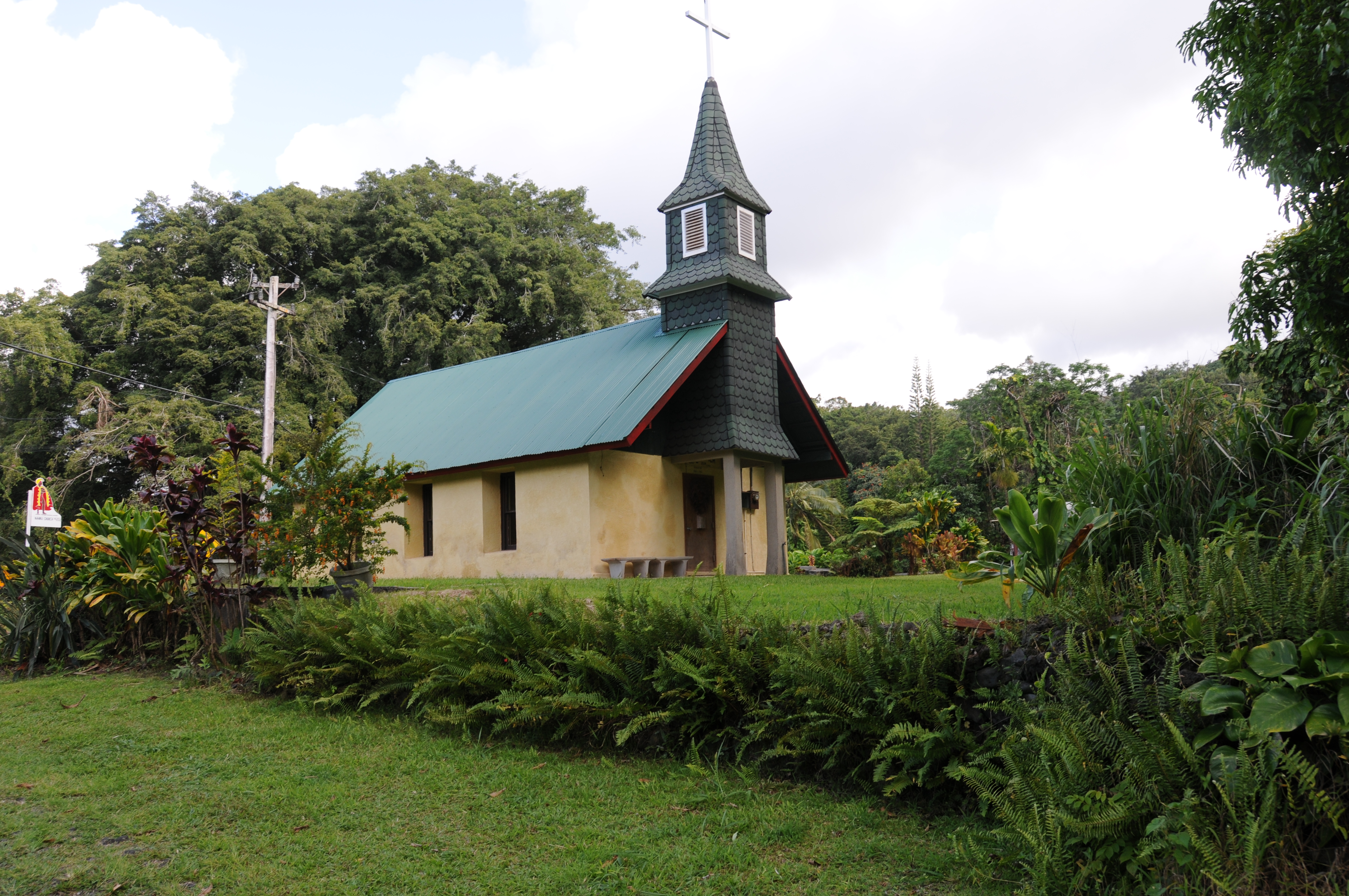
Church is a main building in Nāhiku

Nāhiku is a small unincorporated community in eastern Maui, Hawaii. Nāhiku is located along the Hana Road on the way to Hana at 20°49′28″N 156°5′29″W. Village has two parts: Upper Nāhiku closer to the road and Lower Nāhiku near the ocean shore.

Nāhiku is usually reached by Nāhiku Road coming down from the Hana Road to Opuhano Point on Honolulunui Bay.

The wooden bridge to the Nāhiku ocean shore within the last half mile of the road was closed to motor vehicles in 2014.

Some Nāhiku residents have been upset at tourist traffic after the area started appearing in Maui, Hawaii tourism guide books and web sites.
