= Kahakuloa, Hawaii =

Place in West Maui, Hawaii

Coordinates: 20°59′59″N 156°33′14″W

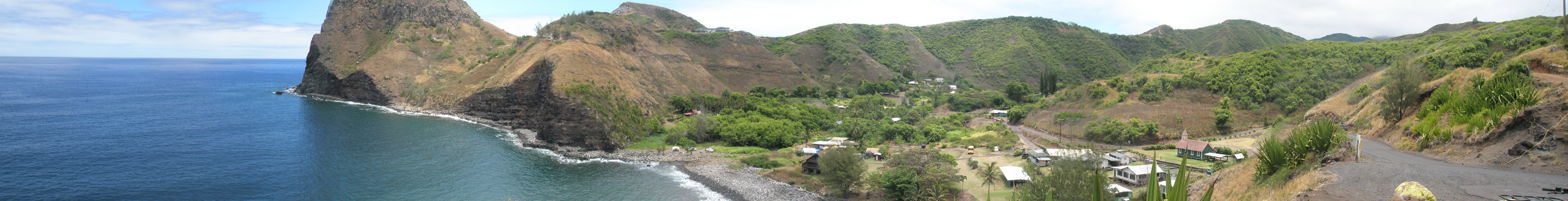
Kahakuloa

Kahakuloa (Hawaiian for 'the tall lord') is an area on the north side of West Maui, Hawaii. It is home to the community of Kahakuloa Village,

East of the village, at the point, is 646 ft. high. Kahekili, (c. 1737–1794) was said to leap 200 feet down to the water from this hill in the mornings before eating breakfast, from a spot called "Kahekili's Leap." The next hill, Pu'u Kahuli'anapa, is 547 ft. high.

It is accessible via Kahekili Highway (State Highway 340).
