= Pālolo, Hawaii =

Neighborhood in Honolulu, Hawaii, United States

Pālolo
- Neighborhood
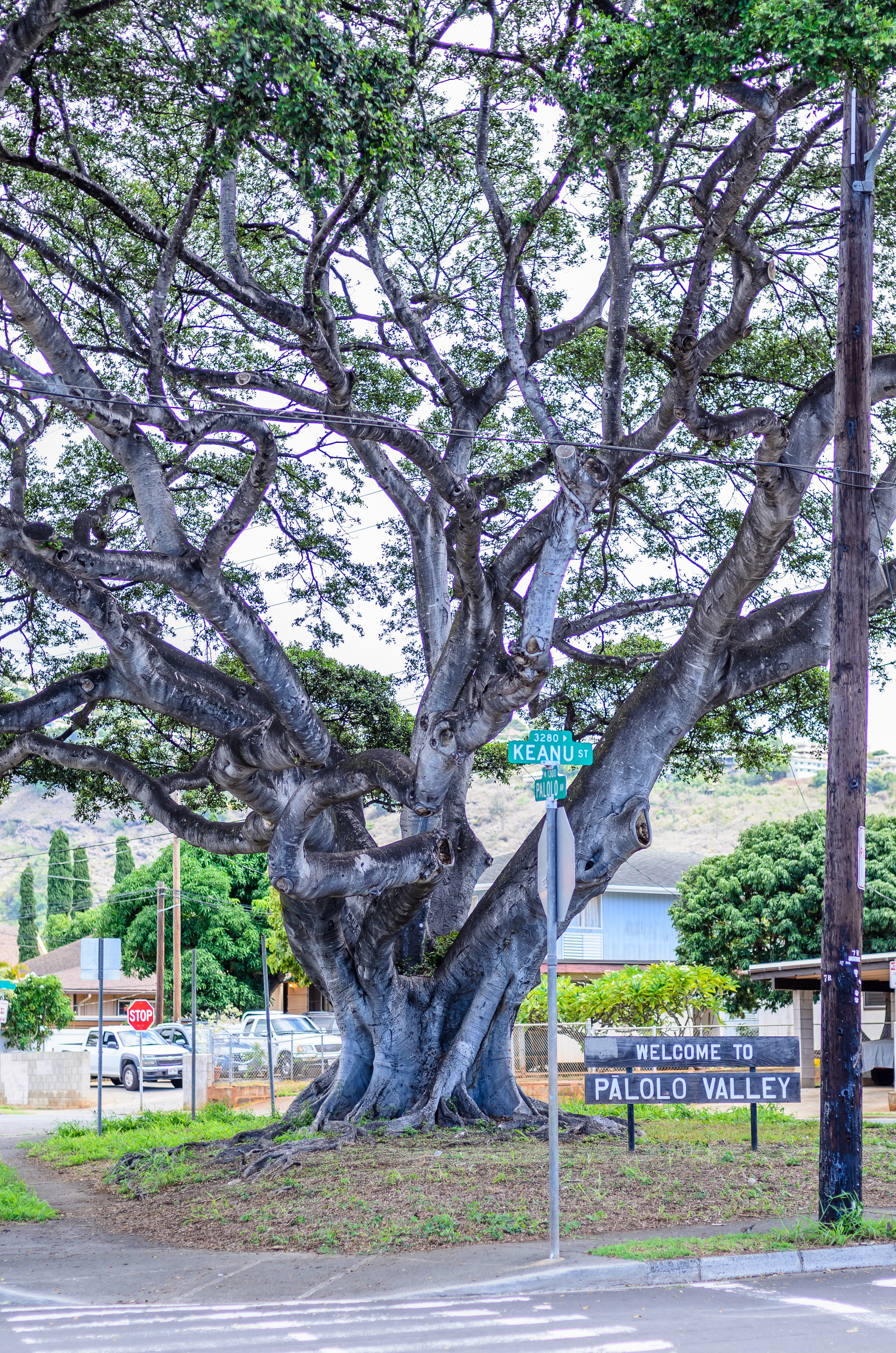
- Welcome sign in Pālolo

- Location on Oʻahu, Hawaii Pālolo (Hawaii)
- Coordinates: 21°17′44.8″N 157°47′48.4″W
- Country: United States
- State: Hawaii
- County: Honolulu
- City: Honolulu

Government
  - Mayor: Rick Blangiardi
  - Council: Members: 1. Kymberly Marcos Pine; 2. Ernest Y. Martin; 3. Ikaika Anderson; 4. Trevor Ozawa; 5. Ann Kobayashi; 6. Carol Fukunaga; 7. Joey Manahan; 8. Brandon Elefante; 9. Ron Menor
  - State Senate District HI-10: Les Ihara Jr.
  - State House District HI-20: Jackson Sayama
  - Pālolo Neighborhood Board: Members: 1. Randolph C. Hack (Chair); 2. Beverly K.S. Mau (Vice Chair); 3. Darlene H. Nakayama (Secretary); 4. Earl Shiraki (Sergeant-at-Arms); 5. Barbra J. Armentrout (Treasurer); 6. Paul Holtrop; 7. Rusti J. Onishi; 8. Mark Leo; 9. Bradley T. Rentz; 10. Joshua Robert Frost

Area
  - Total: 2,612 acres (1,057 ha)

Population (2020)
  - Total: 13,297
  - Density: 24,485/sq mi (9,454/km^{2})
- Time zone: UTC−10 (Hawaiian (HST))
- Zip Code: 96816
- Area code: 808

Pālolo is the name of a valley, stream, and residential neighborhood in Honolulu, Hawaii, the United States. The area lies approximately four miles east and inland from downtown Honolulu, less than a mile from Diamond Head. Like many of Hawaii's neighborhoods, Pālolo consists of an entire valley. The mauka (mountain-side) of the valley is agricultural in nature. The makai (ocean-side) of the valley ends approximately at Waiʻalae Avenue and is densely settled, mostly with single-family homes.

In the Hawaiian land use system, Pālolo is an ʻili of the Waikīkī ahupuaʻa in moku of Kona (Honolulu).

Pālolo includes the Kaʻau Crater, an extinct volcano in the mountains at the back of the valley.

Pālolo Stream runs through the valley before joining Manoa stream to form the Mānoa-Pālolo drainage canal, which flows into the Ala Wai Canal. In the Hawaiian language, pālolo means "clay".

Jarrett Middle School and Pālolo Elementary School are located in Pālolo.

Pālolo Valley is bordered on the mauka end by the Koʻolau Range, to the Koko Head (approximately East) side by Wilhelmina Rise, on the makai end by the neighborhood of Kaimuki, and on the ʻEwa (approximately west) side by Waʻahila Ridge.
