= Gilbert Keith-Agaran =

American politician

Gil Keith-Agaran
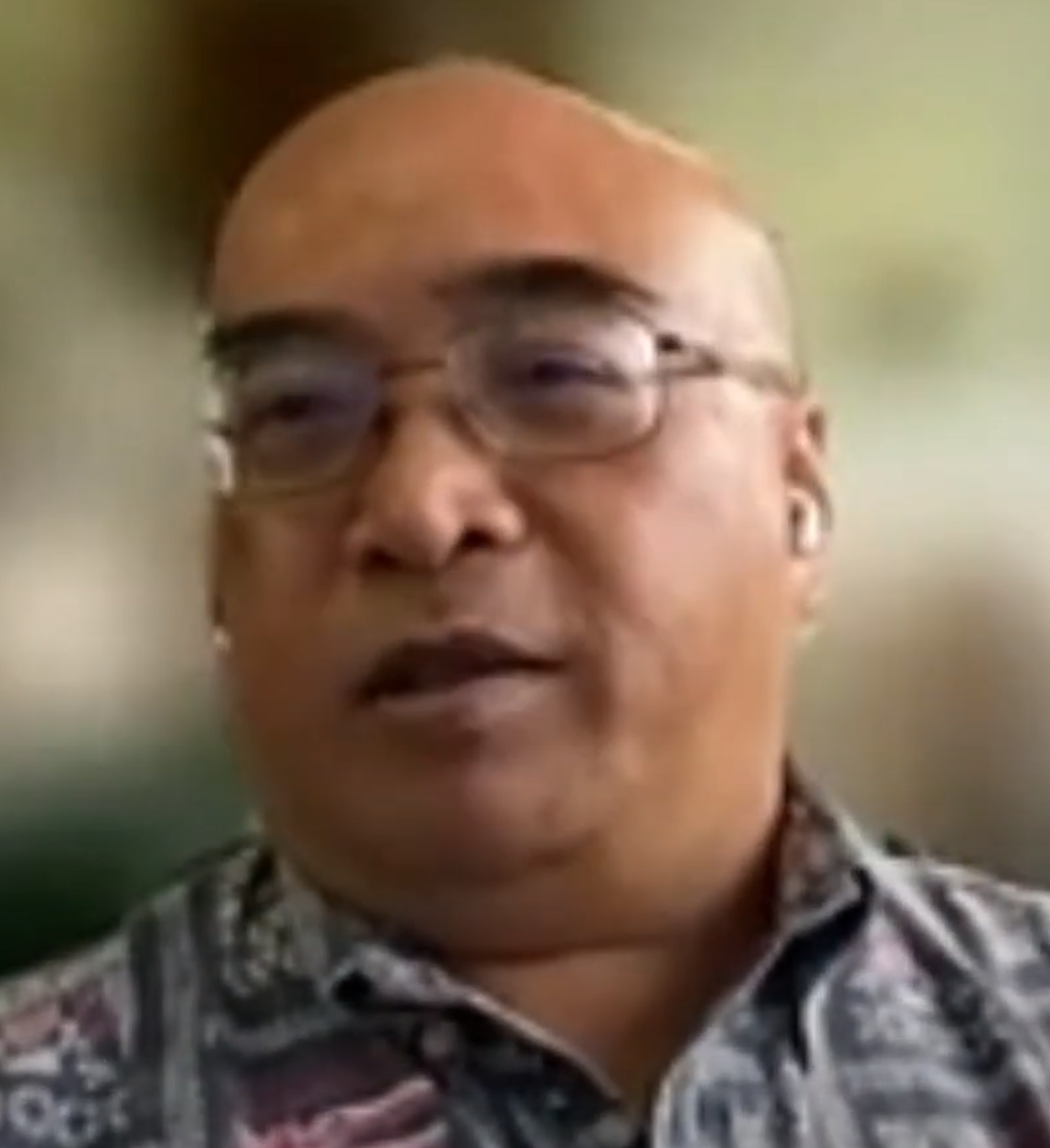

Member of the Hawaii Senate from the 5th district
- In office January 10, 2013 – October 31, 2023
- Appointed by: Neil Abercrombie
- Preceded by: Shan Tsutsui
- Succeeded by: Troy Hashimoto

Member of the Hawaii House of Representatives from the 9th district
- In office January 14, 2009 – January 10, 2013
- Appointed by: Linda Lingle
- Preceded by: Bob Nakasone
- Succeeded by: Justin Woodson

Personal details
- Born: September 27, 1962 (age 63) Wailuku, Hawaii, U.S.
- Party: Democratic
- Education: Yale University (BA); University of California, Berkeley (JD)

Gilbert Samuel Coloma Keith-Agaran (born September 27, 1962) is an American attorney and politician who served as a member of the Hawaii Senate, representing the 5th district from 2013 to 2023. He previously represented the 9th district in the Hawaii House of Representatives from 2009 to 2013.

== Early life and education ==
Keith-Agaran was born in Wailuku, Hawaii. After graduating from Maui High School, he earned a Bachelor of Arts degree from Yale University and a Juris Doctor from the UC Berkeley School of Law.

== Career ==
After graduating from law school, Keith-Agaran returned to Hawaii, eventually working as a partner at Takitani Agaran Jorgensen & Wildman LLLP. He served as the first deputy director of the Hawaii Department of Land and Natural Resources, director of the Hawaii Department of Labor and Industrial Relations, and as the deputy director of the Hawaii Department of Commerce and Consumer Affairs.

In January 2009, Keith-Agaran was appointed by Governor Linda Lingle to serve out the rest of the term of Representative Bob Nakasone, who died on December 7, 2008. Keith-Agaran served as a member of the Hawaii House of Representatives from 2009 to 2013.

In January 2013, Governor Neil Abercrombie appointed Keith-Agaran to the Hawaii State Senate to represent the seat for District 5, which was vacated by Shan Tsutsui. Since 2014, Keith-Agaran has served as chair of the Senate Judiciary Committee. In the 2013–2014 legislative session, he served as vice chair of the Senate Tourism and Hawaiian Affairs Committee. Since 2019, he has also served as vice chair of the Senate Ways and Means Committee and Senate Water and Land Committee.

In August 2023, Keith-Agaran announced his resignation from the Hawaii Senate, effective October 31, 2023.
