= Whitmore Village, Hawaii =

Census-designated place in Hawaii, United States

Whitmore Village
- Census-designated place
- Location in Honolulu County and the state of Hawaii
- Coordinates: 21°30′52″N 158°1′31″W
- Country: United States
- State: Hawaii
- County: Honolulu

Area
  - Total: 0.92 sq mi (2.37 km^{2})
  - Land: 0.91 sq mi (2.36 km^{2})
  - Water: 0.0077 sq mi (0.02 km^{2})
- Elevation: 1,001 ft (305 m)

Population (2020)
  - Total: 4,887
  - Density: 5,367.6/sq mi (2,072.46/km^{2})
- Time zone: UTC-10 (Hawaii-Aleutian)
- ZIP code: 96786
- Area code: 808
- FIPS code: 15-80900
- GNIS feature ID: 0364987

Whitmore Village is a census-designated place (CDP) in Honolulu County, Hawaiʻi, United States. The population was 4,887 at the 2020 census.

== Geography ==
Whitmore Village is located at 21°30′52″N 158°1′31″W (21.514550, -158.025358).

According to the United States Census Bureau, the CDP has a total area of 0.9 square miles (2.3 km^{2}), of which 0.9 square miles (2.3 km^{2}) is land and 1.08% is water.

== Demographics ==
Historical population
Census	Pop.	Note	%±
2000	4,057		—
2010	4,499		10.9%
2020	4,887		8.6%
U.S. Decennial Census

=== 2020 census ===
As of the 2020 census, Whitmore Village had a population of 4,887. The median age was 36.0 years. 23.6% of residents were under the age of 18 and 15.5% of residents were 65 years of age or older. For every 100 females there were 92.9 males, and for every 100 females age 18 and over there were 90.8 males age 18 and over.

100.0% of residents lived in urban areas, while 0.0% lived in rural areas.

There were 1,142 households in Whitmore Village, of which 45.0% had children under the age of 18 living in them. Of all households, 52.5% were married-couple households, 14.6% were households with a male householder and no spouse or partner present, and 25.9% were households with a female householder and no spouse or partner present. About 13.3% of all households were made up of individuals and 5.9% had someone living alone who was 65 years of age or older.

There were 1,183 housing units, of which 3.5% were vacant. The homeowner vacancy rate was 1.0% and the rental vacancy rate was 3.1%.

Racial composition as of the 2020 census
Race	Number	Percent
White	244	5.0%
Black or African American	9	0.2%
American Indian and Alaska Native	3	0.1%
Asian	3,055	62.5%
Native Hawaiian and Other Pacific Islander	425	8.7%
Some other race	60	1.2%
Two or more races	1,091	22.3%
Hispanic or Latino (of any race)	404	8.3%

=== 2000 census ===
At the 2000 census there were 4,057 people, 940 households, and 818 families living in the CDP. The population density was 4,411.5 inhabitants per square mile (1,703.3/km^{2}). There were 991 housing units at an average density of 1,077.6 per square mile (416.1/km^{2}). The racial makup of the CDP was 5.10% White, 0.44% African American, 0.10% Native American, 65.89% Asian, 6.53% Pacific Islander, 0.96% from other races, and 20.98% from two or more races. Hispanic or Latino of any race were 7.59%.

Of the 940 households 43.6% had children under the age of 18 living with them, 64.8% were married couples living together, 14.6% had a female householder with no husband present, and 12.9% were non-families. 9.8% of households were one person and 5.5% were one person aged 65 or older. The average household size was 4.28 and the average family size was 4.39.

The age distribution was 29.9% under the age of 18, 9.6% from 18 to 24, 27.5% from 25 to 44, 19.9% from 45 to 64, and 13.1% 65 or older. The median age was 34 years. For every 100 females there were 101.1 males. For every 100 females age 18 and over, there were 99.0 males.

The median household income was $52,308 and the median family income was $55,508. Males had a median income of $27,885 versus $23,139 for females. The per capita income for the CDP was $14,315. About 7.5% of families and 11.1% of the population were below the poverty line, including 13.9% of those under age 18 and 11.4% of those age 65 or over.

== Education ==
Hawaii Department of Education operates Helemano Elementary School in Whitmore Village CDP.
