= St. Louis Heights =

Neighborhood of Honolulu, Hawaii, United States

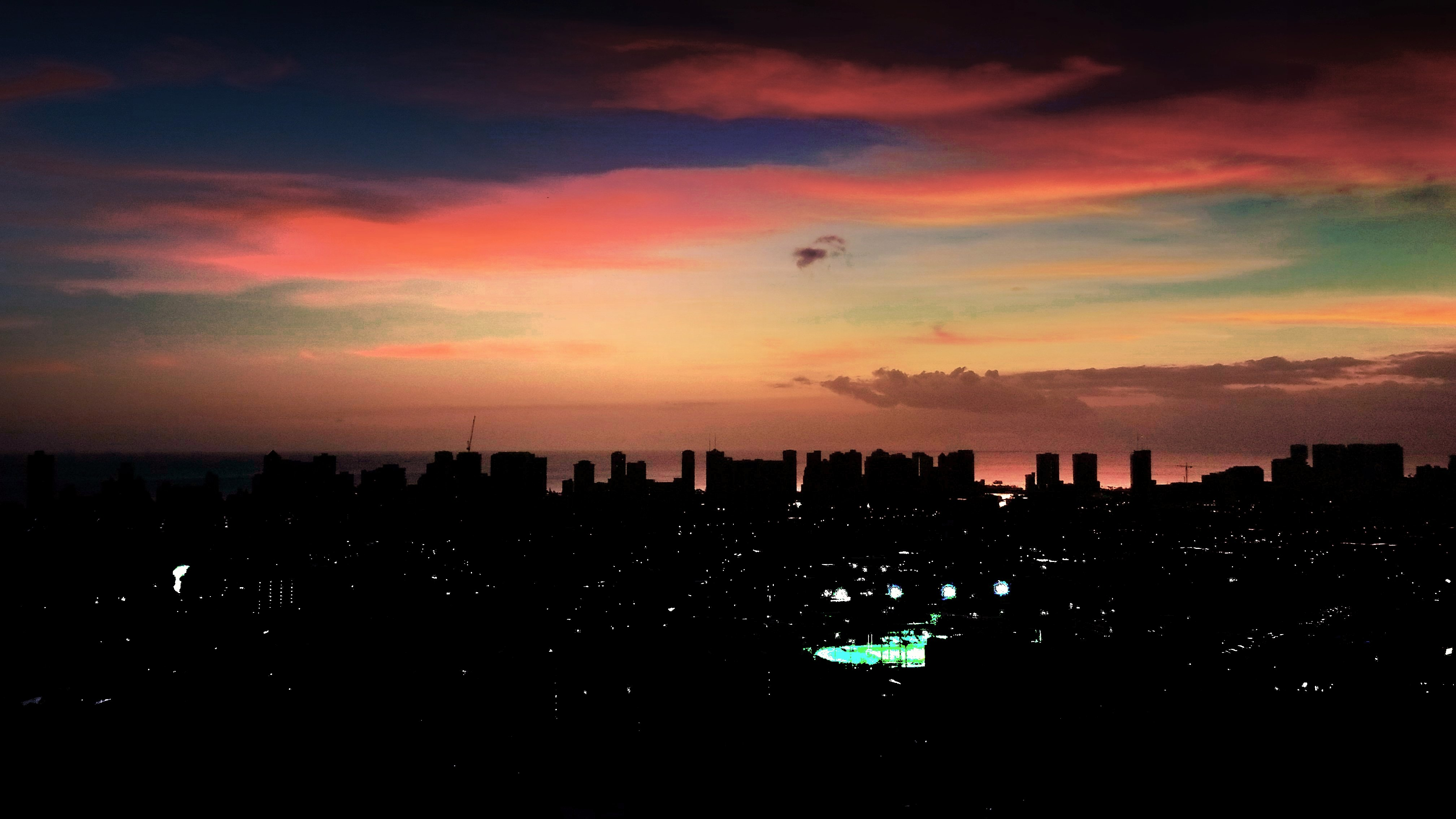
The view of Honolulu from St. Louis Heights

St. Louis Heights is a neighborhood in District V of Honolulu CDP, City and County of Honolulu, Hawaii, on the island of Oahu.

== Geography ==
The neighborhood sits on a hillside with views across Downtown Honolulu and the Pacific Ocean. The main road in the district is St. Louis Drive.

== Education ==
- Hokulani Elementary School
- Chaminade University
- Punahou, and Iolani Schools
- Saint Louis School
- Sacred Hearts Academy
- St. Patrick’s School
- Star of The Sea

== Politics ==
St. Louis Heights is part of Hawaii's 1st congressional district and District 21 in the Hawaii House of Representatives.
