= Nicole Lowen =

American politician from Hawaii

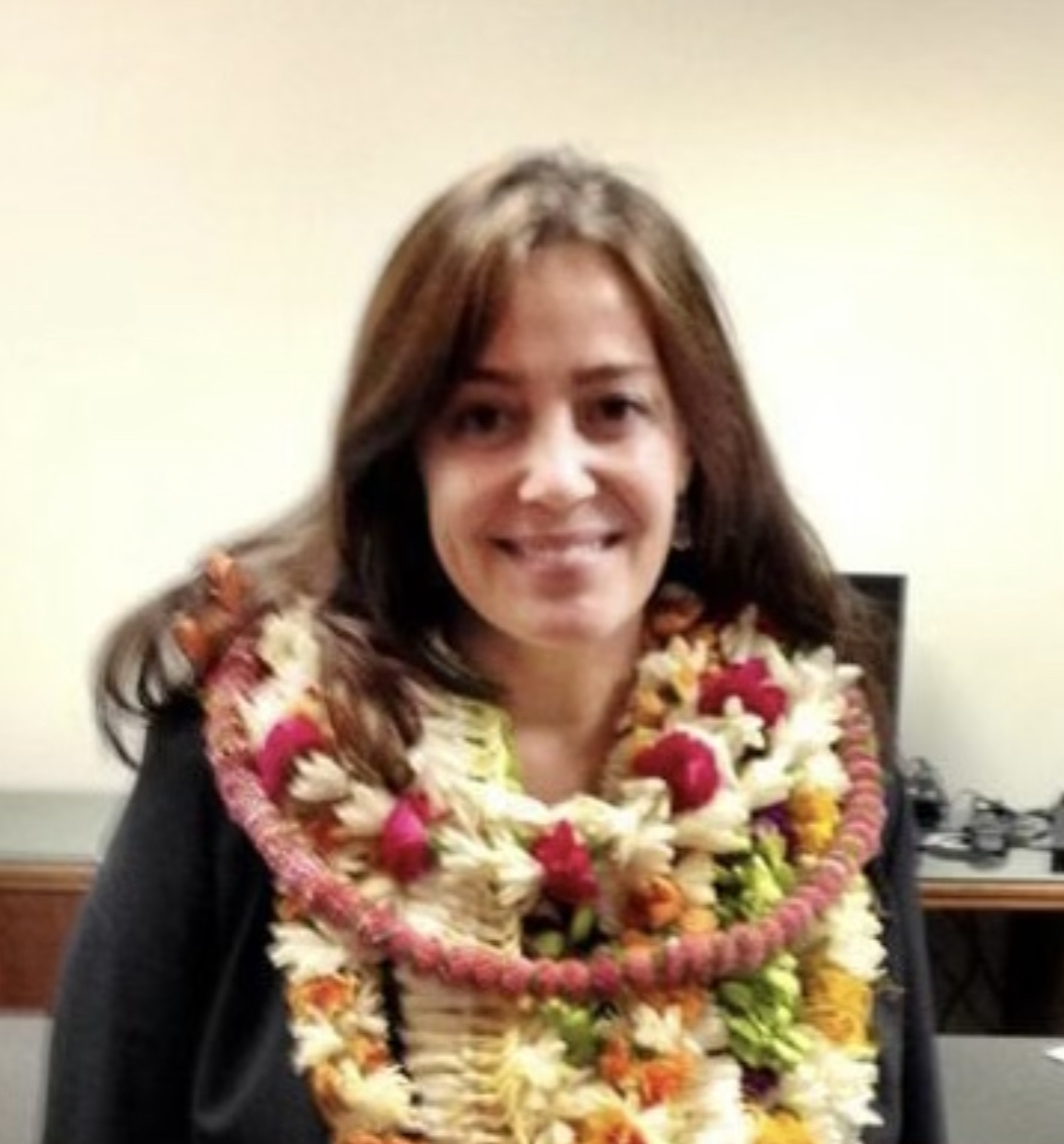

Member of the Hawaii House of Representatives
- Incumbent
- Assumed office November 6, 2012
- Preceded by: Constituency established
- Constituency: 6th District (2012–2022); 7th District (2022–Present)

Personal details
- Born: November 6, 1972 (age 53) Washington, D.C., U.S.
- Party: Democratic
- Education: University of Pennsylvania; University of Hawaii
- Website: nicolelowen.com

Nicole Elizabeth Lowen is an American politician and a Democratic member of the Hawaii House of Representatives since November 6, 2012, representing District 7.

== Early life and education ==
Lowen was born in Washington, D.C., and earned her bachelor's degree in United States history from the University of Pennsylvania and her master's degree in urban and regional planning from the University of Hawaii. She is Jewish.

== Elections ==
- 2012 With Democratic Representative Denny Coffman redistricted to District 5, Lowen won the four-way District 6 August 11, 2012, Democratic Primary by 45 votes with 1,067 votes (30.2%), and won the November 6, 2012, General election with 5,336 votes (63.9%) against Republican nominee Roy Ebert.
