= Punchbowl Crater =

Extinct tuff cone in Honolulu, Hawaii, United States of America

Coordinates: 21°18′55″N 157°50′55″W

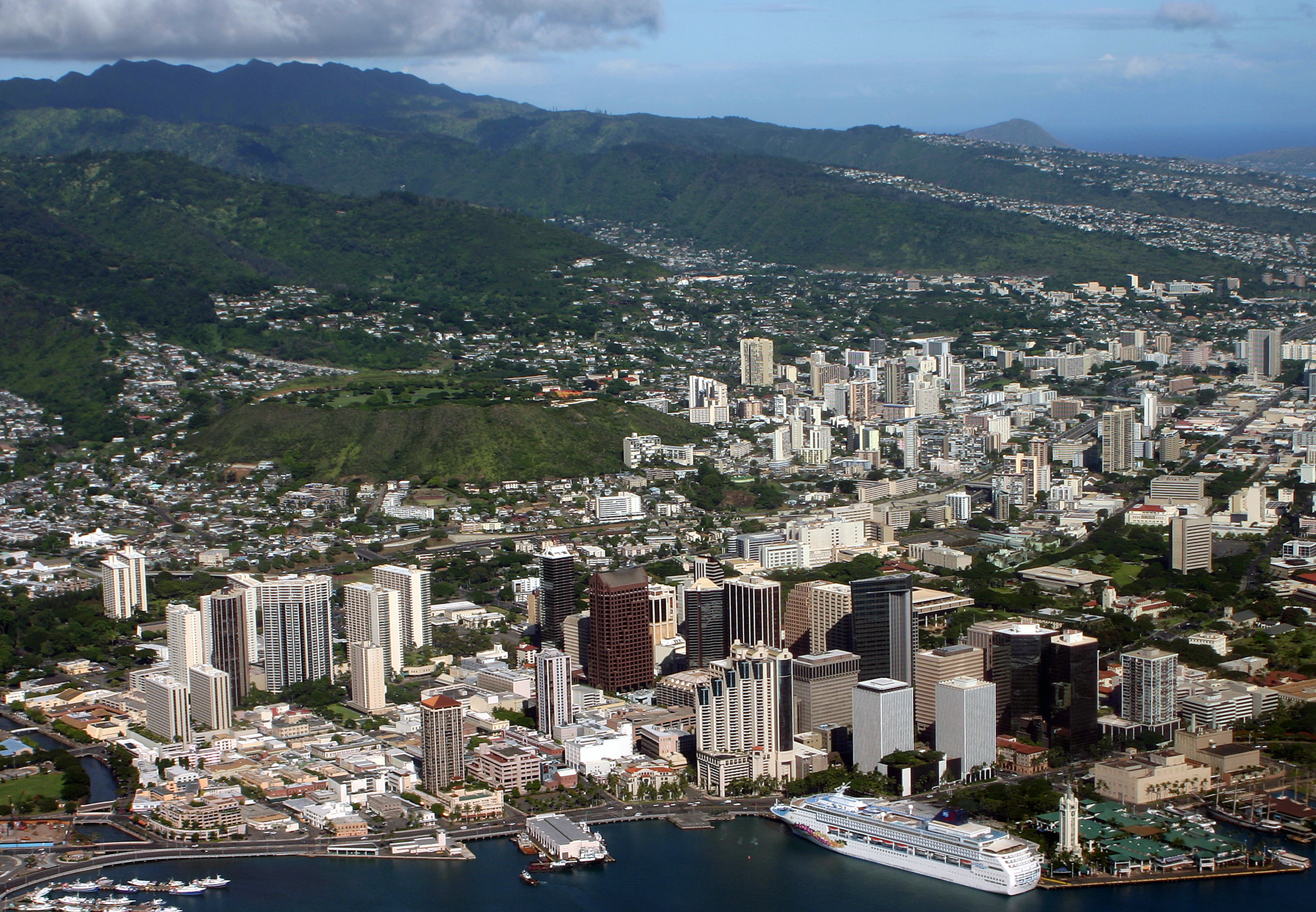
Punchbowl Crater (Center left)

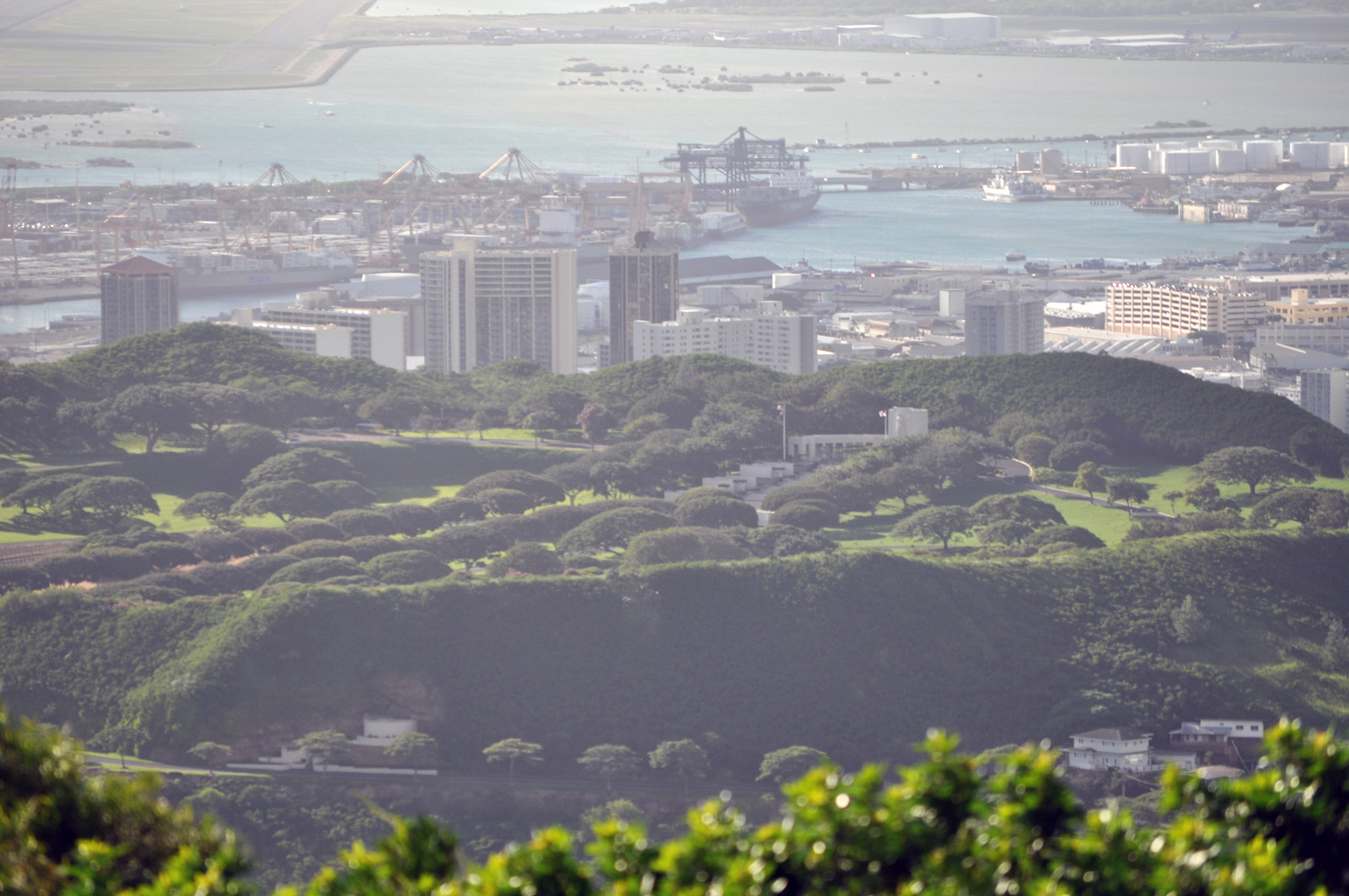
Punchbowl Crater

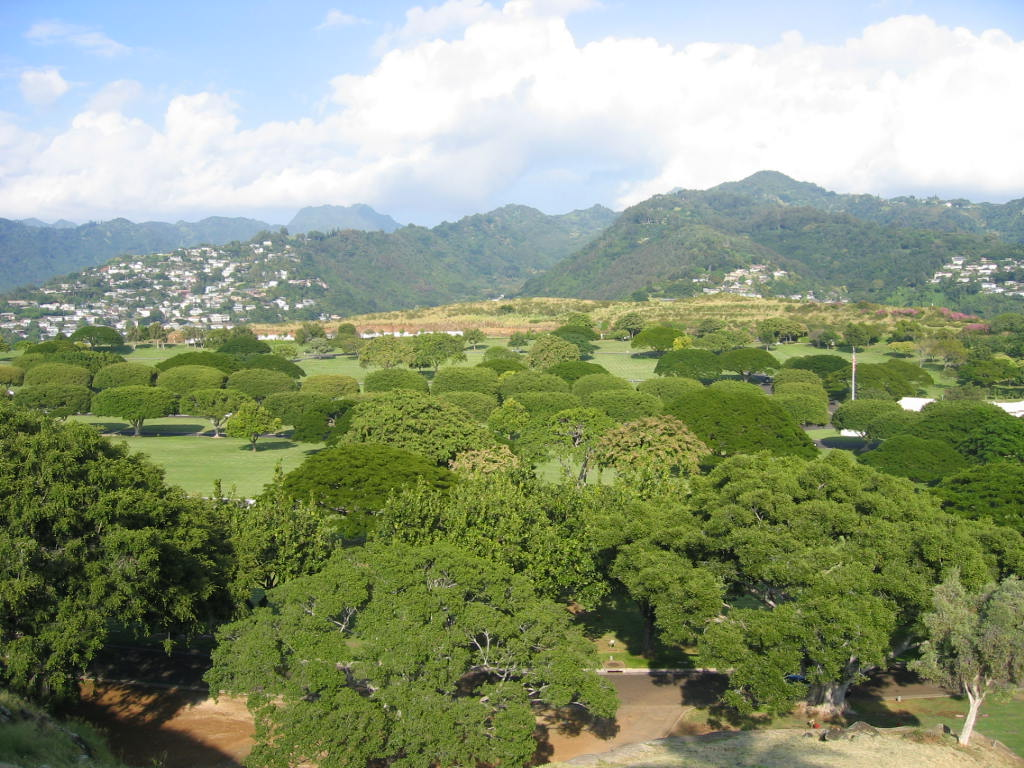
The National Memorial Cemetery of the Pacific occupies Punchbowl Crater.

Punchbowl Crater is an extinct volcanic tuff cone located in Honolulu, Hawaii, United States. It is the location of the National Memorial Cemetery of the Pacific.

== Geological history ==
The crater was formed some 75,000 to 100,000 years ago during the secondary activity of the Honolulu Volcanic Series. A crater resulted from the ejection of hot lava through cracks in the old coral reefs which, at the time, extended to the foot of the Koʻolau Mountain Range. The volcano is most likely a monogenetic volcano, meaning that it only erupted once.

== Name and early uses ==
Although there are various translations of the Punchbowl's Hawaiian name, "Pūowaina," the most common is "Hill of Sacrifice." This translation closely relates to the history of the crater. The first known use was as an altar where Hawaiians offered human sacrifices to their gods and killed violators of the many taboos. Later, during the reign of Kamehameha the Great, a battery of two cannons was mounted at the rim of the crater to salute distinguished arrivals and signify important occasions. Early in the 1880s, leasehold land on the slopes of the Punchbowl opened for settlement and in the 1930s, the crater was used as a rifle range for the Hawaii National Guard. Anti-aircraft guns located there were fired during the Japanese attack December 7, 1941. The US Navy built the Nimitz Bowl in 1944 in Punchbowl Crater for USO Hawaii shows and sports. Toward the end of World War II, tunnels were dug through the rim of the crater for the placement of shore batteries to guard Honolulu Harbor and the south edge of Pearl Harbor.

== National Memorial Cemetery of the Pacific ==
During the late 1890s, a committee recommended that the Punchbowl become the site for a new cemetery to accommodate the growing population of Honolulu. The idea was rejected for fear of polluting the water supply and the emotional aversion to creating a city of the dead above a city of the living. Fifty years later, Congress authorized a small appropriation to establish a national cemetery in Honolulu with two provisions: that the location be acceptable to the War Department, and that the site would be donated rather than purchased. In 1943, the governor of Hawaii offered the Punchbowl for a national cemetery. The $50,000 appropriation proved insufficient, however, and the project was deferred until after World War II. By 1947, Congress and veteran organizations placed a great deal of pressure on the military to find a permanent burial site in Hawaii for the remains of thousands of World War II servicemen on the island of Guam awaiting permanent burial. Subsequently, the Army again began planning the Punchbowl cemetery; in February 1948 Congress approved funding and construction began.

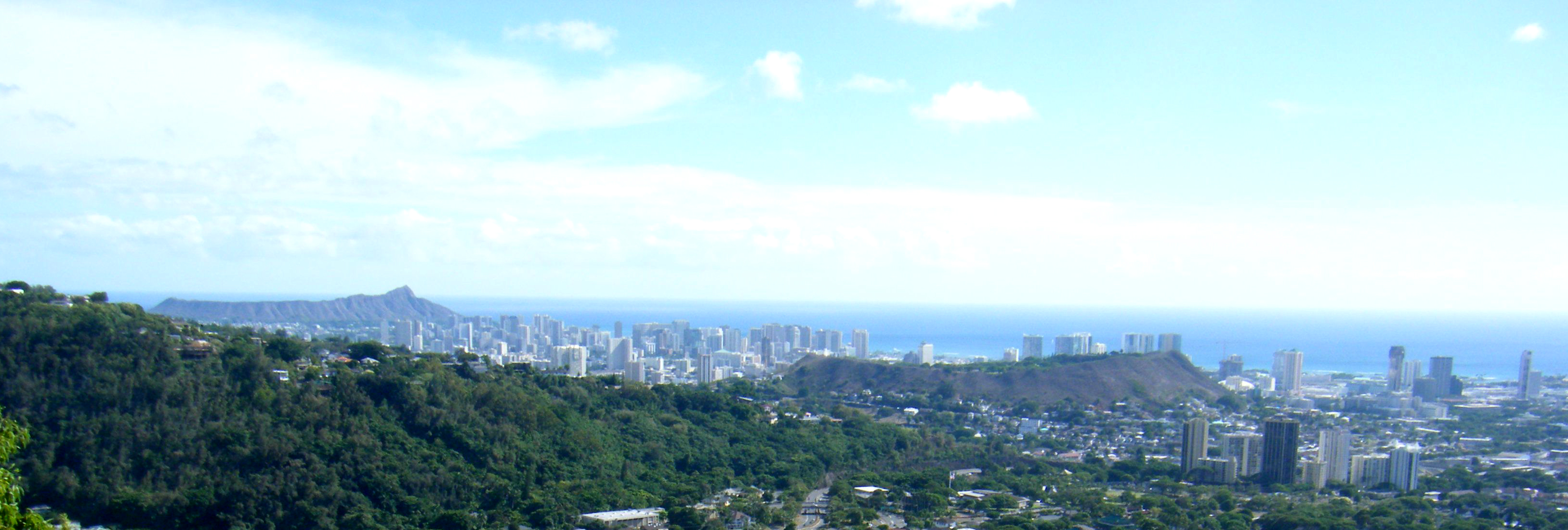
Diamond Head, Punchbowl Crater and Honolulu from Na Pueo park
