= Mililani Mauka, Hawaii =

Census-designated place in Hawaii, United States

Mililani Mauka
- Census-designated place
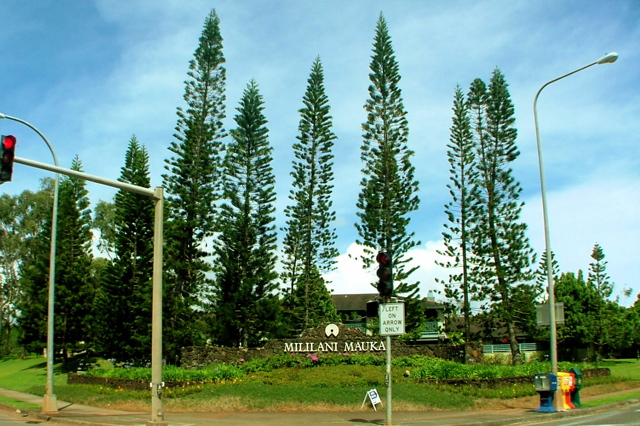
- Mililani Mauka, the newer area of Mililani located on the mountain, or mauka, side of the H-2 freeway

- Location within Oahu Location within Hawaii
- Coordinates: 21°28′32″N 157°59′40″W
- Country: United States
- State: Hawaii

Area
  - Total: 4.00 sq mi (10.35 km^{2})
  - Land: 4.00 sq mi (10.35 km^{2})
  - Water: 0 sq mi (0.00 km^{2})
- Elevation: 880 ft (270 m)

Population (2020)
  - Total: 21,075
  - Density: 5,276.3/sq mi (2,037.19/km^{2})
- Time zone: UTC-10 (Hawaii-Aleutian)
- Area code: 808
- FIPS code: 15-51000

Mililani Mauka is a census-designated place (CDP) in Honolulu County, Hawaii on the island of Oʻahu, Hawaii, United States. As of the 2020 census, the CDP had a population of 21,075.

== History ==
Mililani Mauka is a planned community adjacent to Mililani Town, both situated about 10 miles (16 km) northwest of the center of Honolulu. Ground was broken for Mililani Mauka on April 6, 1990, east of Interstate H-2 from Mililani Town. The first homeowners moved into Mauka in 1992. The community is the future site of the Oahu Arts Center.

== Geography ==
Mililani Mauka is located at 21°28′32″N 157°59′40″W (21.4756, -157.9947). According to the United States Census Bureau, the CDP has a total area of 4.0 square miles (10.3 km^{2}), all land. Mililani Mauka lies within the ʻEwa Moku on Oʻahu, more specifically the Waipiʻo Ahupuaʻa.

== Demographics ==
=== 2020 census ===
As of the 2020 census, Mililani Mauka had a population of 21,075. The median age was 40.6 years. 23.7% of residents were under the age of 18 and 12.4% of residents were 65 years of age or older. For every 100 females there were 100.8 males, and for every 100 females age 18 and over there were 97.9 males age 18 and over.

The population density was 5,276.7 inhabitants per square mile.

100.0% of residents lived in urban areas, while 0.0% lived in rural areas.

There were 7,392 households in Mililani Mauka, of which 39.5% had children under the age of 18 living in them. Of all households, 63.1% were married-couple households, 13.8% were households with a male householder and no spouse or partner present, and 17.6% were households with a female householder and no spouse or partner present. About 18.8% of all households were made up of individuals and 8.5% had someone living alone who was 65 years of age or older.

There were 7,655 housing units, of which 3.4% were vacant. The homeowner vacancy rate was 0.4% and the rental vacancy rate was 6.4%.

The most reported ancestries were Japanese (44.3%), Filipino (25.9%), Chinese (19.9%), Native Hawaiian (17.4%), Irish (10.8%), and German (10.7%).

Racial composition as of the 2020 census
Race	Number	Percent
White	2,881	13.7%
Black or African American	452	2.1%
American Indian and Alaska Native	32	0.2%
Asian	10,422	49.5%
Native Hawaiian and Other Pacific Islander	627	3.0%
Some other race	317	1.5%
Two or more races	6,344	30.1%
Hispanic or Latino (of any race)	2,079	9.9%

=== Income ===
The median household income was $119,981, with families having $136,755, married couples having $145,145, and non-families having $59,413. 2.8% of the population was in poverty, with 2.8% of people under 18, 2.6% of people between the ages of 18 and 64, and 4.0% of people 65 or older were in poverty. The per capita income was $46,908.

Historical population
Census	Pop.	Note	%±
2020	21,075		—
U.S. Decennial Census

== Education ==
Hawaii Department of Education operates public schools within the CDP.

Mililani Mauka is home to Mililani Mauka Elementary School, Mililani ʻIke Elementary School, and Mililani Middle School.
