= Mōʻiliʻili, Hawaii =

Neighborhood of Honolulu, Hawaii, United States

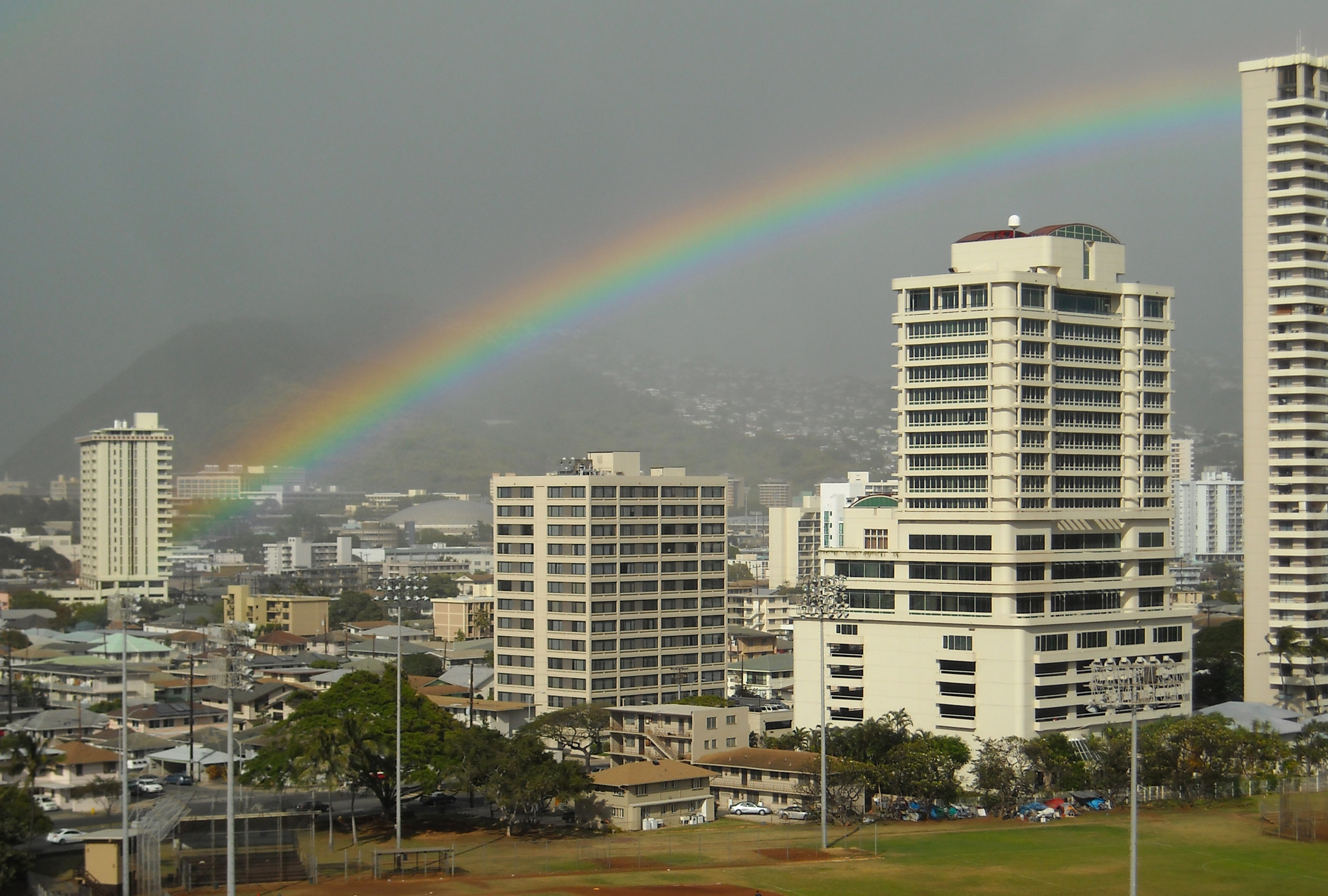
Rainbow over Mōʻiliʻili

Mōʻiliʻili, Hawaii is a neighborhood of Honolulu CDP, City and County of Honolulu, Hawaii, on the island of Oahu. Its name means "pebble lizard" in Hawaiian.

The commercial district at South King Street and University Avenue in Mōʻiliʻili is the closest such district to the University of Hawaiʻi at Mānoa. The H-1 Freeway is between University of Hawaiʻi at Mānoa and the business district.

== History ==
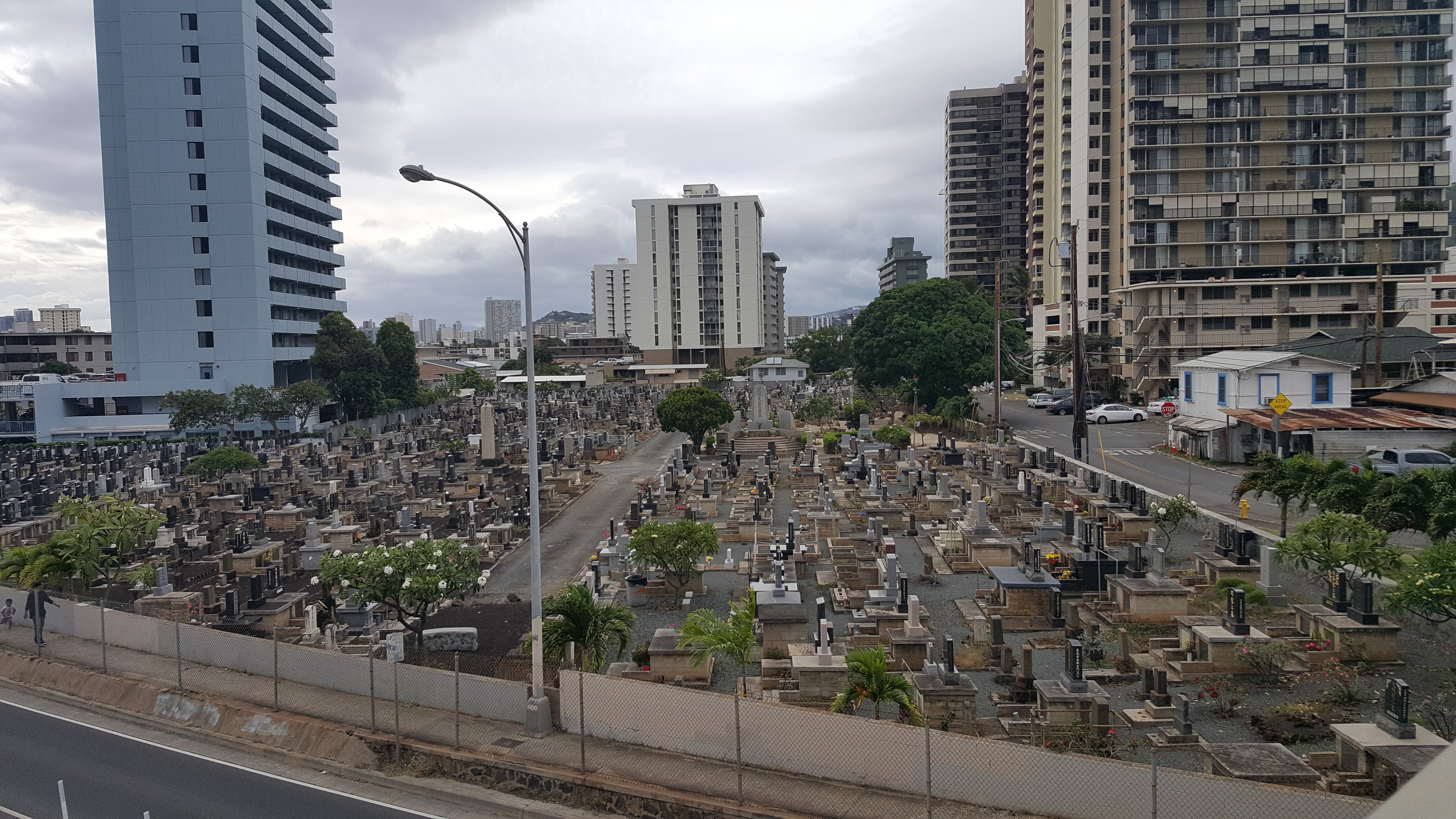
Japanese cemetery in Mōʻiliʻili

The community changed from an agriculture-centered town to an urban area in the early 20th century. 80% of Mōʻiliʻili's population was of Japanese origin as of the 1930 U.S. Census. The development of the H-1 Freeway took away commercial traffic that previously patronized Mōʻiliʻili's businesses.

For 40 years before 2007, various members of the local community considered developing Mōʻiliʻili into a college town environment. Around 2002, Evan Dobelle, the president of the University of Hawaiʻi System, said he would prioritize developing a college town. He also discussed moving the UH system offices from University of Hawaiʻi at Mānoa to Mōʻiliʻili. In 2007, Kamehameha Schools bought 1.7 acres (0.69 ha) of land from Pacific Theatres, including the Varsity Theatre and the Varsity Office Building, increasing its landholdings in Mōʻiliʻili to 11.4 acres (4.6 ha), mostly along South King Street and University Avenue. The Varsity Theatre, in operation since 1939, was demolished in 2008.

== Description ==
The small community, composed of numerous small businesses such as florists, imported goods, ethnic food, and surf gear and apparel, centers on the area of University Avenue and King Street, 21°17′30″N 157°49′19″W.

Beneath the intersection of South King Street and University Avenue is a complex system of caves known as the Mōʻiliʻili Karst. Originally the underwater stream was fed by the Manoa stream, but it has since been rerouted. A natural pond formed and the Willows restaurant centered on it. But construction at the UH athletic fields and surrounding businesses caused collapses and rerouting of the underground waterway, forcing the owners to cement the pond, making it artificial. Several species of fish and plant life live in the caves. This cave system is not open to spelunkers and is accessible only by a city sewer grate.

== Transportation ==
The area is serviced by Honolulu's TheBus service, including routes 1/1L, 4, 5, 6, 13, and 18.

== Education ==
Hawaii Department of Education operates public schools in the area, including King William Lunalilo Elementary School, Prince Jonah Kūhiō Elementary School, and Queen Kaʻahumanu Elementary School. Several charter and private schools also exist, including Voyager Public Charter School and ʻIolani School. Maryknoll School and Punahou School are near the border of the Mānoa neighborhood.

== Parks and recreation ==
The City and County of Honolulu operates Mōʻiliʻili Neighborhood Park.

The Mōʻiliʻili Community Center was established around 1950 and originated from the Mōʻiliʻili Japanese Language School, a Japanese-language school established by Kihachi and Shika Kashiwabara in 1906. At its pre-World War II peak, the school had over 1,000 students. Non-Japanese persons transferred board positions to non-Japanese and had a Boy Scout troop moved into one of the school's buildings to prevent the school from being confiscated during the war. The Mōʻiliʻili Community Association received the school's lands and assets in 1945, leading to the establishment of the community center. In 1996 the community center had programs for 660 children and about 600 adults of all ages.

== See also ==
- Marco Polo condo fire
