= Politics of Hawaii =

The politics of the U.S. state of Hawaii are typically dominated by the Democratic Party. The Democratic Party of Hawaii was formed in 1900, by supporters of Queen Liliʻuokalani. For the first half of the twentieth century, the Republican Party ruled comfortably, dominating local politics until the end of World War II. After the war, Honolulu police officer John A. Burns began organizing plantation laborers, including many Japanese and Filipino Americans and built a coalition that gradually strengthened the Democratic Party in Hawaii. This culminated in the Hawaii Democratic Revolution of 1954, after which Republican political influence in the islands was greatly diminished.

United States presidential election results for Hawaii
Year	Republican		Democratic		Third party(ies)	
Year	No.	%	No.	%	No.	%
1960	92,295	49.97%	92,410	50.03%	0	0.00%
1964	44,022	21.24%	163,249	78.76%	0	0.00%
1968	91,425	38.70%	141,324	59.83%	3,469	1.47%
1972	168,865	62.48%	101,409	37.52%	0	0.00%
1976	140,003	48.06%	147,375	50.59%	3,923	1.35%
1980	130,112	42.90%	135,879	44.80%	37,296	12.30%
1984	185,050	55.10%	147,154	43.82%	3,642	1.08%
1988	158,625	44.75%	192,364	54.27%	3,472	0.98%
1992	136,822	36.70%	179,310	48.09%	56,710	15.21%
1996	113,943	31.64%	205,012	56.93%	41,165	11.43%
2000	137,845	37.46%	205,286	55.79%	24,820	6.75%
2004	194,191	45.26%	231,708	54.01%	3,114	0.73%
2008	120,566	26.58%	325,871	71.85%	7,131	1.57%
2012	121,015	27.84%	306,658	70.55%	7,024	1.62%
2016	128,847	30.04%	266,891	62.22%	33,199	7.74%
2020	196,864	34.27%	366,130	63.73%	11,475	2.00%
2024	193,661	37.48%	313,044	60.59%	9,996	1.93%

As a result, Hawaii's congressional politics have been dominated by Democrats since statehood in 1959. The state has elected just one Republican U.S. senator, Hiram Fong, who served from 1959 to 1977, and two Republican House members. The rest have been Democrats. Only two Republicans have been elected governor, and Linda Lingle was the only one to be re-elected, in 2006.

Hawaii has supported Democrats in every presidential election in which it has participated except 1972 and 1984, when incumbent Republican candidates won 49-state landslides. In 2008, Barack Obama, the first candidate to have been born in Hawaii, won the state by his largest margin, receiving 72% of the vote to 27% for his Republican rival John McCain. Obama again won Hawaii by an overwhelming margin in 2012, winning by 71% to 28% over Republican Mitt Romney. Hawaii again gave a larger vote share to Obama than any of the 49 other states. In subsequent presidential elections, Democratic candidates have continued to carry the state by large margins, though the Republican share of the vote has gradually increased, reaching 37% in 2024.

== State government ==
The Hawaii state government is composed of a bicameral system, with the Hawaii Senate and the Hawaii House of Representatives making up the upper and lower houses.

== Federal representation ==
Hawaii is currently represented in the Senate by Democrats Mazie Hirono and Brian Schatz. In the House, Democrats Ed Case (HI-1) and Jill Tokuda (HI-2) represent the state.

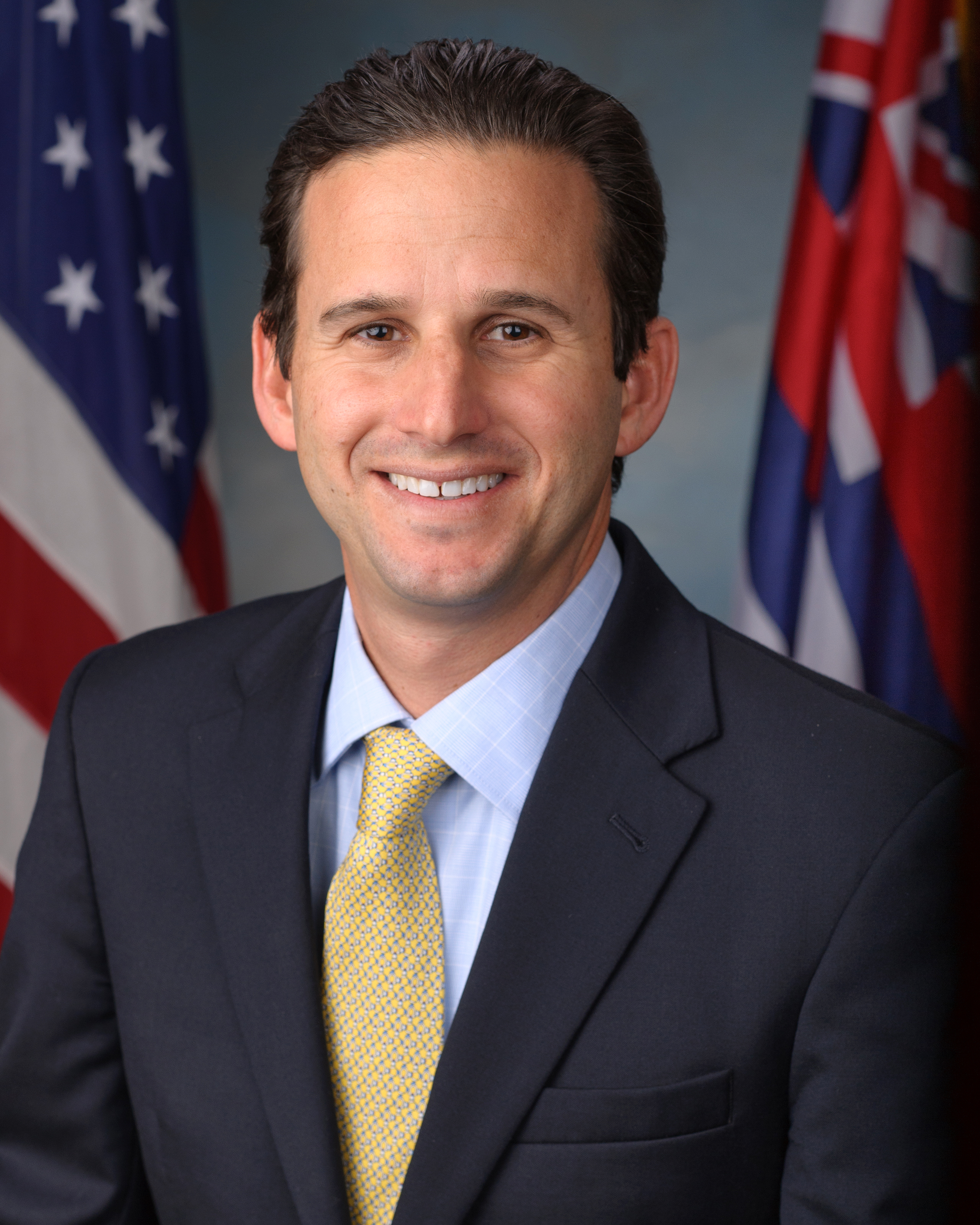
Brian Schatz
U.S. Senior Senator
(Democrat)

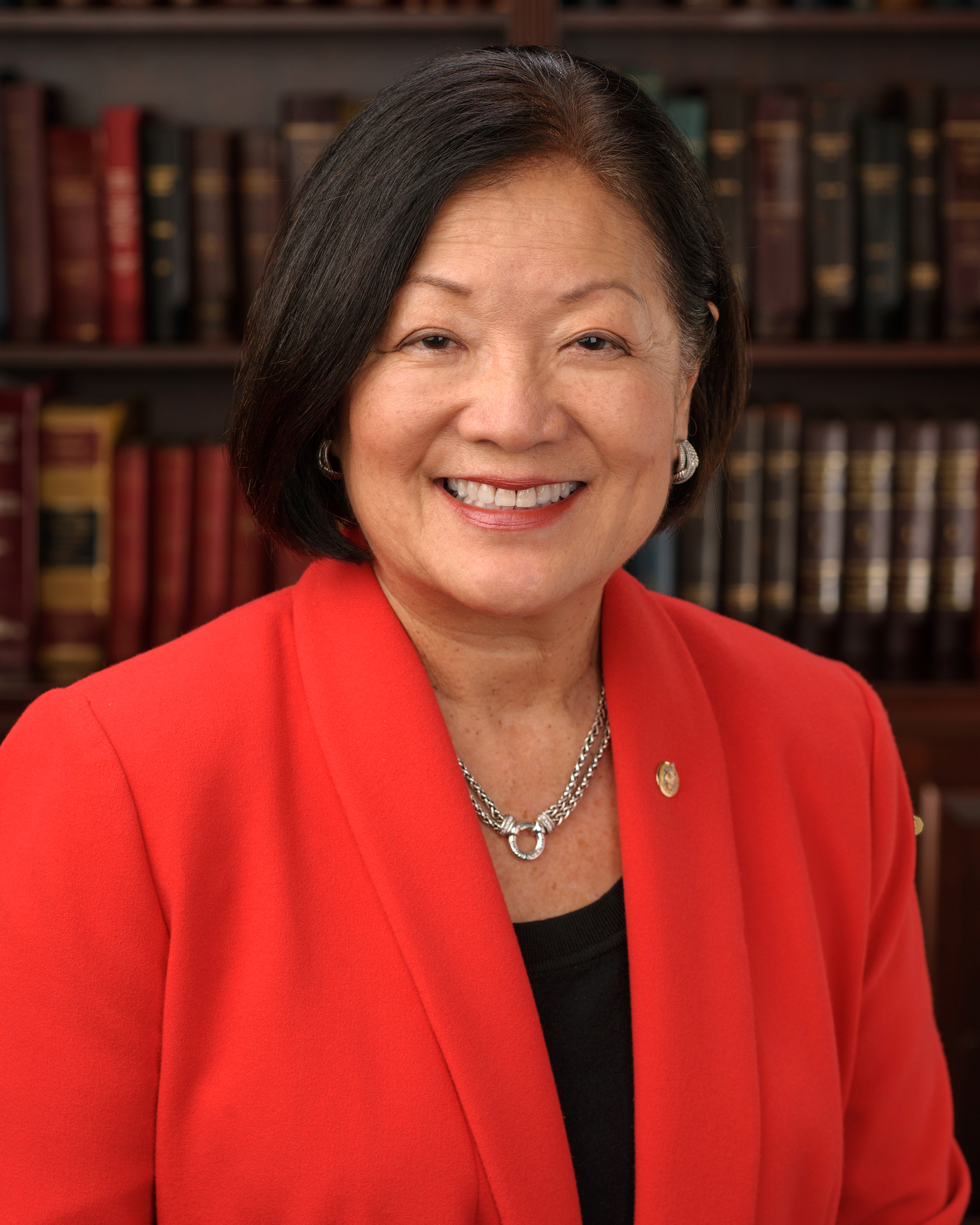
Mazie Hirono
U.S. Junior Senator
(Democrat)

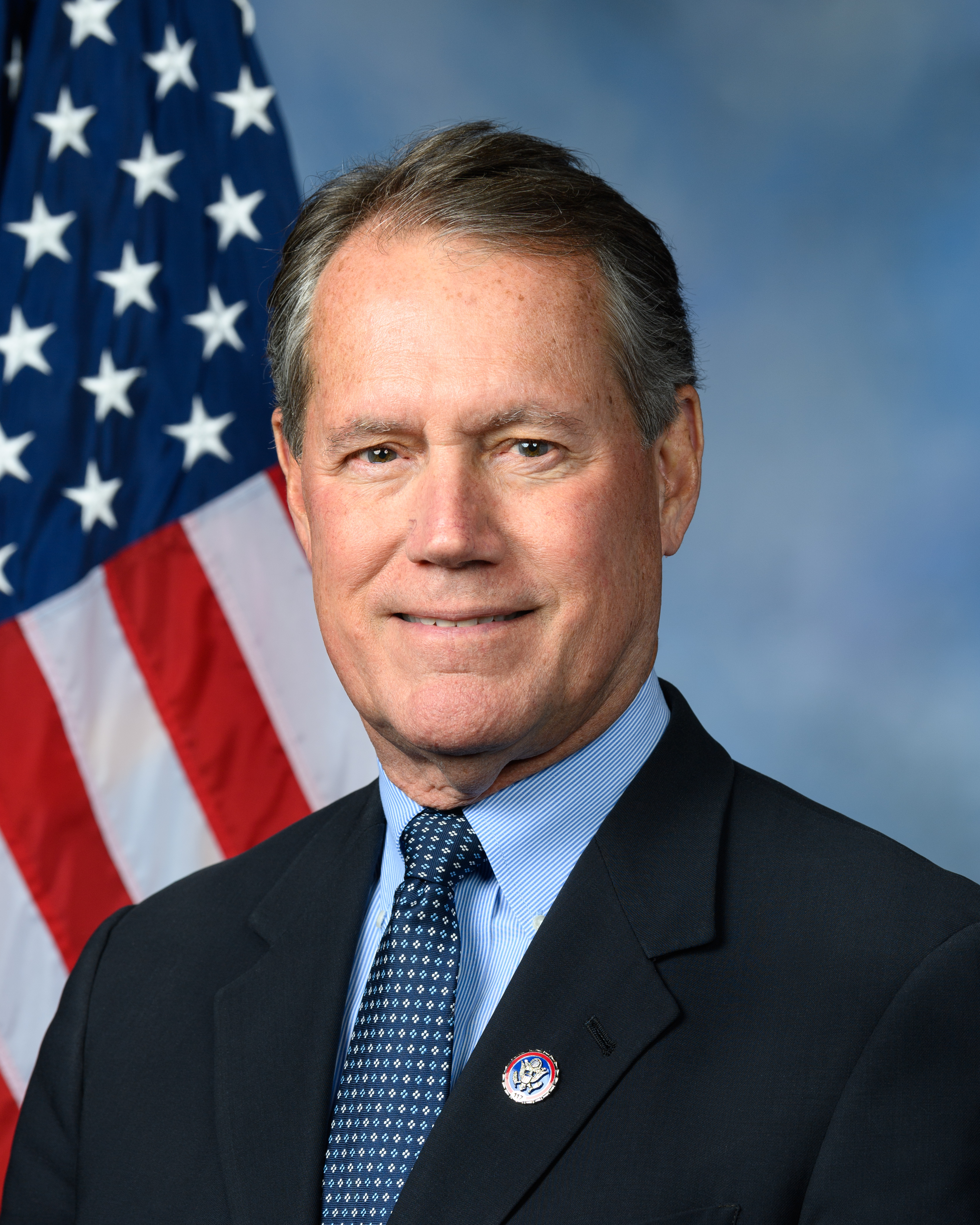
Ed Case
U.S. Representative HI-01
(Democrat)

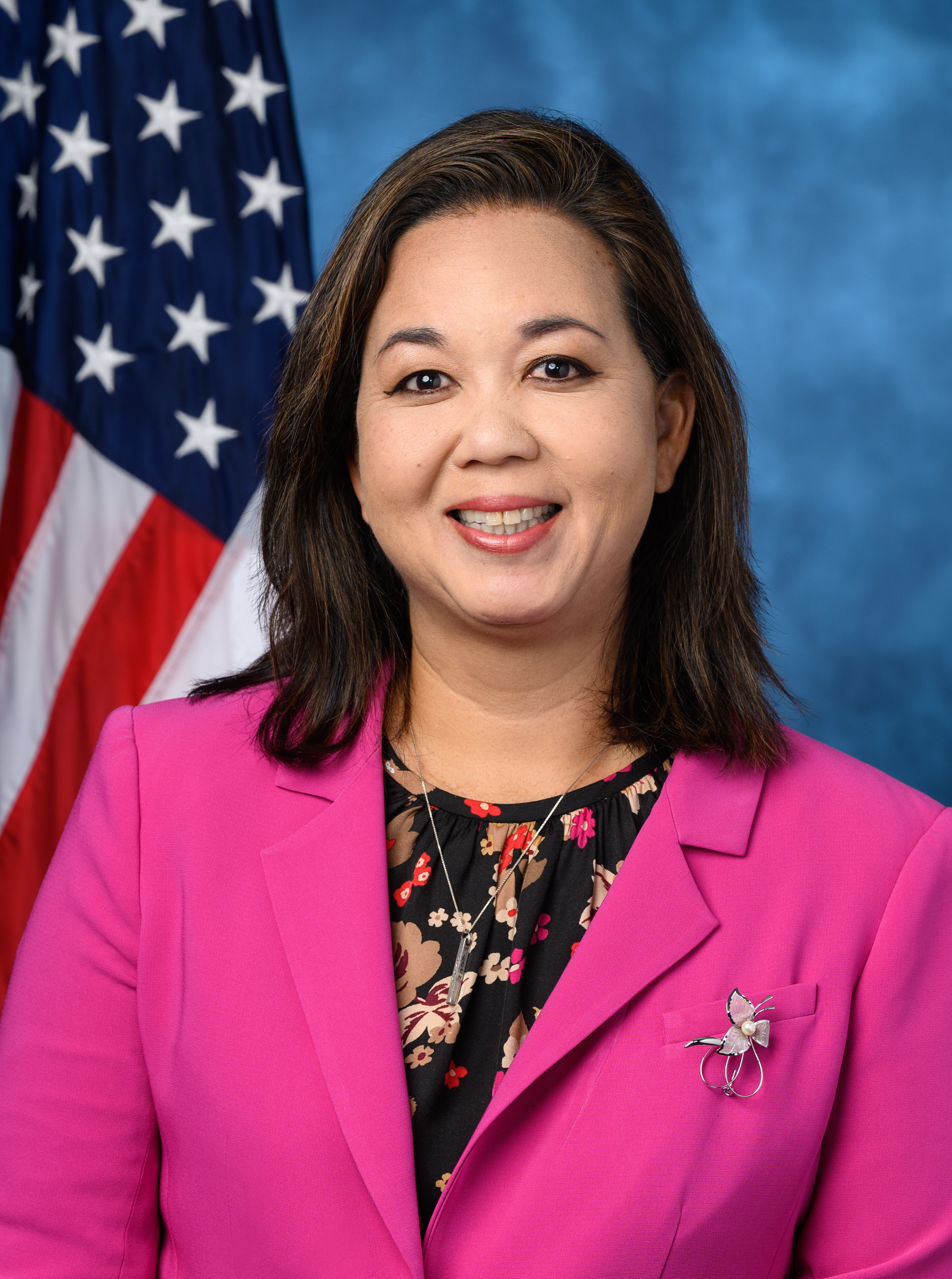
Jill Tokuda
U.S. Representative HI-02
(Democrat)

Hawaii is part of the United States District Court for the District of Hawaii in the federal judiciary. The district's cases are appealed to the San Francisco-based United States Court of Appeals for the Ninth Circuit.

== County government ==
Each of Hawaii's four counties is governed by a mayor as follows:

City and County of Honolulu - Rick Blangiardi
County of Hawaii - Mitch Roth
County of Maui - Richard Bissen
County of Kauai - Derek Kawakami

== Hawaiian nationalism ==
Hawaiian nationalism is focused on producing a national identity, distinct from that of the United States. Most Hawaiian nationalists have argued that the Hawaiian race and their descendants should govern the islands as a constitutional monarchy. Hawaiian nationalism is not limited to Native Hawaiians but has included other groups including whites and Asians; Walter M. Gibson was an early defender of Hawaiian sovereignty.

A green, red and yellow flag, the Kanaka Maoli flag was designed around the 1990s and has gained popularity, probably by Gene Simeona. According to Dr. David Keanu Sai of the University of Hawaiʻi, it had no historical significance before this time, when it was reported (and widely believed) to be an "original" flag of the Kingdom of Hawaii destroyed by the British. Dr. Sai stated that it was in fact a modern design, part of a "reawakening" of awareness of the Kingdom's history; he added that the present-day Hawaiian state flag was also the Kingdom's flag (in the 19th century), designed by King Kamehameha I.

Ka Hae Hawaiʻi flown upside down, symbolizing distress, used by Hawaiian separatists

Kanaka Maoli flag, popular in the Hawaiian sovereignty movement since the 1990s

Most citizens of Hawaii do not share the same sentiments of the sovereignty movement with public opinion largely in favor of remaining part of the United States. A 2014 poll by the Honolulu Star-Advertiser found that only 6% of respondents supported the creation of a Native Hawaiian nation while 63% being against it.

== See also ==
- Political party strength in Hawaii
