= Luke Evslin =

American politician (born 1984)

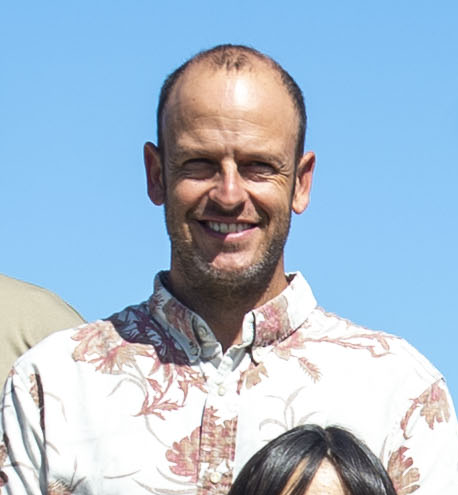
- Evslin in 2023

Member of the Hawaii House of Representatives from the 16th district
- Incumbent
- Assumed office February 21, 2023
- Appointed by: Josh Green
- Preceded by: James Tokioka

Personal details
- Born: 1984 (age 41–42) Wailua, Kauai, Hawaii, U.S.
- Party: Democratic
- Spouse: Sokchea (m. 2011)
- Children: 2
- Education: University of Hawaiʻi at Mānoa (BA); University of Southern California (MPA)
- Profession: businessperson, teacher

Luke Alexander Evslin (born 1984) is an American politician serving in the Hawaii House of Representatives for the 16th district (Wailua, Hanamā‘ulu, Kapaia, Līhu‘e, Puhi, portion of ‘Ōma‘o). He was appointed by Governor Josh Green in 2023 to replace James Tokioka and serve out the rest of his term.

== Early life and education ==
Evslin was born and raised in Wailua, Kaua'i in 1984 and graduated from Kaua'i High School in 2003. He earned a B.A. in history from the University of Hawaiʻi at Mānoa in 2007 and an M.P.A. from the University of Southern California in 2020.

Evslin also served four years on the Kaua'i County Council, co-founded a Kailua-based outrigger canoe manufacturing company, and taught high school civics, American government, and Hawaiian history at Island School.
