= Kauai County, Hawaii =

County in Hawaii, United States

County of Kauaʻi
- County
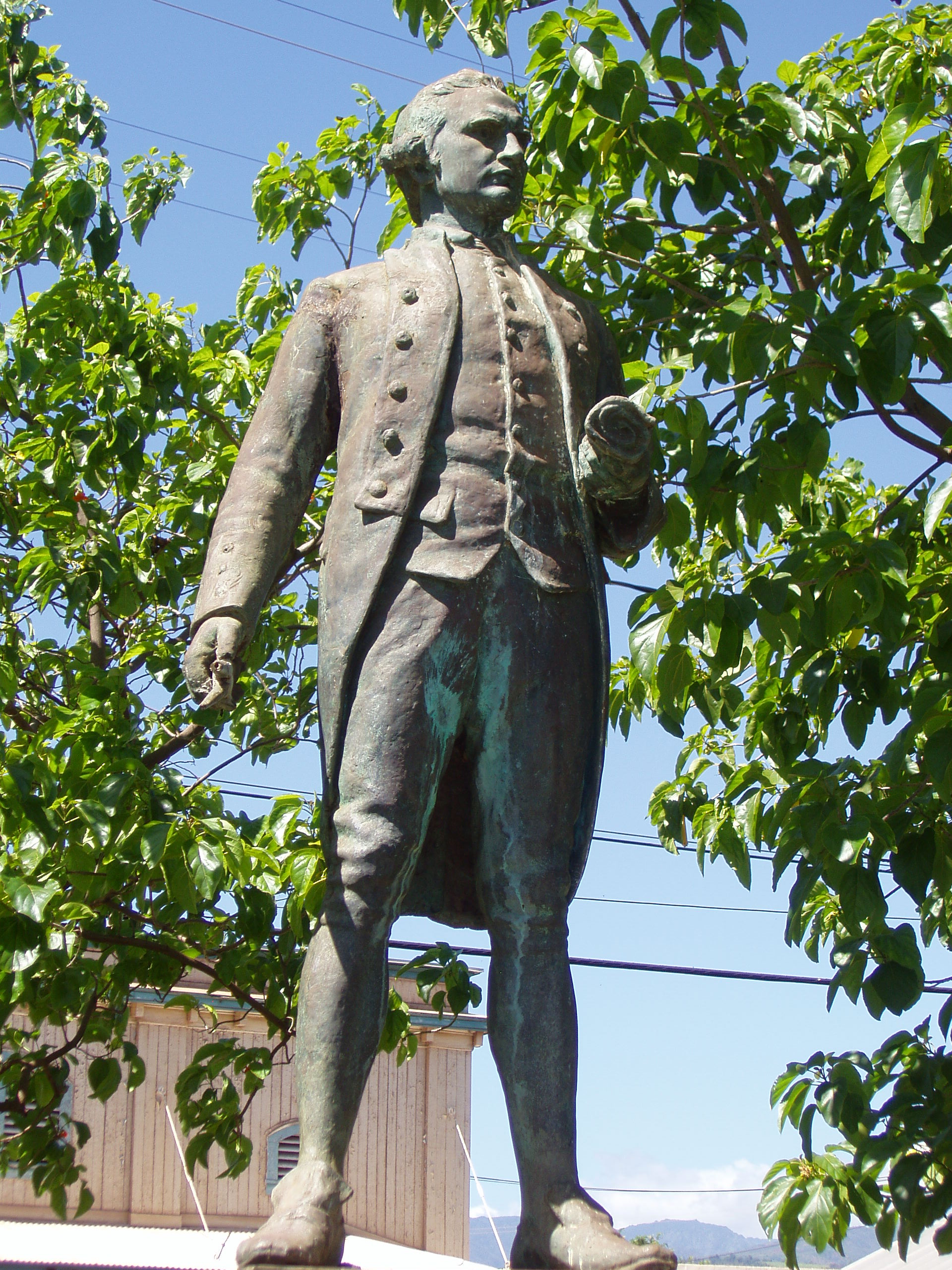
- Captain James Cook statue

- Seal

- Location within the U.S. state of Hawaii
- Coordinates: 22°04′00″N 159°39′00″W
- Country: United States
- State: Hawaii
- Founded: 1905
- Seat: Līhuʻe
- Largest community: Kapa‘a

Government
  - Mayor: Derek Kawakami

Area
  - Total: 1,266 sq mi (3,280 km^{2})
  - Land: 620 sq mi (1,600 km^{2})
  - Water: 646 sq mi (1,670 km^{2}) 51.0%

Population (2020)
  - Total: 73,298
  - Estimate (2025): 73,400 ▲
  - Density: 120/sq mi (46/km^{2})
- Time zone: UTC−10 (Hawaii–Aleutian)
- Congressional district: 2nd
- Website: www.kauai.gov

Kauai County (Hawaiian: Kalana o Kauaʻi), officially known as the County of Kauaʻi, is a county in the U.S. state of Hawaii. It encompasses the islands of Kauaʻi, Niʻihau, Lehua, and Kaʻula. According to the 2020 Census, the population was 73,298. The county seat is Līhuʻe.

The Kapaʻa Micropolitan Statistical Area includes all of Kauai County.

== Geography ==
According to the U.S. Census Bureau, the county has a total area of 1,266 square miles (3,280 km^{2}), of which 620 square miles (1,600 km^{2}) is land and 646 square miles (1,670 km^{2}) (51.0%) is water. The Pacific Ocean surrounds the county.

=== Adjacent entities ===
- Honolulu County, Hawaii – southeast
- Midway Atoll – northwest

=== National protected areas ===
- Hanalei National Wildlife Refuge
- Hulēʻia National Wildlife Refuge
- Kīlauea Point National Wildlife Refuge

== Communities ==
There are no incorporated communities in Kauai County, or in any other county of Hawaii. The county is the only form of local government in the State of Hawaii.

=== Census-designated places ===
- Anahola
- ʻEleʻele
- Hāʻena
- Hanalei
- Hanamāʻulu
- Hanapēpē
- Kalāheo
- Kalihiwai
- Kapaʻa
- Kaumakani
- Kekaha
- Kīlauea
- Kōloa
- Lāwaʻi
- Līhuʻe
- ʻŌmaʻo
- Pākalā Village
- Poʻipū
- Princeville
- Puhi
- Wailua
- Wailua Homesteads
- Waimea
- Wainiha

=== Other unincorporated places ===
- Puʻuwai
- Keālia

== Demographics ==
Historical population
Census	Pop.	Note	%±
1900	20,734		—
1910	23,952		15.5%
1920	29,438		22.9%
1930	35,942		22.1%
1940	35,818		−0.3%
1950	29,905		−16.5%
1960	28,176		−5.8%
1970	29,761		5.6%
1980	39,082		31.3%
1990	51,177		30.9%
2000	58,463		14.2%
2010	67,091		14.8%
2020	73,298		9.3%
2025 (est.)	73,400	▲	0.1%
U.S. Decennial Census; 1790-1960 1900-1990; 1990-2000 2010-2020

=== 2020 census ===
As of the 2020 census, the county had a population of 73,298. Of the residents, 21.5% were under the age of 18 and 21.2% were 65 years of age or older; the median age was 43.0 years. For every 100 females there were 97.5 males, and for every 100 females age 18 and over there were 96.2 males. 57.8% of residents lived in urban areas and 42.2% lived in rural areas.

The racial makeup of the county was 31.7% White, 0.5% Black or African American, 0.4% American Indian and Alaska Native, 28.8% Asian, 9.9% Native Hawaiian and Pacific Islander, 1.5% from some other race, and 27.3% from two or more races. Hispanic or Latino residents of any race comprised 10.1% of the population.

There were 24,712 households in the county, of which 33.8% had children under the age of 18 living with them and 24.5% had a female householder with no spouse or partner present. About 21.6% of all households were made up of individuals and 11.1% had someone living alone who was 65 years of age or older.

There were 30,157 housing units, of which 18.1% were vacant. Among occupied housing units, 62.8% were owner-occupied and 37.2% were renter-occupied. The homeowner vacancy rate was 1.1% and the rental vacancy rate was 13.4%.

Kauai County, Hawaii – Racial and ethnic composition Note: the US Census treats Hispanic/Latino as an ethnic category. This table excludes Latinos from the racial categories and assigns them to a separate category. Hispanics/Latinos may be of any race.
Race / Ethnicity (NH = Non-Hispanic)	Pop 1980	Pop 1990	Pop 2000	Pop 2010	Pop 2020	% 1980	% 1990	% 2000	% 2010	% 2020
White alone (NH)	10,109	16,235	16,284	20,611	22,194	25.87%	31.72%	27.85%	30.72%	30.28%
Black or African American alone (NH)	64	193	163	258	352	0.16%	0.38%	0.28%	0.38%	0.48%
Native American or Alaska Native alone (NH)	78	149	138	158	156	0.20%	0.29%	0.24%	0.24%	0.21%
Asian alone (NH)	25,561	28,914	20,412	20,296	20,504	65.40%	56.50%	34.91%	30.25%	27.97%
Native Hawaiian or Pacific Islander alone (NH)	x	x	5,077	5,716	6,825	x	x	8.68%	8.52%	9.31%
Other race alone (NH)	0	106	82	74	283	0.00%	0.21%	0.14%	0.11%	0.39%
Mixed race or Multiracial (NH)	x	x	11,504	13,663	15,590	x	x	19.68%	20.36%	21.27%
Hispanic or Latino (any race)	3,270	5,580	4,803	6,315	7,394	8.37%	10.90%	8.22%	9.41%	10.09%
Total	39,082	51,177	58,463	67,091	73,298	100.00%	100.00%	100.00%	100.00%	100.00%

=== 2000 census ===
At the 2000 census there were 58,463 people, 20,183 households, and 14,572 families in the county. The population density was 94 people per square mile (36 people/km^{2}). There were 25,331 housing units at an average density of 41 per square mile (16/km^{2}). The racial makeup of the county was 36.0% Asian, 29.5% White, 23.8% from two or more races, 9.1% Pacific Islander, 0.3% Black or African American, 0.4% Native American and 0.9% from other races. 8.2%. were Hispanic or Latino of any race.

Of the 20,183 households 34.0% had children under the age of 18 living with them, 53.9% were married couples living together, 12.8% had a female householder with no husband present, and 27.8% were non-families. 21.4% of households were one person and 7.7% were one person aged 65 or older. The average household size was 2.87 and the average family size was 3.34.

The age distribution was 26.4% under the age of 18, 7.1% from 18 to 24, 27.2% from 25 to 44, 25.5% from 45 to 64, and 13.8% 65 or older. The median age was 38 years. For every 100 females there were 100.10 males. For every 100 females age 18 and over, there were 97.50 males.

== Economy ==
=== Top employers ===
According to the county's 2022 annual comprehensive financial report, the top non-government employers in the county are the following:

#	Employer	# of Employees
1	Wilcox Health (Wilcox Medical Center)	846
2	Grand Hyatt Kauai Resort and Spa	810
3	Ohana Pacific Management Co.	371
4	Kauaʻi Veterans Memorial Hospital	275
5	Kauaʻi Beach Resort & Spa	160
6	Samuel Mahelona Memorial Hospital	148
7	Kauaʻi Island Utility Cooperative	140
8	Kauai Nursery & Landscaping Inc.	97
9	Gather FCU	88
10	The Parrish Collection	85

== Education ==
=== Higher education ===
Kauaʻi Community College is the county's only institution of higher education. One of the ten branches of the University of Hawaiʻi system, it offers a range of 2-year degrees and is accredited by the Western Association of Schools and Colleges.

=== Primary and Secondary Education ===
Public schools in the county are operated by the Hawaiʻi State Department of Education, and the county is represented by Maggie Cox on the state's Board of Education. There are 10 elementary schools, 3 middle schools, 3 high schools, and 5 K-12 schools in the county.

==== High schools ====
- Kapaʻa High School
- Kauai High School
- Waimea High School

==== Middle schools ====
- Chiefess Kamakahelei Middle School
- Kapaʻa Middle School
- Waimea Canyon Middle School

==== Elementary schools ====
- Alakaʻi O Kauaʻi Public Charter School
- ʻEleʻele Elementary School
- Hanalei Elementary School
- Kalāheo Elementary School
- Kapaʻa Elementary School
- Kaumualiʻi Elementary School
- Kekaha Elementary School
- Kīlauea Elementary School
- Kōloa Elementary School
- Wilcox Elementary School

==== K-12 Schools ====
- Kanuikapono Public Charter School
- Kawaikini New Century Public Charter School
- Ke Kula Niʻihau O Kekaha Learning Center
- Kula Aupuni Niʻihau A Kahelelani Aloha
- Niʻihau High & Elementary

=== Private schools ===
There are four private schools in the county: Island School, Kahili Adventist School, St. Theresa's Elementary School, and ʻŌlelo Christian Academy. St. Catherine's School used to operate, but closed its doors on June 7, 2024.

== Infrastructure ==
=== Transportation ===
Lihue Airport serves the island of Kauaʻi. Bus service is provided by The Kauaʻi Bus.

Major Highways

- Route 50
- Route 51
- Route 56
- Route 58
- Route 520
- Route 540
- Route 550
- Route 570
- Route 580
- Route 581
- Route 583

== Government and politics ==
United States Senate election results for Kauai County, Hawaii1
Year	Republican		Democratic		Third party(ies)	
Year	No.	%	No.	%	No.	%
2024	8,537	29.96%	18,934	66.45%	1,024	3.59%
2018	6,120	24.85%	18,510	75.15%	0	0.00%
2012	7,134	28.41%	17,973	71.59%	0	0.00%

United States Senate election results for Kauai County, Hawaii3
Year	Republican		Democratic		Third party(ies)	
Year	No.	%	No.	%	No.	%
2022	5,658	24.28%	16,891	72.50%	750	3.22%
2016	4,745	19.00%	19,015	76.13%	1,216	4.87%
2014	5,250	23.89%	16,189	73.67%	537	2.44%
2010	3,732	17.09%	17,192	78.72%	915	4.19%

Kauai County operates under a mayor-council form of municipal government. The Mayor of Kauai, elected by the voters on a nonpartisan basis, holds executive authority for a four-year term. Meanwhile, legislative authority is vested in the seven-member County Council. Members of the County Council are elected on a nonpartisan, at-large basis to two-year terms.

=== United States Congress ===
Kauai County, like the rest of Hawaii, is represented entirely by Democrats in both the United States Senate and the United States House of Representatives.

Senators	Name	Party	First Elected	Level
Senate Class 1	Mazie Hirono	Democratic	2013	Junior Senator
Senate Class 3	Brian Schatz	Democratic	2012	Senior Senator
Representatives	Name	Party	First Elected	Area(s) of Kauai County Represented
District 2	Jill Tokuda	Democratic	2023	entire county

=== Hawaii Legislature ===
==== Hawaii Senate ====
District	Name	Party	First Elected	Area(s) of Kauai County Represented
8	Ron Kouchi	Democratic	2010	entire county

==== Hawaii House of Representatives ====
District	Name	Party	First Elected	Area(s) of Kauai County Represented
15	Nadine Nakamura	Democratic	2016	Hā‘ena, Wainiha, Hanalei, Princeville, Kīlauea, Anahola, Keālia, Kāpa‘a, portion of Wailuā, Kawaihau
16	Luke Evslin	Democratic	2023 (Note: Appointed to seat on February 15, 2023, by Governor Josh Green after James Tokioka was appointed to join the governor's cabinet.)	Wailuā, Hanamāʻulu, Kapaia, Līhuʻe, Puhi, portion of ʻŌmaʻo
17	Dee Morikawa	Democratic	2011	Niʻihau, portion of ʻŌmaʻo, Kōloa, Po‘ipū, Lāwa‘i, Kalāheo, ‘Ele‘ele, Hanapēpē, Kaawanui Village, Pākalā Village, Waimea, Kekaha

=== Elections ===
Gubernatorial election results for Kauai County, Hawaii
Year	Republican		Democratic		Third party(ies)	
Year	No.	%	No.	%	No.	%
2022	9,632	40.37%	14,227	59.63%	0	0.00%
2018	8,135	32.76%	15,868	63.90%	830	3.34%
2014	7,495	31.99%	12,451	53.14%	3,483	14.87%
2010	8,953	39.50%	13,559	59.82%	156	0.69%

United States presidential election results for Kauai County, Hawaii
Year	Republican		Democratic		Third party(ies)	
Year	No.	%	No.	%	No.	%
1960	5,655	54.95%	4,636	45.05%	0	0.00%
1964	1,971	18.45%	8,713	81.55%	0	0.00%
1968	4,140	36.49%	7,051	62.15%	155	1.37%
1972	7,571	58.36%	5,401	41.64%	0	0.00%
1976	6,278	43.23%	8,105	55.81%	139	0.96%
1980	5,883	35.39%	9,081	54.64%	1,657	9.97%
1984	9,249	50.45%	8,862	48.34%	221	1.21%
1988	8,298	40.95%	11,770	58.08%	198	0.98%
1992	6,274	32.80%	10,715	56.02%	2,138	11.18%
1996	5,325	25.33%	13,357	63.54%	2,338	11.12%
2000	6,583	30.23%	13,470	61.87%	1,720	7.90%
2004	9,740	39.15%	14,916	59.96%	220	0.88%
2008	6,245	22.94%	20,416	74.99%	563	2.07%
2012	6,121	24.13%	18,641	73.47%	610	2.40%
2016	7,574	28.76%	16,456	62.49%	2,305	8.75%
2020	11,582	34.58%	21,225	63.36%	690	2.06%
2024	11,803	39.26%	17,675	58.79%	586	1.95%

Kauai County, like Hawaii in general, has traditionally been a stronghold of the Democratic Party. The county has not voted for a Republican presidential candidate since 1984, when it narrowly voted in favor of Ronald Reagan. In 2024, while it still voted majority Democratic, Kauai County cast the highest percentage for the Republican candidate of any county in the state, a distinction that has generally been held by Honolulu County; this was the first time Kauai County had done so since 1960. The island of Kauai leans Democratic overall. The island of Ni'ihau, which has a very small population, tends to vote almost entirely Republican, by far the strongest such leaning of all major Hawaiian islands.

== Sister cities ==
Kauai County's sister cities are:

- Bangued, Philippines
- Cook, Australia
- Davao City, Philippines
- Ishigaki, Japan
- Iwaki, Japan
- Laoag, Philippines
- Moriyama, Japan
- Papenoo, French Polynesia
- Penghu, Taiwan
- Ponta Delgada, Portugal
- Qinhuangdao, China
- Santa, Philippines
- Suō-Ōshima, Japan
- Urdaneta, Philippines
- Whitby, England, United Kingdom
