= 1992 United States presidential election in Hawaii =

- November 3, 1992

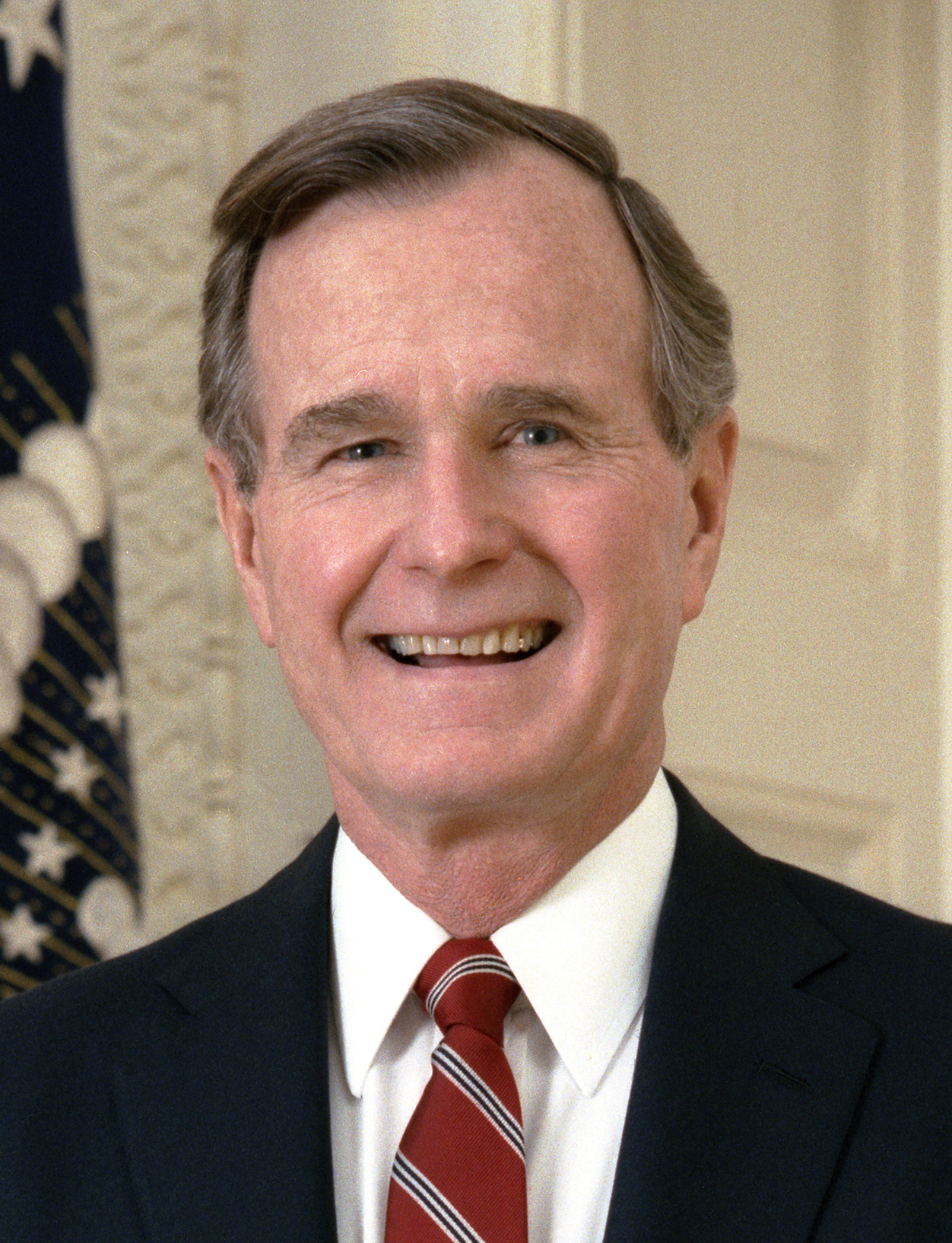

Nominee	Bill Clinton	George H. W. Bush	Ross Perot
Party	Democratic	Republican	Independent
Home state	Arkansas	Texas	Texas
Running mate	Al Gore	Dan Quayle	James Stockdale
Electoral vote	4	0	0
Popular vote	179,310	136,822	53,003
Percentage	48.09%	36.70%	14.22%
County results
Clinton
40–50%
50–60%
60–70%
President before election
George H. W. Bush
Republican
Elected President
Bill Clinton
Democratic

The 1992 United States presidential election in Hawaii took place on November 3, 1992, as part of the 1992 United States presidential election. Voters chose four representatives, or electors to the Electoral College, who voted for president and vice president.

Hawaii was won by Governor Bill Clinton (D-Arkansas) with 48.09% of the popular vote over incumbent President George H. W. Bush (R-Texas) with 36.70%. Businessman Ross Perot (I-Texas) finished in third, with 14.22% of the popular vote, which was nonetheless Perot's poorest showing outside the District of Columbia and antebellum slave states. Clinton ultimately won the national vote, defeating incumbent President Bush. Clinton comfortably won Hawaii by a margin of 11.39%. It has only voted Republican twice since its statehood, in the 49-state Republican landslides of 1972 and 1984. From 1988 forward it has consistently voted Democratic by comfortable margins.

== Results ==
1992 United States presidential election in Hawaii
Party	Candidate	Votes	Percentage	Electoral votes
Democratic	Bill Clinton	179,310	48.09%	4
Republican	George H. W. Bush (incumbent)	136,822	36.70%	0
Independent	Ross Perot	53,003	14.22%	0
America First	James "Bo" Gritz	1,452	0.39%	0
Libertarian	Andre Marrou	1,119	0.30%	0
New Alliance Party	Lenora Fulani	720	0.19%	0
Natural Law	Dr. John Hagelin	416	0.11%	0
Totals		372,842	100.0%	4

=== By county ===
County	Bill Clinton Democratic		George H.W. Bush Republican		Various candidates Other parties		Margin		Total votes cast
County	#	%	#	%	#	%	#	%	Total votes cast
Hawaii	25,725	50.52%	15,460	30.36%	9,731	19.12%	10,265	20.16%	50,916
Honolulu	123,908	46.61%	103,937	39.10%	37,996	14.29%	19,971	7.51%	265,841
Kalawao	48	64.00%	24	32.00%	3	4.00%	24	32.00%	75
Kauaʻi	10,715	56.02%	6,274	32.80%	2,138	11.18%	4,441	23.22%	19,127
Maui	18,962	51.31%	11,151	30.17%	6,845	18.52%	7,811	21.14%	36,958
Totals	179,310	48.09%	136,822	36.70%	56,710	15.21%	42,488	11.39%	372,842
