= Lāwaʻi, Hawaii =

Lāwaʻi
- Census-designated place
- Location in Kauaʻi County and the state of Hawaii
- Coordinates: 21°55′31″N 159°30′27″W
- Country: United States
- State: Hawaii
- County: Kauaʻi

Area
  - Total: 4.15 sq mi (10.75 km^{2})
  - Land: 4.05 sq mi (10.50 km^{2})
  - Water: 0.097 sq mi (0.25 km^{2})
- Elevation: 554 ft (169 m)

Population (2024)
  - Total: 2,718
  - Density: 670.4/sq mi (258.9/km^{2})
- Time zone: UTC-10 (Hawaii-Aleutian)
- ZIP code: 96765
- Area code: 808
- FIPS code: 15-44450
- GNIS feature ID: 0361798

Lāwaʻi is a census-designated place (CDP) in Kauaʻi County in the U.S. state of Hawaiʻi. The population was 2,718 at the 2024 census, up from 1,984 at the 2000 census.

== Geography ==
Lāwaʻi is located on the southern side of the island of Kauaʻi at 21°55′31″N 159°30′27″W (21.925343, -159.507385). It is bordered to the west by Kalaheo and to the east by Omao. Hawaii Route 50 passes through Lawai, leading northeast 11 miles (18 km) to Lihue and west 6 miles (10 km) to Hanapepe.

According to the United States Census Bureau, the Lawai CDP has a total land area of 4.058 square miles (10.51 km^{2}), and 0.097 square miles (0.25 km^{2}) of water.

== Demographics ==
Historical population
Census	Pop.	Note	%±
2020	2,497		—
United States Census Bureau

As of the census of 2000, there were 1,993 people, 713 households, and 550 families residing in the CDP. The population density was 492.09 inhabitants per square mile (190.00/km^{2}). The racial makeup of the CDP was 39.0% White, 27.7% Asian, 18.0% native Pacific Islander or mixed with native,12.7% Hispanic or Latino, 2.6% from other races or racial combinations.

There were 713 households, out of which 37.3% had children under the age of 18 living with them, 62.1% were married couples living together, 8.8% had a female householder with no husband present, and 22.9% were non-families. 18.2% of all households were made up of individuals, and 5.8% had someone living alone who was 65 years of age or older. The average household size was 2.80 and the average family size was 3.15.

In the CDP the population was spread out, with 25.5% under the age of 18, 72.0% who were 21 years of age or older, 16.0% who were 62 years of age or older, and 13.2% who were 65 years of age or older. The median age was 38.9 years. For every 100 females, there were 105.8 males. The population was 52.3% male and 47.7% female.

The median income for a household in the CDP in 1999 was $55,662, and the median income for a family was $60,750. Males had a median income of $34,479 versus $30,761 for females. The per capita income for the CDP was $22,884. About 2.7% of families and 4.9% of individuals were below the poverty line, including 4.6% of those under age 18 and 0.8% of those age 65 or over. 12.7% of families with a female householder and no husband present also had poverty status in 1999.

== Points of interest ==
- Allerton Garden
- McBryde Garden

== Notable people ==
- Kaliko Kauahi, actress
