= ʻŌmaʻo, Hawaii =

ʻŌmaʻo
- Census-designated place
- Location in Kauaʻi County and the state of Hawaii
- Coordinates: 21°55′11″N 159°28′54″W
- Country: United States
- State: Hawaii
- County: Kauaʻi

Area
  - Total: 1.28 sq mi (3.32 km^{2})
  - Land: 1.27 sq mi (3.28 km^{2})
  - Water: 0.015 sq mi (0.04 km^{2})
- Elevation: 587 ft (179 m)

Population (2020)
  - Total: 1,346
  - Density: 1,061.9/sq mi (409.99/km^{2})
- Time zone: UTC-10 (Hawaii-Aleutian)
- Area code: 808
- FIPS code: 15-57800
- GNIS feature ID: 0362806

ʻŌmaʻo (literally, "green" in Hawaiian) is a census-designated place (CDP) in Kauaʻi County, Hawaiʻi, United States. The population was 1,346 at the 2020 census.

== Geography ==
ʻŌmaʻo is located on the south side of the island of Kauaʻi at 21°55′11″N 159°28′54″W (21.919852, -159.481689). It is bordered to the west by Lawai and to the southeast by Koloa. Hawaii Route 50 passes through the north side of the community, leading northeast 9 miles (14 km) to Lihue and west 8 miles (13 km) to Hanapepe.

According to the United States Census Bureau, the Omao CDP has a total area of 1.3 square miles (3.3 km^{2}), of which 0.02 square miles (0.05 km^{2}), or 1.43%, are water.

== Demographics ==
Historical population
Census	Pop.	Note	%±
1990	1,142		—
2000	1,221		6.9%
2010	1,301		6.6%
2020	1,346		3.5%

As of the census of 2000, there were 1,221 people, 392 households, and 297 families residing in the CDP. The population density was 1,018.9 inhabitants per square mile (393.4/km^{2}). There were 422 housing units at an average density of 352.1 per square mile (135.9/km^{2}). The racial makeup of the CDP was 39.6% White, 0.2% African American, 0.9% Native American, 28.5% Asian, 5.7% Pacific Islander, 1.3% from other races, and 23.8% from two or more races. Hispanic or Latino of any race were 12.9% of the population.

There were 392 households, out of which 38.3% had children under the age of 18 living with them, 59.7% were married couples living together, 10.7% had a female householder with no husband present, and 24.2% were non-families. 17.3% of all households were made up of individuals, and 7.1% had someone living alone who was 65 years of age or older. The average household size was 2.97 and the average family size was 3.36.

In the CDP the population was spread out, with 26.2% under the age of 18, 6.2% from 18 to 24, 29.1% from 25 to 44, 23.6% from 45 to 64, and 14.9% who were 65 years of age or older. The median age was 39 years. For every 100 females, there were 104.9 males. For every 100 females age 18 and over, there were 99.3 males.

The median income for a household in the CDP was $53,750, and the median income for a family was $61,042. Males had a median income of $30,300 versus $27,647 for females. The per capita income for the CDP was $20,175. About 6.0% of families and 10.0% of the population were below the poverty line, including 9.0% of those under age 18 and 20.0% of those age 65 or over.
