= The Kauaʻi Bus =

Public transit service on the island of Kauaʻi, Hawaii

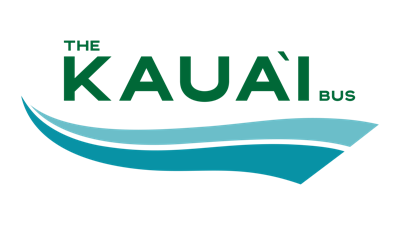

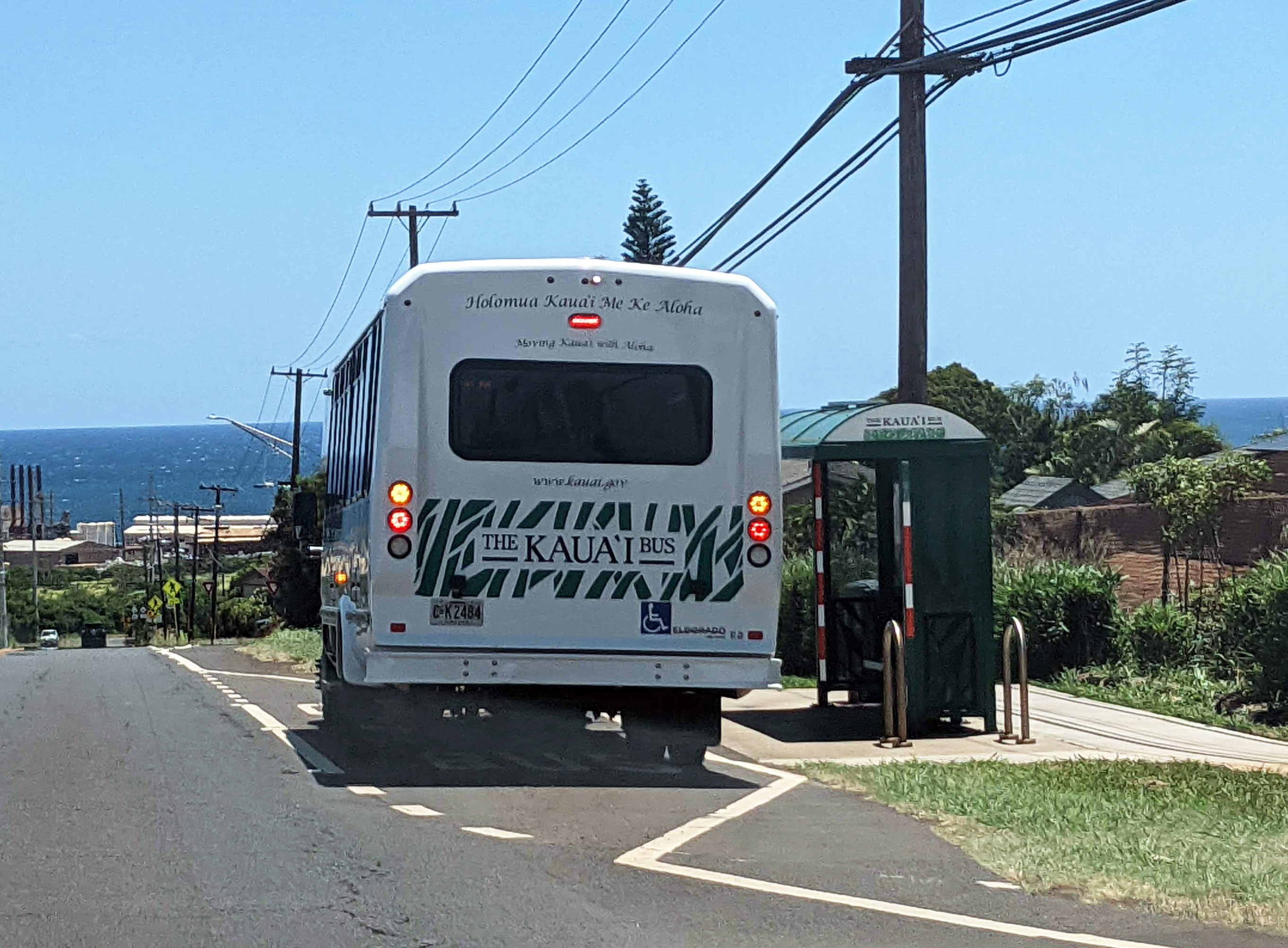
- The Kauaʻi Bus at a bus stop.
- Parent: Kauaʻi County
- Founded: October 1994
- Headquarters: Līhuʻe, Hawaiʻi
- Service area: Kauaʻi County, Hawaiʻi
- Service type: bus service, paratransit
- Routes: 9 regular, plus 2 limited service express
- Fuel type: Diesel
- Website: Official website

The Kauaʻi Bus is the public transportation service of Kauaʻi County, Hawaiʻi. It runs nine regular local bus routes; the Mainline service, runs along the perimeter of the island from Kekaha to Hanalei. The bus fare for the mainline is $2 but due to the hurricane, all fares have been waived.

== History ==
The forerunner of the Kauaʻi Bus was a fleet of ten buses managed by the County of Kauaʻi's Office of Elderly Affairs to serve the senior population. In 1990, the first four fixed routes were started between Kapaʻa and Līhuʻe, and was expanded island-wide in 1992 with Hurricane Iniki recovery funding from FEMA.

The Kauaʻi Bus has a central administration, operations, and maintenance facility at 3220 Hoolako Street in Līhuʻe.

== Routes ==
The Kauaʻi Bus operates fixed routes; five of those run six days a week. (They do not run on Sundays, including paratransit, until further notice due to staffing shortages.) Three of the routes make up the Mainline service, which runs along the perimeter of the island from Kekaha to Hanalei. Two of the Mainline routes (Kekaha–Līhuʻe, primarily aligned with Route 50 and Hanalei–Līhuʻe, primarily aligned with Route 56) connect in Līhuʻe, and the third (Wailua) duplicates Hanalei–Līhuʻe service between Wailua and Līhuʻe, with additional service along Kuamoo Road within Wailua. The Wailua Mainline is not operated on weekends. The other three routes are Shuttle services, which provide local service within their respective communities (Kalāheo/Kōloa/Poipū, Kapaʻa/Kapahi, and Līhuʻe).

The midday Līhuʻe Lunch Shuttle (Routes 01–12) was discontinued as of April 11, 2016.

The 2018 Short Range Transit Plan proposed splitting the Līhuʻe Shuttle (Route 70) into two separate routes connecting in downtown Līhuʻe. The revised Līhuʻe Shuttle would operate between Lihue Airport and Hanamāʻulu, and the Puhi Shuttle would operate between Kauaʻi Community College and downtown Līhuʻe. Routes 100E and 150 were discontinued as of October 21, 2018, and the 200E express was discontinued as of January 13, 2019. The October 2018 changes also extended Route 100/200 service (Kekaha – Līhuʻe Mainline) to Līhuʻe Airport and Courthouse, removing those stops from Route 70 (Līhuʻe Shuttle).

No.	Name	Fare	Service Hours	Headway
Mainline Routes
100/200 (Note: 100 is inbound to Līhuʻe; 200 is outbound to Kekaha)	Kekaha-Līhuʻe	Mainline	5:15 AM – 9:15 PM / 5:25 AM – 7:25 PM	60 min
400/500 (Note: 400 is inbound to Līhuʻe; 500 is outbound to Hanalei)	Hanalei-Līhuʻe	Mainline	5:15 AM – 9:15 PM / 5:25 AM – 7:25 PM	60 min
800/850 (Note: 800 is inbound to Līhuʻe; 850 is outbound to Wailua / Kapaʻa)	Wailua-Līhuʻe	Mainline	6:30, 7:30 AM / 12:30, 4:30, 6:30 PM	60–240 min (Note: Weekdays only)
Shuttle Routes
30	Kōloa	Shuttle	6:15 AM – 8:15 PM	60 min
60	Kapahi	Shuttle	6:23 AM – 8:23 PM	60 min
70	Līhuʻe	Shuttle	5:55 AM – 8:55 PM	60 min
Discontinued Routes
01-12	Līhuʻe Midday Shuttle (Note: Numbered sequentially; 01 is the 10:30 AM departure, 02 is 10:45 AM, etc.)	Shuttle	10:30 AM – 1:15 PM	15 min
100E/200E	Kekaha-Līhuʻe Express	Mainline	6:15 AM / 4:45 PM	1×
300/350	Kōloa-Līhuʻe (Note: 300 is inbound to Līhuʻe; 350 is outbound to Kōloa)	Mainline	6:20 AM – 5:20 PM / 7:45 AM – 5:30 PM	60–240 min
450/550	Kapaʻa-Līhuʻe (Note: 450 is inbound to Līhuʻe; 550 is outbound to Kapaʻa)	Mainline	6:03 AM – 6:03 PM / 7:21 AM – 3:21 PM	120 min
450E/550E	Kapaʻa-Līhuʻe Express	Mainline	7:00 AM	1×

== Fares ==
=== Regular fares ===
Fares
Group	Mainline	Shuttle
General Public	$2.00/trip	$0.50/trip
Discounted (Note: Discounted fares apply to the following groups: Seniors (65+ years); Youth (7–18 years); ADA with Kauaʻi Bus reduced fare identification card)	$1.00/trip	$0.25/trip
Children 6 and under	Free with paying passenger	

=== Passes ===
Duration	Regular	Discount
Daily Pass	$5.00	$2.50
Monthly Pass	$50.00	$25.00
Annual Pass	$550.00	$275.00

== Fleet ==
The Kauaʻi Bus fleet
Type	Quantity	Capacity		Service		
Type	Quantity	Passengers	Wheelchairs	Mainline	Shuttle	Paratransit
Bus (30+ passengers)	19	31–33	2	Yes	Yes	No
Bus (<30 passengers)	21	16–23	2–5	Yes (Note: Off-peak hours only)	Yes	Yes
Van	15	14–19	4–5	No	No	Yes

== See also ==
- TheBus (Honolulu)
- Maui Bus
