= Līhuʻe Airport =

Lihue Airport Kahua Mokulele o Līhuʻe
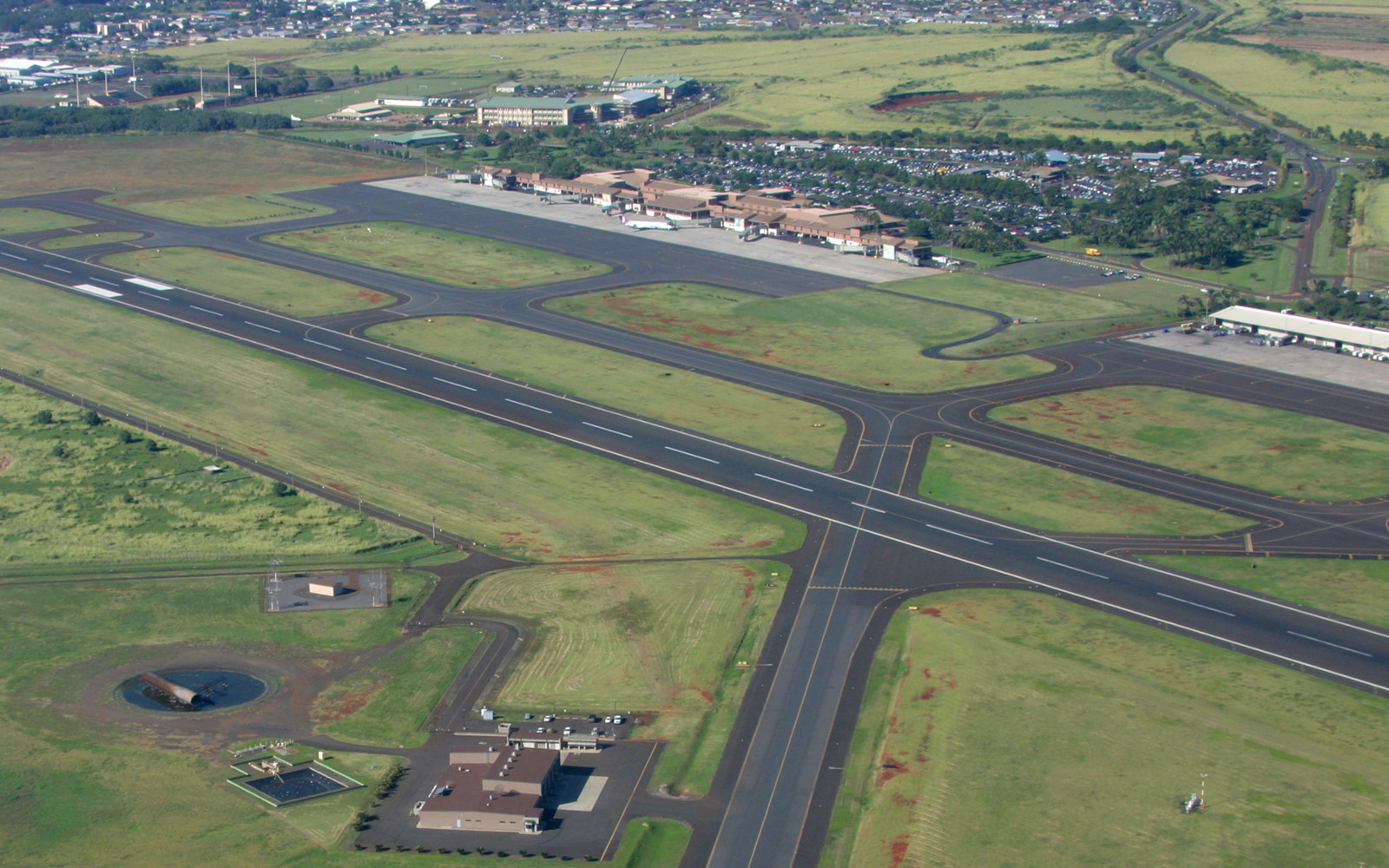
- Runway 03/21 and the passenger terminal in background; fire station in foreground
- IATA: LIH; ICAO: PHLI; FAA LID: LIH; WMO: 91165

Summary
- Airport type: Public
- Owner/Operator: Hawaii Department of Transportation
- Serves: Kauaʻi
- Location: Lihue, Hawaii
- Elevation AMSL: 153 ft (47 m)
- Coordinates: 21°58′34″N 159°20′20″W
- Website: hawaii.gov/lih

Maps
- FAA airport diagram
- Interactive map of Lihue Airport

Runways
Direction	Length		Surface
Direction	ft	m	Surface
03/21	6,500	1,981	Asphalt
17/35	6,500	1,981	Asphalt

Helipads
Number	Length		Surface
Number	ft	m	Surface
H1	64	20	Asphalt

Statistics (2024)
- Total passengers: 3,754,658 ▲2%
- Aircraft operations: 127,648
- Source: Federal Aviation Administration,

Lihue Airport (IATA: LIH, ICAO: PHLI, FAA LID: LIH) is a state-owned public-use airport located in the Līhuʻe CDP on the southeast coast of the island of Kauaʻi in Kauaʻi County, Hawaii, United States, two nautical miles east of the center of the CDP.

The airport does not serve as a hub for any airline carrier. Numerous inter-island flights are available daily on Hawaiian Airlines and Southwest Airlines. Major US and Canadian airlines operate flights on narrow-body aircraft to major cities in western mainland North America.

The airport is mostly un-walled and open-air, and the check-in is completely outside. The airport is the primary gateway to Kauai for visitors (especially tourists), and has several rental car facilities. Five motion pictures have filmed scenes at the Lihue Airport: Blue Hawaii, Honeymoon in Vegas, Six Days Seven Nights, Soul Surfer, and The Descendants. In a deleted scene of the film Lilo & Stitch; Stitch, Nani, Jumba, and Pleakley hijacked a Boeing 747 jet from this airport, scraping against buildings through downtown Honolulu. After the September 11 attacks, with only a few weeks left in production, the climax was completely reworked to have them use Jumba's spacecraft, and through the Kauaʻi mountains.

It is included in the Federal Aviation Administration (FAA) National Plan of Integrated Airport Systems for 2017–2021, in which it is categorized as a small-hub primary commercial service facility.

== Facilities and aircraft ==
Lihue Airport covers an area of 915 acres (370 hectares) at an elevation of 153 feet (47 m) above mean sea level. It has two asphalt paved runways designated 3/21 and 17/35, each measuring 6,500 by 150 feet (1,981 by 46 m). The airport also has one helipad measuring 64 by 64 feet (20 by 20 m).

On a typical day, certain gates are used for certain airlines to arrive in and depart out of the Lihue Airport. Gates 9-10 are mostly used by United Airlines, flying Boeing 737-800 and Boeing 737-900ER aircraft along with occasionally using the Boeing 757-200. Alaska Airlines occasionally uses Gate 9 as well. Gates 7-8 are mostly used by Delta Air Lines using the Airbus A321neo, Alaska Airlines using Boeing 737 aircraft, Southwest Airlines and WestJet. Hawaiian Airlines uses both Boeing 717 and Airbus A321 aircraft for gates 3-4, and 5-6 for their inter-island and US mainland flights, according to the airline staff. American Airlines mostly uses Gate 3 and occasionally Gate 4, using the Airbus A321 to fly in and out of Lihue. All gate areas are air-conditioned.

Hawaiian Airlines operates one Premier Lounge at the airport, open to first class travelers.

In July 2024, major construction related to the relocation of Runway 03/21 to comply with federal safety standards began. This includes displacing Runway 03/21 455 feet to the west and extending the end of the runway by 855 feet. Improvements to taxiways, Runway 17/35, and modernizing LED runway and taxiway signage are also part of the project. It is expected to be completed in December 2026.

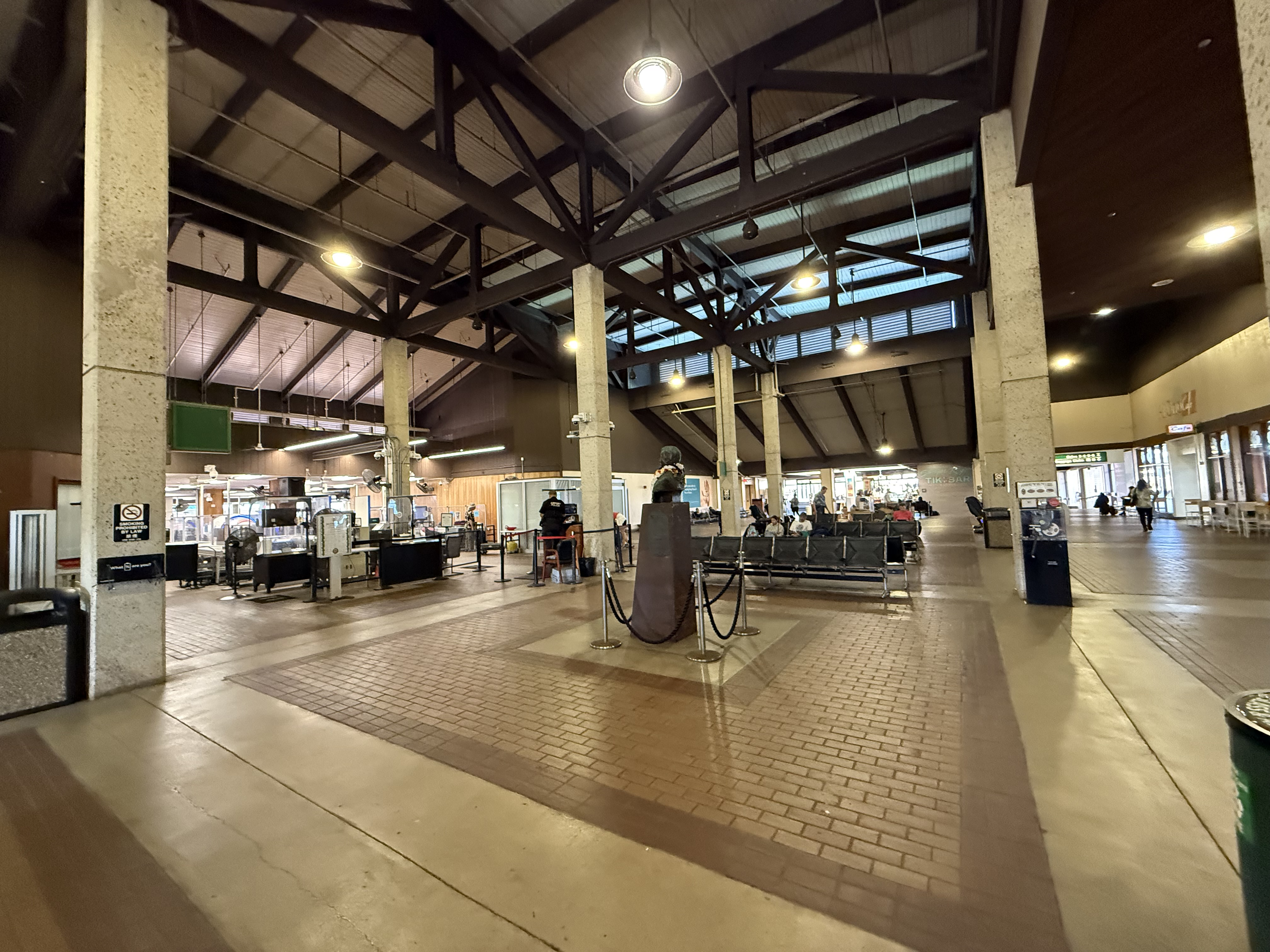
Lihue Airport

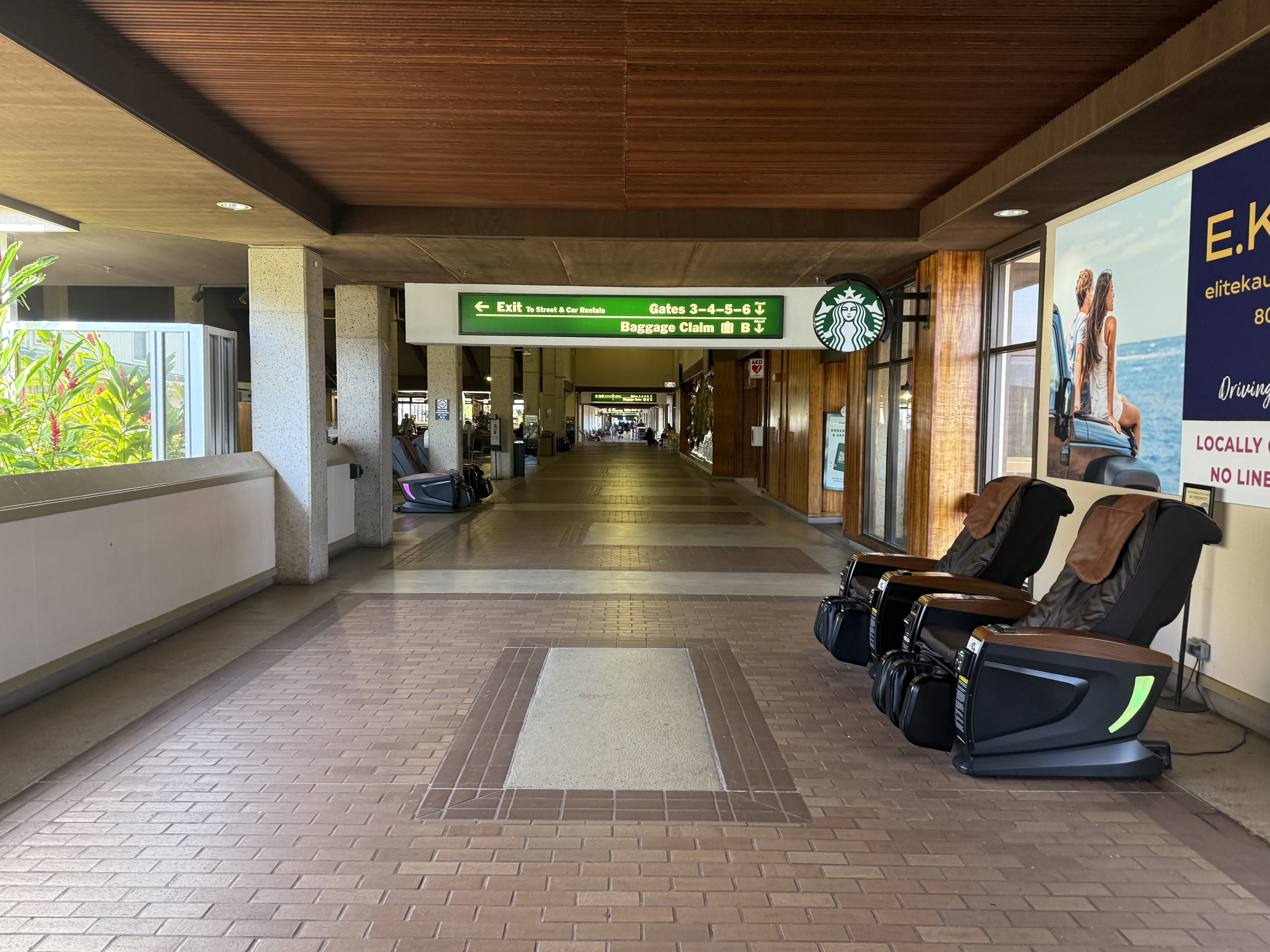
Lihue Airport Concourse

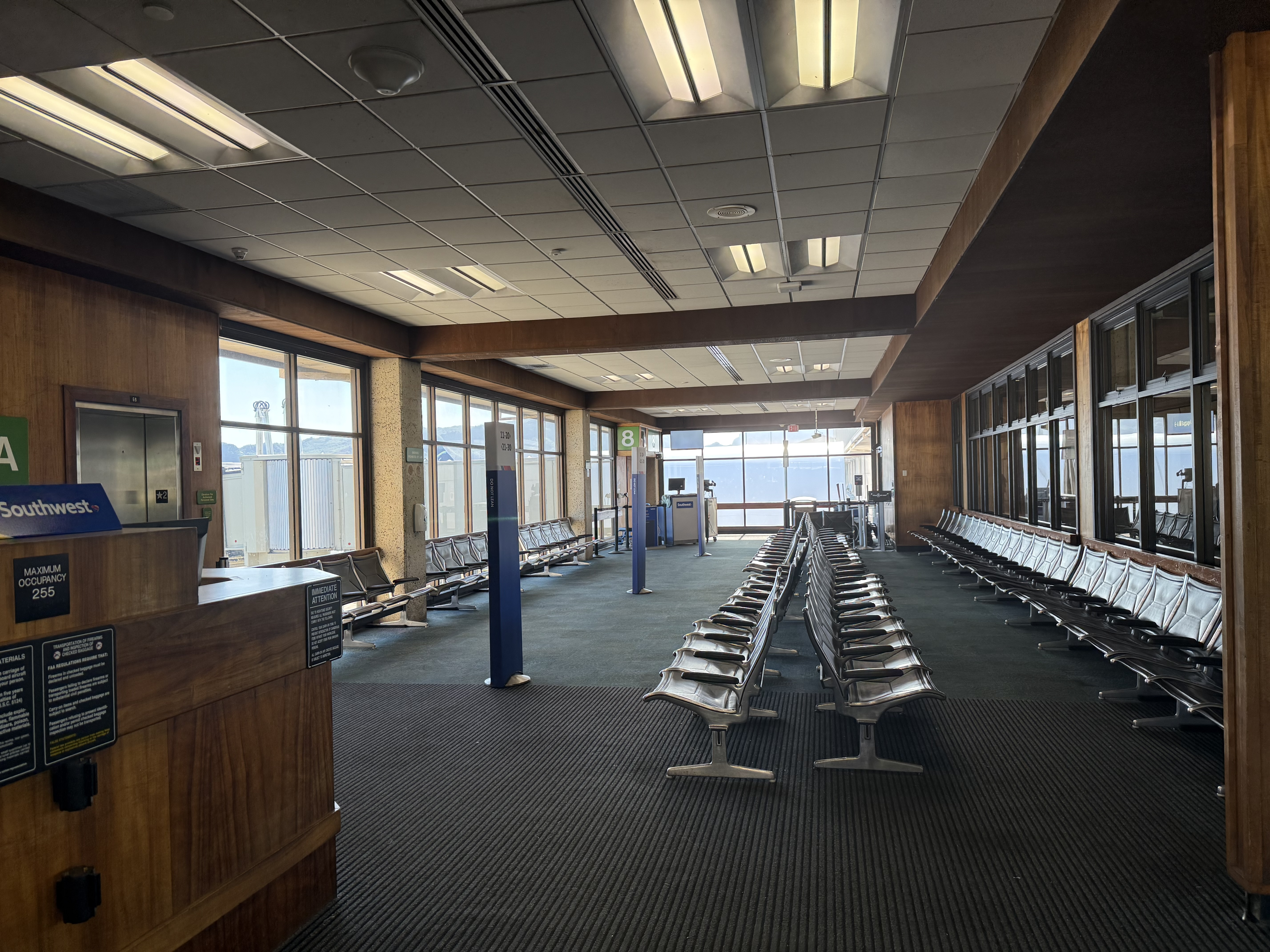
Lihue Airport Holdroom

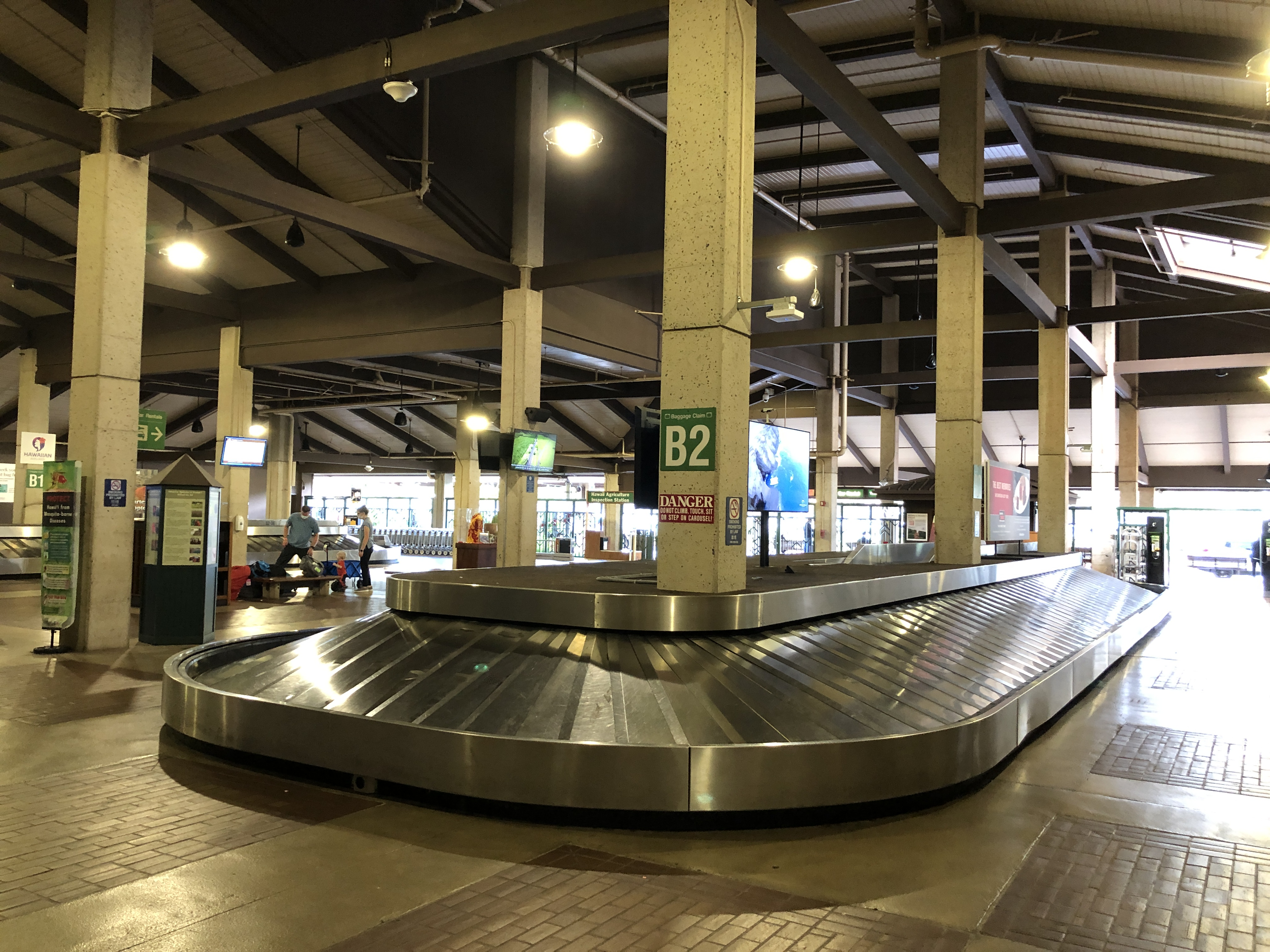
Lihue Airport Baggage Claim

== Airlines and destinations ==
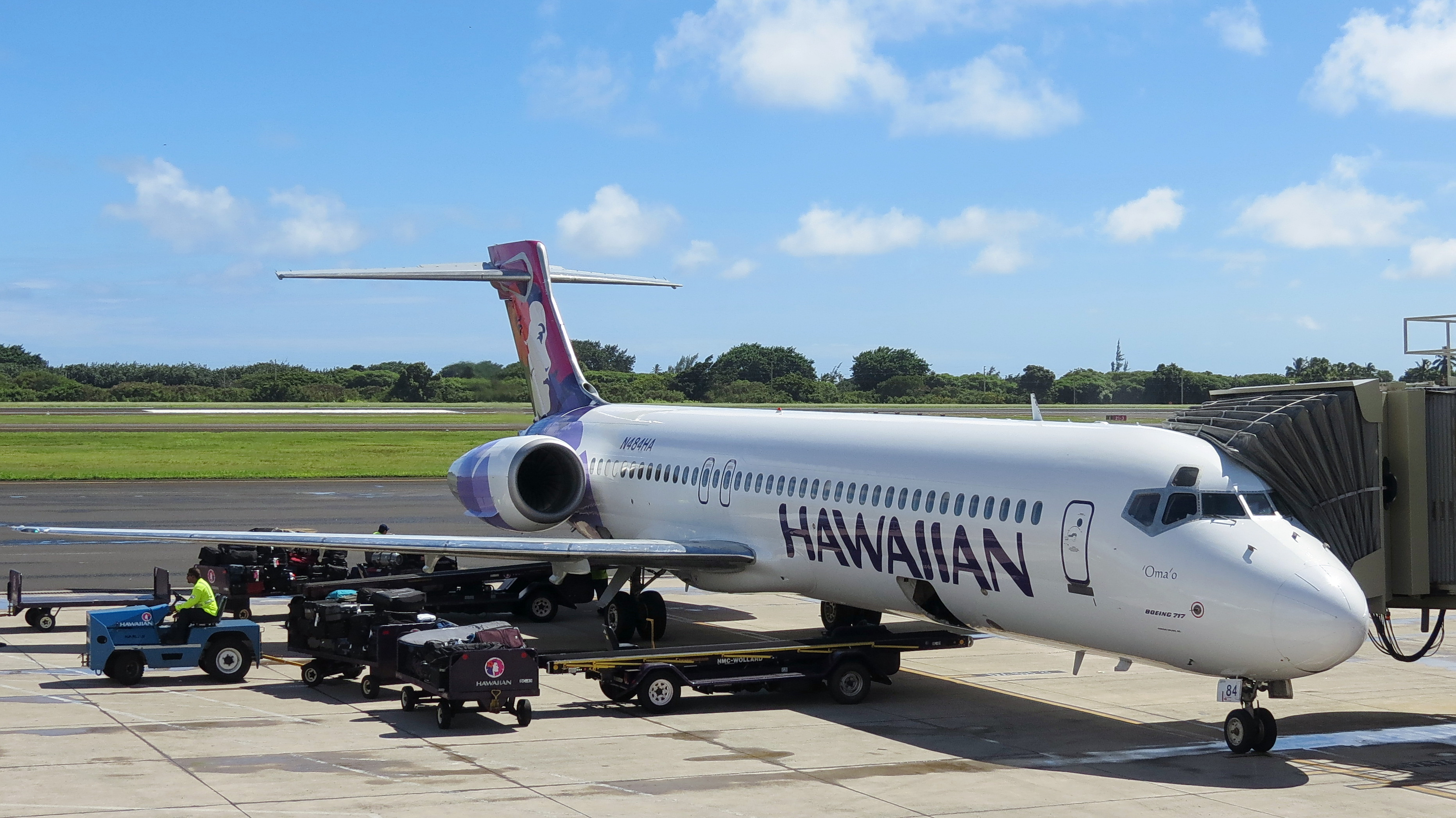
A Hawaiian Airlines Boeing 717 at the gate

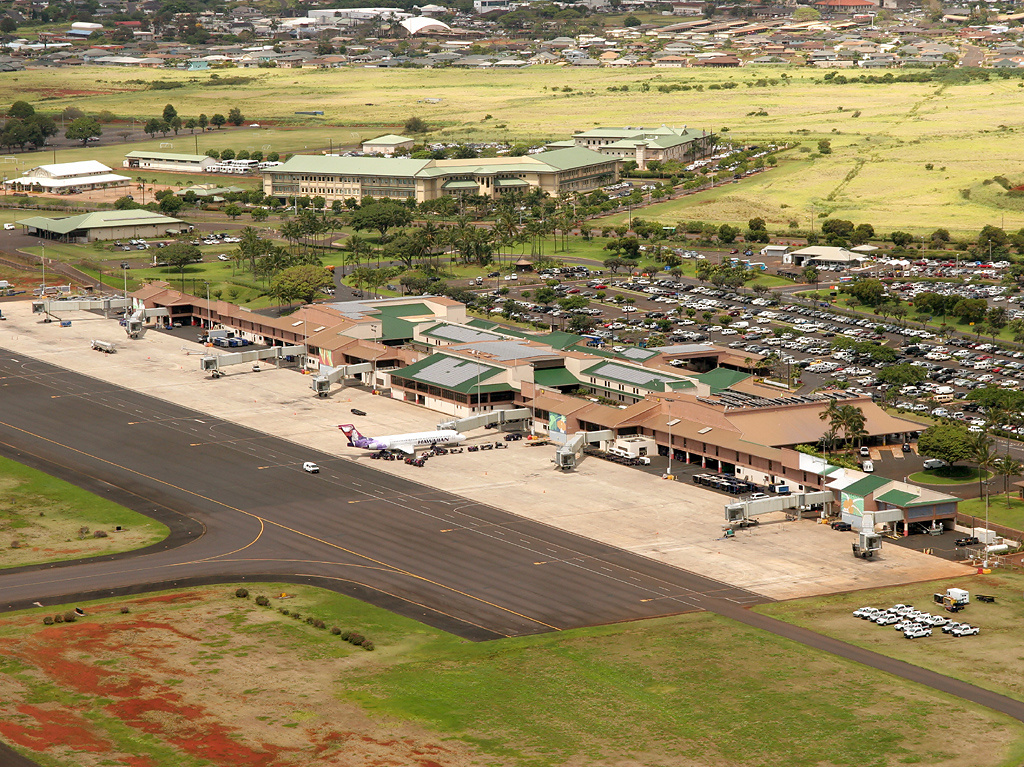
Terminal

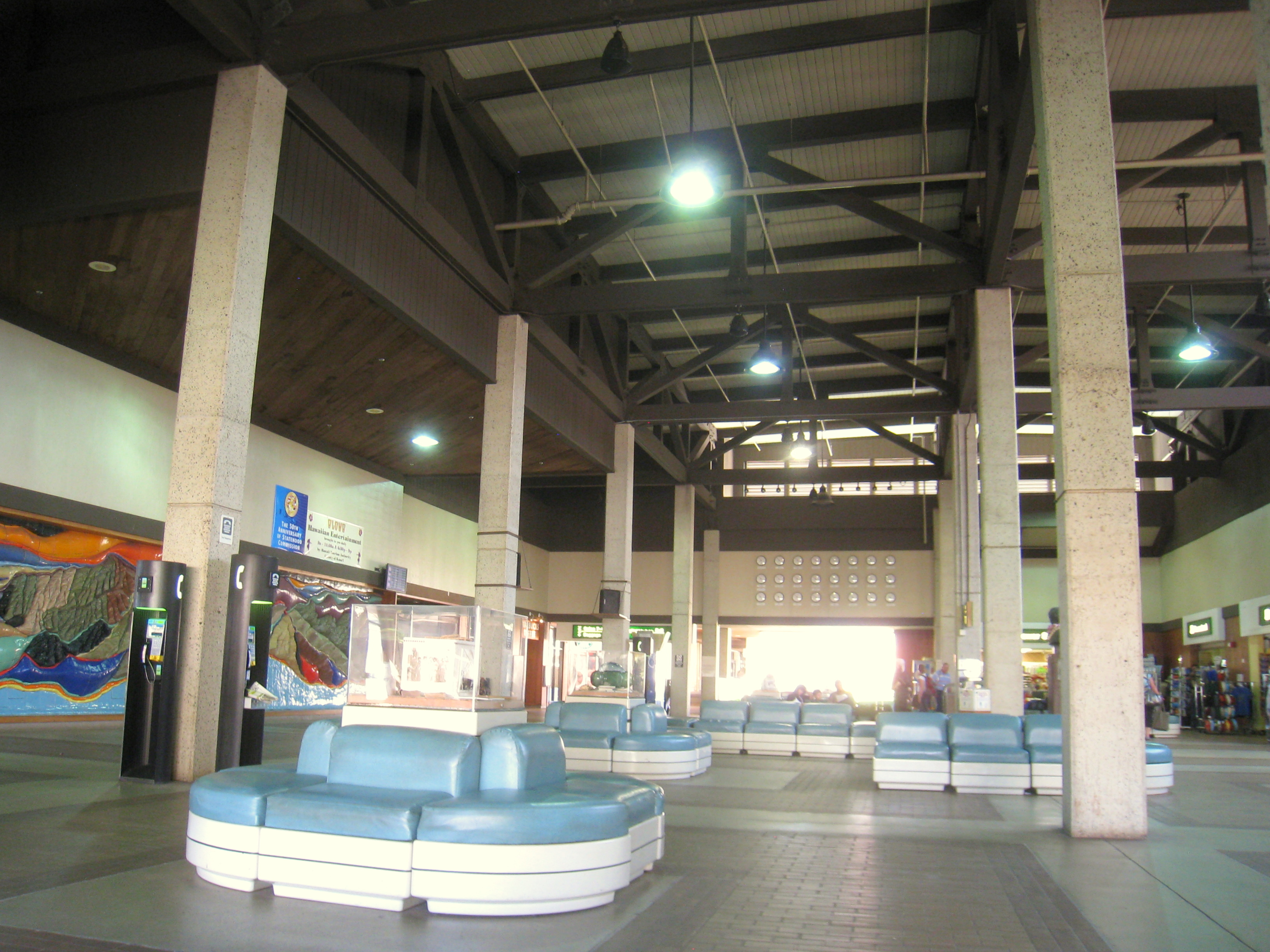
Inside the airport terminal

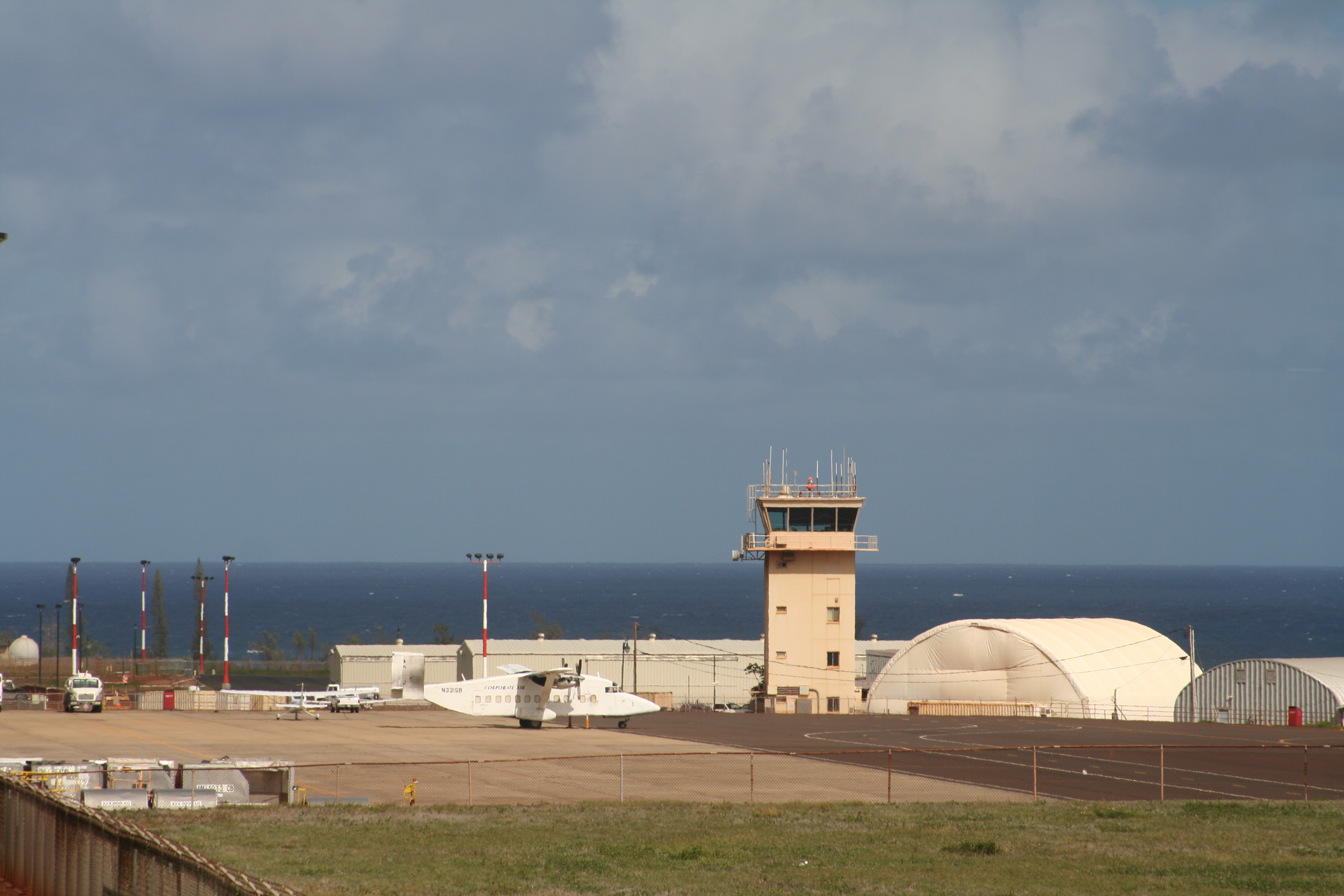
ATC tower

Airlines	Destinations
Alaska Airlines	Portland (OR), San Diego, San Francisco, Seattle/Tacoma
American Airlines	Los Angeles, Phoenix–Sky Harbor
Delta Air Lines	Los Angeles, Seattle/Tacoma
Hawaiian Airlines	Honolulu, Kahului, Kailua-Kona, Los Angeles, Oakland, Sacramento, San Jose (CA)
Southwest Airlines	Honolulu, Kahului, Las Vegas, Oakland; Seasonal: Los Angeles
United Airlines	Denver, Los Angeles, San Francisco

== Statistics ==
=== Top domestic destinations ===
Busiest domestic routes from LIH (September 2025 – August 2026)
Rank	City	Passengers	Airlines
1	Honolulu, HI	721,250	Hawaiian, Southwest
2	Los Angeles, CA	250,420	American, Delta, Hawaiian, Southwest, United
3	Seattle, WA	152,670	Alaska, Delta
4	San Francisco, CA	122,280	Alaska, United
5	Kahului, HI	120,230	Hawaiian, Southwest
6	Oakland, CA	90,170	Hawaiian, Southwest
7	Phoenix, AZ	64,600	American
8	Denver, CO	58,300	United
9	Las Vegas, NV	56,580	Southwest
10	Portland, OR	38,730	Alaska

=== Airline market share ===
Busiest airlines serving LIH (September 2025 – August 2026)
Rank	Airline	Passengers	Share
1	Alaska Airlines	1,533,000	42.61%
2	Southwest Airlines	620,000	17.23%
3	Hawaiian Airlines	525,000	14.60%
4	United Airlines	407,000	11.32%
5	American Airlines	274,000	7.60%
6	Other	239,000	6.64%

== Public transport ==
The Kauaʻi Bus route 100/200 connects the airport to downtown Lihue.

== Accidents and incidents ==
- On January 14, 2008, an Alpine Air Express Beechcraft 1900C-1 carrying 4,200 lbs. of mail crashed 11 km S of Lihue Airport due to spatial disorientation and loss of situational awareness in darkness, along with monitoring cockpit instruments and an aircraft ahead. The sole occupant, the pilot, was killed.
- On December 15, 2022, a Beechcraft Model 77 Skipper belonging to the Civil Air Patrol crashed into a chain link fence shortly after takeoff. The pilot and his young son suffered non-life threatening injuries.

== See also ==
- List of airports in Hawaii
