= Hanamāʻulu, Hawaii =

Hanamāʻulu, Hawaiʻi
- Census-designated place
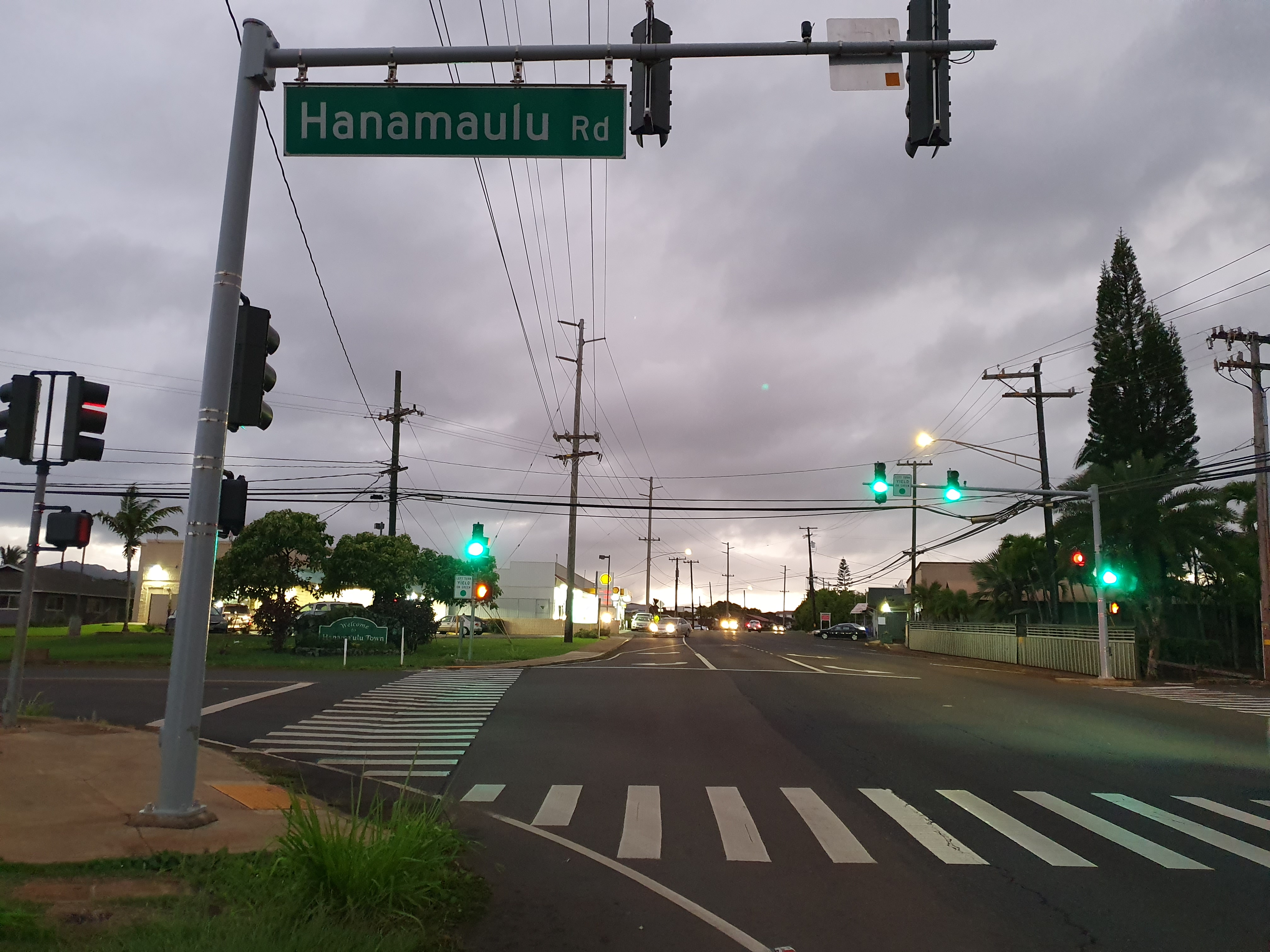

- Location in Kauaʻi County and the state of Hawaii
- Coordinates: 21°59′51″N 159°21′26″W
- Country: United States
- State: Hawaii
- County: Kauaʻi

Area
  - Total: 1.45 sq mi (3.75 km^{2})
  - Land: 1.27 sq mi (3.29 km^{2})
  - Water: 0.18 sq mi (0.46 km^{2})
- Elevation: 397 ft (121 m)

Population (2020)
  - Total: 4,994
  - Density: 3,926.6/sq mi (1,516.08/km^{2})
- Time zone: UTC-10 (Hawaii-Aleutian)
- ZIP code: 96766
- Area code: 808
- FIPS code: 15-11650
- GNIS feature ID: 0359050

Hanamāʻulu (literally, "tired bay" in Hawaiian) is a census-designated place (CDP) in Kauaʻi County, Hawaiʻi, United States. It is the ancient birthplace of Kawelo, a member of Kauai's ruling family. The population was 4,994 at the 2020 census, up from 3,272 at the 2000 census.

== Geography ==
Hanamāʻulu is located on the east side of the island of Kauaʻi at 21°59′51″N 159°21′26″W (21.997387, -159.357133). It is bordered to the south by Lihue, with Hanamaulu Stream forming the boundary between the two communities.

According to the United States Census Bureau, the CDP has a total area of 1.4 square miles (3.7 km^{2}), of which 1.3 square miles (3.3 km^{2}) are land and 0.19 square miles (0.5 km^{2}), or 12.25%, are water. The water area is primarily the north side of Hanamaulu Bay.

== Demographics ==
Historical population
Census	Pop.	Note	%±
2020	4,994		—
U.S. Decennial Census

As of the census of 2000, there were 3,272 people, 902 households, and 738 families residing in the CDP. The population density was 2,907.8 inhabitants per square mile (1,122.7/km^{2}). There were 947 housing units at an average density of 841.6 per square mile (324.9/km^{2}). The racial makeup of the CDP was 8.2% White, 0.2% African American, 0.2% Native American, 61.5% Asian, 5.8% Pacific Islander, 0.5% from other races, and 23.7% from two or more races. Hispanic or Latino of any race were 6.8% of the population.

There were 902 households, out of which 35.3% had children under the age of 18 living with them, 55.2% were married couples living together, 19.7% had a female householder with no husband present, and 18.1% were non-families. 13.5% of all households were made up of individuals, and 5.1% had someone living alone who was 65 years of age or older. The average household size was 3.62 and the average family size was 3.87.

In the CDP the population was spread out, with 26.7% under the age of 18, 9.8% from 18 to 24, 25.8% from 25 to 44, 22.6% from 45 to 64, and 15.1% who were 65 years of age or older. The median age was 35 years. For every 100 females, there were 96.3 males. For every 100 females age 18 and over, there were 92.2 males.

The median income for a household in the CDP was $48,239, and the median income for a family was $51,042. Males had a median income of $26,962 versus $23,237 for females. The per capita income for the CDP was $16,233. About 7.9% of families and 10.0% of the population were below the poverty line, including 13.0% of those under age 18 and 4.3% of those age 65 or over.
