= 1976 United States presidential election in Hawaii =

- November 2, 1976

Nominee	Jimmy Carter	Gerald Ford
Party	Democratic	Republican
Home state	Georgia	Michigan
Running mate	Walter Mondale	Bob Dole
Electoral vote	4	0
Popular vote	147,375	140,003
Percentage	50.59%	48.06%

Carter
40–50%
50–60%
60–70%
70–80%
Ford
40–50%
50–60%
60–70%
70–80%
90–100%
President before election
Gerald Ford
Republican
Elected President
Jimmy Carter
Democratic

The 1976 United States presidential election in Hawaii took place on November 2, 1976. All fifty states and the District of Columbia were part of the 1976 United States presidential election. Hawaii voters chose four electors to the Electoral College, who voted for president and vice president.

Hawaii was won by Georgia Governor Jimmy Carter by 2.53 points, making Hawaii 0.43% more Democratic than the nation-at-large. Carter did not win any other state fully west of the hundredth meridian, including the Pacific states of Oregon and California admitted before the Civil War.

Had Ford won Hawaii and also carried Ohio, he would have been elected president.

== Results ==
1976 United States presidential election in Hawaii
Party	Candidate	Votes	Percentage	Electoral votes
Democratic	Jimmy Carter	147,375	50.59%	4
Republican	Gerald Ford (incumbent)	140,003	48.06%	0
Libertarian	Roger MacBride	3,923	1.35%	0

=== Results by county ===
County	Jimmy Carter Democratic		Gerald Ford Republican		Roger MacBride Libertarian		Margin		Total votes cast
County	#	%	#	%	#	%	#	%	#
Hawaii	15,960	50.24%	15,366	48.37%	439	1.38%	594	1.87%	31,765
Honolulu	111,389	50.07%	108,041	48.56%	3,046	1.37%	3,348	1.51%	222,476
Kauaʻi	8,105	55.81%	6,278	43.23%	139	0.96%	1,827	12.58%	14,522
Maui	11,921	52.89%	10,318	45.78%	299	1.33%	1,603	7.11%	22,538
Totals	147,375	50.59%	140,003	48.06%	3,923	1.35%	7,372	2.53%	291,301

==== Counties that flipped from Republican to Democratic ====
- Hawaii
- Honolulu
- Kauaʻi
- Maui

=== By congressional district ===
Carter and Ford each won a congressional district.

District	Carter	Ford	Representative
1st	49.3%	50.7%	Cecil Heftel
2nd	53.0%	47.0%	Daniel Akaka
