= 2000 United States presidential election in Hawaii =

- November 7, 2000

Nominee	Al Gore	George W. Bush	Ralph Nader
Party	Democratic	Republican	Green
Home state	Tennessee	Texas	Connecticut
Running mate	Joe Lieberman	Dick Cheney	Winona LaDuke
Electoral vote	4	0	0
Popular vote	205,286	137,845	21,623
Percentage	55.79%	37.46%	5.88%
County results
Gore
50–60%
60–70%
President before election
Bill Clinton
Democratic
Elected President
George W. Bush
Republican

The 2000 United States presidential election in Hawaii was part of the 2000 United States presidential election which took place on November 7, 2000. Voters chose 4 electors to the Electoral College, who voted for president and vice president.

Hawaii was won by Vice President Al Gore by an 18.3% margin of victory. Gore also was victorious in every county and both congressional districts of the state. Governor George W. Bush received 37.5% of the vote, while Nader obtained almost 6%. Bush's best county result came in Honolulu County where he received 39.6% of the vote. This was the first election since its statehood in which it did not support the same candidate as West Virginia.

== General election ==
=== Polling ===
Poll source	Date(s)	Sample size	Margin of error	George W. Bush (R)	Al Gore (D)	Ralph Nader (G)	Other / undecided (Note: Calculated by taking the difference of 100% and all other candidates combined.)
Harris Insights & Analytics	November 3, 2000	589	—	38%	53%	7%	2%
Ward Research	October 22, 2000	261	—	31%	50%	6%	13%

=== Results ===
2000 United States presidential election in Hawaii
Party	Candidate	Votes	Percentage	Electoral votes
Democratic	Al Gore	205,286	55.79%	4
Republican	George W. Bush	137,845	37.46%	0
Green	Ralph Nader	21,623	5.88%	0
Libertarian	Harry Browne	1,477	0.40%	0
Reform Party	Pat Buchanan	1,071	0.29%	0
Constitution	Howard Phillips	343	0.09%	0
Natural Law	John Hagelin	306	0.08%	0
Totals		367,951	100.0%	4

==== By county ====
County	Al Gore Democratic		George W. Bush Republican		Various candidates Other parties		Margin		Total votes cast
County	#	%	#	%	#	%	#	%	Total votes cast
Hawaii	28,670	56.37%	17,050	33.52%	5,140	10.11%	11,620	22.85%	50,860
Honolulu	139,618	54.54%	101,310	39.58%	15,062	5.88%	38,308	14.96%	255,990
Kalawao	30	66.67%	11	24.44%	4	8.89%	19	42.23%	45
Kauaʻi	13,470	61.87%	6,583	30.23%	1,720	7.90%	6,887	31.64%	21,773
Maui	23,484	59.83%	12,876	32.81%	2,888	7.36%	10,608	27.02%	39,248
Totals	205,286	55.79%	137,845	37.46%	24,820	6.75%	67,441	18.33%	367,951

==== By congressional district ====
Gore won both congressional districts.

District	Gore	Bush	Representative
1st	55%	39%	Neil Abercrombie
2nd	56%	36%	Patsy Mink

== Electors ==
Technically the voters of Hawaii cast their ballots for electors: representatives to the Electoral College. Hawaii is allocated 4 electors because it has 2 congressional districts and 2 senators. All candidates who appear on the ballot or qualify to receive write-in votes must submit a list of 4 electors, who pledge to vote for their candidate and their running mate. Whoever wins the majority of votes in the state is awarded all 4 electoral votes. Their chosen electors then vote for president and vice president. Although electors are pledged to their candidate and running mate, they are not obligated to vote for them. An elector who votes for someone other than their candidate is known as a faithless elector.

The electors of each state and the District of Columbia met on December 18, 2000 to cast their votes for president and vice president. The Electoral College itself never meets as one body. Instead the electors from each state and the District of Columbia met in their respective capitols.

The following were the members of the Electoral College from the state. All were pledged to and voted for Al Gore and Joe Lieberman:

1. Michael Amii
2. Marsha Joyner
3. Joy Kobashigawa Lewis
4. Pedro Racelis
