= 1968 United States presidential election in Hawaii =

- November 5, 1968

Nominee	Hubert Humphrey	Richard Nixon
Party	Democratic	Republican
Home state	Minnesota	New York
Running mate	Edmund Muskie	Spiro Agnew
Electoral vote	4	0
Popular vote	141,324	91,425
Percentage	59.83%	38.70%
County results
Humphrey
50–60%
60–70%
President before election
Lyndon B. Johnson
Democratic
Elected President
Richard Nixon
Republican

The 1968 United States presidential election in Hawaii took place on November 5, 1968. All 50 states and the District of Columbia, were part of the 1968 United States presidential election. Hawaii voters chose 4 electors to the Electoral College, which selected the president and vice president.

Hawaii overwhelmingly voted for the Democratic Party nominee Vice President Hubert Humphrey of Minnesota with Edmund Muskie against Republican Party candidate, former Vice President Richard Nixon of New York with Spiro Agnew. Hawaii weighed in for this election as 22% more Democratic than the national average, with Humphrey winning the state by a 21% margin.

Hawaii would prove to be the weakest state for the American Independent Party candidate, former Alabama governor George Wallace, who won 3,469 votes, amounting to a total of around 1%. Being the only state in the country to have a plurality of non-white residents, mainly Asian Americans and Pacific Islanders, Wallace's strong segregationist views failed to make any significant impact on the state's electorate, especially since he was far beyond his base of support in the Deep South.

== Results ==
1968 United States presidential election in Hawaii
Party	Candidate	Votes	Percentage	Electoral votes
Democratic	Hubert Humphrey	141,324	59.83%	4
Republican	Richard Nixon	91,425	38.70%	0
American Independent	George Wallace	3,469	1.47%	0

=== Results by county ===
County	Hubert Humphrey Democratic		Richard Nixon Republican		George Wallace American Independent		Margin		Total votes cast
County	#	%	#	%	#	%	#	%	Total votes cast
Hawaii	15,819	61.49%	9,625	37.41%	283	1.10%	6,194	24.08%	25,727
Honolulu	108,141	59.35%	71,259	39.11%	2,794	1.54%	36,882	20.24%	182,194
Kauaʻi	7,051	62.15%	4,140	36.49%	155	1.36%	2,911	25.66%	11,346
Maui	10,313	60.84%	6,401	37.76%	237	1.40%	3,912	23.08%	16,951
Totals	141,324	59.83%	91,425	38.70%	3,469	1.47%	49,899	21.13%	236,218

== See also ==
- Presidency of Richard Nixon
