= 1964 United States presidential election in Hawaii =

- November 3, 1964

Nominee	Lyndon B. Johnson	Barry Goldwater
Party	Democratic	Republican
Home state	Texas	Arizona
Running mate	Hubert Humphrey	William E. Miller
Electoral vote	4	0
Popular vote	163,249	44,022
Percentage	78.76%	21.24%
County results
Johnson
70–80%
80–90%
President before election
Lyndon B. Johnson
Democratic
Elected President
Lyndon B. Johnson
Democratic

The 1964 United States presidential election in Hawaii took place on November 7, 1964. All 50 states and the District of Columbia, were part of the 1964 United States presidential election. Hawaii voters chose 4 electors to the Electoral College, which selected the president and vice president of the United States.

Hawaii was won by incumbent United States President Lyndon B. Johnson of Texas, who was running against Senator Barry Goldwater of Arizona. Johnson ran for a second time with Senator Hubert Humphrey of Minnesota, and Goldwater ran with U.S. Representative William E. Miller of New York.

This would be the first of three times Hawaii was won by a Democratic presidential candidate with over 70% of the vote, the other two times being Barack Obama - who was born in the state - in 2008 and 2012, although by around 7-8 points less than Johnson's victory. This would also be the only time that a candidate won Hawaii with over 75% of the vote.

President Lyndon B. Johnson won the State of Hawaii by an absolute sweep-out landslide of 57.6 percentage points. It was the Johnson–Humphrey ticket's third largest margin in a single jurisdiction. Since being granted votes in the Electoral College, no presidential candidate has ever won a larger percentage of the vote in the state than Johnson.

== Results ==
1964 United States presidential election in Hawaii
Party	Candidate	Votes	Percentage	Electoral votes
Democratic	Lyndon B. Johnson (incumbent)	163,249	78.76%	4
Republican	Barry Goldwater	44,022	21.24%	0
Socialist Labor	Eric Hass	-	-	-

=== Results by county ===
County	Lyndon B. Johnson Democratic		Barry Goldwater Republican		Margin		Total votes cast
County	#	%	#	%	#	%	Total votes cast
Hawaii	20,011	80.13%	4,962	19.87%	15,049	60.26%	24,973
Honolulu	121,859	78.42%	33,536	21.58%	88,323	56.84%	155,395
Kauaʻi	8,713	81.55%	1,971	18.45%	6,742	63.10%	10,684
Maui	12,666	78.09%	3,553	21.91%	9,113	56.18%	16,219
Totals	163,249	78.76%	44,022	21.24%	119,227	57.52%	207,271

==== Counties that flipped from Republican to Democratic ====
- Hawaii
- Kauaʻi
- Maui

== See also ==
- Presidency of Lyndon B. Johnson
