= 1996 United States presidential election in Hawaii =

- November 5, 1996

| Nominee | Bill Clinton | Bob Dole | Ross Perot |
| Party | Democratic | Republican | Reform |
| Home state | Arkansas | Kansas | Texas |
| Running mate | Al Gore | Jack Kemp | Pat Choate |
| Electoral vote | 4 | 0 | 0 |
| Popular vote | 205,012 | 113,943 | 27,358 |
| Percentage | 56.93% | 31.64% | 7.60% |
County results
Clinton
50–60%
60–70%
70–80%
President before election
Bill Clinton
Democratic
Elected President
Bill Clinton
Democratic

The 1996 United States presidential election in Hawaii took place on November 5, 1996, as part of the 1996 United States presidential election. Voters chose 4 representatives, or electors to the Electoral College, who voted for president and vice president.

Hawaii was won by President Bill Clinton (D) over Senator Bob Dole (R-KS), with Clinton winning 56.93% to 31.64% by a margin of 25.29%. Billionaire businessman Ross Perot (Reform Party of the United States of America-TX) finished in third, with 7.6% of the popular vote.

== Results ==
1996 United States presidential election in Hawaii
| Party | Candidate | Running mate | Votes | Percentage | Electoral votes |
|---|---|---|---|---|---|
| Democratic | Bill Clinton (incumbent) | Al Gore (incumbent) | 205,012 | 56.93% | 4 |
| Republican | Bob Dole | Jack Kemp | 113,943 | 31.64% | 0 |
| Reform | Ross Perot | Pat Choate | 27,358 | 7.60% | 0 |
| Green | Ralph Nader | Winona LaDuke | 10,386 | 2.88% | 0 |
| Libertarian | Harry Browne | Jo Jorgensen | 2,493 | 0.69% | 0 |
| Natural Law | Dr. John Hagelin | Dr. V. Tompkins | 570 | 0.16% | 0 |
| U.S. Taxpayers' Party | Howard Phillips | Herbert Titus | 358 | 0.10% | 0 |
| Totals | | | 360,120 | 100.0% | 4 |

=== By county ===
| County | Bill Clinton Democratic | | Bob Dole Republican | | Various candidates Other parties | | Margin | | Total votes cast |
| County | # | % | # | % | # | % | # | % | Total votes cast |
|---|---|---|---|---|---|---|---|---|---|
| Hawaii | 27,262 | 55.66% | 13,516 | 27.60% | 8,199 | 16.74% | 13,746 | 28.06% | 48,977 |
| Honolulu | 143,793 | 56.33% | 85,779 | 33.61% | 25,684 | 10.06% | 58,014 | 22.72% | 255,256 |
| Kalawao | 46 | 73.02% | 13 | 20.63% | 4 | 6.35% | 33 | 52.39% | 63 |
| Kauaʻi | 13,357 | 63.54% | 5,325 | 25.33% | 2,338 | 11.13% | 8,032 | 38.21% | 21,020 |
| Maui | 20,600 | 59.08% | 9,323 | 26.74% | 4,944 | 14.18% | 11,277 | 32.34% | 34,867 |
| Totals | 205,012 | 56.93% | 113,943 | 31.64% | 41,165 | 11.43% | 91,069 | 25.29% | 360,120 |
