= 1972 United States presidential election in Hawaii =

- November 7, 1972

Nominee	Richard Nixon	George McGovern
Party	Republican	Democratic
Home state	California	South Dakota
Running mate	Spiro Agnew	Sargent Shriver
Electoral vote	4	0
Popular vote	168,865	101,409
Percentage	62.48%	37.52%
County results
Nixon
50–60%
60–70%
President before election
Richard Nixon
Republican
Elected President
Richard Nixon
Republican

The 1972 United States presidential election in Hawaii took place on November 7, 1972. All 50 states and the District of Columbia, were part of the 1972 United States presidential election. Hawaii voters chose 4 electors to the Electoral College, which selected the president and vice president.

Hawaii was won by incumbent United States President Richard Nixon of California, who was running against Senator George McGovern of South Dakota. Nixon ran for a second time with former Governor Spiro Agnew of Maryland, and McGovern ran with former U.S. Ambassador to France Sargent Shriver of Maryland.

Nixon won the election in Hawaii with a decisive 25-point landslide, with a clear majority in all four counties. Nixon was the first Republican to win the state of Hawaii and the only one until Ronald Reagan won the state in 1984. Hawaii's result was 1.76% more Republican than the nation at large. This marks the only time in which Hawaii voted to the right of Alaska, and the last time Hawaii voted more Republican than the nation. It is also the first of only two times in the state's history that a Republican candidate for any office has won over 60% of the state's vote (alongside the re-election victory of Governor Lingle in 2006), or has even won 60% of the vote in any of the state's counties.

Nixon was the first Republican to carry Honolulu County. This was the first of three times in which Oahu supported the Republican candidate for president.

== Results ==
1972 United States presidential election in Hawaii
Party	Candidate	Votes	Percentage	Electoral votes
Republican	Richard Nixon (incumbent)	168,865	62.48%	4
Democratic	George McGovern	101,409	37.52%	0
Libertarian	John Hospers	-	-	-
American Independent	John G. Schmitz	-	-	-

=== Results by county ===
County	Richard Nixon Republican		George McGovern Democratic		Margin		Total votes cast
County	#	%	#	%	#	%	Total votes cast
Hawaii	16,832	59.09%	11,652	40.91%	5,180	18.18%	28,484
Honolulu	132,844	63.32%	76,957	36.68%	55,887	26.64%	209,801
Kauaʻi	7,571	58.36%	5,401	41.64%	2,170	16.72%	12,972
Maui	11,618	61.09%	7,399	38.91%	4,219	22.18%	19,017
Totals	168,865	62.48%	101,409	37.52%	67,456	24.96%	270,274

== See also ==
- Watergate scandal
