= Puhi, Hawaii =

Puhi
- Census-designated place
- Location in Kauaʻi County and the state of Hawaii
- Coordinates: 21°58′7″N 159°23′54″W
- Country: United States
- State: Hawaii
- County: Kauaʻi

Area
  - Total: 0.89 sq mi (2.31 km^{2})
  - Land: 0.89 sq mi (2.30 km^{2})
  - Water: 0.0039 sq mi (0.01 km^{2})
- Elevation: 344 ft (105 m)

Population (2020)
  - Total: 3,380
  - Density: 3,802.3/sq mi (1,468.07/km^{2})
- Time zone: UTC-10 (Hawaii-Aleutian)
- ZIP code: 96766
- Area code: 808
- FIPS code: 15-65750
- GNIS feature ID: 0363494

Puhi (literally, "blow" in Hawaiian) is a census-designated place (CDP) in Kauaʻi County, Hawaiʻi, United States. The population was 3,380 at the 2020 census, up from 1,186 at the 2000 census.

== Geography ==
Puhi is on the southeastern side of the island of Kauaʻi at 21°58′7″N 159°23′54″W (21.968479, -159.398248). It is 2 miles (3 km) west of Lihue, the Kauai county seat.

According to the United States Census Bureau, the Puhi CDP has an area of 0.9 square miles (2.3 km^{2}), up from 0.4 square miles (1.0 km^{2}) in 2000. 2.5 acres (0.01 km^{2}), or 0.50%, of the area is water.

== Demographics ==
Historical population
Census	Pop.	Note	%±
2020	3,380		—
U.S. Decennial Census

=== 2020 census ===
As of the 2020 census, Puhi had a population of 3,380. The median age was 40.3 years. 22.3% of residents were under the age of 18 and 14.2% of residents were 65 years of age or older. For every 100 females there were 95.9 males, and for every 100 females age 18 and over there were 95.5 males age 18 and over.

100.0% of residents lived in urban areas, while 0.0% lived in rural areas.

There were 1,040 households in Puhi, of which 35.0% had children under the age of 18 living in them. Of all households, 50.9% were married-couple households, 16.6% were households with a male householder and no spouse or partner present, and 23.9% were households with a female householder and no spouse or partner present. About 18.4% of all households were made up of individuals and 7.7% had someone living alone who was 65 years of age or older.

There were 1,087 housing units, of which 4.3% were vacant. The homeowner vacancy rate was 0.5% and the rental vacancy rate was 6.6%.

Racial composition as of the 2020 census
Race	Number	Percent
White	615	18.2%
Black or African American	12	0.4%
American Indian and Alaska Native	6	0.2%
Asian	1,673	49.5%
Native Hawaiian and Other Pacific Islander	224	6.6%
Some other race	36	1.1%
Two or more races	814	24.1%
Hispanic or Latino (of any race)	299	8.8%

=== 2000 census ===
As of the census of 2000, there were 1,186 people, 285 households, and 255 families residing in the CDP. The population density was 3,328.7 inhabitants per square mile (1,285.2/km^{2}). There were 297 housing units at an average density of 833.6 per square mile (321.9/km^{2}). The racial makeup of the CDP was 8.3% White, 0.2% African American, 0.7% Native American, 65.7% Asian, 2.5% Pacific Islander, 0.3% from other races, and 22.4% from two or more races. Hispanic or Latino of any race were 7.8% of the population.

There were 285 households, out of which 37.9% had children under the age of 18 living with them, 71.2% were married couples living together, 10.2% had a female householder with no husband present, and 10.5% were non-families. 6.3% of all households were made up of individuals, and 2.8% had someone living alone who was 65 years of age or older. The average household size was 4.16 and the average family size was 4.13.

In the CDP the population was spread out, with 26.7% under the age of 18, 10.1% from 18 to 24, 27.3% from 25 to 44, 20.7% from 45 to 64, and 15.1% who were 65 years of age or older. The median age was 36 years. For every 100 females, there were 97.3 males. For every 100 females age 18 and over, there were 103.0 males.

The median income for a household in the CDP was $51,563, and the median income for a family was $50,000. Males had a median income of $27,625 versus $22,933 for females. The per capita income for the CDP was $16,175. About 4.5% of families and 7.2% of the population were below the poverty line, including 14.3% of those under age 18 and 1.9% of those age 65 or over.

== See also ==
- Huleia National Wildlife Refuge
- Kipu Falls
