= Island School (Hawaii) =

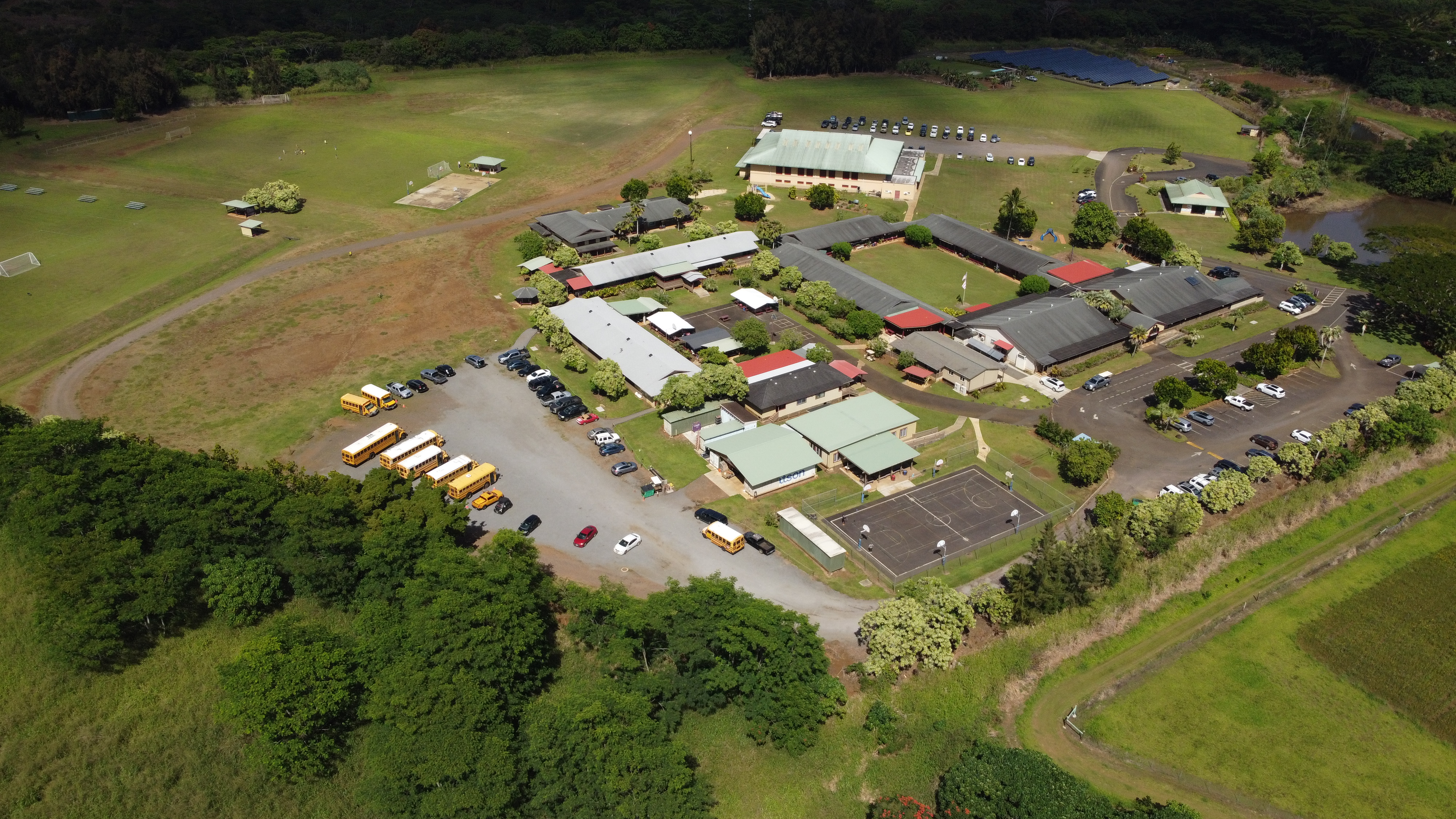
- Aerial view of the school in 2022.

Location
- 3-1875 Kaumualii Highway; Lihue, Hawaii 96766; United States; 21°58′22″N 159°23′56″W

Information
- Type: Private college-preparatory school
- Established: 1977
- NCES School ID: 00327106
- Head of school: Nancy Nagramada
- Teaching staff: 44.1 (on an FTE basis)
- Grades: PK–12
- Gender: Co-educational
- Enrollment: 501 (2023-2024)
- Student to teacher ratio: 8.3
- Campus size: 34.9 Acres
- Campus type: Urban
- Colors: Blue and Gold
- Athletics conference: Kauai Interscholastic Federation
- Nickname: Voyagers
- Website: www.ischool.org

Island School is a private, co-educational, college-preparatory school in Lihue, Hawaii, United States. It is located behind the University of Hawaii's Kauaʻi Community College campus.

== History ==
In January 1977, Island School began with 12 students ranging up to eighth grade. Within four years, enrollment was up to 68 and its high school had been established. By 1983, Island School had graduated only eight students and the high school was disestablished. In 1996, the high school was re-opened due to rising enrollment. Island School began graduating seniors again starting with the Class of 2000. Today, Island School is a fully accredited college preparatory institution.

In September 1991, the campus was moved from Kealia (on the east side) to its present location in Puhi. Island School used several portable classrooms at the Puhi campus, all of which were destroyed by Hurricane Iniki in September 1992. Other buildings were obliterated or severely damaged by the hurricane. The school re-opened 11 days later by utilizing various off-campus facilities scattered around the island. The permanent campus at Puhi was entirely restored within two years.

== Notable alumni ==
- Dianna Cowern (Class of 2007), Science and Physics communicator and YouTuber.
- Sydney Agudong (Class of 2018), Actress and singer.
- Kiʻilani Arruda (Class of 2020), Beauty pageant and winner of Miss Teen USA 2020.
