= Līhuʻe, Hawaii =

Līhuʻe
- Census-designated place
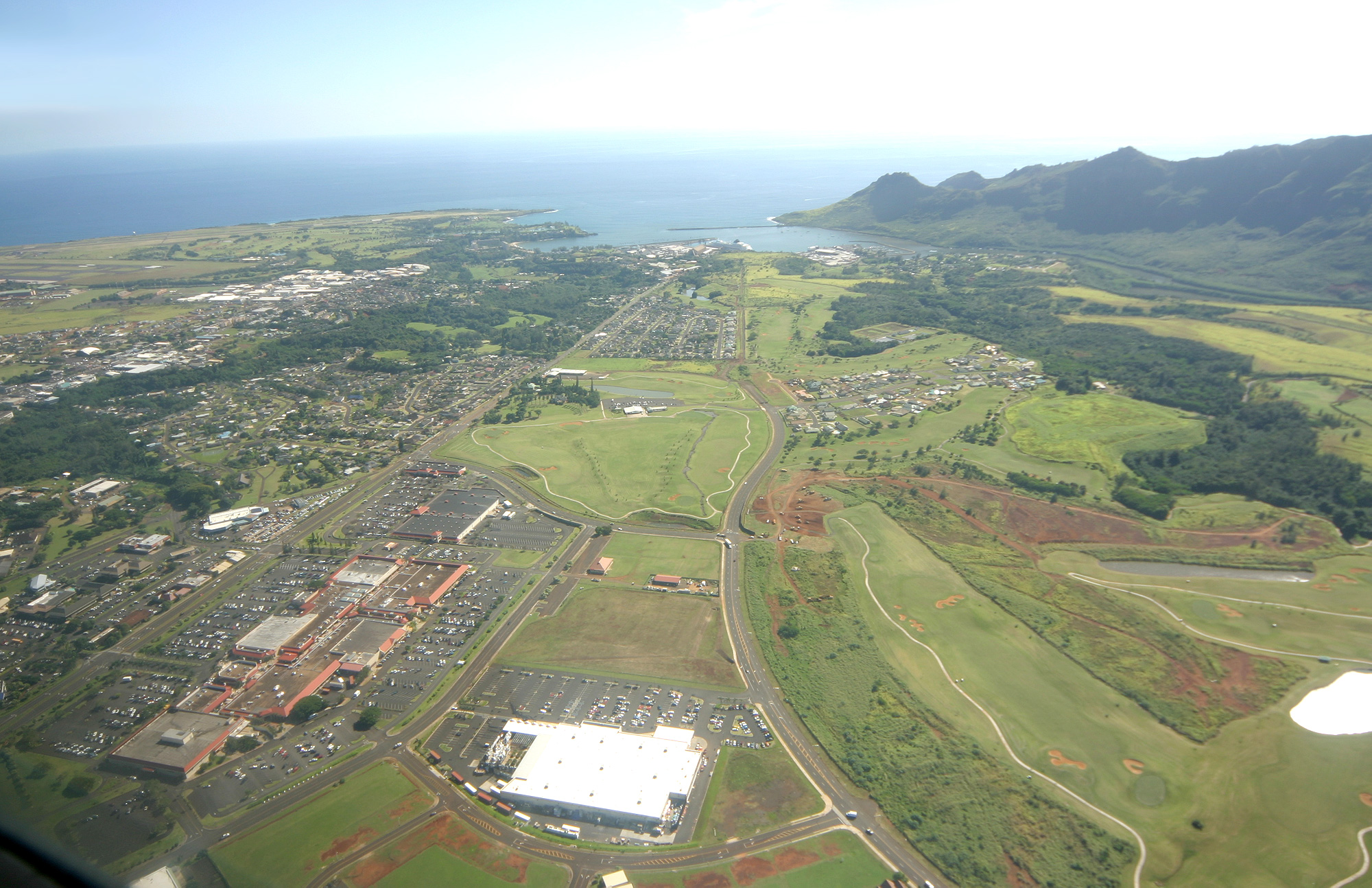
- Aerial view of Līhuʻe

- Location in Kauaʻi County and the state of Hawaii
- Coordinates: 21°58′29″N 159°21′56″W
- Country: United States
- State: Hawaii
- County: Kauaʻi

Area
  - Total: 8.24 sq mi (21.33 km^{2})
  - Land: 7.46 sq mi (19.32 km^{2})
  - Water: 0.78 sq mi (2.01 km^{2})
- Elevation: 220 ft (67 m)

Population (2020)
  - Total: 8,004
  - Density: 1,073.0/sq mi (414.27/km^{2})
- Time zone: UTC−10 (Hawaii-Aleutian)
- ZIP code: 96766
- Area code: 808
- FIPS code: 15-45200
- GNIS feature ID: 0361837

Līhuʻe (Hawaiian pronunciation: [liːˈhuʔe]), sometimes written as Lihue, is an unincorporated community, census-designated place (CDP) and the county seat of Kauaʻi County, Hawaii, United States. Līhuʻe is the second-largest town on the Hawaiian island of Kauaʻi, following Kapaʻa. As of the 2010 census, the CDP had a population of 6,455, up from 5,694 at the 2000 census.

== History ==
In ancient times, Līhuʻe was a small village. Līhuʻe means "cold chill" in the Hawaiian language. Līhuʻe is in the ancient district of Puna, the southeastern coast of the island, and the land division (ahupuaʻa) of Kalapaki. Royal Governor Kaikioʻewa officially made it his governing seat in 1837, moving it from Waimea; he named the town after land he owned on Oahu by the same name.

With the emergence of the sugar industry in the 1800s, Līhuʻe became the central city of the island with the construction of a large sugar mill. Early investors were Henry A. Peirce, Charles Reed Bishop and William Little Lee. The plantation struggled until William Harrison Rice built the first irrigation system in 1856.

Subsequent plantation owner Paul Isenberg helped German people emigrate to Līhuʻe starting in 1881, with the first Lutheran church in Hawaii founded in 1883. Services were held in German well into the 1960s. By the 1930s, George Norton Wilcox became one of the largest sugarcane plantation owners, buying Grove Farm from Hermann A. Widemann. Līhuʻe also houses the Kauaʻi Museum, which details the history of Kauaʻi.

== Geography and climate ==
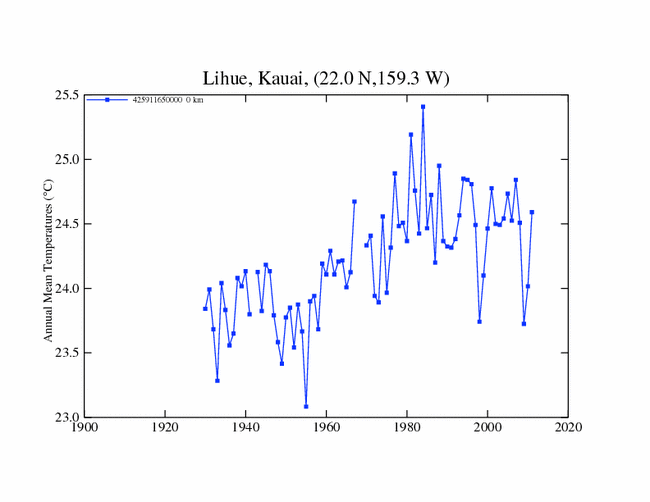
Air thermography, 1929 to 2012

Līhuʻe is on the eastern side of the island of Kauaʻi, bordered by Hanamaulu to the north and Puhi to the west. Its shorefront on the Kauaʻi Channel of the Pacific Ocean extends from Hanamaulu Bay in the north to the larger Nawiliwili Bay to the south. Hawaii Route 50 leads west from Līhuʻe 12 miles (19 km) to Kalaheo and beyond to the western side of the island, while Hawaii Route 56 leads north 7 miles (11 km) to Kapaʻa and onwards to the northern side of the island.

According to the United States Census Bureau, the Līhuʻe CDP has an area of 50 square kilometres (19.3 sq mi), of which 6.7 square miles (17.3 km^{2}) is land and 0.77 square miles (2.0 km^{2}), or 10.42%, is water.

Līhuʻe has a tropical wet and dry climate zone (Köppen classification As) with a relatively dry summer season. The normal monthly mean temperature ranges from 71.6 °F (22.0 °C) in February to 79.7 °F (26.5 °C) in August. On average, there are 7.7 nights annually with a low below 60 °F (16 °C), and readings of 90 °F (32 °C) or higher are quite rare, occurring on average once every eight years. Temperature records range from 46 °F (8 °C) on January 14, 1930 up to only 91 °F (33 °C) as recently as September 4–8, 2019. The record cool daily maximum is 67 °F (19 °C) as recently as December 19, 1981, while, conversely, the record warm daily minimum is 81 °F (27 °C) as recently as September 7–9, 2019.

Normal annual rainfall is 37.05 inches (941 mm) spread over an average 195 days, but observed annual rainfall has ranged from 16.40 to 74.40 inches (417 to 1,890 mm) in 1983 and 1982, respectively. The wettest month on record is March 2006 with 36.13 inches (918 mm), while the most rain to occur in a single calendar day is 15.81 inches (402 mm) on May 13, 1940. The record driest month is February 1983 with trace amounts.

Climate data for Lihue Airport, Hawaii (1991–2020 normals, (Note: Mean monthly maxima and minima (i.e. the expected highest and lowest temperature readings at any point during the year or given month) calculated based on data at said location from 1991 to 2020.) extremes 1905–present) (Note: Records are based on data under "Lihue Area")
Month	Jan	Feb	Mar	Apr	May	Jun	Jul	Aug	Sep	Oct	Nov	Dec	Year
Record high °F (°C)	87 (31)	89 (32)	88 (31)	88 (31)	89 (32)	89 (32)	91 (33)	91 (33)	91 (33)	91 (33)	89 (32)	89 (32)	91 (33)
Mean maximum °F (°C)	82.6 (28.1)	81.9 (27.7)	81.9 (27.7)	82.4 (28.0)	84.2 (29.0)	84.7 (29.3)	86.3 (30.2)	87.0 (30.6)	87.2 (30.7)	86.5 (30.3)	84.1 (28.9)	82.3 (27.9)	88.2 (31.2)
Mean daily maximum °F (°C)	78.6 (25.9)	78.1 (25.6)	78.5 (25.8)	79.8 (26.6)	81.6 (27.6)	83.3 (28.5)	84.6 (29.2)	85.2 (29.6)	85.3 (29.6)	83.9 (28.8)	81.2 (27.3)	79.1 (26.2)	81.6 (27.6)
Daily mean °F (°C)	72.3 (22.4)	72.2 (22.3)	72.9 (22.7)	74.6 (23.7)	76.3 (24.6)	78.3 (25.7)	79.6 (26.4)	80.2 (26.8)	80.0 (26.7)	78.7 (25.9)	76.2 (24.6)	73.9 (23.3)	76.3 (24.6)
Mean daily minimum °F (°C)	66.0 (18.9)	66.2 (19.0)	67.3 (19.6)	69.5 (20.8)	70.9 (21.6)	73.4 (23.0)	74.6 (23.7)	75.2 (24.0)	74.8 (23.8)	73.6 (23.1)	71.3 (21.8)	68.6 (20.3)	71.0 (21.7)
Mean minimum °F (°C)	58.2 (14.6)	58.5 (14.7)	59.6 (15.3)	62.7 (17.1)	64.4 (18.0)	69.1 (20.6)	70.4 (21.3)	71.0 (21.7)	69.8 (21.0)	67.1 (19.5)	64.6 (18.1)	61.2 (16.2)	56.4 (13.6)
Record low °F (°C)	46 (8)	47 (8)	47 (8)	51 (11)	54 (12)	57 (14)	59 (15)	58 (14)	59 (15)	54 (12)	51 (11)	50 (10)	46 (8)
Average rainfall inches (mm)	2.78 (71)	3.63 (92)	5.61 (142)	2.03 (52)	2.18 (55)	1.79 (45)	1.75 (44)	2.33 (59)	2.18 (55)	3.27 (83)	4.03 (102)	4.64 (118)	36.22 (920)
Average rainy days (≥ 0.01 in)	12.0	12.5	15.1	15.5	14.3	17.8	19.3	18.0	16.1	16.9	17.5	17.6	192.6
Average relative humidity (%)	76.1	75.4	75.3	75.2	74.9	73.5	73.9	74.0	74.1	76.2	76.8	76.5	75.2
Mean monthly sunshine hours	176.2	181.7	206.5	202.8	243.6	248.3	257.9	263.3	242.1	207.7	161.4	160.7	2,552.2
Percentage possible sunshine	52	57	55	53	60	61	62	66	66	58	48	48	58
Source: NOAA (relative humidity and sun 1961−1990)

== Demographics ==
Historical population
Census	Pop.	Note	%±
2000	5,694		—
2010	6,455		13.4%
2020	8,004		24.0%
U.S. Decennial Census

As of the census of 2000, there were 5,694 people, 2,178 households, and 1,420 families residing in the CDP. The population density was 898.3 inhabitants per square mile (346.8/km^{2}). There were 2,399 housing units at an average density of 379.8 per square mile (146.6/km^{2}). The racial makeup of the CDP was 22.8% White, 49.2% Asian, 0.2% Black or African American, 0.2% Native American, 6.4% Pacific Islander, 0.7% from other races, and 20.5% from two or more races. 6.5% of the population were Hispanic or Latino of any race.

There were 2,178 households, out of which 25.8% had children under the age of 18 living with them, 48.9% were married couples living together, 11.8% had a female householder with no husband present, and 34.8% were non-families. 29.9% of all households were made up of individuals, and 16.1% had someone living alone who was 65 years of age or older. The average household size was 2.55 and the average family size was 3.16.

In the CDP the population was spread out, with 22.8% under the age of 18, 5.2% from 18 to 24, 23.7% from 25 to 44, 25.8% from 45 to 64, and 22.4% who were 65 years of age or older. The median age was 44 years. For every 100 females, there were 92.2 males. For every 100 females age 18 and over, there were 90.6 males.

The median income for a household in the CDP was $44,906, and the median income for a family was $56,875 in 2000. Males had a median income of $38,713 versus $28,032 for females. The per capita income for the CDP was $22,619. 4.6% of the population and 1.7% of families were below the poverty line. Out of the total population, 1.4% of those under the age of 18 and 7.3% of those 65 and older were living below the poverty line.

== Transportation ==
Līhuʻe is served by Lihue Airport, in the eastern part of the community. Kauaʻi's main seaport is at Nāwiliwili Bay, directly southeast of town. Līhuʻe is also served by The Kauaʻi Bus, a public bus system serving the entire island.

== Facilities ==
The town is home to the county administration building; Kauaʻi's largest shopping center, Kukui Grove Center, which houses the island's only big department store and several big-box stores. There are also several car dealerships and restaurants.

== Education ==
Līhuʻe is home to Kauaʻi Community College, part of the University of Hawaiʻi system.

Līhuʻe is also served by the Hawaii Department of Education. Two Kindergarten-fifth grade elementary schools, Wilcox Elementary School in Līhuʻe and Kaumualii Elementary School in downtown Hanamaulu serve the area. All of the area is zoned to Kamakahelei Middle School and Kauai High School.

Island School, a private pre-kindergarten to 12 school, is also located in Līhuʻe.

The Hawaiʻi State Public Library System operates the Lihue Public Library.

== Notable people ==
- Bethany Hamilton (b. 1990) surfer
- Eric Shinseki, (b. 1942) retired United States Army general who served as 34th chief of staff of the Army and the seventh U.S. secretary of veterans affairs.
- Robert Yasuda (b. 1940) American abstract painter
- Kirby Yates (b. 1987) Major League Baseball pitcher
- Tyler Yates (b. 1977) former Major League Baseball pitcher
- Glenn Medeiros (b. 1970) singer, songwriter, educator.
