= 1984 United States presidential election in Hawaii =

- November 6, 1984

Nominee	Ronald Reagan	Walter Mondale
Party	Republican	Democratic
Home state	California	Minnesota
Running mate	George H. W. Bush	Geraldine Ferraro
Electoral vote	4	0
Popular vote	185,050	147,154
Percentage	55.10%	43.82%
County results
Reagan
50–60%
President before election
Ronald Reagan
Republican
Elected President
Ronald Reagan
Republican

The 1984 United States presidential election in Hawaii took place on November 6, 1984. All 50 states and the District of Columbia, were part of the 1984 United States presidential election. Hawaii voters chose 4 electors to the Electoral College, which selected the president and vice president of the United States. Hawaii was won by incumbent United States President Ronald Reagan of California, who was running against former Vice President Walter Mondale of Minnesota. Reagan ran for a second time with former C.I.A. Director George H. W. Bush of Texas, and Mondale ran with Representative Geraldine Ferraro of New York, the first major female candidate for the vice presidency.

Hawaii voted 7% more Democratic than the national average in this election. This election and that of 1972 are the only two presidential races where Hawaii voted Republican. This is also the last time the Democratic presidential nominee failed to win every county in Hawaii, and the last time Republicans carried any congressional district in the state. This was the third and final presidential race in which Oahu voted Republican.

Reagan won the election in Hawaii with a decisive 11-point win. The election results in Hawaii are reflective of a nationwide reconsolidation of the base for the Republican Party which took place through the 1980s; called by Reagan the "second American Revolution." This was most evident during the 1984 presidential election. No Republican candidate has received as strong of support in the American Pacific states at large, as Reagan did. Hawaii was one of five states Reagan lost in 1980 but won in 1984; the others were Georgia, West Virginia, Maryland and Rhode Island.

== Democratic caucus ==
Gary Hart and John Glenn, who were not on the ballot, told their supporters to vote uncommitted. Uncommitted won the caucus. On May 26, the state convention selected 13 uncommitted and 6 Mondale delegates.

== Results ==
1984 United States presidential election in Hawaii
Party	Candidate	Votes	Percentage	Electoral votes
Republican	Ronald Reagan (incumbent)	185,050	55.10%	4
Democratic	Walter Mondale	147,154	43.82%	0
Libertarian	David Bergland	2,167	0.65%	0
Communist Party	Gus Hall	821	0.24%	0
Independent	Lyndon LaRouche	654	0.19%	0
Totals		335,846	100.0%	4

=== Results by county ===
County	Ronald Reagan Republican		Walter Mondale Democratic		Various candidates Other parties		Margin		Total votes cast
County	#	%	#	%	#	%	#	%	Total votes cast
Hawaii	20,707	52.90%	17,866	45.64%	570	1.46%	2,841	7.26%	39,143
Honolulu	140,323	56.08%	107,444	42.94%	2,470	0.98%	32,879	13.14%	250,237
Kauaʻi	9,249	50.45%	8,862	48.34%	221	1.21%	387	2.11%	18,332
Maui	14,720	52.45%	12,966	46.20%	381	1.35%	1,754	6.25%	28,067
Totals	185,050	55.10%	147,154	43.82%	3,642	1.08%	37,896	11.28%	335,846

==== Counties that flipped from Democratic to Republican ====
- Hawaii
- Kauaʻi
- Maui

== See also ==
- Presidency of Ronald Reagan
