= Iroquois Point, Hawaii =

Census-designated place in Hawaii, United States

Iroquois Point
- Census-designated place
- Location in Honolulu County and the state of Hawaii
- Coordinates: 21°19′46″N 157°58′51″W
- Country: United States
- State: Hawaii

Area
  - Total: 1.14 sq mi (2.96 km^{2})
  - Land: 0.81 sq mi (2.11 km^{2})
  - Water: 0.33 sq mi (0.86 km^{2})
- Elevation: 11 ft (3.4 m)

Population (2020)
  - Total: 4,549
  - Density: 5,596.3/sq mi (2,160.76/km^{2})
- Time zone: UTC-10 (Hawaii-Aleutian)
- ZIP code: 96706
- Area code: 808
- FIPS code: 15-19100

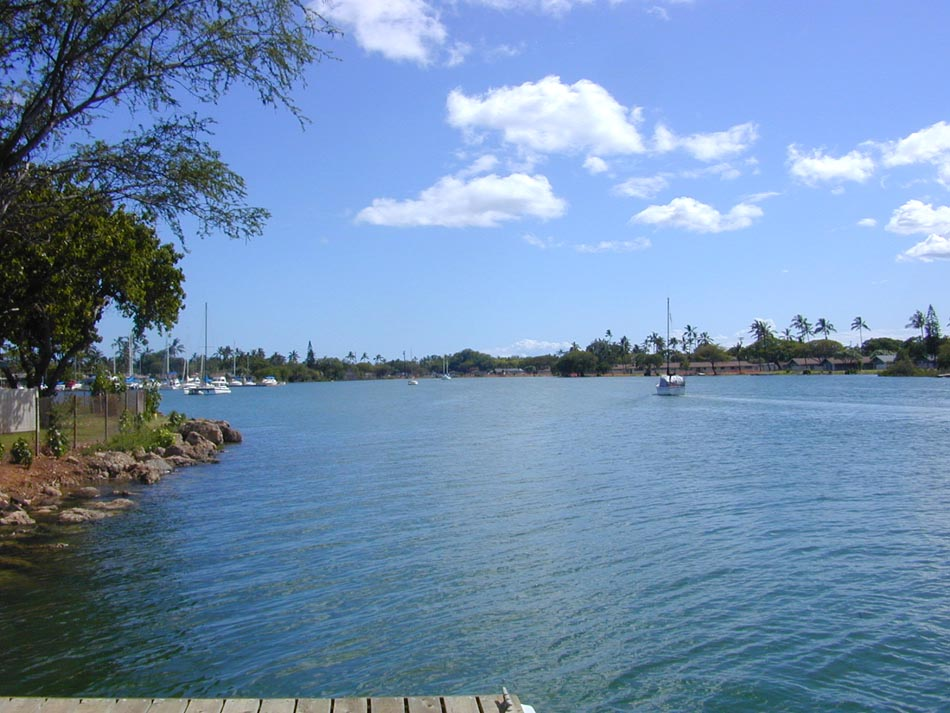
Puʻuloa Lagoon in the center of Iroquois Point Housing

Iroquois Point is a census-designated place (CDP) in Honolulu County, Hawaii, United States, on the island of Oahu near Pearl Harbor. The population was 4,549 at the 2020 census. "Iroquois Point" refers to the geographic land area that is occupied by the Kapilina Beach Homes (known as "Waterfront at Pu'uloa" until 2015 and "Iroquois Point Island Club" prior to 2008), a firing range, a Navy Exchange shoppette and gas station, and Iroquois Point Elementary School. Once primarily used as a military housing community, it is now privately operated.

== Geography ==
Iroquois Point is located at 21°19'46" north, 157°58'51" west (21.329350, -157.980963). It is reached from North Road in ʻEwa Beach by turning onto Iroquois Drive. Alternatively, Iroquois Point Road from Fort Weaver Road in ʻEwa to West Loch Drive, and West Loch Drive south connecting to the end of North Road just beyond Iroquois Drive.

According to the United States Census Bureau, the CDP has a total area of 0.6 square miles (1.6 km^{2}), of which 0.5 square miles (1.3 km^{2}) is land and 0.1 square miles (0.26 km^{2}) is water. The total area is 15.62% water.

== Demographics ==
Historical population
Census	Pop.	Note	%±
2020	4,549		—
U.S. Decennial Census

=== 2020 census ===
As of the 2020 census, Iroquois Point had a population of 4,549. The median age was 29.0 years. 30.7% of residents were under the age of 18 and 4.9% of residents were 65 years of age or older. For every 100 females there were 96.7 males, and for every 100 females age 18 and over there were 94.7 males age 18 and over.

99.1% of residents lived in urban areas, while 0.9% lived in rural areas.

There were 1,306 households in Iroquois Point, of which 52.0% had children under the age of 18 living in them. Of all households, 62.8% were married-couple households, 15.5% were households with a male householder and no spouse or partner present, and 15.5% were households with a female householder and no spouse or partner present. About 11.2% of all households were made up of individuals and 1.6% had someone living alone who was 65 years of age or older.

There were 1,467 housing units, of which 11.0% were vacant. The homeowner vacancy rate was 0.0% and the rental vacancy rate was 10.5%.

Racial composition as of the 2020 census
Race	Number	Percent
White	1,977	43.5%
Black or African American	334	7.3%
American Indian and Alaska Native	38	0.8%
Asian	410	9.0%
Native Hawaiian and Other Pacific Islander	492	10.8%
Some other race	166	3.6%
Two or more races	1,132	24.9%
Hispanic or Latino (of any race)	907	19.9%

=== 2000 census ===
As of the census of 2000, there were 2,462 people, 675 households, and 660 families residing in the CDP. The population density was 4,585.0 inhabitants per square mile (1,770.3/km^{2}). There were 1,035 housing units at an average density of 1,927.5 per square mile (744.2/km^{2}). The racial makeup of the CDP was 76.81% White, 5.56% African American, 1.06% Native American, 4.14% Asian, 0.89% Pacific Islander, 4.10% from other races, and 7.43% from two or more races. 7.88% of the population were Hispanic or Latino of any race.

There were 675 households, out of which 83.6% had children under the age of 18 living with them, 95.0% were married couples living together, 1.9% had a female householder with no husband present, and 2.2% were non-families. 1.9% of all households were made up of individuals, and 0.0% had someone living alone who was 65 years of age or older. The average household size was 3.65 and the average family size was 3.68.

In the CDP the population was spread out, with 44.5% under the age of 18, 4.8% from 18 to 24, 48.1% from 25 to 44, 2.6% from 45 to 64, and 0.1% who were 65 years of age or older. The median age was 26 years. For every 100 females, there were 105.2 males. For every 100 females age 18 and over, there were 100.1 males.

The median income for a household in the CDP was $44,200, and the median income for a family was $44,200. Males had a median income of $33,590 versus $26,458 for females. The per capita income for the CDP was $13,257. 1.8% of the population and 2.5% of families were below the poverty line. Out of the total population, 1.7% of those under the age of 18 and 0.0% of those 65 and older were living below the poverty line.

== History ==
The name of Iroquois Point was derived from the name USS Iroquois which was held by two U.S. Navy ships. Both ships had history that related to that spot at the entrance to Pearl Harbor. USS Iroquois, a steam sloop of war commissioned in 1850, was outfitted as a hospital ship to provide care to U.S. sailors aboard vessels anchored in Honolulu Harbor, and it is believed that the ship was anchored near the present Iroquois Point site. The second USS Iroquois, a commercial steam tug commissioned in 1898, was assigned to Commander F. Merry as part of his operations at Naval Station Honolulu.

During WWII the Seabees built a Seabee encampment of four 1000 man Construction Battalion areas at Iroquois Point with a chapel. They also built an Advance Base Reshipment Depot (ABRD) and an Advance Base Construction Depot (ABCD). Construction Battalion Maintenance Unit 523 was stationed at the ABRD.

Iroquois Point also had an annex to the Bishop point Section Station and Net Depot across the harbor channel. The annex had a barracks, officer's quarters and 600' of pier.

Starting in the summer of 2003 this U.S. Navy property was leased to Hunt Building Co. and Fluor Federal Services LLC—a joint venture now operating as Ford Island Properties—in exchange for in-kind construction and infrastructure repairs on Ford Island. This unprecedented arrangement was made possible through special legislation passed by Congress in 1999. The Navy gave the developers a 65-year lease of Iroquois Point/Puʻuloa, a 34-acre (14 ha) parcel on Ford Island, and the 6.6-acre (2.7 ha) Hālawa Landing—all underutilized Navy properties. The developers also were allowed to purchase 695 acres (2.81 km^{2}) of housing at Kalaeloa after three years and given outright ownership of the 515-acre (2.08 km^{2}) former Waikele Naval Magazine (Gordon, 2005).

Built in the 1960s, the homes on the north side of Puʻuloa Lagoon were empty when renovations began in August 2003, with more than 100 tradesmen working on a daily basis, moving block by block through the housing development. Something less than half of the 1,463 homes were upgraded with an initial investment of about $20 million. Beyond that, several million dollars is to be invested for amenities, such as a community center (Gordon, 2005). Iroquois Point housing lies directly under the glideslope of runway 8L of Honolulu International Airport. Neighborhood residents are often witness to large commercial and military jets that land at the airport flying low over the area.

== Education ==
Hawaii Department of Education operates public schools. Iroquois Point Elementary School is in the area though it is outside the CDP and has an Ewa Beach postal address.
