= Honolulu County, Hawaii =

County in Hawaii, United States

Coordinates: 21°28′N 157°58′W

Honolulu County
- Consolidated city-county
- City and County of Honolulu; Kūlanakauhale a me ke Kalana o Honolulu (Hawaiian)
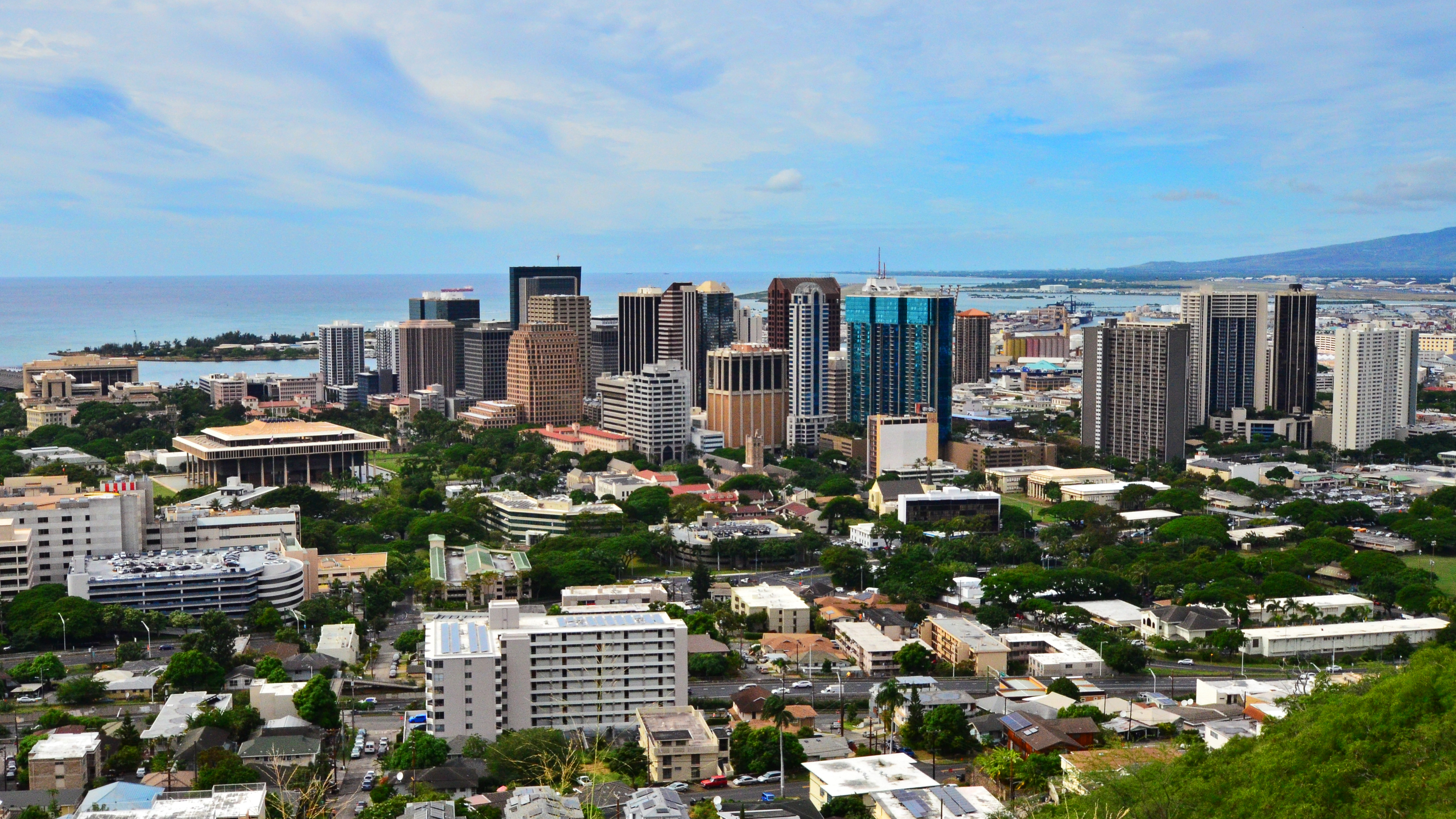
- Downtown Honolulu, the city and county urban center

- Flag Seal
- Motto(s): Haʻaheo No ʻO Honolulu (The Pride of Honolulu)
- Location in the state of Hawaii (Northwestern Hawaiian Islands not shown)
- Country: United States
- State: Hawaii
- Incorporated: April 30, 1907
- Seat: Honolulu

Government
  - Type: Mayor–council
  - Mayor: Rick Blangiardi (I)
  - Council: Members: 1. Andria Tupola (Floor Leader); 2. Heidi Tsuneyoshi; 3. Esther Kiaʻāina (Vice-Chair); 4. Tommy Waters (Chair); 5. Calvin Say; 6. Carol Fukunaga; 7. Radiant Cordero; 8. Brandon Elefante; 9. Augie Tulba

Area
  - Total: 2,128 sq mi (5,510 km^{2})
  - Land: 601 sq mi (1,560 km^{2})
  - Water: 1,527 sq mi (3,950 km^{2}) 71.8%

Population (2020)
  - Total: 1,016,508
  - Estimate (2025): 988,703 ▼
  - Density: 1,691/sq mi (653/km^{2})

GDP
  - MSA: $87.066 billion (2024)
- Time zone: UTC−10 (Hawaii–Aleutian)
- Area code: 808
- Website: honolulu.gov

Honolulu County (Hawaiian: Kalana ʻo Honolulu), officially known as the City and County of Honolulu and formerly as Oʻahu County, is a consolidated city-county in the U.S. state of Hawaii, one of five counties in the state. The city-county includes both Urban Honolulu (the state's capital and largest community) and the rest of the neighborhoods on the island of Oʻahu, as well as several minor outlying islands, including all of the Northwestern Hawaiian Islands (islands beyond Niʻihau) except Midway Atoll.

The consolidated city-county was established in the city charter adopted in 1907 and accepted by the Legislature of the Territory of Hawaii. As a municipal corporation and jurisdiction it manages aspects of government traditionally exercised by both municipalities and counties in the rest of the United States.

As of the 2020 United States census, the population was 1,016,508. The United States Census Bureau, in its statistics, treats Honolulu County as a municipal government instead of as a county government, unlike several of Hawaii's other counties. Because of Hawaii's municipal structure, the States Census Bureau puts several portions of Honolulu County into different census-designated places for statistical purposes.

The mayor of Honolulu County is Rick Blangiardi. The county motto is "Haʻaheo No ʻO Honolulu (Honolulu Pride)". About 70% of the state's population lives in Honolulu County. Only Nevada has a higher percentage of its population living in its most populous county. 43.0% of residents identify as Asian or Asian American, the highest of any U.S. county.

== Geography ==
According to the U.S. Census Bureau, the county has a total area of 2,128 square miles (5,510 km^{2}), of which 601 square miles (1,560 km^{2}) is land and 1,527 square miles (3,950 km^{2}) (71.8%) is water. However, the majority of this area is the Pacific Ocean that surrounds the islands. At over 1,380 miles (2,220 km) from end to end, it is by a significant margin the widest county in the United States.

=== Adjacent counties ===
- Maui County - southeast
- Kauaʻi County - northwest of population center

=== National protected areas ===
- James Campbell National Wildlife Refuge
- Oʻahu Forest National Wildlife Refuge
- Papahānaumokuākea Marine National Monument
- Pearl Harbor National Wildlife Refuge
- USS Arizona Memorial

== Demographics ==
Historical population
Census	Pop.	Note	%±
1900	58,504		—
1910	81,993		40.1%
1920	123,496		50.6%
1930	202,887		64.3%
1940	257,696		27.0%
1950	353,020		37.0%
1960	500,409		41.8%
1970	629,176		25.7%
1980	762,565		21.2%
1990	836,231		9.7%
2000	876,156		4.8%
2010	953,207		8.8%
2020	1,016,508		6.6%
2025 (est.)	988,703	▼	−2.7%
U.S. Decennial Census; 1790-1960 1900-1990; 1990-2000 2010-2020

=== 2020 census ===
Honolulu County, Hawaii – Racial and ethnic composition Note: the US Census treats Hispanic/Latino as an ethnic category. This table excludes Latinos from the racial categories and assigns them to a separate category. Hispanics/Latinos may be of any race.
Race / Ethnicity (NH = Non-Hispanic)	Pop 2000	Pop 2010	Pop 2020	% 2000	% 2010	% 2020
White alone (NH)	175,633	181,684	175,530	20.05%	19.06%	17.27%
Black or African American alone (NH)	19,583	17,929	19,356	2.24%	1.88%	1.90%
Native American or Alaska Native alone (NH)	1,574	1,699	1,116	0.18%	0.18%	0.11%
Asian alone (NH)	396,531	410,019	429,410	45.26%	43.01%	42.24%
Native Hawaiian or Pacific Islander alone (NH)	74,430	86,235	97,063	8.50%	9.05%	9.55%
Other race alone (NH)	1,533	1,287	3,174	0.17%	0.14%	0.31%
Mixed race or Multiracial (NH)	148,143	176,921	198,537	16.91%	18.56%	19.53%
Hispanic or Latino (any race)	58,729	77,433	92,322	6.70%	8.12%	9.08%
Total	876,156	953,207	1,016,508	100.00%	100.00%	100.00%

As of the 2020 census, the county had a population of 1,016,508. Of the residents, 20.3% were under the age of 18 and 18.7% were 65 years of age or older; the median age was 39.8 years. For every 100 females there were 100.5 males, and for every 100 females age 18 and over there were 99.3 males. 98.3% of residents lived in urban areas and 1.7% lived in rural areas.

The racial makeup of the county was 18.5% White, 2.0% Black or African American, 0.2% American Indian and Alaska Native, 43.0% Asian, 10.0% Native Hawaiian and Pacific Islander, 1.7% from some other race, and 24.5% from two or more races. Hispanic or Latino residents of any race comprised 9.1% of the population.

There were 336,412 households in the county, of which 31.8% had children under the age of 18 living with them and 24.9% had a female householder with no spouse or partner present. About 24.0% of all households were made up of individuals and 10.3% had someone living alone who was 65 years of age or older.

There were 370,665 housing units, of which 9.2% were vacant. Among occupied housing units, 56.3% were owner-occupied and 43.7% were renter-occupied. The homeowner vacancy rate was 1.2% and the rental vacancy rate was 7.1%.

=== 2010 census ===
As of the census of 2010, there were 953,207 people, 311,047 households, and 217,842 families residing in Honolulu County. The population density was 1,461 inhabitants per square mile (564/km^{2}). There were 315,988 housing units at an average density of 527 per square mile (203/km^{2}). The racial makeup of the county was 43.9% Asian, 20.8% white, 9.5% Pacific Islander, 2.0% black or African American, 0.3% Native American, 1.1% from other races, and 22.3% from two or more races. Hispanic or Latino residents of any race were 9.1% of the population. The largest ancestry groups were:

- 15.7% Japanese
- 14.9% Filipino
- 5.9% German
- 5.4% Chinese
- 5.0% Native Hawaiian
- 4.4% Irish
- 3.8% English
- 3.1% Portuguese
- 2.9% Puerto Rican
- 2.3% Korean
- 2.3% Mexican
- 1.8% Samoan
- 1.8% Italian
- 1.8% Spanish
- 1.4% French

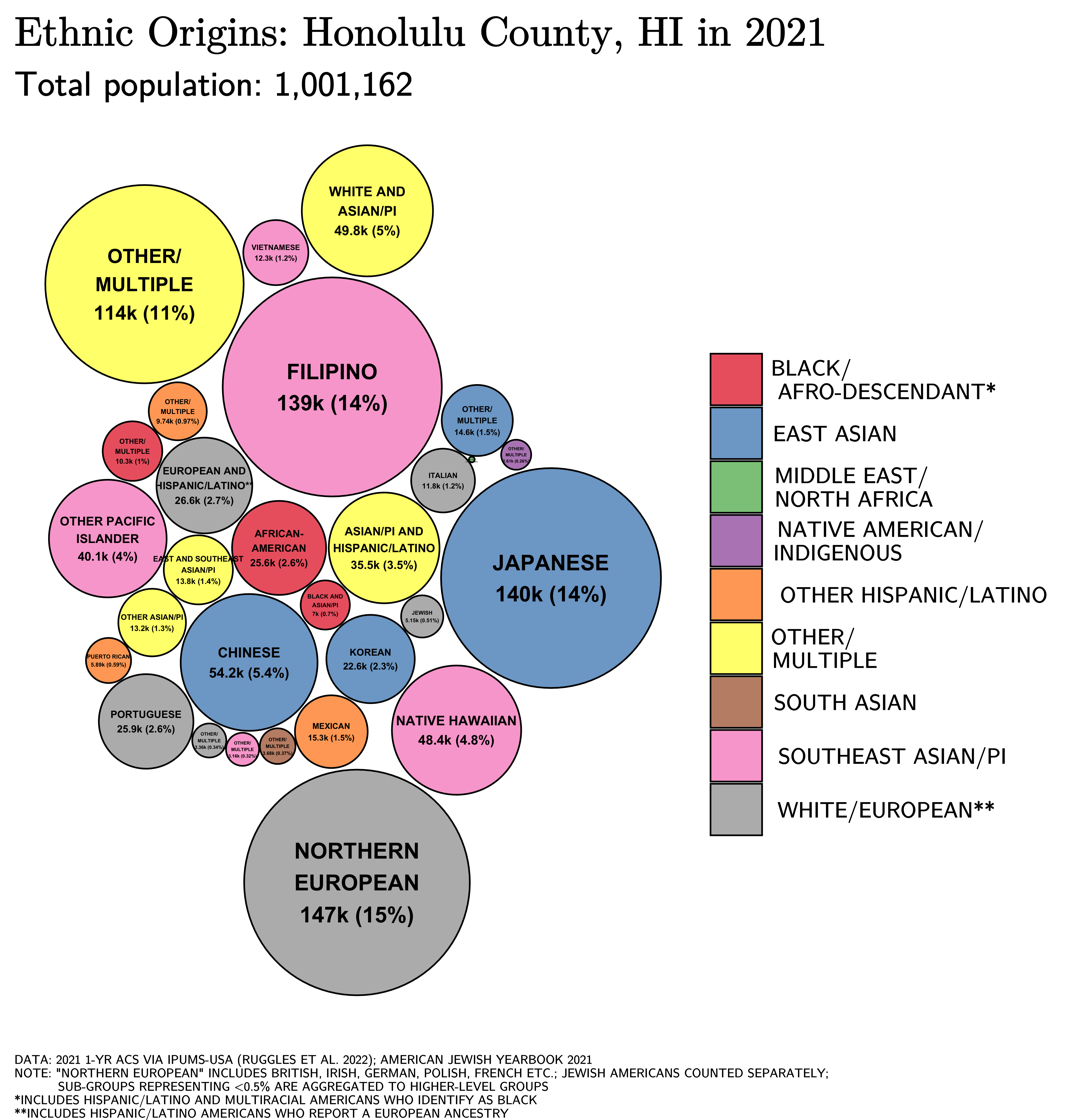
Ethnic origins in Honolulu County

In the census of 2000, there were 286,450 households, out of which 31.8% had children under the age of 18 living with them, 54.5% were married couples living together, 12.3% had a female householder with no husband present, and 28.2% were non-families. 21.6% of all households were made up of individuals, and 7.0% had someone living alone who was 65 years of age or older. The average household size was 2.95 and the average family size was 3.46.

In the county, 23.80% of the population was under the age of 18, 10.1% was from 18 to 24, 30.6% from 25 to 44, 22.0% from 45 to 64, and 13.4% was 65 years of age or older. The median age was 36 years. For every 100 females, there were 101.1 males. For every 100 females age 18 and over, there were 99.7 males.

=== Metropolitan Statistical Area ===
The United States Office of Management and Budget has designated Honolulu County as the Urban Honolulu, HI Metropolitan Statistical Area. The United States Census Bureau ranked the Urban Honolulu, HI Metropolitan Statistical Area as the 54th most populous metropolitan statistical area and the 61st most populous primary statistical area of the United States as of July 1, 2012.

== Economy ==
=== Top employers ===
According to the county's 2022 Annual Comprehensive Financial Report, the top employers in the county are the following:

#	Employer	# of Employees
1	State of Hawaii	66,900
2	United States Government	34,700
3	City and County of Honolulu	18,600
4	The Queen's Health Systems	8,426
5	Hawaii Pacific Health	7,119
6	Kaiser Foundation Health Plan	4,382
7	Hawaiian Electric Industries Inc.	3,649
8	Kamehameha Schools	3,357
9	Oahu Transit Services Inc.	2,063
10	First Hawaiian Bank	1,858

Other major companies headquartered in Honolulu CDP include Hawaiian Airlines, Aloha Air Cargo, and Bank of Hawaii.

== Government ==
United States Senate election results for Honolulu County, Hawaii1
Year	Republican		Democratic		Third party(ies)	
Year	No.	%	No.	%	No.	%
2024	111,603	33.58%	209,780	63.12%	10,953	3.30%
2018	79,503	31.03%	176,705	68.97%	0	0.00%
2012	119,176	40.56%	174,634	59.44%	0	0.00%

United States Senate election results for Honolulu County, Hawaii3
Year	Republican		Democratic		Third party(ies)	
Year	No.	%	No.	%	No.	%
2022	74,265	27.40%	190,178	70.18%	6,548	2.42%
2016	64,939	23.30%	203,372	72.98%	10,345	3.71%
2014	71,487	29.81%	163,411	68.15%	4,889	2.04%
2010	57,502	22.50%	189,673	74.23%	8,355	3.27%

=== Local government ===
Honolulu County is administered under a mayor–council system of governance overseeing municipal services: civil defense, emergency medical, fire, parks and recreation, police, sanitation, transportation, and water, among others. For 2013, the county has an annual operating budget of US$2.16 billion.

The government of Honolulu County has three major divisions of municipal power:

- The mayor of Honolulu is the principal executor of administrative authority. The mayor is elected on a non-partisan basis to a four-year term.
- The Honolulu City Council is the unicameral legislative body. Its elected members are responsible for drafting and passing laws, as well as budgets for various departments. The council is independent of the mayor. The nine council members each represent an administrative district (listed below) and are elected on a non-partisan basis to staggered four-year terms.
- The Prosecuting Attorney of Honolulu is charged with prosecuting criminal offenses committed within the county. The prosecuting attorney is elected on a non-partisan basis to a four-year term. The office is not charged with providing legal counsel to the other branches; that duty is a responsibility of the Department of Corporation Counsel, under mayoral jurisdiction.

Honolulu County is divided into 36 neighborhood boards. The office of neighborhood board member is an advisory position for public policy and civil investment. Members are elected to two-year terms.

The U.S. Census Bureau lists this government as a municipal government and not as a county government.

==== County districts ====
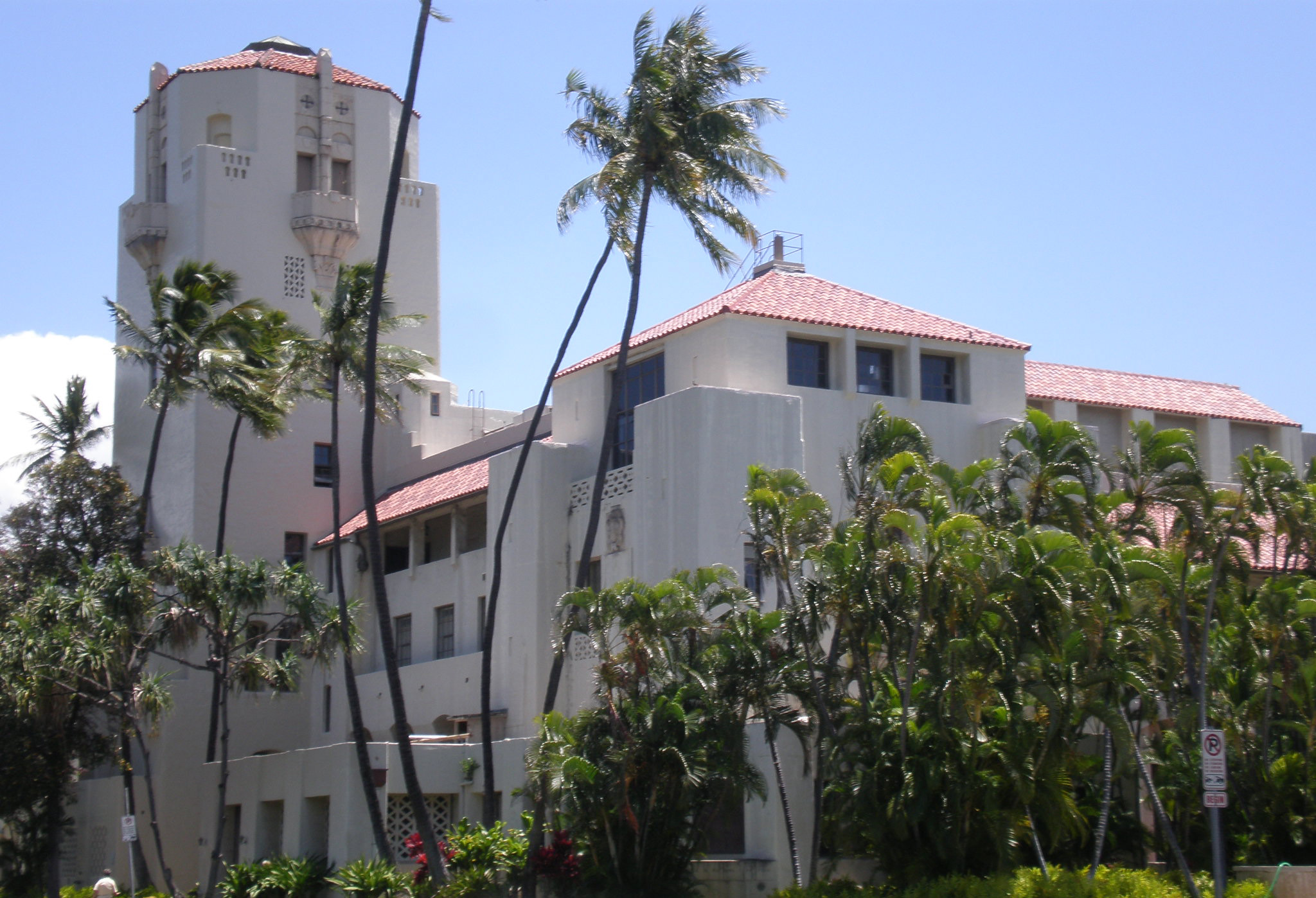
Honolulu Hale is the county seat, home of the County mayor and council.

Honolulu County has nine districts, each of which elects a member of the city-county council. The boundaries of each district are revised every ten years in conjunction with the U.S. census.

- District I: Portions of ʻEwa Beach, Kapolei, Ho‘opili, Makakilo, Kalaeloa, Honokai Hale, Ko ‘Olina, Nānākuli, Mā‘ili, Wai‘anae, Mākaha, Kea‘au, and Mākua
- District II: Waikele, Village Park, Royal Kunia, Wahiawā, Mokulē‘ia, Waialua, Hale‘iwa, Pūpūkea, Sunset Beach, Kahuku, Lā‘ie, Hau‘ula, Punalu‘u, Kahana, Ka‘a‘awa, Kualoa, Waiāhole, and Kahalu‘u
- District III: ‘Āhuimanu, He‘eia, Ha‘ikū, Kāne‘ohe, Maunawili, Kailua, Olomana, Enchanted Lake, and Waimānalo
- District IV: Hawai‘i Kai, Kuli‘ou‘ou, Niu Valley, ‘Āina Haina, Wailupe, Wai‘alae Iki, Kalani Valley, Kāhala, Wilhemina Rise, Kaimukī, Kapahulu, Diamond Head, and Waikīkī
- District V: Palolo Valley, St. Louis Heights, Mānoa, Mōʻiliʻili, McCully, Ala Moana, Makiki, and portions of Kakaʻako
- District VI: Portions of Kakaʻako, Downtown Honolulu, Punchbowl, Papakolea, Pauoa Valley, Nu‘uanu, Iwilei, Liliha, ‘Ālewa Heights, Kalihi and Kalihi Valley
- District VII: Kalihi Kai, Māpunapuna, Fort Shafter, Moanalua, Salt Lake, Airport, Hickam, Āliamanu, Foster Village, Pearl Harbor, Hālawa, ‘Aiea, Pearlridge, Mokuʻumeʻume, and Sand Island
- District VIII: Portions of ‘Aiea, Waimalu, Newtown, Pearl City, Seaview, Crestview, Waipi‘o Gentry, Koa Ridge, Mililani Town, and Mililani Mauka
- District IX: Waipahū, Iroquois Point, West Loch, ʻEwa Villages and portions of ʻEwa Beach

==== Civic center ====
The civic center is coextensive with what is known as the Capitol District in downtown Honolulu. The official seat of governance for the Honolulu County is located within the district at Honolulu Hale, established in the 1920s as a city hall structure and houses the chambers of the mayor of Honolulu and the Honolulu City Council. In the 1960s and 1970s, Mayor Frank Fasi developed the modern civic center as it is known today. He took controversial and aggressive measures to reclaim property, demolish massive concrete structures in the area, construct underground parking facilities and open a green campus above ground with manicured lawns and specially commissioned sculpted artwork. He also oversaw the construction of new government buildings, to house the departments that fell within mayoral jurisdiction. The most prominent of those new buildings were the Honolulu Municipal Building and Hale Makaʻi, the headquarters of the Honolulu Police Department. Civic centers were also constructed off the Capitol District campus, including the Kapiʻolani Bandstand, Neal S. Blaisdell Center, and the Waikīkī Shell.

==== Municipal services ====
The Honolulu County collects various forms of taxes, including a property tax. Revenue from those taxes is used to provide several services for the residents.

Services include:

- Honolulu Board of Water Supply
- Honolulu Fire Department
- Honolulu Emergency Medical Services
- TheBus
- Honolulu Police Department
- The Liquor Commission regulates intoxicating liquors.

=== Services ===
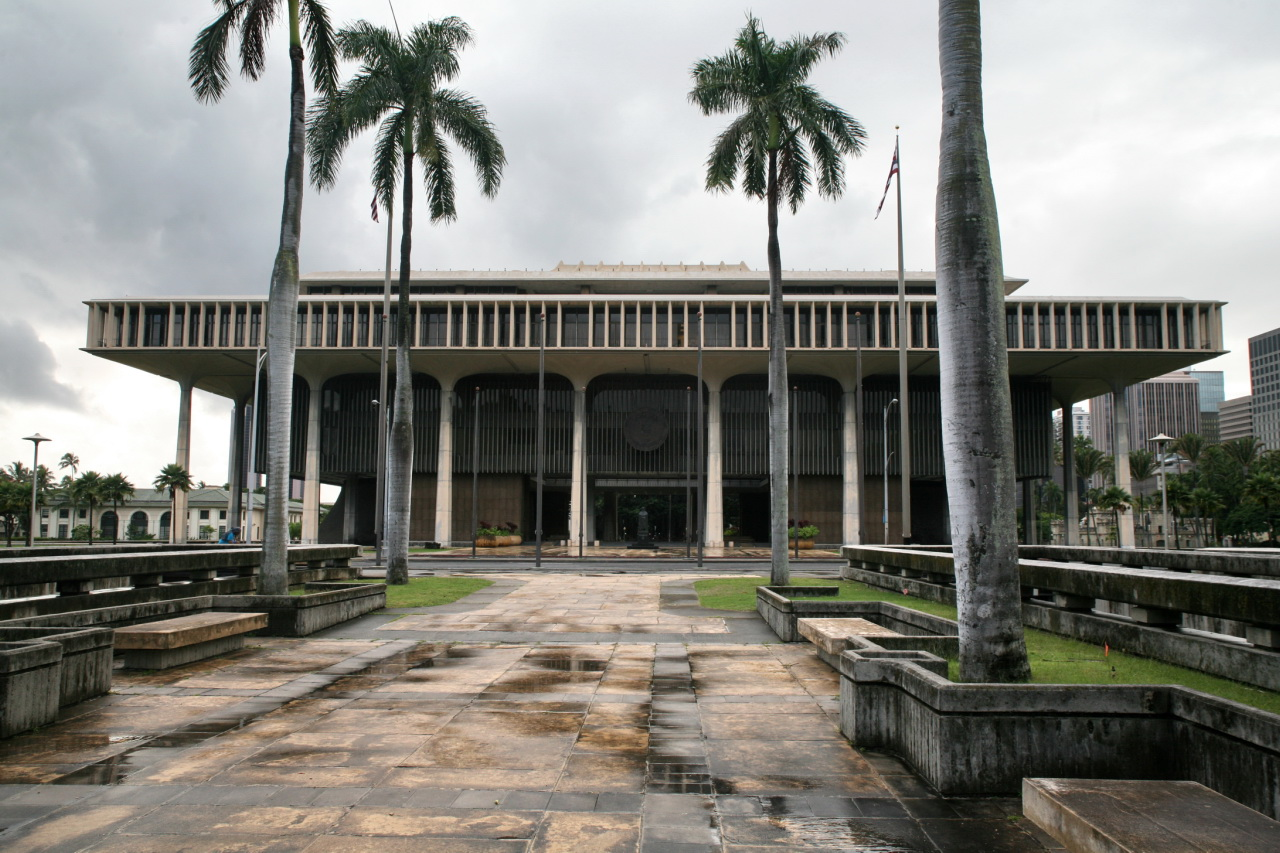
The Capitol of the State of Hawaiʻi

The Hawaii Department of Corrections and Rehabilitation operates three prisons, including the Halawa Correctional Facility, the Waiawa Correctional Facility, and the Women's Community Correctional Center, on the island of Oʻahu in the City and County of Honolulu. In addition the Oʻahu Community Correctional Center, the jail on Oʻahu, is in the county.

The United States Postal Service operates post offices in Honolulu County. The main one is located by the Honolulu International Airport at 3600 Aolele Street. Federal Detention Center, Honolulu, operated by the Federal Bureau of Prisons, is in the CDP. The Federal Bureau of Investigation (FBI) Honolulu field office is in Kapolei. The Kunia Regional SIGINT Operations Center of the National Security Agency (NSA) and the Wheeler Army Airfield are in Honolulu County.

Gubernatorial election results for Honolulu County, Hawaii
Year	Republican		Democratic		Third party(ies)	
Year	No.	%	No.	%	No.	%
2022	102,968	37.64%	170,575	62.36%	0	0.00%
2018	90,929	35.23%	158,623	61.46%	8,528	3.30%
2014	100,279	40.44%	119,312	48.12%	28,381	11.45%
2010	112,527	42.53%	150,554	56.90%	1,492	0.56%

=== Politics ===
United States presidential election results for Honolulu County, Hawaii
Year	Republican		Democratic		Third party(ies)	
Year	No.	%	No.	%	No.	%
1960	65,541	48.75%	68,915	51.25%	0	0.00%
1964	33,536	21.58%	121,859	78.42%	0	0.00%
1968	71,259	39.11%	108,141	59.35%	2,794	1.53%
1972	132,844	63.32%	76,957	36.68%	0	0.00%
1976	108,041	48.56%	111,389	50.07%	3,046	1.37%
1980	99,596	44.27%	96,472	42.88%	28,927	12.86%
1984	140,323	56.08%	107,444	42.94%	2,470	0.99%
1988	120,258	45.97%	138,971	53.13%	2,348	0.90%
1992	103,937	39.10%	123,908	46.61%	37,996	14.29%
1996	85,779	33.61%	143,793	56.33%	25,684	10.06%
2000	101,310	39.58%	139,618	54.54%	15,062	5.88%
2004	144,157	48.29%	152,500	51.08%	1,890	0.63%
2008	88,164	28.74%	214,239	69.83%	4,410	1.44%
2012	88,461	29.81%	204,349	68.86%	3,932	1.33%
2016	90,326	31.61%	175,696	61.48%	19,768	6.92%
2020	136,259	35.66%	238,869	62.51%	6,986	1.83%
2024	130,489	38.28%	204,301	59.93%	6,131	1.80%

Honolulu County, like the rest of Hawaii, is a stronghold of the Democratic Party. Despite this, it has tended to be the most Republican-leaning county in the state, with the exception of the 2024 election, when Kauaʻi County claimed this distinction. The urban center of Honolulu itself, and the whole southeastern portion of Oahu, including Kaneohe and Kailua, is where most of the Democratic strength in the county lies. Republican majorities can be found around the southwest and western shores, and also the far north shore.

== Diplomatic missions ==
Several countries have diplomatic missions in Honolulu:

- Australia (Consulate General)
- Federated States of Micronesia (Consulate General)
- Japan (Consulate General)
- Marshall Islands (Consulate General)
- New Zealand (Consulate General)
- Philippines (Consulate General)
- South Korea (Consulate General)
- Taiwan (Economic and Cultural Office)

== Transportation ==
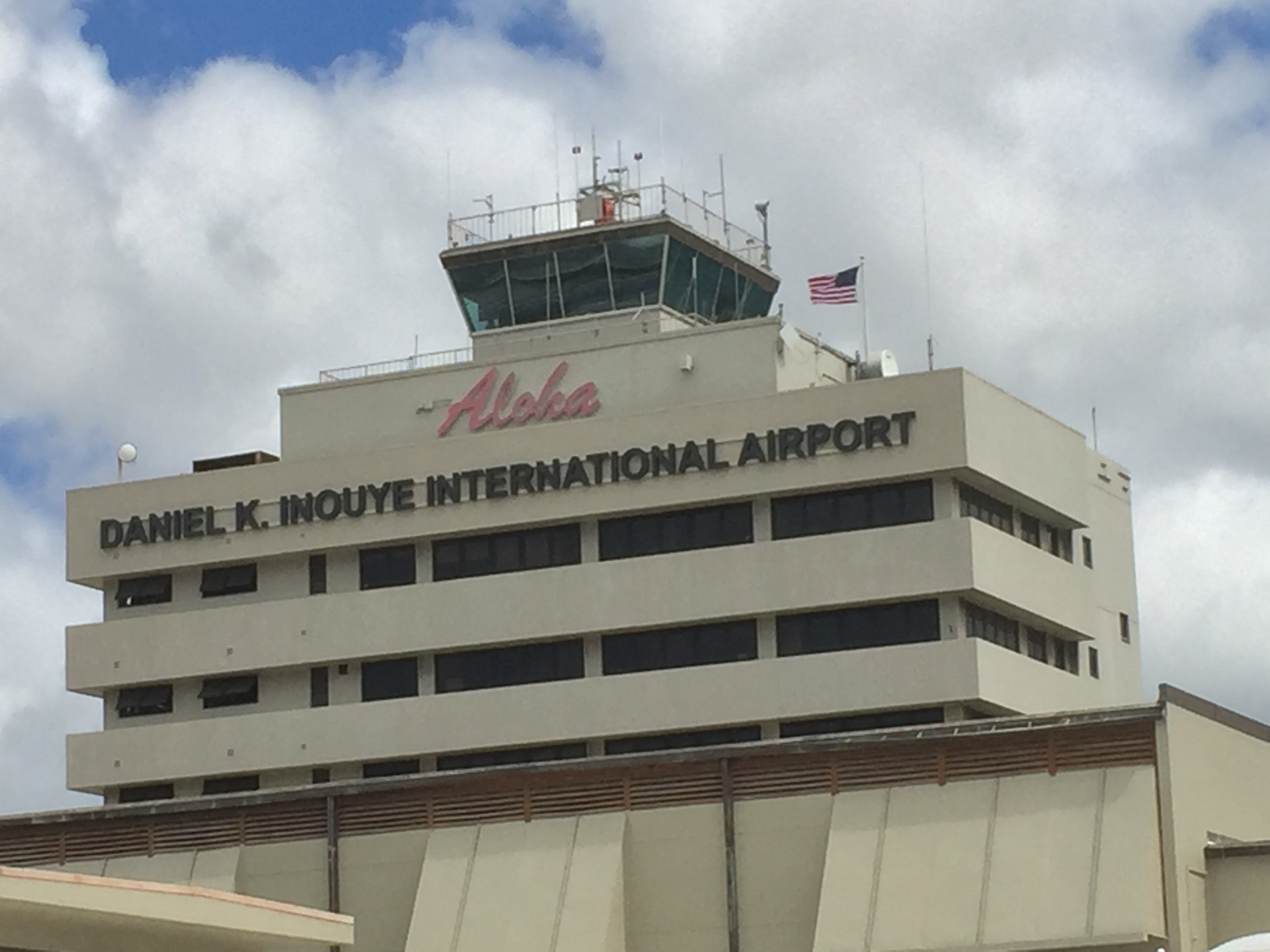
Honolulu International Airport

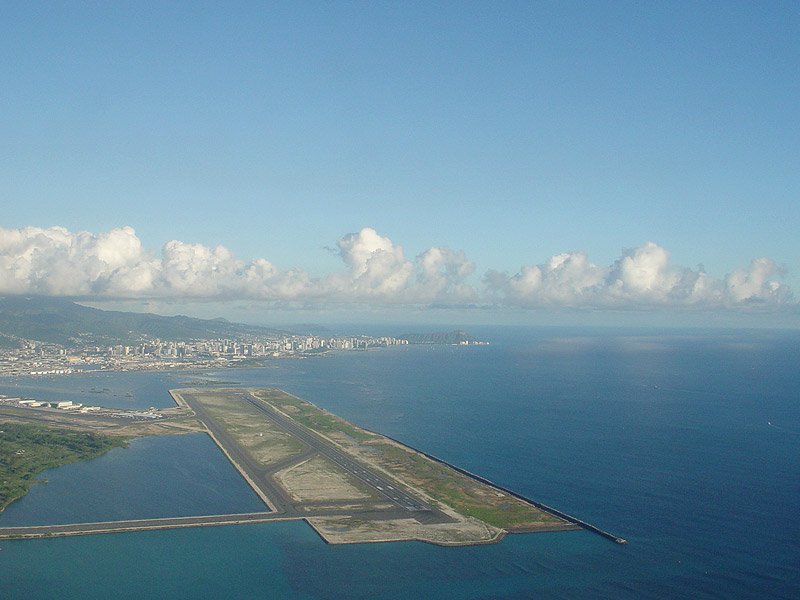
HNL "reef runway" (8R/26L)

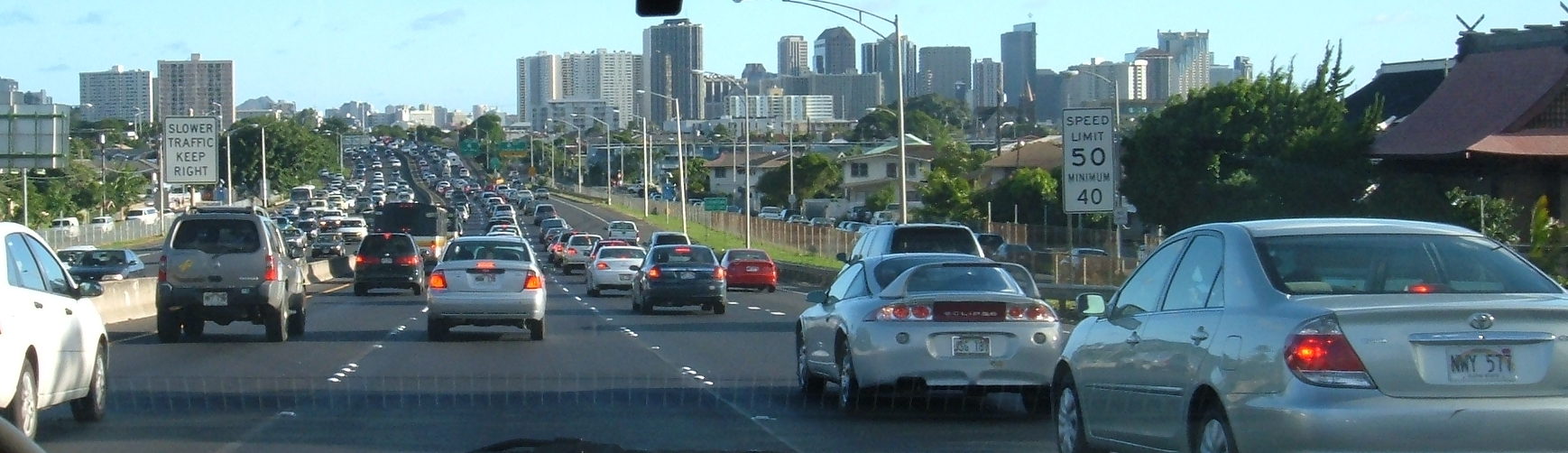
Interstate H-1 eastbound into the urban Downtown Honolulu

=== Air ===
Located on the western end of the Honolulu census-designated place, Honolulu International Airport (HNL) is the principal aviation gateway to the state of Hawaii. Numerous airlines fly Pacific-wide to and from Honolulu International Airport. Locally based Hawaiian Airlines also operates flights to destinations within the islands of Hawaii and to major destinations across the Pacific.

=== Major highways ===
- H-1
- H-2
- H-3
- H-201
- Route 61
- Route 63
- Route 65
- Route 72
- Route 80
- Route 83
- Route 93
- Route 95
- Route 99
- Route 750
- Route 801
- Route 803
- Route 830
- Route 930

=== Public transportation ===
The City and County of Honolulu's Department of Transportation Services oversees two public transportation services, each operated under contract. The fare system is shared between both services and can be paid using the HOLO card.

==== Bus ====
TheBus is the transit bus service of the city and county of Honolulu. The system consists of 106 routes, including three express routes and two limited-stop routes.

In 2025, TheBus had a ridership of 43,655,700, or about 142,900 per weekday as of the second quarter of 2026. As of December 2017, TheBus is the nation's most heavily used public transportation system per capita among major cities. The system is operated in contract with the nonprofit Oahu Transit Services Inc.

==== Rail ====
Skyline is a light metro line in the city and county of Honolulu. The first 10.8-mile (17.4 km) phase of the line between East Kapolei (on the ʻEwa Plain) and Aloha Stadium, opened on June 30, 2023. The second phase, connecting to Pearl Harbor and Daniel K. Inouye International Airport before reaching Middle Street, is anticipated to open in the summer of 2025. The final phase, continuing the line across urban Honolulu to Downtown, is due to open in 2031.

Skyline was planned, designed, and constructed by the Honolulu Authority for Rapid Transportation (HART), a semi-autonomous agency of the city-county government. The line is operated in contract with Hitachi Rail, who also built the railcars used on the service.

== Education ==
=== Colleges and universities ===
Public institutions in Honolulu County are operated by the University of Hawaiʻi System, which consists of University of Hawaiʻi at Mānoa, Honolulu Community College and Kapiʻolani Community College in the Honolulu CDP; Leeward Community College in Pearl City; University of Hawaiʻi at West Oʻahu in Kapolei; and Windward Community College in Kaneohe. The University of Hawaiʻi at Mānoa houses the system's main offices.

Private institutions serving the county include Chaminade University and Hawaii Pacific University in the Honolulu CDP and Brigham Young University–Hawaii in Laie CDP.

=== Primary and secondary schools ===
The Hawaii Department of Education operates public schools and charter schools in Honolulu County.

==== Private schools ====
Honolulu County has one of the highest rates of private school enrollment in the United States. Private schools in Honolulu County include Kamehameha Schools–Kapālama, Punahou School, ʻIolani School, Mid-Pacific Institute, Le Jardin Academy, and Island Pacific Academy. Private religiously affiliated schools include Maryknoll School, St. Louis School, Hawaii Baptist Academy, Hanalani Schools, Damien Memorial School, Sacred Hearts Academy, and Pacific Buddhist Academy.

=== Public libraries ===
The Hawaii State Public Library System operates public libraries. The Hawaii State Library in the Honolulu CDP serves as the main library of the system, while the Library for the Blind and Print Disabled, also in the CDP, serves disabled and blind people. The system operates 22 branch libraries throughout the county.

== Arts and culture ==
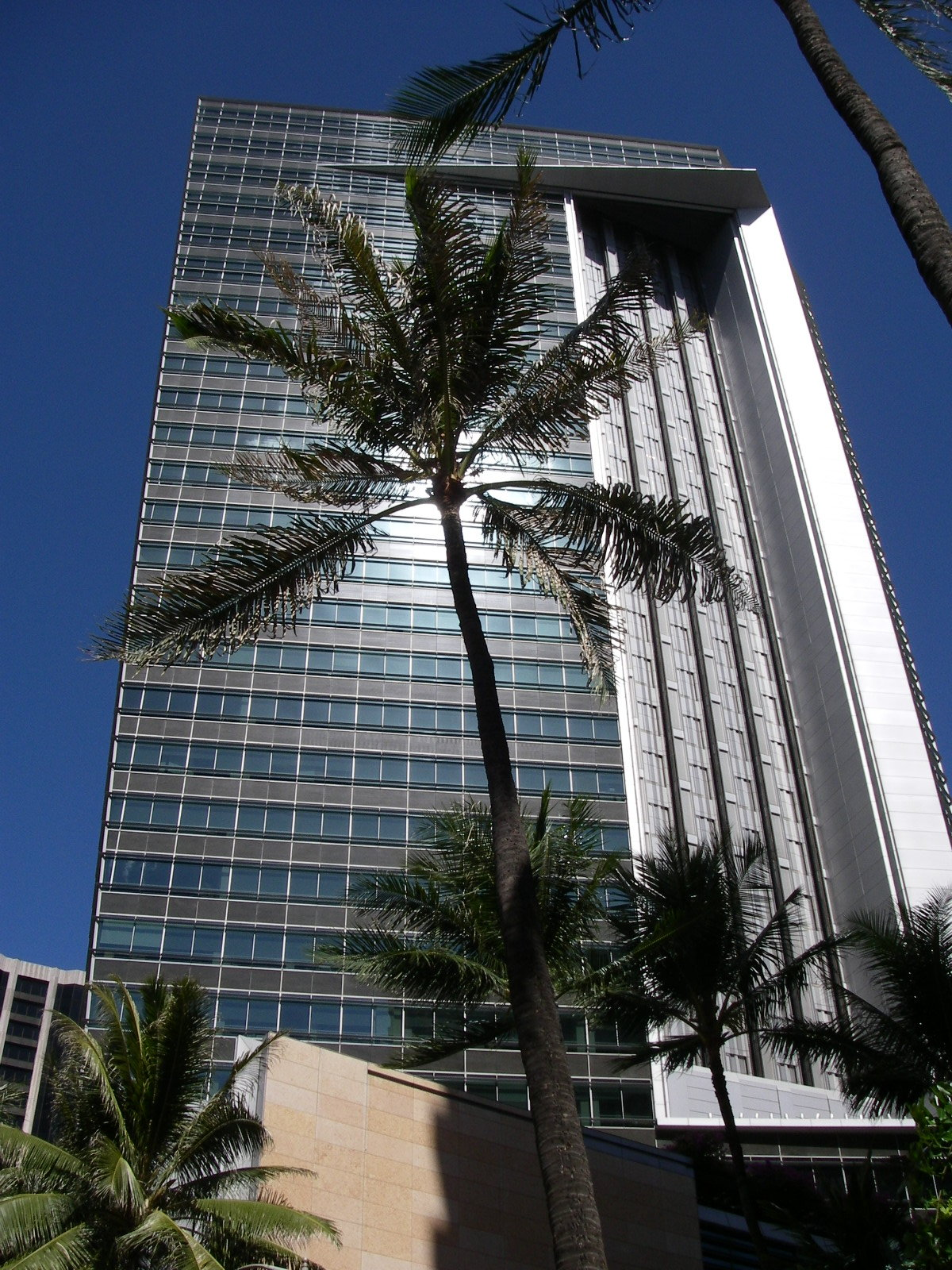
With symbolic native-styled architectural features, the First Hawaiian Center is the tallest building in Hawaii and home to a Honolulu Museum of Art Spalding House gallery.

=== Performing arts ===
Established in 1900, the Hawaii Symphony Orchestra is the oldest US symphony orchestra west of the Rocky Mountains. The Royal Hawaiian Band is even older, established in 1836 by King Kamehameha III and holds the distinction of being the only full-time municipal band in the United States, as well as the only one with a royal legacy. Other ensembles include the Hawaii Opera Theatre. Honolulu is also a center for Hawaiian music. The main music venues include the Neal Blaisdell Center Concert Hall, the Waikiki Shell, and the Hawaii Theatre.

Honolulu also includes several venues for live theater, including Diamond Head Theatre.

=== Visual arts ===
There are various institutions supported by the state and private entities for the advancement of the visual arts. The Honolulu Museum of Art is endowed with the largest collection of Asian and Western art in Hawaii. It also has the largest collection of Islamic art, housed at the Shangri La estate. Since the merger of the Honolulu Academy of Arts and The Contemporary Museum, Honolulu (now called the Honolulu Museum of Art Spalding House) in 2011, the museum is also the only contemporary art museum in the state. The contemporary collections are housed at main campus (Spalding House) in Makiki and a multi-level gallery in downtown Honolulu at the First Hawaiian Center. The museum hosts a film and video program dedicated to arthouse and world cinema in the museum's Doris Duke Theatre, named for the academy's historic patroness Doris Duke.

The Capitol Modern Museum is located in downtown Honolulu in No. 1 Capitol District Building and has a collection of art pieces created by local artists as well as traditional Hawaiian art. The museum is administered by the Hawaii State Foundation on Culture and the Arts.

=== Natural museums ===
Recognized internationally as the premier cultural institution of Hawaii, the Bishop Museum is the largest of Honolulu's museums. It is endowed with the state's largest collection of natural history specimens and the world's largest collection of Hawaiiana and Pacific culture artifacts. The Honolulu Zoo is the main zoological institution in Hawaii while the Waikiki Aquarium is a working marine biology laboratory. The Waikiki Aquarium is partnered with the University of Hawaiʻi and other universities worldwide. Established for appreciation of botany, Honolulu is home to several gardens: Foster Botanical Garden, Liliuokalani Botanical Garden, Walker Estate, among others.

== Sports ==
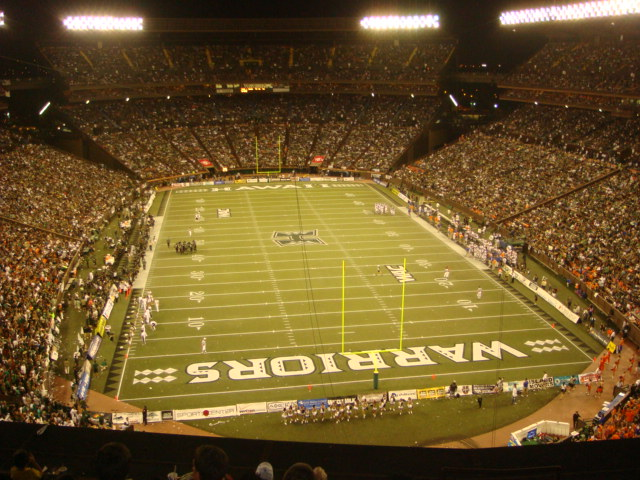
Aloha Stadium

Currently, Honolulu has no professional sports teams. Honolulu's Aloha Stadium was a long time host of the NFL's annual Pro Bowl from 1980 to 2016. The NCAA's Hawaii Bowl is played at Aloha Stadium annually. Games are hosted at Les Murakami and Hans L'Orange Park. Fans of spectator sports in Honolulu generally support the football, volleyball, basketball, and baseball programs of the University of Hawaiʻi at Mānoa. High school sporting events, especially football, are especially popular. Venues for spectator sports in Honolulu include:

- Aloha Stadium (American football and soccer)
- Les Murakami Stadium at the University of Hawaiʻi at Mānoa (baseball)
- Stan Sheriff Center at the University of Hawaiʻi at Mānoa (basketball and volleyball)
- Neal Blaisdell Center Arena (basketball)

Honolulu's mild climate lends itself to year-round fitness activities as well. In 2004, Men's Fitness magazine named Honolulu the fittest city in the nation. Honolulu is home to three large road races:

- The Great Aloha Run is held annually on Presidents' Day.
- The Honolulu Marathon, held annually on the second Sunday in December, draws more than 20,000 participants each year, about half to two thirds of them from Japan.
- The Honolulu Triathlon is an Olympic distance triathlon event governed by USA Triathlon. Held annually in May since 2004, there is an absence of a sprint course.

== Media ==
Honolulu County is home to numerous forms media including newspapers, magazines, radio and television.

== Communities ==
=== Census-designated places ===
- ʻĀhuimanu
- ʻAiea
- East Honolulu
- East Kapolei
- ʻEwa Beach
- ʻEwa Gentry
- ʻEwa Villages
- Hālawa
- Haleʻiwa
- Hauʻula
- Helemano
- Heʻeia
- Hickam Housing
- Honolulu
- Iroquois Point
- Kaʻaʻawa
- Kahaluʻu
- Kahuku
- Kailua
- Kalaeloa
- Kāneʻohe
- Kāneʻohe Base (Marine Corps Base Hawaii)
- Kapolei
- Kawela Bay
- Ko Olina
- Lāʻie
- Māʻili
- Mākaha
- Mākaha Valley
- Makakilo
- Maunawili
- Mililani Mauka
- Mililani Town
- Mokulēʻia
- Nānākuli
- Ocean Pointe
- Pearl City
- Punaluʻu
- Pūpūkea
- Royal Kunia (formerly Village Park)
- Schofield Barracks
- Wahiawā
- Waiāhole
- Waialua
- Waiʻanae
- Waikāne
- Waikele
- Waimalu
- Waimānalo
- Waimānalo Beach
- Waipahu
- Waipiʻo
- Waipiʻo Acres
- West Loch Estate
- Wheeler Army Airfield
- Whitmore Village

=== Other places ===
- ʻĀina Haina
- Hawaiʻi Kai
- Pauoa

== Sister cities ==
Honolulu's sister cities are:

- Avarua, Cook Islands, 2024
- Baguio, Philippines, 1991
- Baku, Azerbaijan 1998
- Bangkok, Thailand, 2025
- Bruyères, France, 1960
- Cali, Colombia, 2012
- Candon, Philippines, 2015
- Caracas, Venezuela, 1990
- Cebu City, Philippines, 1990
- Chengdu, China, 2011
- Chigasaki, Japan, 2014
- Edogawa (Tokyo), Japan, 2022
- Fengxian (Shanghai), China, 2012
- Funchal, Portugal, 1979
- Fuzhou, China, 2021
- Haikou, China, 1985
- Havana, Cuba, 2002
- Hegyvidék, Hungary, 2025
- Hiroshima, Japan, 1959
- Huế, Vietnam, 1995
- Incheon, South Korea, 2003
- Kaohsiung, Taiwan, 1962
- Kyzyl, Russia, 2004
- Laoag, Philippines, 1969
- Majuro, Marshall Islands, 2001
- Mandaluyong, Philippines, 2005
- Manila, Philippines, 1980
- Mombasa, Kenya, 2000
- Mumbai, India, 1970
- Nagaoka, Japan, 2012
- Naha, Japan, 1960
- Noreña, Spain, 1960
- Qinhuangdao, China, 2010
- Rabat, Morocco, 2007
- Saiki, Japan, 2003
- San Juan, Puerto Rico, 1985
- Seoul, South Korea, 1976
- Shibuya, Japan, 2024
- Shonai, Japan, 2025
- Sintra, Portugal, 1998
- Uwajima, Japan, 2004
- Vigan, Philippines, 2003
- Zhangzhou, China, 2012
- Zhongshan, China, 1997

== See also ==
- Patsy T. Mink Central Oʻahu Regional Park
- National Register of Historic Places listings in Oʻahu
