= Ocean Pointe, Hawaii =

Census-designated place in the United States

Ocean Pointe
- Census-designated place
- Approximate location in Honolulu County and the state of Hawaiʻi; this CDP is immediately west of the one highlighted
- Coordinates: 21°18′38″N 158°2′11″W
- Country: United States
- State: Hawaiʻi

Area
  - Total: 2.14 sq mi (5.54 km^{2})
  - Land: 2.02 sq mi (5.24 km^{2})
  - Water: 0.11 sq mi (0.29 km^{2})
- Elevation: 16 ft (5 m)

Population (2020)
  - Total: 14,965
  - Density: 7,394.2/sq mi (2,854.92/km^{2})
- Time zone: UTC−10 (Hawaii–Aleutian)
- ZIP code: 96706
- Area code: 808
- FIPS code: 15-56685
- GNIS feature ID: 2583427
- Website: www.oprca.com

Ocean Pointe is a housing development and a census-designated place (CDP) located in the ʻEwa District and the City & County of Honolulu on the leeward side of Oʻahu in Hawaiʻi about fifteen miles (24 km) from Honolulu. As of the 2020 census, Ocean Pointe had a population of 14,965. This general area was previously known just as ʻEwa. In the late 19th century to early 20th century, ʻEwa was one of the large population centers on the Island of Oʻahu, with industry focused around sugar cane production. The ʻEwa Mill was a major employer that set up residential villages. Sugar cane is no longer grown on the ʻEwa Plain and Ocean Pointe is now part of Oʻahu's new suburban growth center—an area of substantial sprawl spreading unbroken to the south to ʻEwa Beach, north to Honouliuli, and west to Kalaeloa and Kapolei. This area is now referred to as Oʻahu's Second City, with a city center (downtown) located in Kapolei.

== Geography ==
Ocean Pointe is located at 21°18'38" North, 158°2'11" West (21.310556, -158.036389), inland from ʻEwa Beach on the west side of the main thoroughfare, Fort Weaver Road (Hawaii Route 76). This highway runs north past ʻEwa to Waipahu, connecting there to Farrington Highway (State Rte. 90) and the H-1 freeway. A major cross street is Kapolei Parkway, which connects to Kapolei City Center.

More specifically, the CDP is located west of Fort Weaver Road, south of Keaunui Drive, east and south of Essex Road, north of the Pacific Ocean, north of Pupu Place, west of Pupu Street, and north of Papipi Road (not including Papipi Drive, however). According to the United States Census Bureau, the CDP has a total area of 2.14 square miles (5.5 km^{2}), of which 2.03 square miles (5.3 km^{2}) is land and 0.11 square miles (0.28 km^{2}) is covered by water.

== Demographics ==
Historical population
Census	Pop.	Note	%±
2010	8,361		—
2020	14,965		79.0%
U.S. Decennial Census

=== 2020 census ===
As of the 2020 census, Ocean Pointe had a population of 14,965. The median age was 34.5 years. 28.9% of residents were under the age of 18 and 8.1% of residents were 65 years of age or older. For every 100 females there were 97.9 males, and for every 100 females age 18 and over there were 96.7 males age 18 and over.

100.0% of residents lived in urban areas, while 0.0% lived in rural areas.

There were 4,512 households in Ocean Pointe, of which 48.9% had children under the age of 18 living in them. Of all households, 75.4% were married-couple households, 9.4% were households with a male householder and no spouse or partner present, and 10.9% were households with a female householder and no spouse or partner present. About 9.6% of all households were made up of individuals and 2.0% had someone living alone who was 65 years of age or older.

There were 4,632 housing units, of which 2.6% were vacant. The homeowner vacancy rate was 0.9% and the rental vacancy rate was 2.1%.

Racial composition as of the 2020 census
Race	Number	Percent
White	4,240	28.3%
Black or African American	882	5.9%
American Indian and Alaska Native	82	0.5%
Asian	4,741	31.7%
Native Hawaiian and Other Pacific Islander	673	4.5%
Some other race	374	2.5%
Two or more races	3,973	26.5%
Hispanic or Latino (of any race)	2,048	13.7%

=== 2010 census ===
As of the census of 2010, there were 8,361 people, 2,658 households, and 2,194 families residing in the CDP. The population density was 4,118.7 inhabitants per square mile (1,590.2/km^{2}). There were 2,928 housing units at an average density of 1,442.4 per square mile (556.9/km^{2}). The racial makeup of the CDP was 34.6% White, 7.4% African American, 0.6% Native American, 30.5% Asian, 4.1% Pacific Islander, 1.6% from other races, and 21.3% from two or more races. 10.7% of the population are Hispanic or Latino of any race.

There were 2,658 households, out of which 46.8% had children under the age of 18 living with them, 70.0% were married couples living together, 8.5% had a female householder with no husband present, and 17.5% were non-families. 11.7% of all households were made up of individuals, and 1.2% had someone living alone who was 65 years of age or older. The average household size was 3.14 and the average family size was 3.40.

In this CDP, the population was spread out, with 30.2% under the age of 18, 6.9% from 18 to 24, 38.5% from 25 to 44, 19.6% from 45 to 64, and 4.8% who were 65 years of age or older. The median age was 32.1 years. For every 100 females, there were 97.2 males. For every 100 females age 18 and over, there were 97.2 males.

== Development ==
The developer, Haseko Corporation, bought the community's 1,100 acres (450 hectares) of land "in 1988 and sold its first homes a decade later." The last of the Ocean Pointe community's 2,500 homes were completed in 2008, with development then progressing to Hoakalei. A golf course, designed by Ernie Els, opened at the adjacent Hoakalei Resort in 2009. A marina was under construction since 1997, and its plans were scaled back in November 2011 to a recreational lagoon. The 52-acre (21 ha) lagoon and shoreside commercial development is to open for public use in February 2023.

1,800 homeowners filed a class-action lawsuit against Haseko in July 2013, claiming the developer's change in plans regarding the marina affected their property values. In September 2015, a jury ruled that Haseko must pay the plaintiffs millions of dollars in damages, including $1,300 per household (tripled to nearly $4,000 because of its being a consumer protection case); Haseko questioned authorization of the punitive damages award and said it planned to appeal the judgment. A month later, a circuit judge set aside the award, saying the applicable law didn't allow punitive damages, and citing a lack of evidence that homeowners had sustained damages. In January 2018, another circuit judge ruled that Haseko had to pay homeowners $20 million based on evidence that "the switch from the marina to the lagoon was an economic decision by Haseko to save money", and concurring that Haseko misled homebuyers. As before, Haseko plans to appeal the ruling. Wai Kai, a water recreation and entertainment facility featuring a large wave pool, opened at the site in March 2023.

Safeway developed the Laulani Village Shopping Center on 20 acres (8.1 ha) of land at the northeastern tip of the CDP. A groundbreaking ceremony was held on November 3, 2011. City Mill, a chain of Oʻahu hardware stores, co-anchors the shopping center. Petco also joined the development's opening on November 16, 2012, with Walgreens and Ross opening in the second quarter of 2013. Safeway's development affiliate, Property Development Centers, sold the 223,000-square-foot (20,700 m^{2}) shopping center in January 2014 for nearly $100 million to Terramar Retail Centers of San Diego.

Construction of a 12,000-square-foot (1,100 m^{2}) replacement ʻEwa Beach Fire Station began in Ocean Pointe in late 2010 after a groundbreaking in October 2008; the project was built on 1 acre (0.40 ha) of donated land at the northeast corner of Keoneʻula Boulevard and Kaileoleʻa Drive and opened with a dedication ceremony on January 29, 2013.

== Education ==
The Hawaiʻi Department of Education operates the public schools; those within the CDP include Ewa Makai Middle School (2011), Keoneʻula Elementary School (2007), and ʻEwa Beach Elementary School (1959). Most of Ocean Pointe's neighborhoods are zoned to attend the newer elementary school. A local private school is the Seagull School at Ocean Pointe.
