= ʻEwa Gentry, Hawaii =

Census-designated place in Hawaii, United States

ʻEwa Gentry
- Census-designated place
- ʻEwa by Gentry, Hawaii

- Location in Honolulu County and the state of Hawaii

- Location within Hawaii
- Coordinates: 21°20′22″N 158°1′47″W
- Country: United States
- State: Hawaii
- County: Honolulu

Area
  - Total: 2.13 sq mi (5.51 km^{2})
  - Land: 2.13 sq mi (5.51 km^{2})
  - Water: 0 sq mi (0.00 km^{2})
- Elevation: 39 ft (12 m)

Population (2020)
  - Total: 25,707
  - Density: 12,075.0/sq mi (4,662.19/km^{2})
- Time zone: UTC-10 (Hawaii-Aleutian)
- ZIP code: 96706
- Area code: 808
- FIPS code: 15-07470
- GNIS feature ID: 1867249

ʻEwa Gentry is a housing development and, as Ewa Gentry, a census-designated place (CDP) located in the ʻEwa District and the City & County of Honolulu on the leeward side of Oʻahu in Hawaiʻi about twelve miles (19 km) from Honolulu. As of the 2010 Census, the CDP had a total population of 22,690.

This area is also known as just ʻEwa (in Hawaiian, ʻewa means "crooked"). In the late 19th century to early 20th century, ʻEwa was one of the large population centers on the Island of Oʻahu, with industry focused around sugar cane production. The ʻEwa Mill, in ʻEwa was a major employer that set up residential villages. Sugar cane is no longer grown on the ʻEwa Plain and ʻEwa Gentry is now part of Oʻahu's new suburban growth center—an area of substantial sprawl spreading unbroken to the south to ʻEwa Gentry, north to Honouliuli, and west to Kalaeloa and Kapolei. This area is now referred to as Oʻahu's Second City, with a city center (downtown) located in Kapolei.

== Geography ==
ʻEwa Gentry is located at 21°20'22" North, 158°1'47" West (21.339441, -158.029725), inland from ʻEwa Gentry on the west side of the main thoroughfare, Fort Weaver Road (State Rte. 76). This highway runs north past ʻEwa to Waipahu, connecting there to Farrington Highway (State Rte. 90) and the H-1 freeway. Major cross streets are Kapolei Parkway, which will eventually connect to Kapolei City Center and Geiger Road, which runs westward to Kalaeloa.

According to the United States Census Bureau, the CDP has a total area of 0.3 square miles (0.78 km^{2}), of which, 0.3 square miles (0.78 km^{2}) of it is land and none of it is covered by water.

== Demographics ==
Historical population
Census	Pop.	Note	%±
1990	1,992		—
2000	4,939		147.9%
2010	22,690		359.4%
2020	25,707		13.3%

As of the census of 2000, there were 4,939 people, 1,734 households, and 1,239 families residing in the CDP. The population density was 15,627.7 inhabitants per square mile (6,033.9/km^{2}). There were 1,843 housing units at an average density of 5,831.5 per square mile (2,251.6/km^{2}). The racial makeup of the CDP was 15.19% White, 3.87% African American, 0.18% Native American, 51.35% Asian, 5.12% Pacific Islander, 1.03% from other races, and 23.26% from two or more races. 8.69% of the population are Hispanic or Latino of any race.

There were 1,734 households, out of which 44.4% had children under the age of 18 living with them, 59.6% were married couples living together, 7.5% had a female householder with no husband present, and 28.5% were non-families. 20.8% of all households were made up of individuals, and 1.2% had someone living alone who was 65 years of age or older. The average household size was 2.85 and the average family size was 3.39.

In this CDP the population was spread out, with 28.6% under the age of 18, 7.9% from 18 to 24, 45.2% from 25 to 44, 14.1% from 45 to 64, and 4.2% who were 65 years of age or older. The median age was 32 years. For every 100 females there were 104.3 males. For every 100 females age 18 and over, there were 104.8 males.

The median income for a household in the CDP was $61,462, and the median income for a family was $70,633. Males had a median income of $39,354 versus $30,152 for females. The per capita income for the CDP was $21,833. 2.6% of the population and 1.4% of families were below the poverty line. Out of the total population, 0.9% of those under the age of 18 and 0.0% of those 65 and older were living below the poverty line.
