= ʻEwa Beach, Hawaii =

Census-designated place in Hawaii, United States

ʻEwa Beach ʻEwa
- Census-designated place
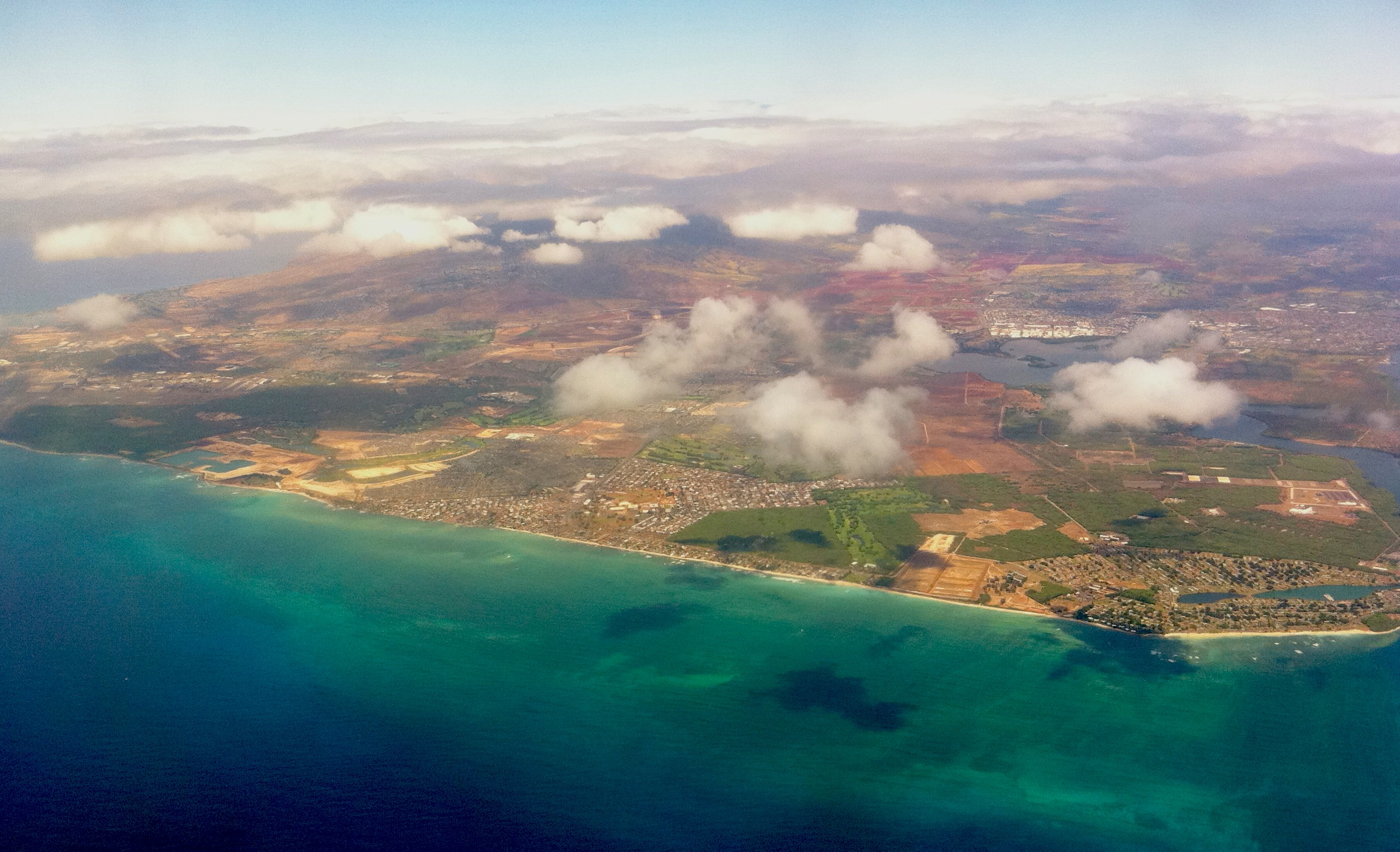
- Aerial photo of the ʻEwa Beach area of Oʻahu

- Location in Honolulu County and the state of Hawaiʻi
- Coordinates: 21°18′56″N 158°0′26″W
- Country: United States
- State: Hawaii
- County: Honolulu

Area
  - Total: 1.63 sq mi (4.23 km^{2})
  - Land: 1.19 sq mi (3.09 km^{2})
  - Water: 0.44 sq mi (1.15 km^{2})
- Elevation: 9.8 ft (3 m)

Population (2020)
  - Total: 16,415
  - Density: 13,779.6/sq mi (5,320.34/km^{2})
- Time zone: UTC-10 (Hawaii-Aleutian)
- ZIP code: 96706
- Area code: 808
- FIPS code: 15-07450
- GNIS feature ID: 0358767

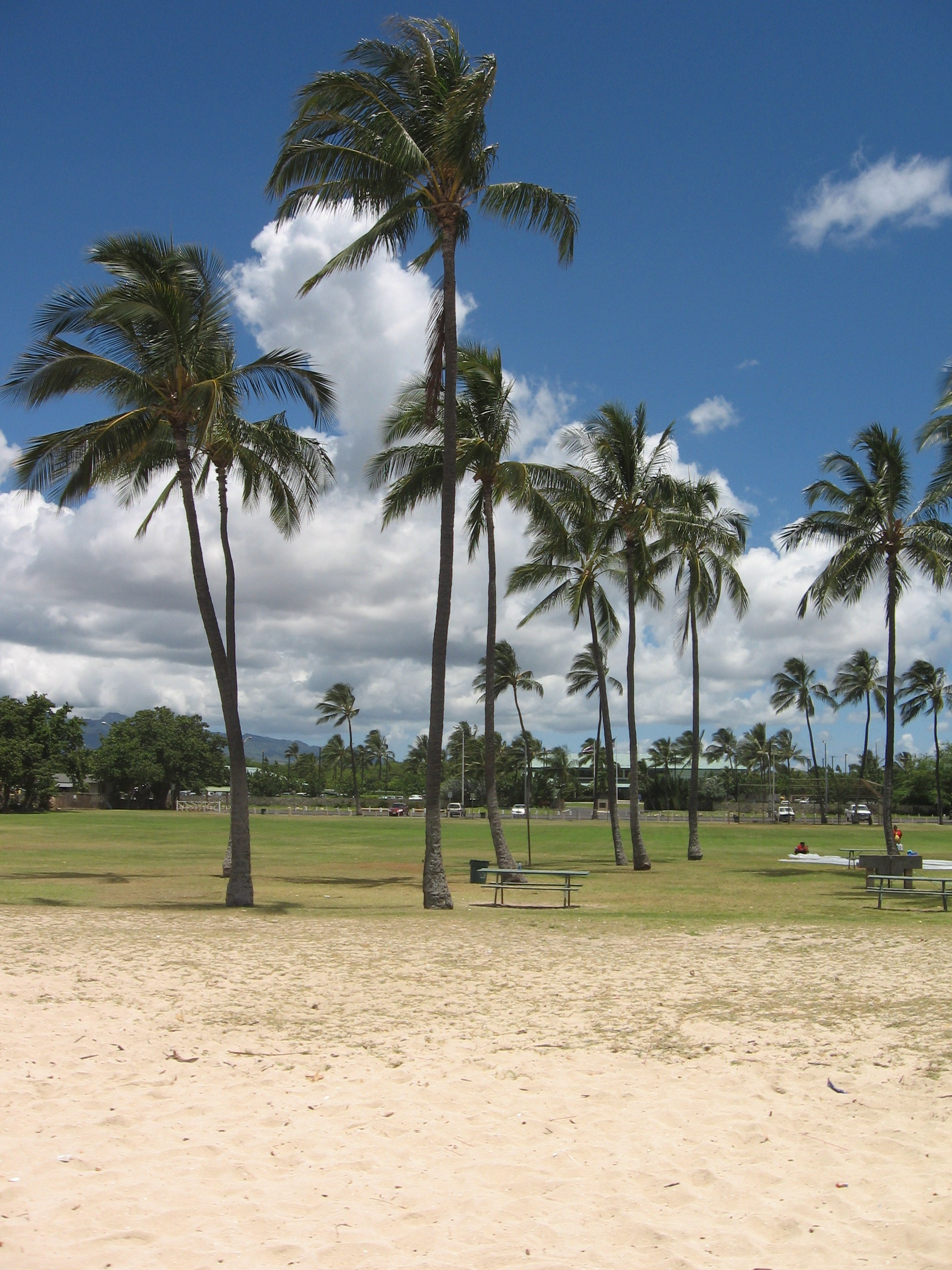
Ewa Beach Park

ʻEwa Beach (/ɛvə/) or simply ʻEwa (Hawaiian pronunciation: [ˈʔɛvə];) is a census-designated place (CDP) located in ʻEwa District and the City & County of Honolulu along the coast of Māmala Bay on the leeward side of Oʻahu in Hawaii. As of the 2020 Census, the CDP had a total population of 16,415. The U.S. postal code for ʻEwa Beach is 96706.

== History and etymology ==
The word ʻewa means "stray" in Hawaiian. The name comes from the myth that the gods Kāne and Kanaloa threw a stone to determine the boundaries, but it was lost and later found at Pili o Kahe. Hawaiian settlement on the ʻEwa Plain dates back at least to the 12th century C.E., at which time kanaka maoli expanded the main channel of Puʻuloa (Pearl Harbor) before creating fishponds and terraced agricultural fields in the surrounding area. Scholars have recognized ʻEwa's ancient fishponds as exemplary evidence of Native Hawaiian ingenuity.

Before Ewa Beach became a town, it was first a huge sugar plantation. With 11,000 acres (4,500 ha) of land sublet by Benjamin Dillingham, W.R. Lowrie became the first plantation manager in 1891, when Hawaiʻi was under the rule of Queen Liliʻuokalani. Ewa Beach is significant for its association with Ewa Sugar Plantation. Throughout the twentieth century, it played a very influential role in Hawaii's culture, economy, and politics.

Along much of the South Shore of Oʻahu, ʻEwa is a reference to the direction of ʻEwa Beach, roughly westwards along the shore. Related terms are "mauka" (towards the mountains, roughly northwards), "makai" (towards the ocean, roughly south), and Diamond Head or Koko Head, roughly eastwards along the shore.

== Geography ==
ʻEwa Beach is located at 21°18'56" North, 158°0'26" West. The main thoroughfare is Fort Weaver Road (State Rte. 76) which runs north (away from the coast) past ʻEwa to Waipahu, connecting there to Farrington Highway (State Rte. 90) and the H-1 freeway.

According to the United States Census Bureau, the CDP has a total area of 1.9 square miles (4.9 km^{2}), of which 1.4 square miles (3.6 km^{2}) is land and 0.4 square miles (1.0 km^{2}) is water. The total area is 24.06% water, consisting entirely of the Pacific Ocean off the island shore.

The ʻEwa Beach CDP does not include Ocean Pointe, ʻEwa Gentry, Iroquois Point, or ʻEwa Villages, though these are included within the postal service's ZIP code for the area.

== Climate ==
Climate data for Ewa Beach
Month	Jan	Feb	Mar	Apr	May	Jun	Jul	Aug	Sep	Oct	Nov	Dec	Year
Mean daily maximum °F (°C)	80.5 (26.9)	80.6 (27.0)	81.4 (27.4)	83.0 (28.3)	84.4 (29.1)	86.6 (30.3)	87.6 (30.9)	88.3 (31.3)	88.3 (31.3)	86.7 (30.4)	84.2 (29.0)	81.6 (27.6)	84.4 (29.1)
Mean daily minimum °F (°C)	63.2 (17.3)	62.7 (17.1)	64.4 (18.0)	66.2 (19.0)	67.4 (19.7)	69.8 (21.0)	71.1 (21.7)	71.4 (21.9)	70.4 (21.3)	69.6 (20.9)	67.9 (19.9)	65.3 (18.5)	67.4 (19.7)
Average precipitation inches (mm)	3.1 (79)	2.2 (56)	2.2 (56)	1.2 (30)	1.0 (25)	0.4 (10)	0.5 (13)	0.4 (10)	0.7 (18)	1.9 (48)	2.8 (71)	3.3 (84)	19.8 (500)
Source: Weatherbase

== Demographics ==
Historical population
Census	Pop.	Note	%±
2000	14,650		—
2010	14,955		2.1%
2020	16,415		9.8%
U.S. Decennial Census

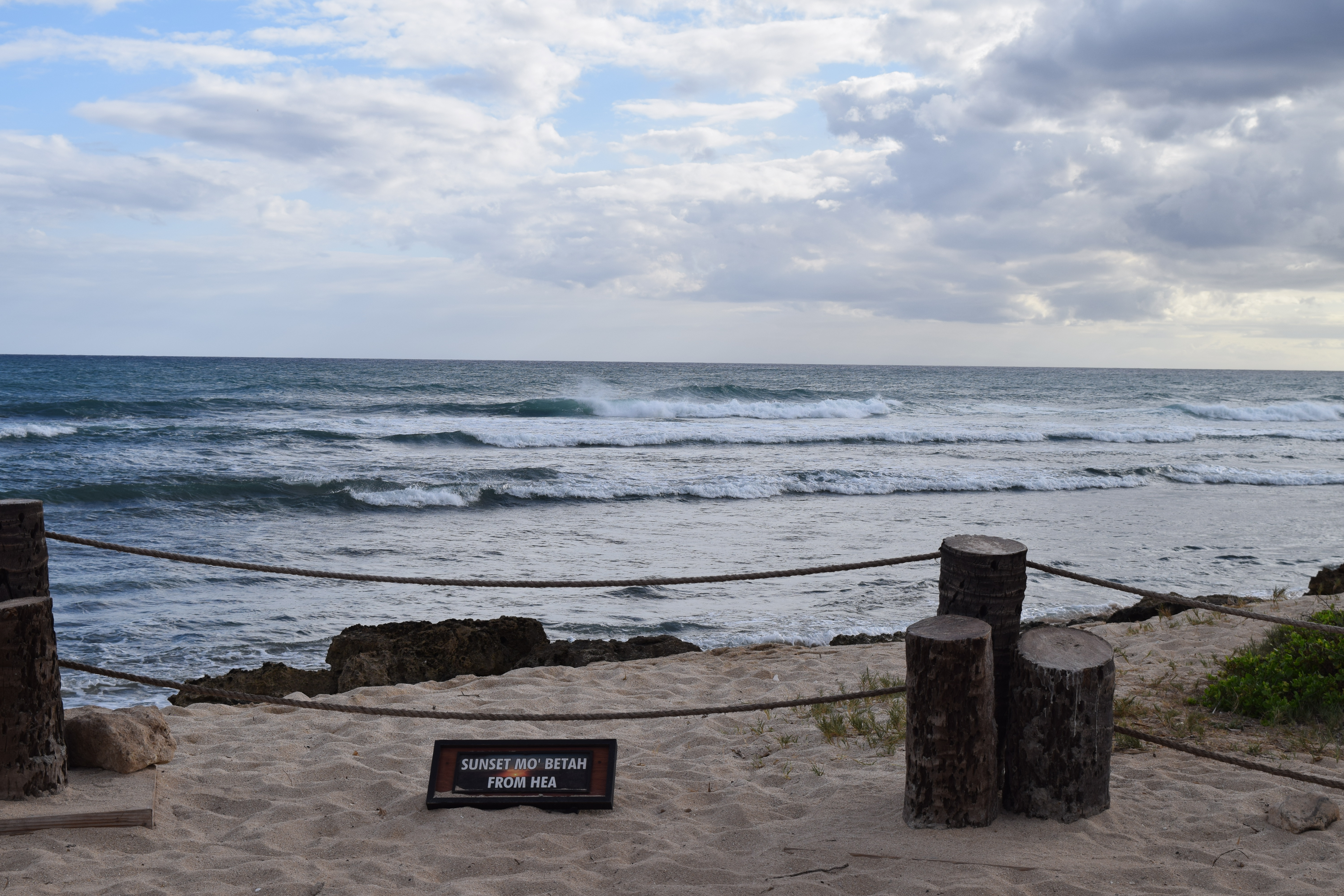
Ewa beach view to southwest

As of the census there were 16,415 people forming 3,415 households in the CDP. The population density was 10,682.1 inhabitants per square mile (4,124.4/km^{2}). The racial makeup of the CDP was 6.1% White, 0.0% African American, 0.0% Native American, 54.5% Asian, 11.6% Pacific Islander 11.6% Hispanic or Latino of any race, and 27.6% from two or more races.

There were 3,415 households, out of which 19.% had children under the age of 18 and a further 5.1% children under 5 living with them. The average household size was 4.38 people per household.

As of the 2020 census, the median income for a household in the CDP was $114,207 with the per capita income for the CDP was $32,248. 6.4% of the population were recorded as below the poverty line.

== Government and infrastructure ==
The United States Postal Service operates the ʻEwa Beach Post Office in ʻEwa Beach. The Pacific Tsunami Warning Center is also headquartered in the CDP.

== Education ==
ʻEwa Beach is served by the Hawai'i Department of Education.

Elementary schools in the 'Ewa Beach CDP include ʻEwa Beach, Kaʻimiloa, and Pohakea. Ilima Intermediate School, and James Campbell High School are in 'Ewa Beach CDP.

Schools nearby but outside the CDP include Iroquois Point Elementary School (near but not in the Iroquois Point CDP), Holomua Elementary School, Keone'ula Elementary and 'Ewa Makai Middle.

The Hawaii State Public Library System operates the Ewa Beach Public & School Library. Established on the property of Campbell High on August 28, 1971, it is a dual purpose school library and community library.

== Little League World Series ==
In 2005, the team from ʻEwa Beach, representing (locally) West Oʻahu and the United States, captured the Little League World Series crown, beating Curaçao 7–6 in an extra inning after a walk-off home run by Michael Memea.

== Notable people ==
- David Alcos, politician
- Bretman Rock (born 1998), social media personality
- Jaron-Keawe Sagapolutele (born 2006), American football quarterback for the California Golden Bears
- Tua Tagovailoa (born 1998), American football quarterback for the Atlanta Falcons
- Taulia Tagovailoa (born 2000), American football quarterback for the Canadian football team Hamilton Tiger-Cats
