= Pearl Harbor National Wildlife Refuge =

- IUCN category IV (habitat/species management area)
- Location within Hawaii
- Location: Oʻahu, Hawaii, United States
- Coordinates: 21°23′23″N 157°59′08″W
- Established: 1972
- Governing body: U.S. Fish and Wildlife Service
- Website: Pearl Harbor National Wildlife Refuge

The Pearl Harbor National Wildlife Refuge is a United States National Wildlife Refuge on the island of Oʻahu, Hawaii. It was created in 1972 to mitigate the wildlife resource disturbances caused by construction of the Honolulu International Airport Reef Runway. The Refuge includes three units, the Honouliuli, Waiwa and Kalaeloa. The Honouliuli and Waiawa Units are managed under a cooperative agreement with the United States Navy. The Kalaeloa Unit was established during Base Realignment and Closure proceedings in 2001. Through these cooperative efforts with the Federal Aviation Administration, the State of Hawaii, and the U.S. Navy, the U.S. Fish and Wildlife Service made Pearl Harbor NWR a reality.

== Landscape and natural resources ==
The Honouliuli Unit contains two freshwater wetland impoundments that are intensively managed to provide habitat for a variety of waterbirds, including Hawaii's endangered waterbirds and migrant waterfowl. These two impoundments contain nesting islands, aquatic vegetation and mudflats that are used as nesting and foraging areas by various waterbird species throughout the year.

The Waiawa Unit is composed of two brackish ponds, one of which is primarily managed for the endangered aeʻo (a subspecies of the common black-winged stilt, Himantopus mexicanus knudseni). However, the pond's estuarine environment is ideal for establishing a host of food resources for four endangered waterbird species found there.

The Kalaeloa Unit, once part of the former Barbers Point Naval Air Station, was added to the Pearl Harbor NWR to protect the endangered ʻEwa Hinahina (Achyranthes splendens var. rotundata) and ʻAkoko (Euphorbia skottsbergii). This area of raised limestone coral reef contains the last remaining ancient coastal dry shrubland plant communities that were once widespread throughout the ʻEwa Plain. It is also home to anchialine pools, which are pools of saltwater connected to the ocean via minute cracks in the limestone. These are home to the ʻōpaeʻula (Hawaiian shrimp, Halocaridina rubra).

Kalaeloa, on Oʻahu, remains a habitat where native coastal plants thrive alongside two endangered species: the ʻAkoko (Euphorbia skottsbergii)—which has the largest population on Oʻahu—and the endangered ʻEwa Hinahina, which has the second-largest population in this area.

Notable native plants include:

- Maiapilo (Capparis sandwichiana), a night-blooming species with fragrant flowers;
- Hinahina, a dense, soft, and silky-looking plant;
- Naio (Myoporum sandwicense), one of the few native species that effectively competes with invasive alien grasses.

.

== Public use ==
To protect the delicate habitats, the refuge is closed to visitors, except for Betty Bliss Memorial Overlook, which is open year-round.
