= ʻĀina Haina, Hawaii =

Unincorporated Town in Honolulu, Hawaii, United States

Coordinates: 21°16.714′N 157°44.996′W

ʻĀina Haina is an unincorporated town of the City & County of Honolulu in the state of Hawaiʻi of the United States. Located on the island of Oʻahu, ʻĀina Haina is a residential community developed around Kalanianaole Highway east of Waikīkī and Diamond Head. ʻĀina Haina was named after local dairyman and owner of Hind-Clarke Dairy, Robert Hind. ʻĀina Haina in the Hawaiian language means "Hind's Land". A main street is a loop named Hind Drive for him. ʻĀina Haina has two elementary schools (Aina Haina Elementary School and Holy Nativity School) and a shopping center.

In the 2000 United States census the United States Census Bureau defined the area as being in the urban Honolulu census-designated place. For the 2010 United States census the bureau created a new census-designated place, East Honolulu.

== Education ==
Hawaii Department of Education operates public schools. Aina Haina Elementary School is the local elementary school.

Holy Nativity School is an Episcopal Church school operated by The Church of the Holy Nativity in Aina Haina.

Honolulu Waldorf School had a high school in Aina Haina which closed admissions in 2019 and operated until 2020.

Hawaii State Public Library System maintains the Aina Haina Public Library.
