= Pearl Harbor =

Harbor on the island of Oahu, Hawaii

- Location within Hawaii Location within Pacific Ocean
- Interactive map of Pearl Harbor
- Coordinates: 21.3679°N 157.9771°W

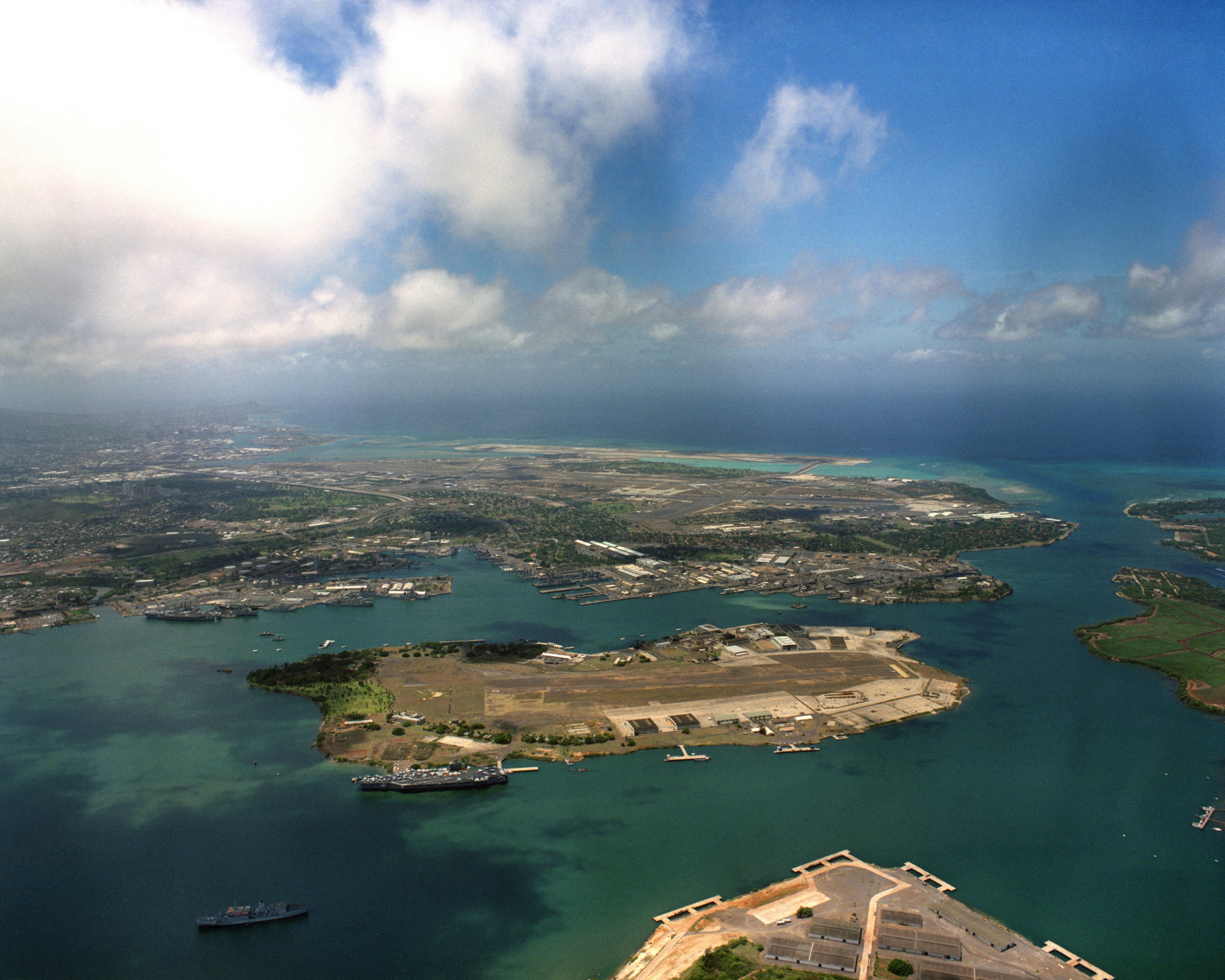
Seen in 1986 with Ford Island in center.

Pearl Harbor is a lagoon harbor on the island of Oʻahu, Hawaii, United States, west of Honolulu. It was often visited by the naval fleet of the United States before it was acquired from the Hawaiian Kingdom by the U.S. with the signing of the Reciprocity Treaty of 1875. Much of the harbor and surrounding lands are now a United States Navy deep-water naval base. It is also the headquarters of the United States Pacific Fleet. The U.S. government first obtained exclusive use of the inlet and the right to maintain a repair and coaling station for ships here in 1887. The surprise attack on the harbor by the Imperial Japanese Navy on December 7, 1941, led the United States to declare war on the Empire of Japan, marking the United States' entry into World War II.

== History ==
Pearl Harbor was originally an extensive shallow embayment called Wai Momi (meaning 'Waters of Pearl') or Puʻuloa (meaning 'long hill') by the Hawaiians. Puʻuloa was regarded as the home of the shark goddess, Kaʻahupahau, and her brother (or son), Kahiʻuka, in Hawaiian legends. According to tradition, Keaunui, the head of the powerful Ewa chiefs, is credited with cutting a navigable channel near the present Puʻuloa saltworks, by which he made the estuary, known as "Pearl River", accessible to navigation. Making due allowance for legendary amplification, the estuary already had an outlet for its waters where the present gap is; but Keaunui is typically given the credit for widening and deepening it.

=== Nineteenth century ===
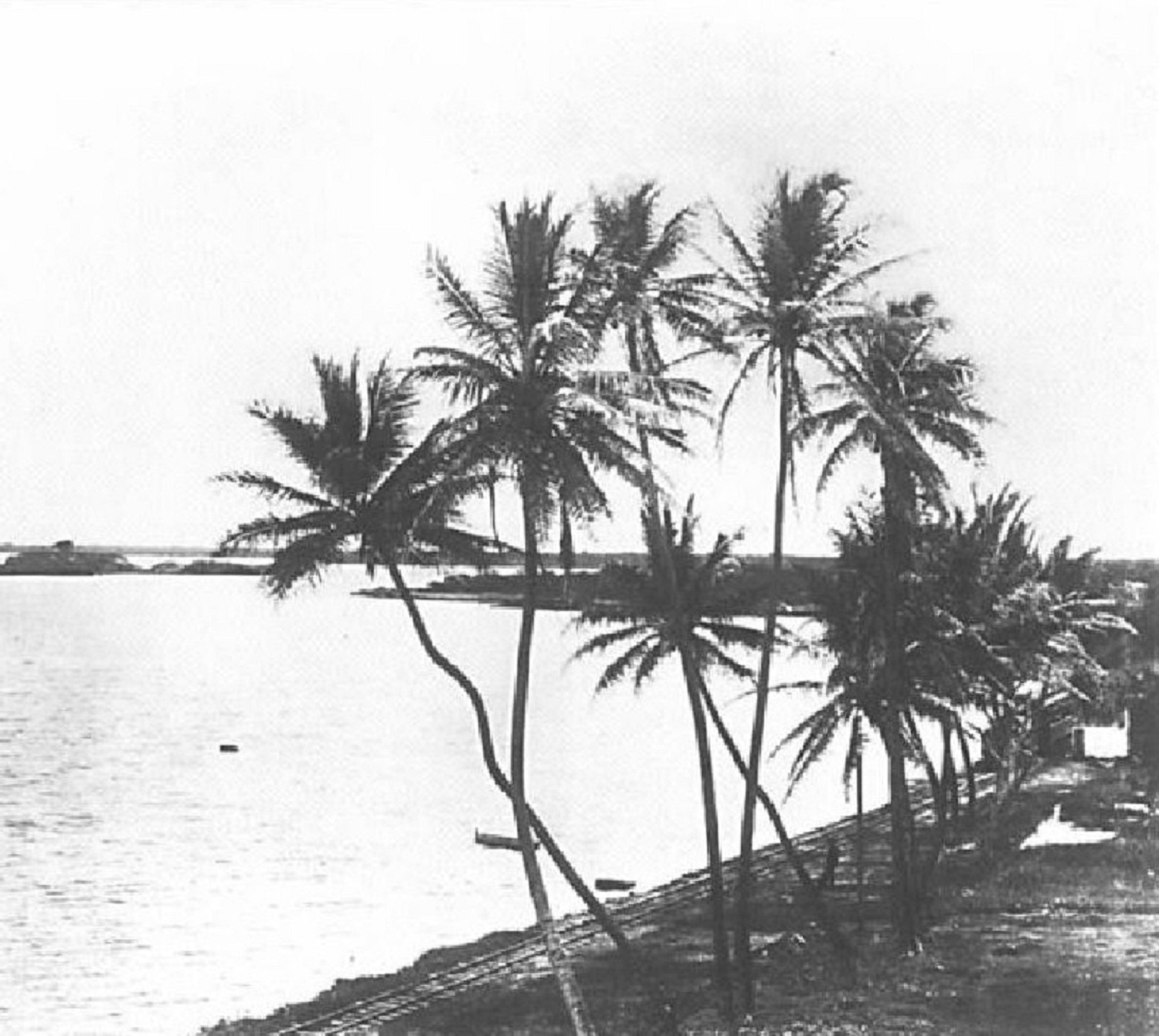
Pearl Harbor in the 1880s

During the early nineteenth century, Pearl Harbor was not used for large ships because of its shallow entrance. The United States' interest in the Hawaiian Islands grew as a result of its whaling, shipping and trading activity in the Pacific. As early as 1820, an "Agent of the United States for Commerce and Seamen" was appointed to look after American business in the Port of Honolulu. These commercial ties to the American continent were accompanied by the work of the American Board of Commissioners for Foreign Missions. American missionaries and their families became an integral part of the Hawaiian political body.

Throughout the 1820s and 1830s, many American warships visited Honolulu. In most cases, the commanding officers carried letters from the U.S. Government giving advice on governmental affairs and of the relations of the island nation with foreign powers. In 1841, the newspaper Polynesian, printed in Honolulu, advocated that the U.S. establish a naval base in Hawaii for the protection of American citizens engaged in the whaling industry. The British Hawaiian Minister of Foreign Affairs Robert Crichton Wyllie, remarked in 1840 that, "... my opinion is that the tide of events rushes on to annexation to the United States."

After the conclusion of the Civil War and the American purchase of Alaska, both the increased world importance of the Pacific states and the presence of exporters seeking a duty-free market for Hawaiian staples in Asian countries caused Hawaiian trade to expand. In 1865, the North Pacific Squadron was formed to embrace the western coast and Hawaii. Lackawanna in the following year was assigned to cruise among the islands, "a locality of great and increasing interest and importance". This vessel surveyed the Northwestern Hawaiian Islands toward Japan. As a result, the United States claimed Midway Island. The Secretary of the Navy was able to write in his annual report of 1868, that in November 1867, 42 American flags flew over whaleships and merchant vessels in Honolulu to only six of other nations. This increased activity caused the permanent assignment of at least one warship to Hawaiian waters. It also praised Midway Island as possessing a harbor surpassing Honolulu's. In the following year, Congress approved an appropriation of $50,000 on March 1, 1869, to deepen the approaches to this harbor.

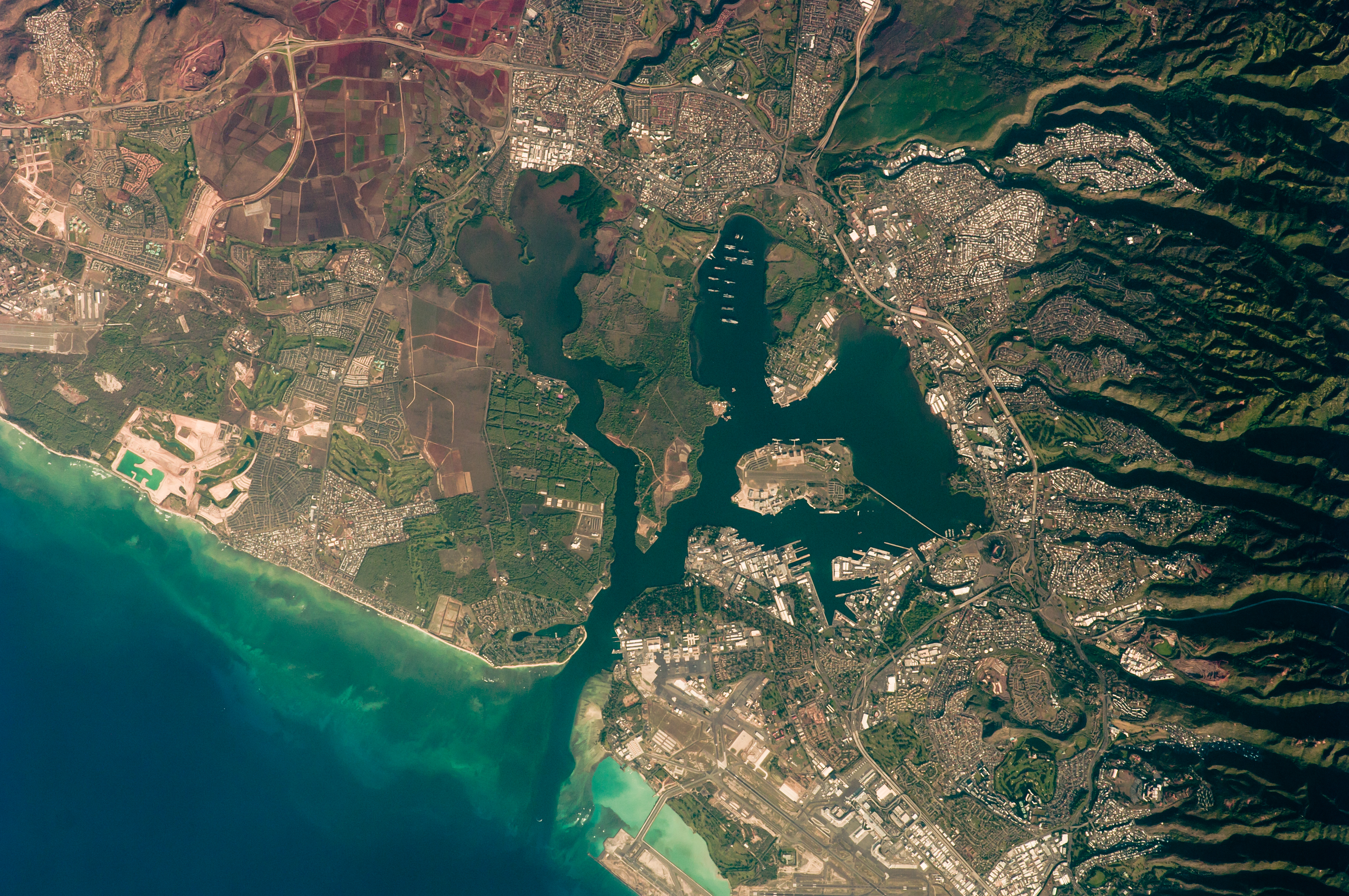
Astronaut photograph of Pearl Harbor from October 2009

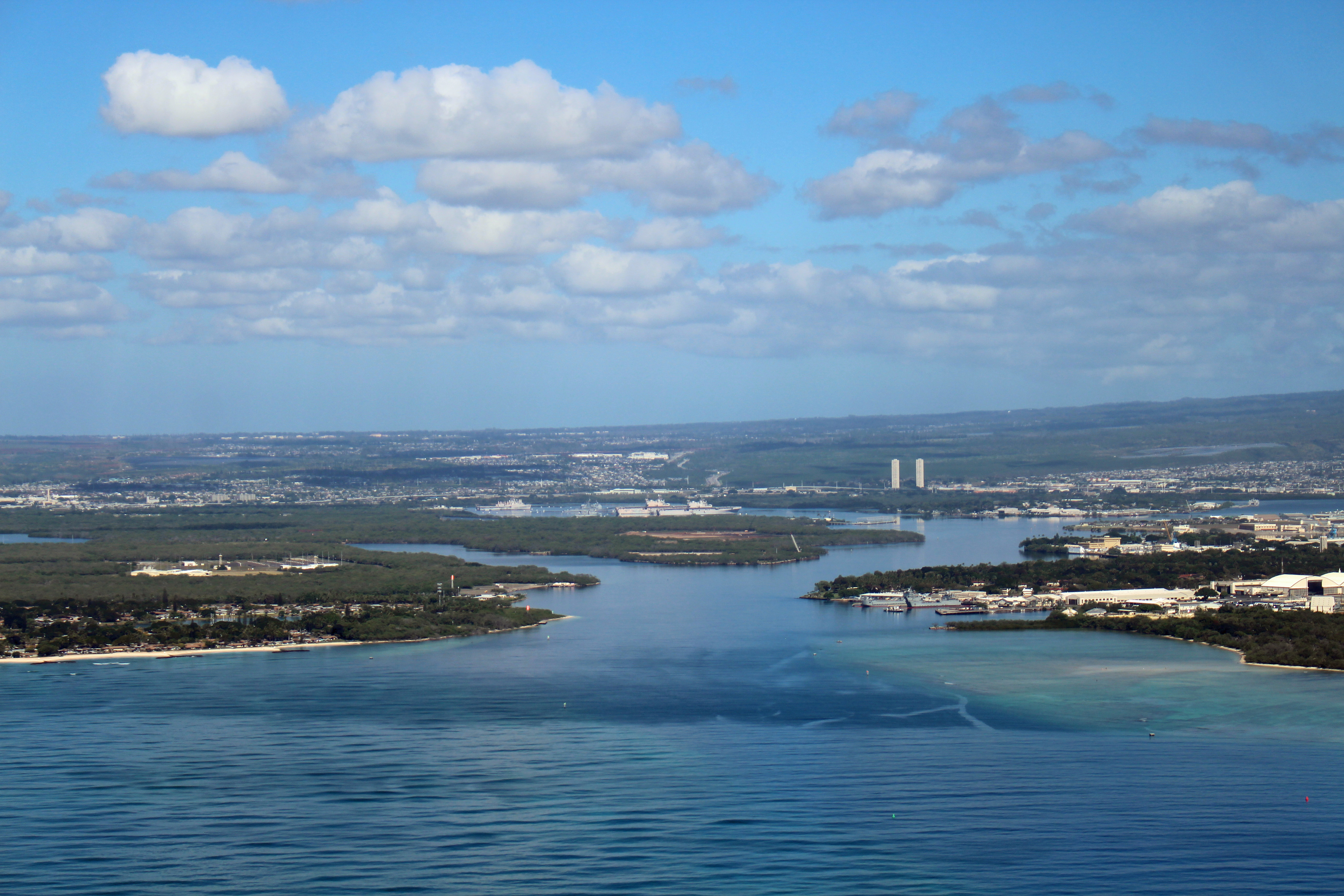
Entrance to Pearl Harbor

After 1868, when the Commander of the Pacific Fleet visited the islands to look after American interests, naval officers played an important role in internal affairs. They served as arbitrators in business disputes, negotiators of trade agreements and defenders of law and order. Periodic voyages among the islands and to the mainland aboard U.S. warships were arranged for members of the Hawaiian royal family and important island government officials. When King Lunalilo died in 1873, negotiations were underway for the cession of Pearl Harbor as a port for the duty-free export of sugar to the U.S. With the election of King Kalākaua in March 1874, a riot prompted landing of sailors from USS Tuscarora and Portsmouth. The British warship, HMS Tenedos, also landed a token force. During the reign of King Kalākaua the United States was granted exclusive rights to enter Pearl Harbor and to establish "a coaling and repair station".

Although this treaty continued in force until August 1898, the U.S. did not fortify Pearl Harbor as a naval base. As it had for 60 years, the shallow entrance constituted a formidable barrier against the use of the deep protected waters of the inner harbor.

The United States and the Hawaiian Kingdom signed the Reciprocity Treaty of 1875 as supplemented by Convention on December 6, 1884. This treaty was ratified in 1887. On January 20, 1887, the United States Senate allowed the Navy the exclusive right to maintain a coaling and repair station at Pearl Harbor. (The US took possession on November 9 that year). The Spanish–American War of 1898 and the desire for the United States to have a permanent presence in the Pacific both contributed to the decision.

=== Naval presence (1899–present) ===
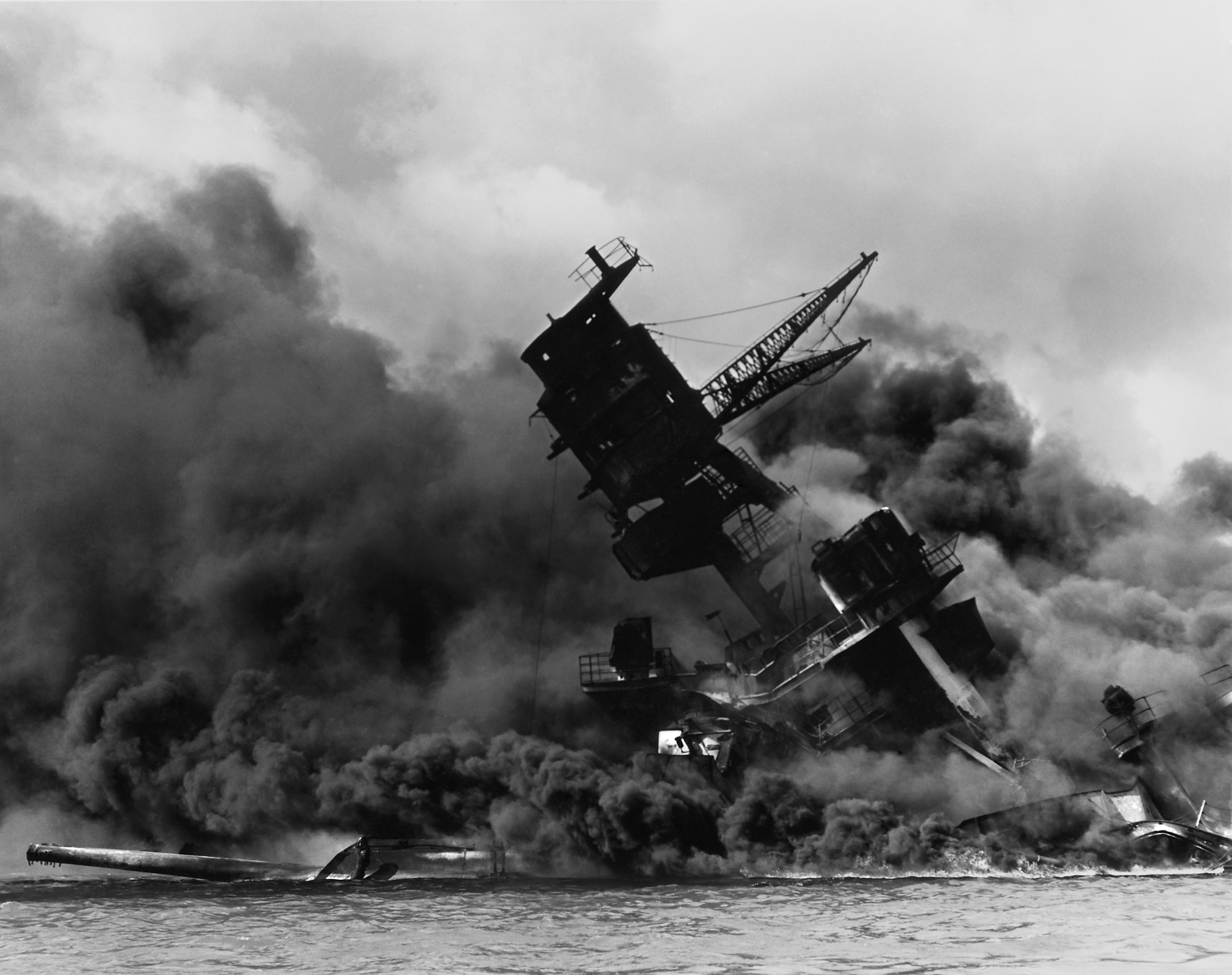
USS Arizona, during the Japanese attack on Pearl Harbor, December 7, 1941

Following the overthrow of the Hawaiian Kingdom, the United States Navy established a base on the island in 1899. On December 7, 1941, the base was attacked by the Imperial Japanese Navy airplanes and midget submarines, causing the American entry into World War II. There was no meaningful plan for the air defense of Hawaii, for American commanders thought the Japanese would attack either Wake Island or the Philippines and had no understanding of the capabilities and proper employment of air power. As it was, had the Pacific Fleet acted on the war warnings, it undoubtedly would have sortied and been at sea on December 7, where the major ships would have been sunk in deep water, making salvage impossible. Shortly after the devastating Japanese surprise attack at Pearl Harbor, two American military commanders, Lt. Gen. Walter Short and Adm. Husband Kimmel, were demoted of their full ranks. The two American commanders later sought to restore their reputations and full ranks.

==== Post–World War II ====
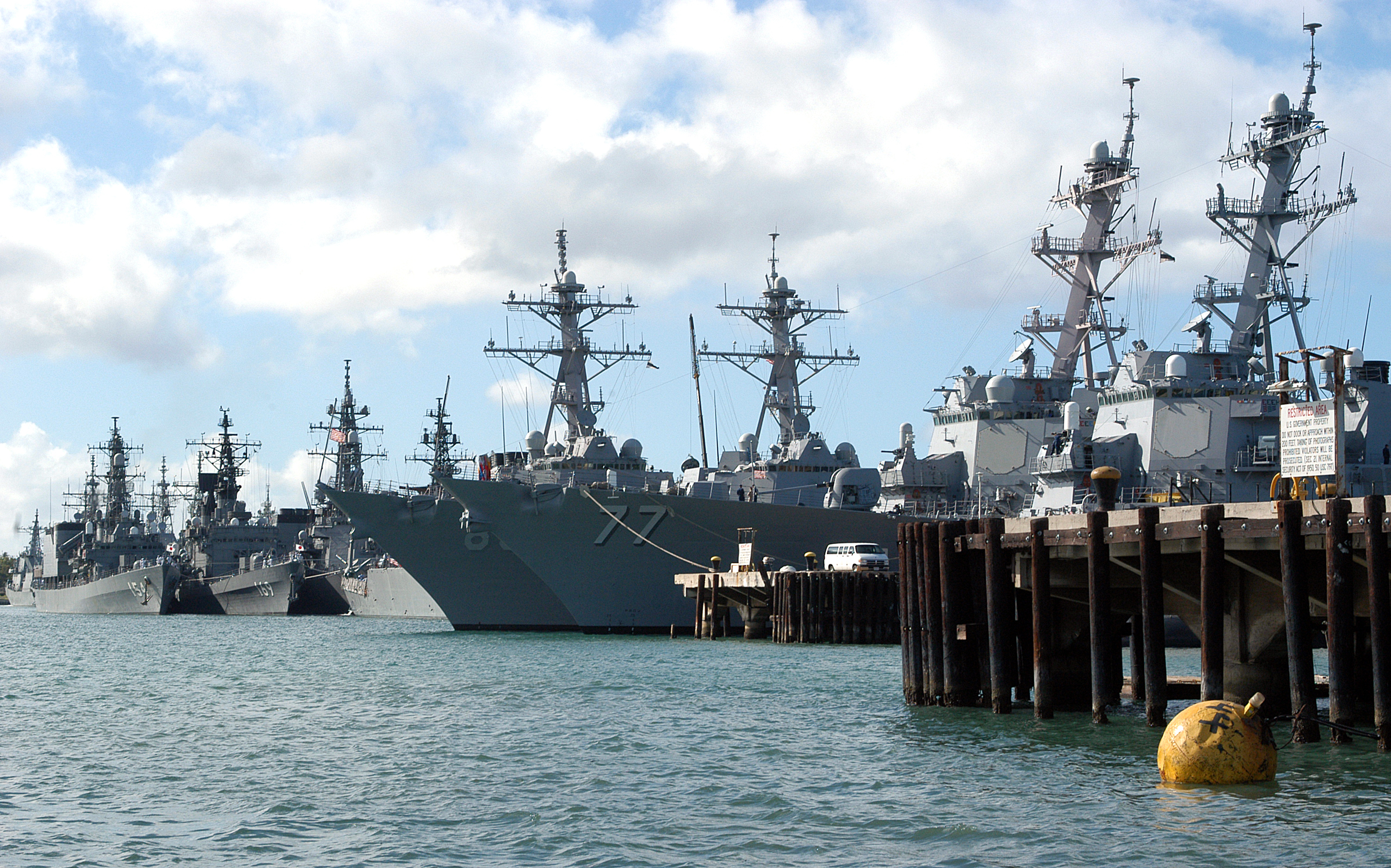
Warships from various nations at Pearl Harbor for the 2004 RIMPAC exercises

Over the years, Pearl Harbor remained a main base for the US Pacific Fleet after World War II along with Naval Base San Diego. In 2010, the Navy and the Air Force merged their two nearby bases; Pearl Harbor joined with Hickam Air Force Base to create Joint Base Pearl Harbor–Hickam.

In December 2016, Japanese Prime Minister Shinzo Abe made a joint visit to Pearl Harbor with US President Barack Obama. This trip marked the 75th anniversary of the attack and was the first official visit by a sitting Japanese leader.

On December 4, 2019, a US Navy sailor killed two civilian workers and wounded another, before shooting himself at the Pearl Harbor Naval Shipyard.

== Environmental contamination ==
On October 14, 1992, the US Environmental Protection Agency added the Pearl Harbor Naval Complex as a superfund to the so-called National Priorities List.

== See also ==
- Admiral Clarey Bridge
- Pearl Harbor National Wildlife Refuge
- USS Pearl Harbor
