= ʻEwa Villages, Hawaii =

Census-designated place in Hawaii, United States

ʻEwa Villages
- Census-designated place
- Location in Honolulu County and the state of Hawaii
- Coordinates: 21°20′32″N 158°2′30″W
- Country: United States
- State: Hawaii
- County: Honolulu

Area
  - Total: 1.13 sq mi (2.92 km^{2})
  - Land: 1.13 sq mi (2.92 km^{2})
  - Water: 0 sq mi (0.00 km^{2})
- Elevation: 59 ft (18 m)

Population (2020)
  - Total: 7,825
  - Density: 6,939.3/sq mi (2,679.28/km^{2})
- Time zone: UTC-10 (Hawaii-Aleutian)
- Area code: 808
- FIPS code: 15-07485
- GNIS feature ID: 1867250

ʻEwa Villages is a census-designated place (CDP) located in the ʻEwa District and the City & County of Honolulu on the leeward side of Oʻahu in Hawaiʻi approximately 20 miles (32 km) from downtown Honolulu. As of the 2020 census, the CDP had a population of 7,825.

This area was previously known as ʻEwa (in Hawaiian, ʻewa means "crooked"). In the late 19th century to early 20th century, ʻEwa was one of the large population centers on the island of Oʻahu, with industry focused around sugar cane production. The ʻEwa Mill was a major employer that set up residential villages within ʻEwa (from which the modern name arose). Sugar cane is no longer grown on the ʻEwa Plain and ʻEwa is now one of Oʻahu's suburban growth centers—an area of substantial sprawl spreading unbroken to ʻEwa Gentry and ʻEwa Beach on the south, Kalaeloa on the southwest, and Kapolei on the west. This area is now referred to as Oʻahu's Second City, with a city center (downtown) located in Kapolei.

Honouliuli is a former village and now a place name for the north end of ʻEwa, lying along Honouliuli Stream between ʻEwa Villages and Waipahu.

The U.S. postal code for ʻEwa is 96706, the same as ʻEwa Beach.

== Geography ==
Ewa Villages is located at 21°20′32″N 158°2′30″W (21.342155, -158.041679), inland from ʻEwa Beach along the main thoroughfare of State Rte. 76 (Fort Weaver Road). This highway runs north past Honouliuli to Waipahu, connecting there to Farrington Highway and the H-1 freeway. The main east–west thoroughfare in ʻEwa Villages is Renton Road which connects to Kalaeloa and Kapolei to the west. Eventually, the Kapolei Parkway will replace Renton Road as the main east–west thoroughfare for the Second City south of H-1 and Farrington Highway.

According to the United States Census Bureau, the CDP has a total area of 1.1 square miles (2.9 km^{2}), all land.

ʻEwa is a widely used directional term on Oʻahu, referring to the direction of the town of ʻEwa but meaning westward to those residing and working in Honolulu. Its opposite is "Diamond Head" (located at the east end of Waikīkī) or "Koko Head" (located still further east of downtown Honolulu).

Honouliuli Internment Camp, a World War II–era internment camp, operated there from 1943 to 1945.

=== Climate ===
The climate of ʻEwa Villages is closer to that of Honolulu. It is a typical hot semi-arid climate (Köppen: BSh).

Climate data for ʻEwa Villages, Hawaii (1991-2020)
Month	Jan	Feb	Mar	Apr	May	Jun	Jul	Aug	Sep	Oct	Nov	Dec	Year
Mean daily maximum °F (°C)	79.8 (26.6)	80.0 (26.7)	80.5 (26.9)	82.3 (27.9)	83.6 (28.7)	85.7 (29.8)	86.5 (30.3)	87.4 (30.8)	87.0 (30.6)	85.8 (29.9)	83.6 (28.7)	81.2 (27.3)	83.6 (28.7)
Daily mean °F (°C)	71.0 (21.7)	71.4 (21.9)	72.2 (22.3)	74.0 (23.3)	75.3 (24.1)	77.4 (25.2)	78.5 (25.8)	79.2 (26.2)	78.2 (25.7)	77.4 (25.2)	75.3 (24.1)	73.1 (22.8)	75.3 (24.1)
Mean daily minimum °F (°C)	62.2 (16.8)	62.9 (17.2)	63.8 (17.7)	65.8 (18.8)	67.0 (19.4)	69.1 (20.6)	70.6 (21.4)	71.1 (21.7)	69.5 (20.8)	68.9 (20.5)	66.9 (19.4)	65.1 (18.4)	66.9 (19.4)
Average precipitation inches (mm)	1.84 (47)	1.71 (43)	2.72 (69)	0.80 (20)	1.02 (26)	0.39 (9.9)	0.49 (12)	0.84 (21)	0.76 (19)	1.72 (44)	2.21 (56)	2.56 (65)	17.06 (433)
Average precipitation days (≥ 0.01 inch)	9.5	7.6	9.1	6.7	5.8	5.6	6.5	4.4	5.5	7.2	9.0	9.5	86.4
Source: NOAA

== Demographics ==
Historical population
Census	Pop.	Note	%±
2020	7,825		—
U.S. Decennial Census

As of the census of 2000, there were 4,741 people, 1,178 households, and 1,003 families residing in the CDP. The population density was 4,838.6 inhabitants per square mile (1,868.2/km^{2}). There were 1,274 housing units at an average density of 1,300.2 per square mile (502.0/km^{2}). The racial makeup of the CDP was 3.50% White, 0.30% African American, 0.11% Native American, 70.43% Asian, 4.64% Pacific Islander, 0.76% from other races, and 20.27% from two or more races. 8.80% of the population were Hispanic or Latino of any race.

There were 1,178 households, out of which 39.6% had children under the age of 18 living with them, 63.8% were married couples living together, 12.9% had a female householder with no husband present, and 14.8% were non-families. 11.5% of all households were made up of individuals, and 7.8% had someone living alone who was 65 years of age or older. The average household size was 4.02 and the average family size was 4.33.

In the CDP the population was spread out, with 27.8% under the age of 18, 9.4% from 18 to 24, 30.2% from 25 to 44, 18.8% from 45 to 64, and 13.8% who were 65 years of age or older. The median age was 33 years. For every 100 females, there were 102.0 males. For every 100 females age 18 and over, there were 100.3 males.

The median income for a household in the CDP was $51,451, and the median income for a family was $52,878. Males had a median income of $28,281 versus $21,491 for females. The per capita income for the CDP was $12,883. About 6.7% of families and 8.6% of the population were below the poverty line, including 10.3% of those under the age of 18 and 16.5% of those 65 and older.

== Government and infrastructure ==
The United States Postal Service operates the Ewa Station Post Office in Ewa Villages.

== Education ==
Hawaii Department of Education operates public schools. Ewa Elementary School is in the Ewa Villages CDP.

Lanakila Baptist School's middle and high school division is in the CDP.
