= Kalaeloa, Hawaii =

Census-designated place in Hawaii, United States

Kalaeloa
- Census-designated place
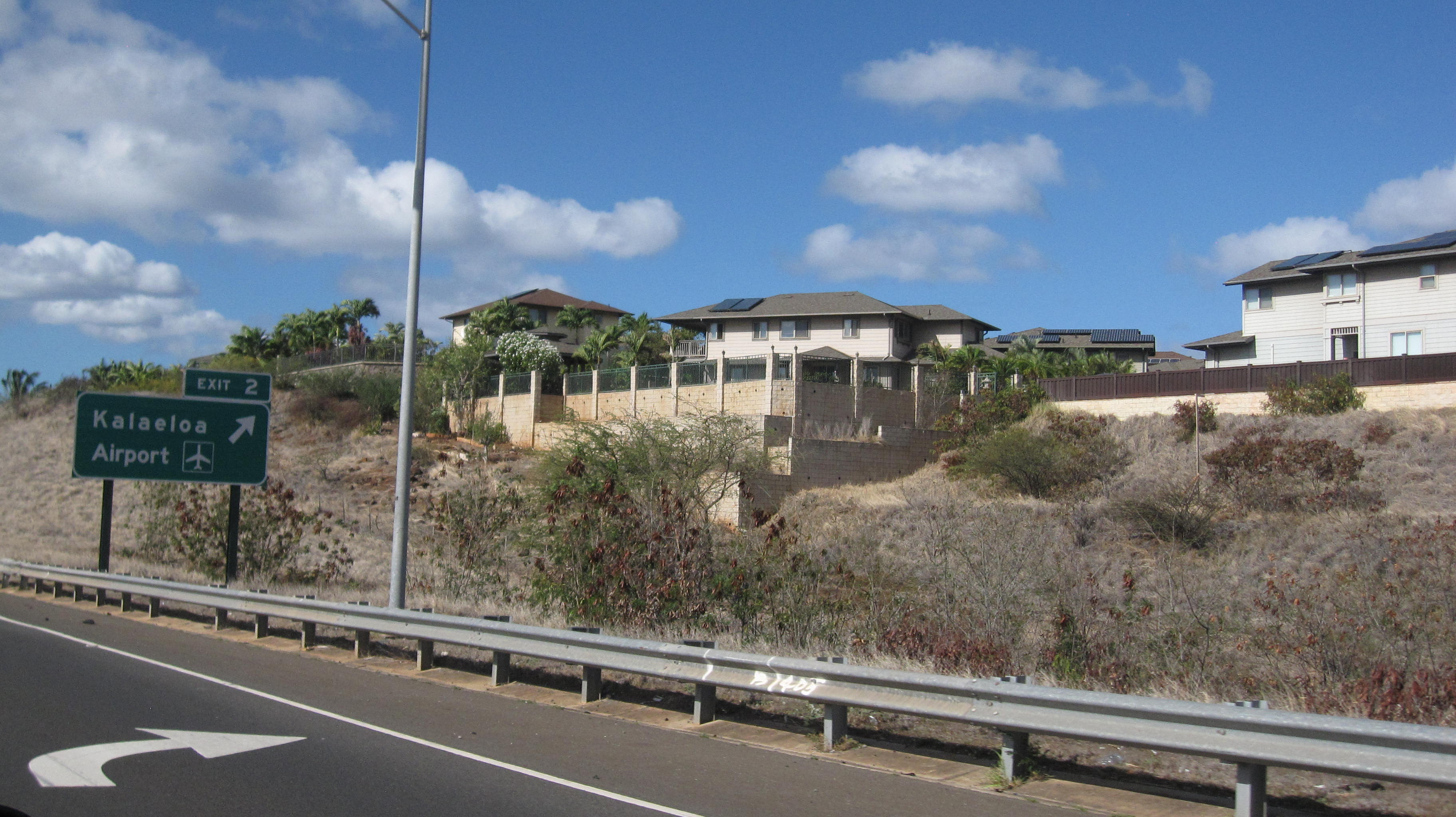
- Interstate H-1 in Kalaeloa

- Location in Honolulu County and the state of Hawaii
- Coordinates: 21°19′28″N 158°04′59″W
- Country: United States
- State: Hawaii
- Counties: Honolulu

Area
  - Total: 6.10 sq mi (15.79 km^{2})
  - Land: 6.10 sq mi (15.79 km^{2})
  - Water: 0 sq mi (0.00 km^{2})
- Elevation: 30 ft (9 m)

Population (2020)
  - Total: 2,364
  - Density: 387.7/sq mi (149.71/km^{2})
- Time zone: UTC−10 (Hawaii–Aleutian)
- ZIP code: 96707
- Area code: 808
- GNIS feature ID: 2627933

Kalaeloa (Hawaiian pronunciation: [kəlɐe̯ˈlowə]) is a census-designated place (CDP) in Honolulu County, Hawaii, United States. The population was 2,364 at the 2020 census. The community occupies the location of the former Naval Air Station Barbers Point, which was closed in 1999 and subsequently transferred to the State of Hawaiʻi. The geographical name, Ka lae loa, means "long point" in Hawaiian and is the native name for what was also called Barbers Point. The English name came from Captain Henry Barber who wrecked his ship on a shoal there on October 31, 1796.

In 1993, after the federal government listed Barbers Point for closure, the state legislature established the Barbers Point Naval Air Station Redevelopment Commission (BPNAS-RC) to guide the redevelopment of the former military facilities comprising John Rodgers airfield and 3,700 acres (15 km^{2}) of land along the south shore of Oʻahu between the towns of ʻEwa, Kapolei, and Campbell Industrial Park. On July 1, 2002, the Hawaii Community Development Authority became the redevelopment authority for Kalaeloa. The former Naval Air Station runways and associated facilities are now Kalaeloa Airport.

Barbers Point Housing is that part of Kalaeloa retained temporarily by the United States Navy for housing.

== Geography ==
Kalaeloa is located at 21°19′28″N 158°04′59″W (21.324550, -158.083156).

=== Climate ===
Tropical savanna climates have monthly mean temperature above 18 °C (64 °F) in every month of the year and typically a pronounced dry season, with the driest month having precipitation less than 60mm (2.36 in) of precipitation.

Climate data for Kalaeloa, Hawaii (Kalaeloa Airport) 1991–2020 normals, extremes 1949–present
Month	Jan	Feb	Mar	Apr	May	Jun	Jul	Aug	Sep	Oct	Nov	Dec	Year
Record high °F (°C)	89 (32)	89 (32)	93 (34)	93 (34)	92 (33)	94 (34)	100 (38)	96 (36)	95 (35)	95 (35)	96 (36)	92 (33)	100 (38)
Mean maximum °F (°C)	84.1 (28.9)	84.4 (29.1)	85.5 (29.7)	87.0 (30.6)	88.1 (31.2)	89.8 (32.1)	91.3 (32.9)	91.6 (33.1)	91.2 (32.9)	90.3 (32.4)	88.0 (31.1)	85.1 (29.5)	92.4 (33.6)
Mean daily maximum °F (°C)	80.9 (27.2)	80.9 (27.2)	81.6 (27.6)	83.6 (28.7)	84.9 (29.4)	87.3 (30.7)	88.0 (31.1)	89.1 (31.7)	88.9 (31.6)	87.3 (30.7)	84.1 (28.9)	82.1 (27.8)	84.9 (29.4)
Daily mean °F (°C)	72.8 (22.7)	73.0 (22.8)	73.8 (23.2)	75.7 (24.3)	76.9 (24.9)	79.3 (26.3)	80.3 (26.8)	81.1 (27.3)	80.7 (27.1)	79.5 (26.4)	76.8 (24.9)	74.5 (23.6)	77.0 (25.0)
Mean daily minimum °F (°C)	64.7 (18.2)	65.1 (18.4)	66.0 (18.9)	67.7 (19.8)	69.0 (20.6)	71.3 (21.8)	72.5 (22.5)	73.1 (22.8)	72.4 (22.4)	71.7 (22.1)	69.4 (20.8)	66.9 (19.4)	69.1 (20.6)
Mean minimum °F (°C)	56.7 (13.7)	57.9 (14.4)	59.0 (15.0)	61.9 (16.6)	63.2 (17.3)	67.0 (19.4)	68.2 (20.1)	68.6 (20.3)	67.3 (19.6)	65.3 (18.5)	63.2 (17.3)	60.5 (15.8)	55.3 (12.9)
Record low °F (°C)	50 (10)	51 (11)	52 (11)	54 (12)	55 (13)	60 (16)	62 (17)	61 (16)	57 (14)	57 (14)	56 (13)	53 (12)	50 (10)
Average precipitation inches (mm)	1.36 (35)	1.79 (45)	1.95 (50)	0.63 (16)	0.97 (25)	0.27 (6.9)	0.29 (7.4)	0.62 (16)	0.67 (17)	1.30 (33)	1.77 (45)	2.29 (58)	13.91 (353)
Average precipitation days (≥ 0.01 in)	7.1	6.5	7.6	5.4	4.8	3.8	3.6	4.1	5.3	5.8	7.0	6.9	67.9
Source: NOAA

== Demographics ==
Historical population
Census	Pop.	Note	%±
2000	67		—
2010	48		−28.4%
2020	2,364		4,825.0%
U.S. Decennial Census

=== 2020 census ===
As of the 2020 census, Kalaeloa had a population of 2,364. The median age was 31.2 years. 22.2% of residents were under the age of 18 and 6.9% of residents were 65 years of age or older. For every 100 females there were 109.8 males, and for every 100 females age 18 and over there were 110.4 males age 18 and over.

96.4% of residents lived in urban areas, while 3.6% lived in rural areas.

There were 693 households in Kalaeloa, of which 32.2% had children under the age of 18 living in them. Of all households, 37.8% were married-couple households, 28.1% were households with a male householder and no spouse or partner present, and 21.4% were households with a female householder and no spouse or partner present. About 30.9% of all households were made up of individuals and 6.5% had someone living alone who was 65 years of age or older.

There were 867 housing units, of which 20.1% were vacant. The homeowner vacancy rate was 0.0% and the rental vacancy rate was 5.6%.

Racial composition as of the 2020 census
Race	Number	Percent
White	602	25.5%
Black or African American	169	7.1%
American Indian and Alaska Native	21	0.9%
Asian	301	12.7%
Native Hawaiian and Other Pacific Islander	492	20.8%
Some other race	84	3.6%
Two or more races	695	29.4%
Hispanic or Latino (of any race)	327	13.8%

=== 2000 census ===
As of the 2000 Census, there were 67 people, 16 households, and 16 families residing in the CDP. The population density was 260.0 inhabitants per square mile (100.4/km^{2}). There were 127 housing units at an average density of 492.9 per square mile (190.3/km^{2}). The racial makeup of the CDP was 88.06% White, 5.97% Asian, 2.99% Pacific Islander, and 2.99% from two or more races. 2.99% of the population were Hispanic or Latino of any race.

There were 16 households, out of which 87.5% had children under the age of 18 living with them, 100.0% were married couples living together, and 0.0% had someone living alone who was 65 years of age or older. The average household size was 4.19 (average family size was also 4.19).

In the CDP the population was spread out, with 50.7% under the age of 18, 1.5% from 18 to 24, 38.8% from 25 to 44, 9.0% from 45 to 64, and none who were 65 years of age or older. The median age was 18 years. For every 100 females, there were 91.4 males. For every 100 females age 18 and over, there were 106.3 males.

The median income for a household in the CDP was $65,625. Males had a median income of $49,531 versus $0 for females. The per capita income for the CDP was $21,083. None of the population was below the poverty line.

== History ==
In October 1795, during a trading voyage to China, the ship, the Arthur arrived in Hawaiʻi led by Captain Henry Barber. He set sail for Kauaʻi after stopping for provisions at Waikiki. After passing the entrance to Pearl Harbor, the Arthur wrecked on a reef in high surf and was completely destroyed. Six crew members drowned, but Barber and the other fifteen members of his crew made it ashore in their small boats. The point where the wreck occurred was known thereafter as Barbers Point.

== Facilities ==
The immediate vicinity of Kalaeloa, which extends over the southwestern tip of the island of Oahu, includes Coast Guard Air Station Barbers Point, Barbers Point Lighthouse, Kalaeloa Airport, Campbell Industrial Park, including AES Hawaii Power Plant, Hawaii Refinery owned by Par Petroleum Corporation to the southwest and the Barbers Point Harbor. Remnants of the old base remain, such as the streets named after aircraft carriers (i.e. Yorktown, Lexington, etc.), chapels, a post office, and the Navy Exchange which reopened as an indoor go-cart track in January 2011.

In 2017, the state of Hawaii under the Kalaeloa Authority within the Hawaii Community Development Authority (HCDA) rejected a plan (Note: The vote was seven against and two for.) to allow SunStrong II LLC to lease 19 acres and build a 5-megawatt photovoltaic solar farm north of the Kalaeloa Heritage Park. Aloha Solar Energy Fund II is leasing 24 acres of HCDA land near the Kalaeloa Airport to build a 5-megawatt photovoltaic solar farm. The United States Navy supplies power to Kalaeloa. SunStrong II's project included a 12-kilovolt line extension to Hawaiian Electric Co.'s (HECO) grid which would have allowed HECO an opportunity to provide power to the Kalaeloa district.

=== Kalealoa hybrid reef project ===
The hybrid reef project combines materials science with biology to protect Hawaii shorelines from wave damage, erosion, and severe storms. The project creates a living breakwater designed to reduce wave energy while improving habitat. It involves 60 porous concrete reef- mimicking structures that dissipate wave energy while allowing water to flow across the reef. Coral modules attached to the structures support the recruitment and growth of native corals while biomaterials repel competing algae and accelerate coral growth.

The project site exploits a rock bottom south of Kalaeloa Harbor. Minimal coral inhabits in the project site., The first step is to remove coral fragments and preserve live coral on growing tables. Next is to intall reef structures, attach live coral fragments to the structures, and monitor performance. The deployment followed four years of research.

The Kalaeloa Hybrid Reef is planned to serve as a living laboratory for nature-based coastal engineering, which integrates engineered infrastructure with natural ecosystems.

Partners include University of California San Diego, and Scripps Institution of Oceanography, Florida Atlantic University, and Ohio State University.

==== Design ====
- Engineered reef structures: The foundation relies on concrete reef structures. In large-scale wave-flume tests, these breakwaters reduced wave energy by more than 80% while remaining stable during extreme conditions.
- 3D-printed coral habitat: the modules feature spiral-shaped shelters called “helix recesses". Kāneʻohe Bay experiments reported that crevices yielded an 80-fold increase in coral settlement and up to a 50-fold increase in survival rates compared to flat surfaces.
- Biomaterials: Novel materials reduce algae competition while allowing coral to grow.
- Acoustic Enrichment: Researchers at UCSD-SIO recorded sounds of healthy reefs to be broadcast near the breakwater to attract algae-grazing fish.
- Low-impact deployment: A shallow-water catamaran eliminates the need for disruptive crane barges. Structures will be anchored using a rotary micropiling system, which significantly reduces the anchoring footprint and sound pollution.

== Education ==
Hawaii Department of Education operates Barbers Point Elementary School in Kalaeloa CDP.
