= Adrian Tam =

American politician

- 譚家昇
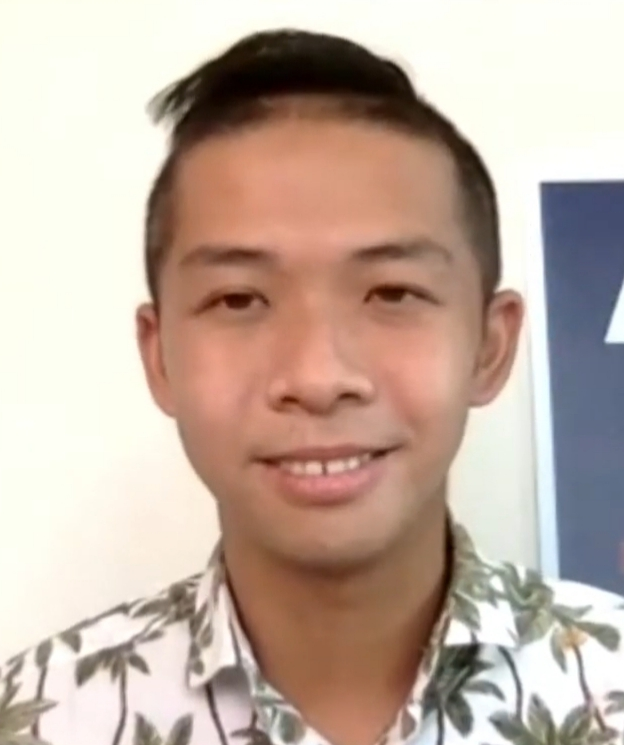
- Tam in 2020

Member of the Hawaii House of Representatives from the 24th district
- Incumbent
- Assumed office November 3, 2020
- Preceded by: Tom Brower

Chair of the Democratic Party of Hawaii
- In office December 2, 2023 – May 19, 2024
- Preceded by: Donna Domingo (acting)
- Succeeded by: Derek Turbin

Personal details
- Born: September 11, 1992 (age 34) Honolulu, Hawaii, U.S.
- Party: Democratic
- Education: Pennsylvania State University (BA)

Adrian Kar-Tsing Tam (Chinese: 譚家昇; Jyutping: Taam^{4} Gaa^{1} Sing^{1}; born September 11, 1992) is an American politician serving as a member of the Hawaii House of Representatives. A member of the Democratic Party, he previously served as the interim Chair of the Democratic Party of Hawaii.

== Early life ==
Tam is a second-generation Asian American of Taiwanese ancestry. His father had served as an assistant to a draftsman, and his mother worked in sales. Following graduation from Kalani High School, he graduated with a degree in history from Pennsylvania State University, and upon returning to Hawaii, began working for his family's real estate company.

== Political career ==
Tam worked in the Hawaii Senate for Senator Stanley Chang before running for public office in 2020. He defeated incumbent Tom Brower in the Democratic Party primary election, then won the general election for the 22nd district of the Hawaii House of Representatives against Republican Party candidate Nicholas Ochs, who previously served as the vice chairman of Donald Trump's Hawaii campaign in the 2016 United States elections, had strong support from Roger Stone and drew media attention for founding the Hawaii chapter of the Proud Boys. After Tam was seated, he became the only openly gay member of the Hawaii State Legislature. (Note: During the 2020 United States elections, the Proud Boys were supported by Iranian cyber actors according to the United States National Intelligence Council (NIC).)

Following the 2021 storming of the United States Capitol, Tam and other Hawaii lawmakers signed a letter requesting rioters to be placed on the federal No Fly List. (Note: After returning from the failed January 6, 2021 Putsch, Nick Ochs was arrested on the evening of January 7, 2021 at the Daniel K. Inouye International Airport in Honolulu for his participation in the 2021 storming of the United States Capitol. He retained both Myles Breiner in Honolulu and the Washington DC attorney Edward MacMahon, Jr. and entered a not guilty plea on February 12, 2021. Previously, Edward MacMahon, Jr. represented Zacarias Moussaoui, who was a 9/11 hijacker. MacMahon was involved in the proceedings during the Iran–Contra affair as well.)

Tam is a member of the Progressive Legislative Caucus.

In December 2023, Tam was elected interim Chair of the Democratic Party of Hawaii by the State Central Committee. His term ended on May 19, 2024, and was succeeded by Derek Turbin.

In 2024, Tam was named the Chair of the House Committee on Tourism. In 2025, him and Senator Lynn DeCoite passed SB 1571, a bill that downgraded the Hawaii Tourism Authority governing board to an advisory board following public distrust and mismanagement over the agency.

== Personal life ==
Tam lives with his dog, Winston.

== Awards and honors ==
In June 2021, Queerty named Tam one of its "Pride50" people "who made a positive impact in the last year and who are helping to lead the nation toward equality, acceptance, and dignity for all queer people".

== Electoral history ==
Hawaii's 22nd House District Democratic primary, 2020
Party	Candidate	Votes	%
Democratic	Adrian Tam	1,964	51.9
Democratic	Tom Brower (incumbent)	1,820	48.1
Total votes		3,784	100.0

Hawaii's 22nd House District General Election, 2020
Party	Candidate	Votes	%
Democratic	Adrian Tam	6,080	67.9
Republican	Nicholas Ochs	2,869	32.1
Total votes		8,949	100.0
Democratic hold			

== Notes ==
Party political offices
Preceded by Donna Domingo; Acting	Chair of the Democratic Party of Hawaii; Acting; 2023–2024	Succeeded by Derek Turbin
