= Nick Quested =

British filmmaker (born 1969)

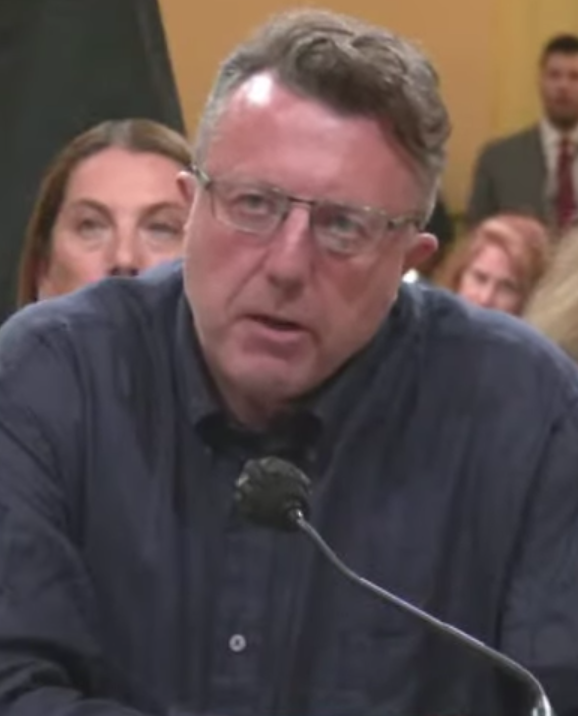
- Quested testifying before the January 6 committee on 9 June 2022
- Born: 26 November 1969 (age 56)
- Occupation: Filmmaker

Nicholas Quested (born 26 November 1969) is a British filmmaker and producer of documentary films, music videos, and TV commercials. He is the executive director and owner of Goldcrest Films.

Quested has produced over 40 documentary films, including several war documentaries directed by Sebastian Junger. Prior to producing, he was an award-winning music video director. Quested directed more than 100 music videos and commercials, working with artists including Dr. Dre, Jay-Z, Nas, E-17, P. Diddy, Cuban Link and Sting and brands including Sprite, Nike, Lexus, and Land Rover.

He has won two Emmys and a DuPont–Columbia Award, and has been nominated for an Oscar and a PGA Award. His company, Goldcrest Films, has won the Academy Award for Best Picture twice.

Leading up to and during the 2021 United States Capitol attack, Quested had been embedded with the Proud Boys, a far-right organization involved in the attack. On 9 June 2022 Quested testified under subpoena on live television to the US House of Representatives January 6 committee. As part of his testimony, Quested revealed that his crew had filmed a garage meeting between Proud Boys leader Enrique Tarrio and Oath Keepers founder and leader Stewart Rhodes on 5 January 2021, the night before the attack.

== Filmography ==
=== As producer ===
- Restrepo (2010)
- Pussy Riot: A Punk Prayer (2010)
- Korengal (2014)
- The Last Patrol
- Which Way is the Front Line From Here? The Life and Time of Tim Hetherington

=== As director ===
- Hell on Earth: The Fall of Syria and the Rise of ISIS (2018)
- Blood on the Wall (2020)
