= Derek Turbin =

American politician

Member of the Hawaii House of Representatives from the 21st district
- Incumbent
- Assumed office November 3, 2026
- Preceded by: Jackson Sayama

Personal details
- Born: 1983 or 1984 (age 42–43) Honolulu, Hawaii, U.S.
- Party: Democratic
- Education: Occidental College (BA); University of San Francisco (JD)

Derek Andrew Turbin is an American politician. A member of the Democratic Party, Turbin represents the 21st district of the Hawaii House of Representatives since 2026. He previously served as the Chair of the Democratic Party of Hawaii.

== Early life and education ==
Turbin was born in Honolulu, Hawaii, to attorneys Richard Turbin and Rai Saint Chu. He is half-Chinese and half-white. He graduated from Punahou School in 2002.

Turbin attended Occidental College, where he competed in football and track and field for the Occidental Tigers. He won the Roy Denney Award, given to school's top senior student-athlete. After graduation, Turbin played pro football in Finland for the Sea City Storm. He studied law at University of San Francisco School of Law, graduating in 2012.

== Career ==
Turbin began his career as a teacher at Saint Louis School in Honolulu in 2007. Between 2007 and 2009, he served as the associate head track and field coach at Occidental College in Los Angeles, California. Turbin also briefly worked as a model.

Following his legal education, Turbin practiced as an associate attorney from 2013 to 2018. In 2019, he served as a staff attorney for the Committee on Judiciary in the Hawaii House of Representatives. Later that year, he joined the law firm Gilson Daub as founding partner and managing attorney of its Hawaii office.

=== Political career ===
From 2024 to 2026, Turbin served as the chair of the Democratic Party of Hawaiʻi.

Turbin was elected to the Hawaii House of Representatives in 2026 to represent District 21. He previously ran in the 2020 Hawaii House of Representatives election for District 20, losing the Democratic nomination to Jackson Sayama.

Party political offices
Preceded by Adrian Tam (Interim)	Chair of the Hawaii Democratic Party; 2024–2026	Succeeded by Makai Freitas
