= Jackson Sayama =

American politician (born 1997)

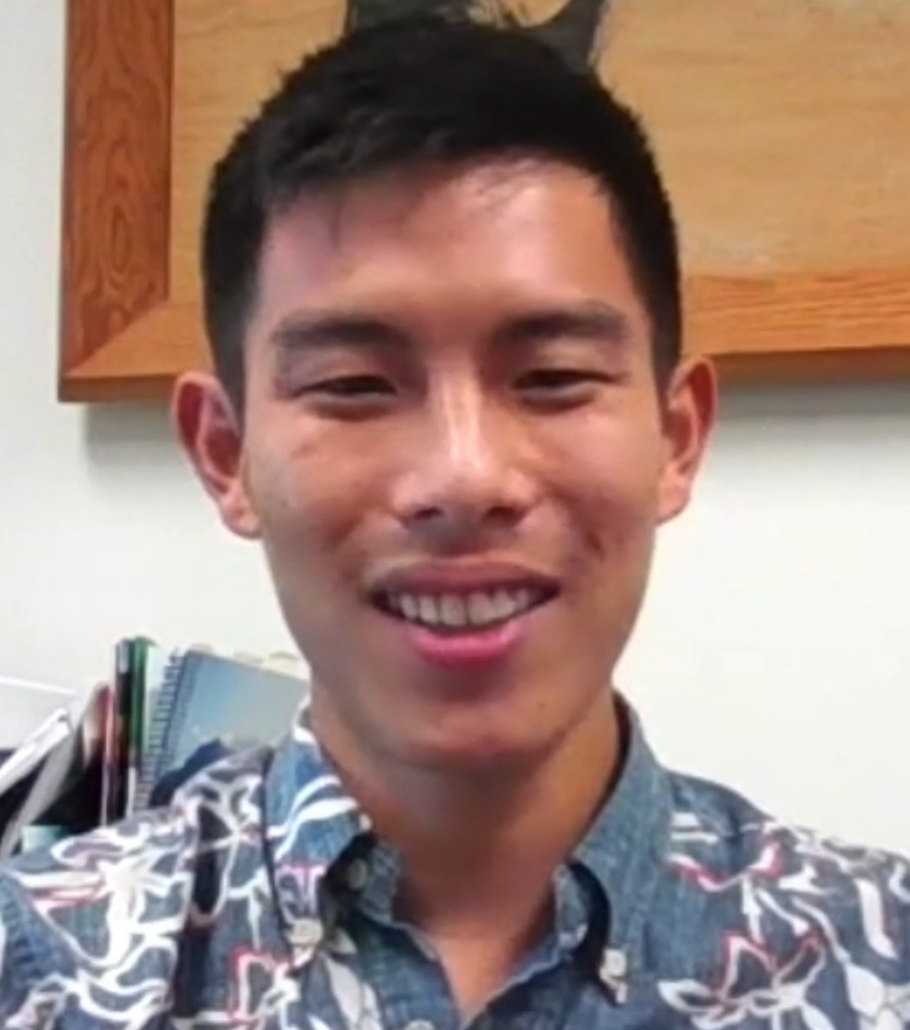
- Sayama in 2021

Member of the Hawaii Senate from the 10th district
- Incumbent
- Assumed office November 3, 2026
- Preceded by: Les Ihara Jr.

Member of the Hawaii House of Representatives
- In office November 3, 2020 – November 3, 2026
- Preceded by: Calvin Say
- Succeeded by: Derek Turbin
- Constituency: 20th district (2020–2022); 21st district (2022–present)

Personal details
- Born: 1997 (age 28–29) Honolulu, Hawaii, U.S.
- Party: Democratic
- Education: New York University Shanghai

Jackson Doshin Sayama (born 1997) is an American politician serving as a Democratic member of the Hawaii Senate since November 2026, representing the 10th district, which includes portions of Kaimukī, Pālolo Valley, St. Louis Heights, Maunalani Heights, Kapahulu, and Mōʻiliʻili on Oʻahu.

Sayama won his seat after successfully challenging longtime incumbent senator Les Ihara Jr. in the 2026 Hawaii Senate election. Following the 2026 legislative elections, he was selected by the Senate Majority caucus to serve as Assistant Majority Whip for the 34th Legislature.

He previously served in the Hawaii House of Representatives from 2020 to 2026, representing the 20th district from 2020 to 2022 and the 21st district from 2022 to 2026. When he was first elected at the age of 23, he was the second youngest-ever member of the state House of Representatives, after Tulsi Gabbard who was elected at the age of 21 in 2002.

== Early life and education ==
Sayama was born and raised in St. Louis Heights, a neighborhood of Honolulu, Hawaii. A fourth-generation Japanese-American, Sayama attended the Punahou School, graduating in 2015. Sayama attended New York University Shanghai, graduating in 2019 with a degree in Chinese Global Studies. He is currently attending the University of Hawaiʻi, where he intends to get a Master of Public Administration degree.

== Political career ==
Sayama won the 21st district seat of the Hawaii House of Representatives after longtime incumbent Democrat Calvin Say retired to run for Honolulu City Council. He won the election in 2020 against Republican candidate Julia Allen, 74.6% to 25.4%.

In 2026, Sayama ran for the 10th district of the Hawaii State Senate and won, defeating incumbent Les Ihara Jr., the longest-serving state lawmaker at the time.

== Personal life ==
Sayama's parents work at Daihonzan Chozen-ji, a Zen Buddhist temple and martial arts dojo in Kalihi Valley known for convening public and business leaders.

== Electoral history ==
Hawaii 20th State Representative District Democratic Primary, 2020
| Party | Candidate | Votes | % |
|---|---|---|---|
| Democratic | Jackson Sayama | 2,511 | 32.32 |
| Democratic | Derek Turbin | 2,328 | 29.97 |
| Democratic | Rebecca P. "Becky" Gardner | 1,991 | 25.63 |
| Democratic | Jay I. Ishibashi | 939 | 12.09 |
| Total votes | | 7,769 | 100.0 |

Hawaii 20th State Representative District General Election, 2020
| Party | Candidate | Votes | % |
|---|---|---|---|
| Democratic | Jackson Sayama | 9,235 | 74.64 |
| Republican | Julia E. Allen | 3,138 | 25.36 |
| Total votes | | 12,373 | 100.0 |

Hawaii 21st State Representative District Democratic Primary, 2022
| Party | Candidate | Votes | % |
|---|---|---|---|
| Democratic | Jackson Sayama (incumbent) | 5,271 | 100.0 |
| Total votes | | 5,271 | 100.0 |

Hawaii 21st State Representative District General Election, 2022
| Party | Candidate | Votes | % |
|---|---|---|---|
| Democratic | Jackson Sayama (incumbent) | 6,571 | 73.98 |
| Republican | Julia E. Allen | 2,311 | 26.02 |
| Total votes | | 8,882 | 100.0 |

Hawaii 21st State Representative District Democratic Primary, 2024
| Party | Candidate | Votes | % |
|---|---|---|---|
| Democratic | Jackson Sayama (incumbent) | 3,952 | 100.0 |
| Total votes | | 3,952 | 100.0 |

Hawaii 21st State Representative District General Election, 2024
| Party | Candidate | Votes | % |
|---|---|---|---|
| Democratic | Jackson Sayama (incumbent) | 8,121 | 76.5 |
| Republican | Joelle Seashell | 2,491 | 23.5 |
| Total votes | | 10,620 | 100.0 |

Hawaii 10th State Senate District Democratic Primary, 2026
| Party | Candidate | Votes | % |
|---|---|---|---|
| Democratic | Jackson Sayama | 5,454 | 66.2 |
| Democratic | Les Ihara Jr. (incumbent) | 2,781 | 33.8 |
| Total votes | | 8,235 | 100.0 |
