= E17 =

E17 or E-17 may refer to:

- Queen's Indian Defence, Encyclopaedia of Chess Openings code
- European route E17, a road through Belgium and eastern France
- East 17, a British pop group, also known as E17
- Enlightenment (X window manager) release 17
- E17, a postcode district in the E postcode area for east London
- Ever 17: The Out of Infinity, a Japanese video game
- E17 screw, a type of Edison lightbulb screw
- HMS E17, a British submarine of World War I
- Kan-etsu Expressway, route E17 in Japan
- Butterworth Outer Ring Road, route E17 in Malaysia
