= Nicholas Ochs =

American convicted felon

- Born: 1985 or 1986 (age 39–40)
- Education: University of Hawaiʻi
- Employer: United States Marine Corps
- Organization: Proud Boys
- Known for: Participation in the January 6 United States Capitol attack
- Political party: Republican
- Conviction: Obstructing an official proceeding (18 U.S.C. § 1512)
- Penalty: 4 years imprisonment

Nicholas Ochs (born 1985 or 1986), sometimes Nick Ochs, is a former U.S. Marine, a 2020 Republican Hawaii House of Representatives candidate and the founder of the Proud Boys' Hawaii chapter.

After taking part in January 6 United States Capitol attack, he pleaded guilty to obstructing a federal proceeding and was sentenced to four years in prison. He was pardoned on January 20, 2025, by Donald Trump.

== Education ==
Ochs attended the University of Hawaiʻi.

== Career ==
Ochs has worked as a U.S. Marine, based in Hawaii.

== Politics ==
In November 2020, Ochs ran as a Republican candidate to represent the Waikiki neighborhood in the Hawaii House of Representatives. He won the primary but lost the general election to Democratic candidate Adrian Tam. During the election, Ochs's campaign page was removed from Facebook for breaching the company's terms of service. Ochs won 29.7% of the vote, Tam won 63%. Ochs's campaign was endorsed by Roger Stone.

== Capitol attack ==
Ochs is a high ranking "elder" of the Proud Boys right wing extremist organization. In 2021 during the January 6 United States Capitol attack, Ochs threw smoke bombs at police officers and trespassed into the United States Capitol where he smoked cigarettes. The same day, he posted a photograph in front of the words "Murder the Media".

Ochs was taken into custody on January 7, 2021. On February 3, 2021, he was indicted by a federal grand jury of the District of Columbia for conspiracy to obstruct the United States Congress.

In September 2022, Ochs pleaded guilty to obstructing a federal proceeding in a joint prosecution with Nicolas DeCarlo. During his court appearance, Ochs claimed he was a journalist. In December 2022, he was fined $5,000 and sentenced to four years in prison and three years of supervised release. In November 2024, his conviction was vacated following the Supreme Court's decision in Fischer v. United States, and he was released pending a new trial. On January 16, 2025, he and co-defendant Nicholas DeCarlo were re-indicted on nine counts in the United States District Court for the District of Columbia. He was pardoned on January 20, 2025, by Donald Trump.

== Personal life ==
He is married and lived in Honolulu, Hawaii. In 2016, he and his wife appeared in an episode of Divorce Court.

== See also ==
- List of cases of the January 6 United States Capitol attack (M-S)
- Criminal proceedings in the January 6 United States Capitol attack
- List of people granted executive clemency in the second Trump presidency
