= HMS E17 =

Submarine of the Royal Navy

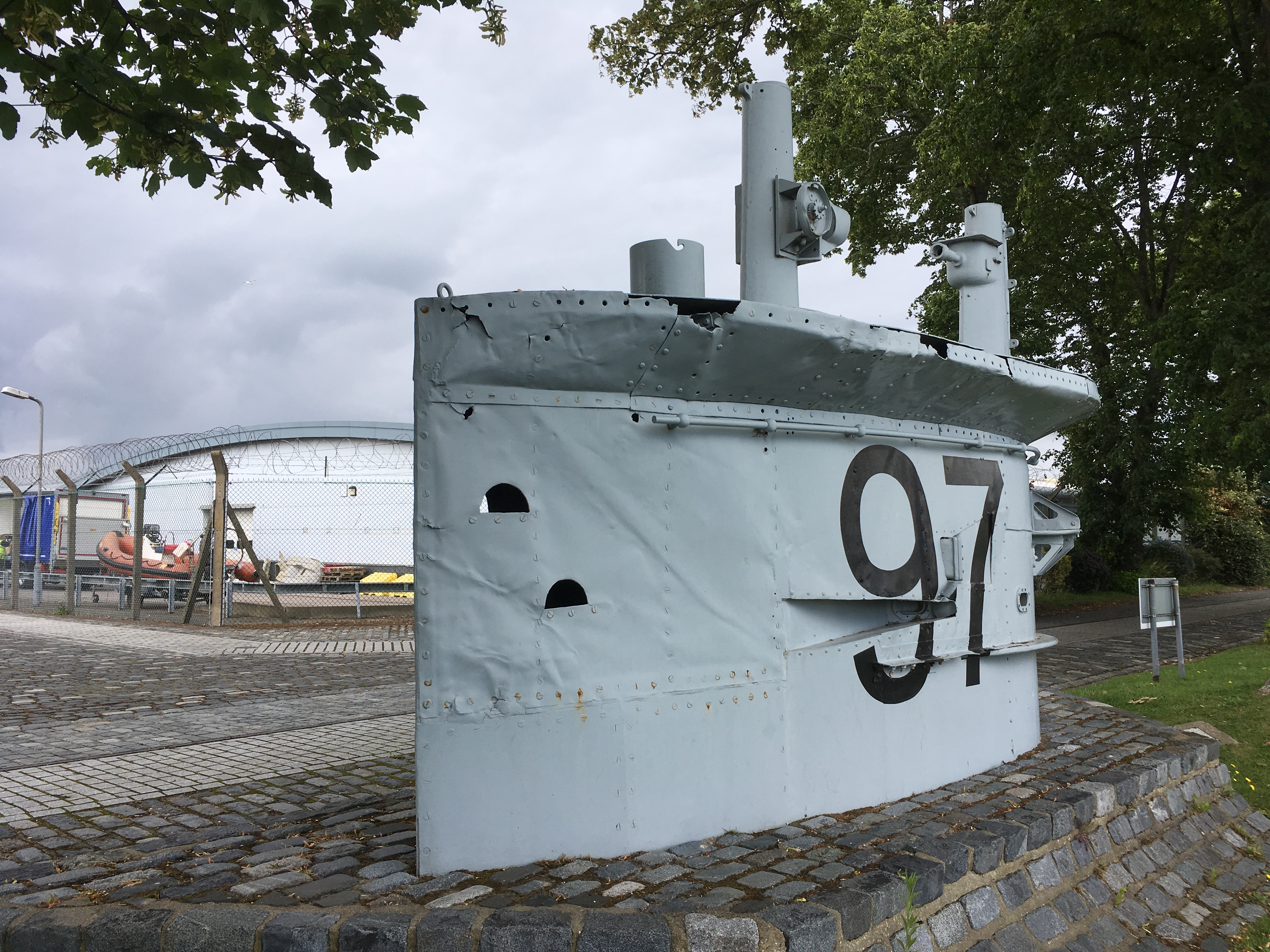
- The conning tower of E17

History

United Kingdom
- Name: E17
- Builder: Vickers, Barrow
- Laid down: 29 July 1914
- Launched: 16 January 1915
- Commissioned: 7 April 1915
- Fate: Wrecked, 6 January 1916

General characteristics
- Class & type: E-class submarine
- Displacement: 662 long tons (673 t) surfaced; 807 long tons (820 t) submerged
- Length: 181 ft (55 m)
- Beam: 15 ft (4.6 m)
- Propulsion: 2 × 800 hp (597 kW) diesels; 2 × 420 hp (313 kW) electric; 2 screws
- Speed: 15.25 knots (28.24 km/h; 17.55 mph) surfaced; 10.25 knots (18.98 km/h; 11.80 mph) submerged
- Range: 3,000 nmi (5,600 km) at 10 kn (19 km/h; 12 mph); 65 nmi (120 km) at 5 kn (9.3 km/h; 5.8 mph)
- Complement: 31
- Armament: 5 × 18-inch (450 mm) torpedo tubes (2 bow, 2 beam, 1 stern); 1 × 12-pounder gun

HMS E17 was a British E-class submarine built by Vickers, Barrow-in-Furness. She was laid down on 29 July 1914, launched on 16 January 1915 and was commissioned on 7 April 1915. HMS E17 was wrecked off Texel in the North Sea on 6 January 1916. Her crew were rescued by a Dutch cruiser Noordbrabant. They were interned. The conning tower of E17 is preserved as a monument at the Royal Navy Submarine Museum in Gosport, the United Kingdom.

== Design ==
Like all post-E8 British E-class submarines, E17 had a displacement of 662 long tons (673 t) at the surface and 807 long tons (820 t) while submerged. She had a total length of 180 feet (55 m) and a beam of 22 feet 8.5 inches (6.922 m). She was powered by two 800 horsepower (600 kW) Vickers eight-cylinder two-stroke diesel engines and two 420 horsepower (310 kW) electric motors. The submarine had a maximum surface speed of 16 knots (30 km/h; 18 mph) and a submerged speed of 10 knots (19 km/h; 12 mph). British E-class submarines had fuel capacities of 50 long tons (51 t) of diesel and ranges of 3,255 miles (5,238 km; 2,829 nmi) when travelling at 10 knots (19 km/h; 12 mph). E17 was capable of operating submerged for five hours when travelling at 5 knots (9.3 km/h; 5.8 mph).

As with most of the early E-class boats, E17 was not fitted with a deck gun during construction, but probably had one fitted later forward of the conning tower. She had five 18-inch (450 mm) torpedo tubes, two in the bow, one either side amidships, and one in the stern; a total of 10 torpedoes were carried.

E-class submarines had wireless systems with 1 kilowatt (1.3 hp) power ratings; in some submarines, these were later upgraded to 3 kilowatts (4.0 hp) systems by removing a midship torpedo tube. Their maximum design depth was 100 feet (30 m) although in service some reached depths of below 200 feet (61 m). Some submarines contained Fessenden oscillator systems.

Her complement was three officers and 28 men.
