= Proud Boys =

American neo-fascist organization

- Founder: Gavin McInnes
- Leader: Enrique Tarrio
- Founded: September 2016; 10 years ago
- Allegiance: Donald Trump
- Active regions: United States (active); Canada (dissolved May 2021)
- Ideology: Ideology: Anti-communism; Anti-feminism; Anti-immigration; Anti-liberalism/progressivism; Homophobia; Crypto-fascism; Islamophobia; Neo-fascism; Trumpism; Western chauvinism; Factions: White supremacy; Antisemitism; Neo-Nazism; QAnon
- Political position: Far-right
- Status: Active

The Proud Boys is an American far-right, neo-fascist militant organization that promotes and engages in political violence. The group's leaders have been convicted of violently opposing the federal government of the United States, including its constitutionally prescribed transfer of presidential power. It has been called a street gang and was designated as a terrorist group in Canada and New Zealand. The Proud Boys are opposed to left-wing and progressive groups and support President Donald Trump. While Proud Boys leadership has denied being a white supremacist organization, the group and some of its members have been connected to white supremacist events, ideologies, and other white-power groups throughout its existence.

The group originated in the far-right Taki's Magazine in 2016 under the leadership of the Vice Media co-founder and the former commentator Gavin McInnes, taking its name from the song "Proud of Your Boy" from the Walt Disney Company's musical Aladdin from 2011. Although the Proud Boys emerged as part of the alt-right, McInnes distanced himself from the movement in early 2017, saying the Proud Boys were alt-lite while the alt-right's focus was on race. Donald Trump's comment, "Proud Boys, stand back and stand by", during a presidential debate in September 2020 prior to the 2020 U.S. presidential election was credited with increasing interest and recruitment. After the remark caused an outcry for its apparent endorsement, Trump condemned the Proud Boys while saying he did not "know much about" them.

According to the International Centre for Counter-Terrorism the group believes that traditional masculinity and Western culture are under siege, using "Western chauvinism" as euphemism for the white genocide conspiracy theory. Members have participated in overtly racist events and events centered around fascist, anti-left, and anti-socialist violence. The Southern Poverty Law Center (SPLC) has called the group an "alt-right fight club" and a hate group that uses rhetorical devices to obscure its motives. The Anti-Defamation League (ADL) described the Proud Boys as "extremist conservative" and "alt lite", "overtly Islamophobic and misogynistic", "transphobic and anti-immigration", "all too willing to embrace racists, antisemites and bigots of all kinds", and cites the group's promotion and use of violence as a core tactic.

The group has been banned from multiple social networks, including Facebook, Instagram, Twitter, and YouTube. In February 2021 the U.S. Department of Justice announced the indictment of members for conspiracy related to the 2021 United States Capitol attack, and the Canadian arm of the group folded after being designated a terrorist organization.

As of February 3, 2025, the trademarked name of Proud Boys Intl., LLC is owned by Metropolitan African Methodist Episcopal Church. A court awarded this property to the church to satisfy its judgment regarding the Proud Boys' 2020 vandalization of a Black Lives Matter banner.

== History and organization ==
Gavin McInnes co-founded Vice magazine in 1994, but was pushed out in 2008 due to "creative differences". After leaving, he began "doggedly hacking a jagged but unrelenting path to the far-right fringes of American culture", according to a 2017 profile in the Canadian Globe and Mail. The Proud Boys organization was launched in September 2016, on the website of Taki's Magazine, a far-right publication for which white nationalist Richard B. Spencer had once served as executive editor. It existed informally before then as a group centered around McInnes, and the first gathering of the Brooklyn chapter in July 2016 resulted in a brawl in the bar where they met.

The name is derived from the song "Proud of Your Boy", originally created for Disney's 1992 film Aladdin but left out following story changes in production; it was later featured in the 2011 musical adaptation. In the song, the character Aladdin apologizes to his mother for being a bad son and promises to make her proud. McInnes interprets it as Aladdin apologizing for being a boy. He first heard it while attending his daughter's school music recital. The song's "fake, humble, and self-serving" lyrics became a running theme on his podcast. McInnes said it was the most annoying song in the world but that he could not get enough of it.

The organization has been described as a hate group by the Southern Poverty Law Center (SPLC) and NPR's The Takeaway. Criminologists have pointed to the Proud Boys initiation ceremonies, involvement in criminal and violent behavior, identifying apparel and tattoos, and other characteristics as consistent with street gangs. Spencer, McInnes and the Proud Boys have been described as hipster racists by Vox and Media Matters for America. McInnes says victim mentality of women and other historically oppressed groups is unhealthy, arguing that "[t]here is an incentive to be a victim. It is cool to be a victim." He sees white men and Western culture as "under siege" and described criticism of his ideas as victim blaming. According to the International Centre for Counter-Terrorism, their views have elements of the white genocide conspiracy theory. According to the ADL, the group is part of the alt-lite and is "overtly Islamophobic". The ADL reports that "[i]deologically, members subscribe to a scattershot array of libertarian and nationalist tropes, referring to themselves as anti-communist and anti-political correctness, but in favor of free speech and free markets." In October 2019, members of the Denver chapter of the Proud Boys marched with members of the Patriot Front and former members of the neo-Nazi Traditionalist Worker Party. According to the ADL, "[t]hese relationships show the Proud Boys to be less a pro-western drinking club and more an extreme, right-wing gang." In early 2017, McInnes began to distance himself from the alt-right, saying their focus is race and his focus is what he calls "Western values". This rebranding effort intensified after the Unite the Right Rally. In 2018, McInnes said the Proud Boys were part of the "new right".

The organization glorifies political violence against antifa and leftists, re-enacting political assassinations, and wearing shirts that praise Augusto Pinochet's murders of leftists. In April 2016, McInnes, who believes violence is "a really effective way to solve problems", has said: "I want violence, I want punching in the face. I'm disappointed in Trump supporters for not punching enough." In August 2017, he further stated that "[w]e don't start fights [...] but we will finish them." Heidi Beirich, the Intelligence Project director for the SPLC, said that this form of intentional aggression was not common among far-right groups in the past. She further said the far-right's claim that "[w]e're going to show up and we're intending to get in fights" was new. In 2018, it was reported, based on an internal memo of the Sheriff's Office in Clark County, Washington, that the FBI had classified the Proud Boys as an extremist group with ties to white nationalism. Two weeks later, the Special Agent in Charge of the FBI's Oregon office clarified that the FBI did not mean to designate the entire group, only a number of members of the group, ascribing the error to miscommunication. During the conference, the FBI recommended referring to classifications about the group by the SPLC and other outside agencies.

The organization is opposed to feminism and promotes gender stereotypes in which women are subservient to men. The organization has a female-member-only auxiliary wing named "Proud Boys' Girls" that supports the same ideology. The ADL states that the Proud Boys are an "extremist conservative group". According to the ADL, McInnes and the Proud Boys are misogynistic, depicting women as "lazy" and "less ambitious" than men, and "venerate the housewife". McInnes has called for "enforced monogamy" and criticized feminism as "a cancer". Some men who are not white, including Enrique Tarrio, the group's former chairman and the Florida State Director of Latinos for Trump, have joined the Proud Boys, drawn by the organization's advocacy for men, anti-immigrant stance, and embrace of violence. The Proud Boys claim to condemn racism, with Tarrio stating that the group has "longstanding regulations prohibiting racist, white supremacist or violent activity". However, the ADL has deemed that the group has an ideology of anti-Semitism, Islamophobia, racism, misogyny, transphobia and anti-immigrant sentiment with the group known to threaten, intimidate or violently assault anti-racism protesters. The group has claimed there is an "inherent superiority of the West", going to great lengths to mask members' connections to white supremacy. The ADL states that the Proud Boys' "extreme, provocative tactics—coupled with overt or implicit racism, Islamophobia, anti-Semitism and misogyny and the fact that the group is so decentralized, inconsistent, and spread out—suggest the group should be a significant cause for concern".

The Proud Boys have been banned by social media platforms Facebook, Instagram, Twitter and YouTube. In August 2018, Twitter terminated the official account for the group along with McInnes' account under its policy prohibiting violent extremist groups. At the time, the group's profile photo showed a member punching a counter-protester. Facebook and Instagram banned the group and McInnes in October 2018. That same year, YouTube banned the Proud Boys founder for copyright violation in December 2018. On June 16, 2020, Facebook announced it had removed 358 accounts from its platform and 172 from Instagram that held ties to the organization.

=== Membership and doctrine ===
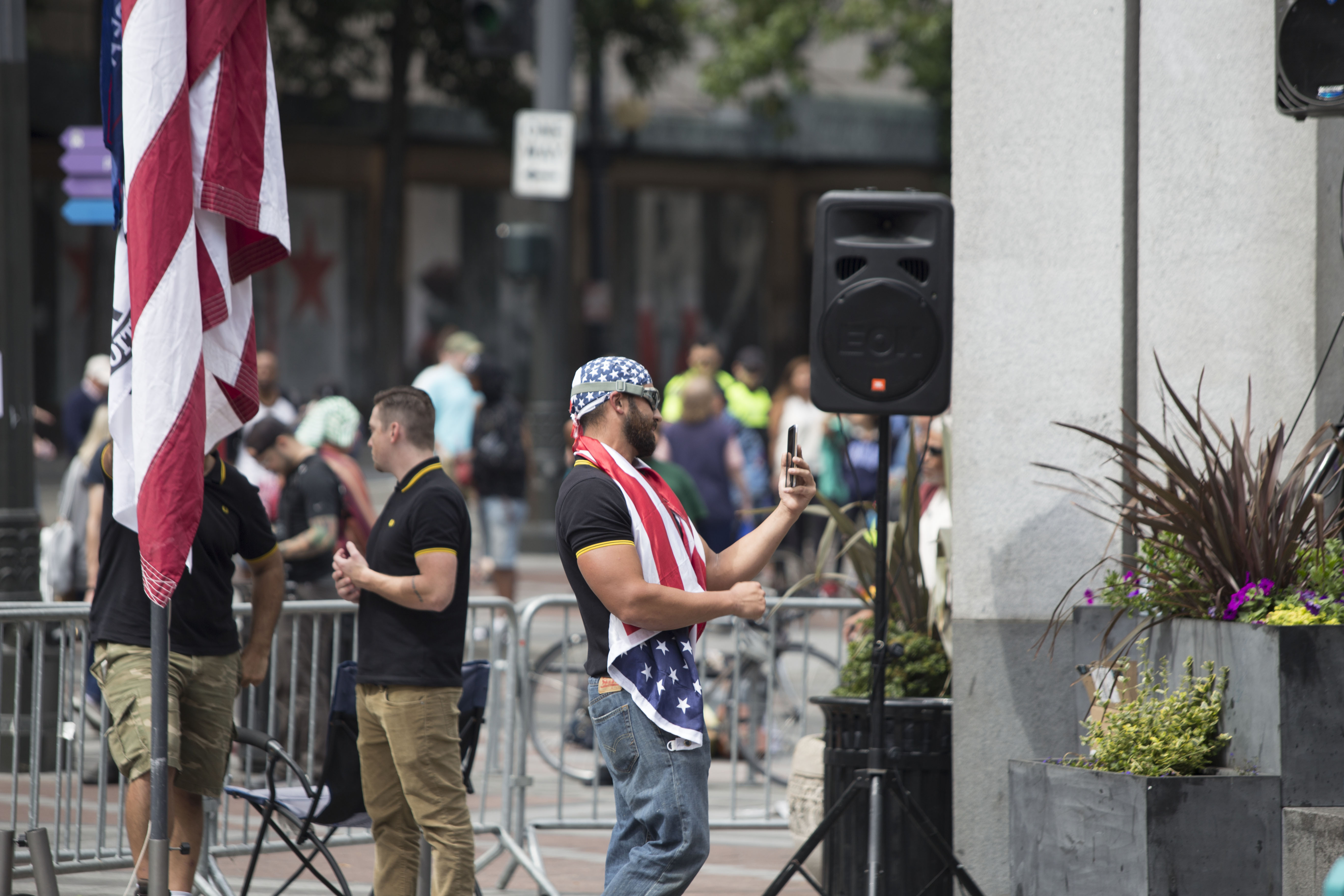
Proud Boys stand next to Joey Gibson at an August 2017 rally in Seattle.

The total number of Proud Boys members is unknown. Reports estimate membership between several hundred up to 6,000. In July 2018, the Proud Boys L.A. branch had 160 members and up to 300 pending applicants, according to the unidentified Proud Boys L.A. president.

Political ideologies and positions that the Proud Boys adhere to include anti-communism, anti-feminism, anti-immigration, anti-LGBT rights, antisemitism, authoritarianism, chauvinism, crypto-fascism, Islamophobia, and Trumpism. Individual members have also expressed support for QAnon and white supremacy. According to David Neiwert, the Proud Boys recruit with emphasis on right-wing 15-/30-year-old white males who come primarily from suburbs and exurbs.

The Proud Boys say they have an initiation process that has four stages and includes hazing. The first stage is a loyalty oath, on the order of "I'm a proud Western chauvinist, I refuse to apologize for creating the modern world"; the second is getting punched until the person recites pop culture trivia, such as the names of five breakfast cereals; the third is getting a tattoo and agreeing to not masturbate; and the fourth is getting into a major fight "for the cause". The masturbation policy was later modified to read: "no heterosexual brother of the Fraternity shall masturbate more than one time in any calendar month" and "all members shall abstain from pornography".

The Daily Beast reported in November 2018 that the Proud Boys amended their rules to prohibit cargo shorts and the use of opioids and crystal meth. However, the same article mentioned that no restrictions were placed on cocaine.

==== Gender and sexuality ====
Women and trans men are not allowed to join the Proud Boys, and the unnamed president of Proud Boys L.A. told the Los Angeles Times the group admits only "biological men".

=== Leadership ===
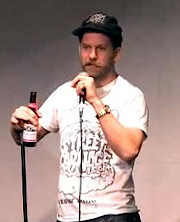
Gavin McInnes, Proud Boys founder

Gavin McInnes founded the group and served as its leader. After the designation of a number of Proud Boys members as extremists with ties to white nationalism, McInnes said that his lawyers had advised him that quitting might help the nine Proud Boys members being prosecuted for the incidents in October. During the announcement, he defended the group, attacked the reporting about it, and said white nationalists do not exist. Further, at times, he said things that made it appear he was not quitting, such as "this is 100% a legal gesture, and it is 100% about alleviating sentencing, [it was a] stepping down gesture, in quotation marks."

As of November 2018, the group named its leaders as Enrique Tarrio, designated as chairman, and the "Elder Chapter", which consists of Harry Fox, Heath Hair, Patrick William Roberts, Joshua Hall, Timothy Kelly, Luke Rofhling and Rufio Panman (real name Ethan Nordean). Jason Lee Van Dyke, who was the organization's lawyer at the time, had been briefly named as chairman to replace McInnes when he left, but the organization announced on November 30 that Van Dyke was no longer associated with the group in any capacity, although his law firm still holds Proud Boys trademarks and is the registered agent for two of the group's chapters.

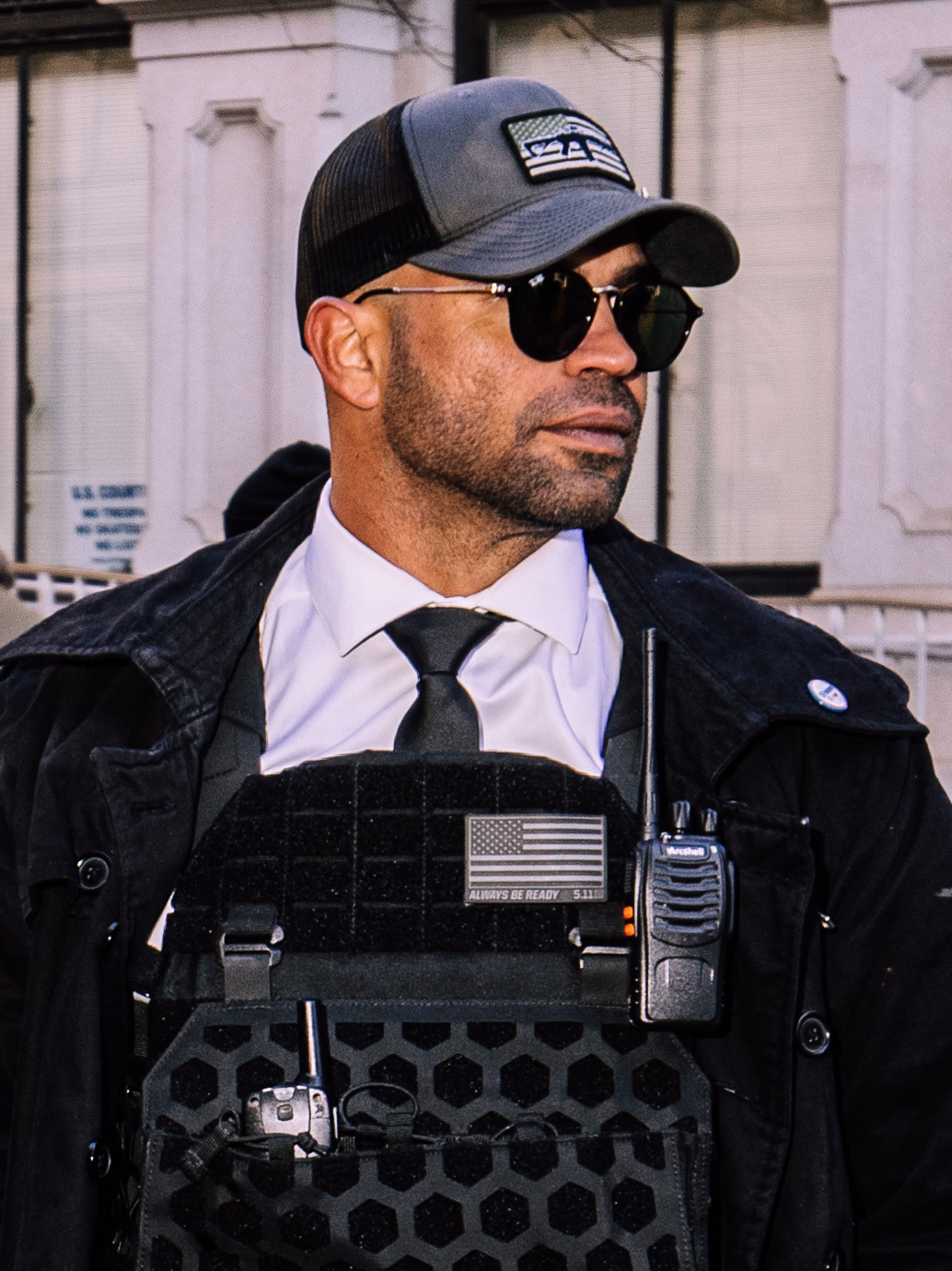
Enrique Tarrio at a rally in 2020. Tarrio became the national chairman of the group in 2018.

Although McInnes had earlier said that any Proud Boy member who was known to have attended the Unite the Right rally was kicked out of the organization, the new chairman Tarrio admitted to having attended the event, but "he had misgivings about the torchlight march and did not participate in it."

In November 2020, Kyle "Based Stickman" Chapman said he would "reassume [his] post as President of the Proud Boys", though it is not evident that Chapman has ever been president of the group. He also announced that the group, which denies being a racist or white supremacist organization, would take on an explicitly white supremacist direction, and that he intended to refocus the organization on the issues of "white genocide" and the "failures of multiculturalism". He also announced that he would change the logo and rename the group to the "Proud Goys", a term used among the far-right to signal antisemitism. The attempted coup is not believed to have been successful, and the Proud Goys name has not been adopted outside of Chapman's social media.

Evidence of further disarray within the leadership of the Proud Boys emerged in February 2021, in the aftermath of the 2021 United States Capitol attack and the many arrests of Proud Boys that followed. The Alabama state chapter issued a statement saying, "We do not recognize the assumed authority of any national Proud Boy leadership including the Chairman, the Elders, or any subsequent governing body that is formed to replace them until such a time we may choose to consent to join those bodies of government." The state chapters of Indiana and Oklahoma endorsed the Alabama statement.

=== Connection with Roger Stone ===
In early 2018, ahead of an appearance at the annual Republican Dorchester Conference in Salem, Oregon, Roger Stone sought out the Proud Boys to act as his "security" for the event; photos posted online showed Stone drinking with several Proud Boys.

In February 2018, the Proud Boys posted a video on Facebook which they described as Stone undergoing a "low-level initiation" into the group. As part of the initiation, Stone says, "Hi, I'm Roger Stone. I'm a Western chauvinist. I refuse to apologize for creating the modern world," making him a "first-degree" member, which Kutner characterizes as being a "sympathizer." Stone denies being a member of the group. In July 2020, Facebook announced it had shut down the accounts and pages linked to Stone and Proud Boys. This network of more than a hundred Facebook and Instagram accounts spent over $300,000 on ads to promote their posts and included false personas.

In late January 2019, when Stone was arrested by the FBI on seven criminal counts in connection with the Mueller investigation, Enrique Tarrio, the chairman of the Proud Boys, met Stone as he left the courthouse in Florida. Tarrio, who wore a "Roger Stone Did Nothing Wrong" T-shirt, sold by a company owned by Tarrio, told a local TV reporter that the indictment was nothing but "trumped-up charges" and was later seen visiting Stone's house. The next day, in Washington, D.C., a small number of Proud Boys demonstrated outside the courthouse where Stone pleaded not guilty to the charges, carrying "Roger Stone did nothing wrong" signs and others that promoted the InfoWars conspiracy website. The Proud Boys got into an argument with anti-Stone hecklers. Tarrio was later filmed behind President Donald Trump in February 2019, during a televised speech in Miami, where he was seen wearing the same message on a T-shirt.

Proud Boys founder Gavin McInnes said Stone was "one of the three approved media figures allowed to speak" about the group. When Stone was asked by a local reporter about the Proud Boys' claim that he had been initiated as a member of the group, he responded by calling the reporter a member of the Communist party. He is particularly close to the group's current leader Enrique Tarrio, who has commercially monetized his position.

The Washington Post reported in February 2021 that the FBI was investigating any role Stone might have had in influencing the Proud Boys and Oath Keepers in their participation in the attack of the Capitol.

The United States House Select Committee on the January 6 Attack also revealed ties between Stone and the group.

=== 2020 presidential debate ===
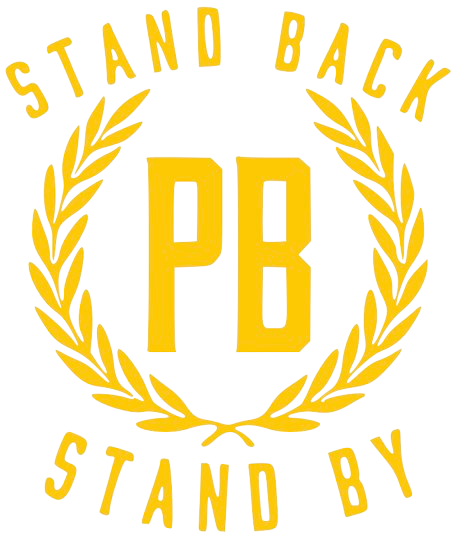
Changed logo alluding to Trump's comments during the debate

In the first 2020 presidential debate on September 29, 2020, President Donald Trump was asked by moderator Chris Wallace: "Are you willing, tonight, to condemn white supremacists and militia groups, and to say that they need to stand down and not add to the violence in a number of these cities as we saw in Kenosha, and as we have seen in Portland?" Trump replied: "Sure. Sure, I am willing to do that." He then asked for clarification, saying: "Who would you like me to condemn?" Wallace mentioned "white supremacists and right wing militia". During the exchange, Democratic presidential candidate Joe Biden replied "Proud Boys" and Trump replied: "Proud Boys, stand back and stand by, but I'll tell you what, I'll tell you what, somebody's got to do something about antifa and the left, because this is not a right-wing problem." Shortly after, Joe Biggs, one of the Proud Boys organizers, shared through his Parler social media account a logo with the president's words "Stand back" and "Stand by".

External videos
- The Proud Boys: How the right-wing extremist group gained prominence. The Washington Post, September 30, 2020.

One researcher said that Proud Boys memberships on Telegram channels grew nearly ten percent after the debate. The Washington Post reported that Trump's comments were quickly "enshrined in memes, including one depicting Trump in one of the Proud Boys' signature polo shirts. Another meme showed Trump's quote alongside an image of bearded men carrying American flags and appearing to prepare for a fight."

On September 30, President Trump clarified his statement, stating that he "doesn't know what the Proud Boys are" and that "they should stand down. Let law enforcement do their work." On October 1, Trump said on Sean Hannity's show: "I've said it many times, and let me be clear again: I condemn the KKK. I condemn all white supremacists. I condemn the Proud Boys. I don't know much about the Proud Boys, almost nothing. But I condemn that."

During the second and final presidential debate on October 22, Democratic candidate Joe Biden mistakenly referred to the Proud Boys as "poor boys", a slip that went viral on social media.

=== Foreign disinformation during the 2020 presidential campaign ===
During the 2020 presidential campaign in October, threatening emails claiming to be from the Proud Boys were sent to Democratic voters in Alaska, Arizona, Florida and Pennsylvania, the last three of which were swing states in the upcoming election. The emails warned: "You will vote for Trump on Election Day or we will come after you." Proud Boys chairman Enrique Tarrio denied the group's involvement and said he had spoken to the FBI about it. Tarrio told The Washington Post that "[t]wo weeks ago I believe we had Google Cloud services drop us from their platform, so then we initiated a url transfer, which is still in process. We kind of just never used it." Miami New Times reported that the emails came from info@proudboysofficial.com, one of two websites belonging to the Proud Boys, and which Tarrio said had not been updated in a year and a half. Tarrio added that an authentic email from the Proud Boys would come from proudboysusa.com. The FBI announced that Iranian intelligence was responsible for the spoofed emails sent to intimidate Florida voters, and added that Russia was also working to influence the election. Officials from each country denied the accusations.

== Activities and events ==
Since its foundation in 2016, members of the Proud Boys have been involved in a number of controversial and violent events. This list contains a number of those events, some of which have resulted in criminal charges being filed against participants.

=== 2017–2018 ===
At the 2017 March 4 Trump rally in Berkeley, California, Kyle Chapman was recorded hitting a counter-protester over the head with a wooden dowel. Images of Chapman went viral, and the Proud Boys organized a crowdfunding campaign for Chapman's bail after his arrest. After this, McInnes invited Chapman to become involved with the Proud Boys, through which he formed the Fraternal Order of the Alt-Knights. On April 15, 2017, an alt-right rally was organized in Berkeley by the Liberty Revival Alliance, which did not seek or receive a permit, and was attended by members of the Proud Boys, Identity Evropa (an American neo-Nazi group) and Oath Keepers. Many of these people traveled to Berkeley from other parts of the country. The rally was counter-protested and violence broke out, resulting in 21 people being arrested.

In June 2017, McInnes disavowed the planned Unite the Right rally in Charlottesville, Virginia. However, Proud Boys were at the August 2017 alt-right event, which was organized by white supremacist Jason Kessler. Kessler had joined the Proud Boys some time before organizing the event. McInnes said he had kicked Kessler out after his views on race had become clear. After the rally, Kessler accused McInnes of using him as a "patsy" and said: "You're trying to cuck and save your own ass." Alex Michael Ramos, one of the men convicted for the assault of DeAndre Harris which took place at the rally, was associated with the Proud Boys and Fraternal Order of Alt-Knights.

The Proud Boys have been active for several years in the Pacific Northwest of the United States. Starting in September 2017 and continuing into 2018, the Proud Boys participated in several rallies organized by Patriot Prayer in Portland, Oregon, and nearby Vancouver, Washington. Scenes of violence from one of these rallies was turned into a sizzle reel for the Proud Boys and was circulated on social media. Violence erupted at two events in June 2018, leaving five people hospitalized after the far-right march on June 30 devolved into a riot in downtown Portland.

=== 2017 AIPAC conference assault ===
In March 2017, Brandon David William Vaughan, a member of the Proud Boys' Ottawa chapter, took part in the assault on Kamal Nayfeh, a 55-year-old Palestinian-American community college professor, outside the American Israel Public Affairs Committee (AIPAC) conference in Washington, D.C.; video footage of the incident shows Proud Boys members fighting alongside the Jewish Defense League.

=== 2018 Metropolitan Republican Club Incident ===
In October 2018, McInnes gave a talk at the Metropolitan Republican Club on the Upper East Side of Manhattan. He stepped out of his car wearing glasses with Asian eyes drawn on the front and pulled a samurai sword out of its sheath. Police forced him inside. Later, inside the event, McInnes and an Asian member of the Proud Boys re-enacted the 1960 assassination of Inejirō Asanuma, the leader of the Japanese Socialist Party; a captioned photograph of the actual assassination had become a meme in alt-right social media. The audience for the event was described by The New York Times as "a cross-section of New York's far-right subculture: libertarians, conspiracy theorists and nationalists who have coalesced around their opposition to Islam, feminism and liberal politics."

==== Protesters ====
Anti-fascist activists had started protesting outside the club before the event and had reportedly engaged in vandalism. Following cross-provocations between the opposing sides, the Proud Boys charged towards the protesters, who threw a bottle in response, resulting in a fight. NYC police present at the protest reportedly did not respond.

==== Incident ====
Video evidence from three separate videos showed conclusively that the Proud Boys had instigated the fight after the Metropolitan Republican Club event. John Miller, New York City's deputy police commissioner for intelligence and counterterrorism, said that "incidents like [the post-MRC fight] make it more likely" that the Proud Boys would be "higher on the radar" of authorities.

Ten men connected to the Proud Boys were arrested in connection with the October 2018 incident. Seven Proud Boys pleaded guilty to various charges including riot, disorderly conduct and attempted assault.

Three of the men accepted plea deals. Douglas Lennan pled guilty to one count of riot and one count of attempted assault, and agreed to complete five days of community service in exchange for a no-jail sentence. Jake Freijo and Eryk Kacznyski pled guilty to a charge of disorderly conduct and also agreed to complete five days of community service.

In August 2019, two more of the Proud Boys, Maxwell Hare and John Kinsman, were convicted following a jury trial of attempted gang assault, attempted assault and riot; the jury deliberated a day and a half before rejecting their claims of self-defense. Hare and Kinsman were each sentenced to four years in prison. The final defendant is awaiting trial.

The four anti-fascist victims of the beating are not cooperating with prosecutors, even to the extent of revealing their identities, and are known only as "Shaved Head", "Ponytail", "Khaki" and "Spiky Belt". Because of that non-cooperation, the Proud Boys were not charged with assault—which requires evidence of injury—but with riot and attempted assault. The bulk of the evidence in the trial came from videos.

==== Aftermath ====
The fallout from the incident left the group in internal disarray. After McInnes nominally left the group, the "Elder Chapter" of the group reportedly assumed control. Jason Lee Van Dyke, the group's lawyer, was appointed as the chapter's chairman. Van Dyke was previously known for suing news media and anti-fascist activists for reporting on the group, and for making violent online threats with racist language.

The group then publicly released its new bylaw online, with the names of its "Elder Chapter" members listed and redacted. The redaction was later discovered to be botched, as the list of names can be accessed by selecting over the black bar of the released document. A day later, the chapter announced that Van Dyke was no longer leader of the group, and Enrique Tarrio is the group's new chairman.

=== 2019 Demand Free Speech rally ===
A Proud Boys rally called Demand Free Speech took place on July 6, 2019, in Washington, D.C.'s Freedom Plaza and Pershing Park, drawing about 250 people. McInnes, Laura Loomer and Milo Yiannopoulos appeared, while former Trump advisor Roger Stone and Jacob Wohl did not. A counter-protest and dance party across the street drew more people than the main rally. Police said there were only minor skirmishes between the far-right and antifa, and no arrests were made.

Republican candidate Omar Navarro, a perennial challenger for Democratic Congresswoman Maxine Waters' congressional seat, withdrew from speaking at the event, tweeting that his ex-girlfriend DeAnna Lorraine, a self-described "MAGA relationship expert", had threatened him, using cocaine and having sex with members of the Proud Boys. In response to Navarro's tweets, the Proud Boys issued a video featuring former InfoWars staff member Joe Biggs and Ethan Nordean—the star of a viral video showing him beating up an antifa protester—in which they "banished" Navarro from the Proud Boys. The Proud Boys' chairman Enrique Tarrio described the group as "pro-drugs". Other speakers who had been scheduled for the rally, including Pizzagate promoters Mike Cernovich and Jack Posobiec, had already canceled their appearances for reasons not apparently related to Navarro's charges.

=== End Domestic Terrorism rally 2019 ===
The Proud Boys and Joe Biggs organized an August 17, 2019, demonstration in Portland attended by members of several far-right groups. The End Domestic Terrorism rally, which was sometimes subtitled "Better Dead than Red", was intended to promote the idea that antifa should be classified as "domestic terrorism". It received national attention, including a tweet from President Trump. One day prior to the rally, Patriot Prayer's Joey Gibson, who had organized similar events in 2017 and 2018, was taken into custody on charges of felony rioting during a May 1, 2019, incident. The Proud Boys organized the August event in response to a video that went viral of masked demonstrators assaulting conservative blogger Andy Ngo at a Portland rally on June 29, 2019. The End Domestic Terrorism event drew more counter-demonstrators than participants (at least one group urged its members in advance to not attend) and ended with the Proud Boys' requesting a police escort to leave.

=== 2020 COVID-19 misinformation ===
Like other far-right groups, the Proud Boys have shown interest in making common cause with the anti-vaccination movement, presumably for recruiting and fundraising purposes.

On May 1, 2020, the Center on Terrorism, Extremism, and Counterterrorism (CTEC) at the Middlebury Institute of International Studies at Monterey compiled a report examining the influence of the Proud Boys on anti-lockdown protests and COVID-19 misinformation. Members of the group shared conspiracy theories about Bill Gates, a "plandemic", and COVID-19 vaccines on social media, especially Telegram.

On May 10, 2020, a bulletin on COVID-19 protest disinformation campaigns by the Colorado Information Analysis Center (CIAC) described how "the Proud Boys, a far-right extremist group, has been active in spreading conspiracy theories regarding COVID-19 on Twitter, Facebook, and Telegram," suggesting that "a faction of elites are weaponizing the virus, and a vaccine would likely be a tool for population control and mind control." The CIAC bulletin also warned that "spread of disinformation has the potential to cause civil unrest and mass panic".

On October 1, 2020, The Guardian reported several United States agencies variously described the Proud Boys as "a dangerous 'white supremacist' group", "white supremacists", "extremists" and as "a gang", with law enforcement showing concern "about the group's menace to minority groups and police officers, and its conspiracy theories", including COVID-19 misinformation and conspiracy theories.

A group of Proud Boys was present at a large rally against public health measures, on January 23, 2022. The event was organized by the anti-vaccination group Children's Health Defense and featured leaders of the movement such as Robert F. Kennedy Jr. and Del Bigtree.

=== Anti-BLM protests ===
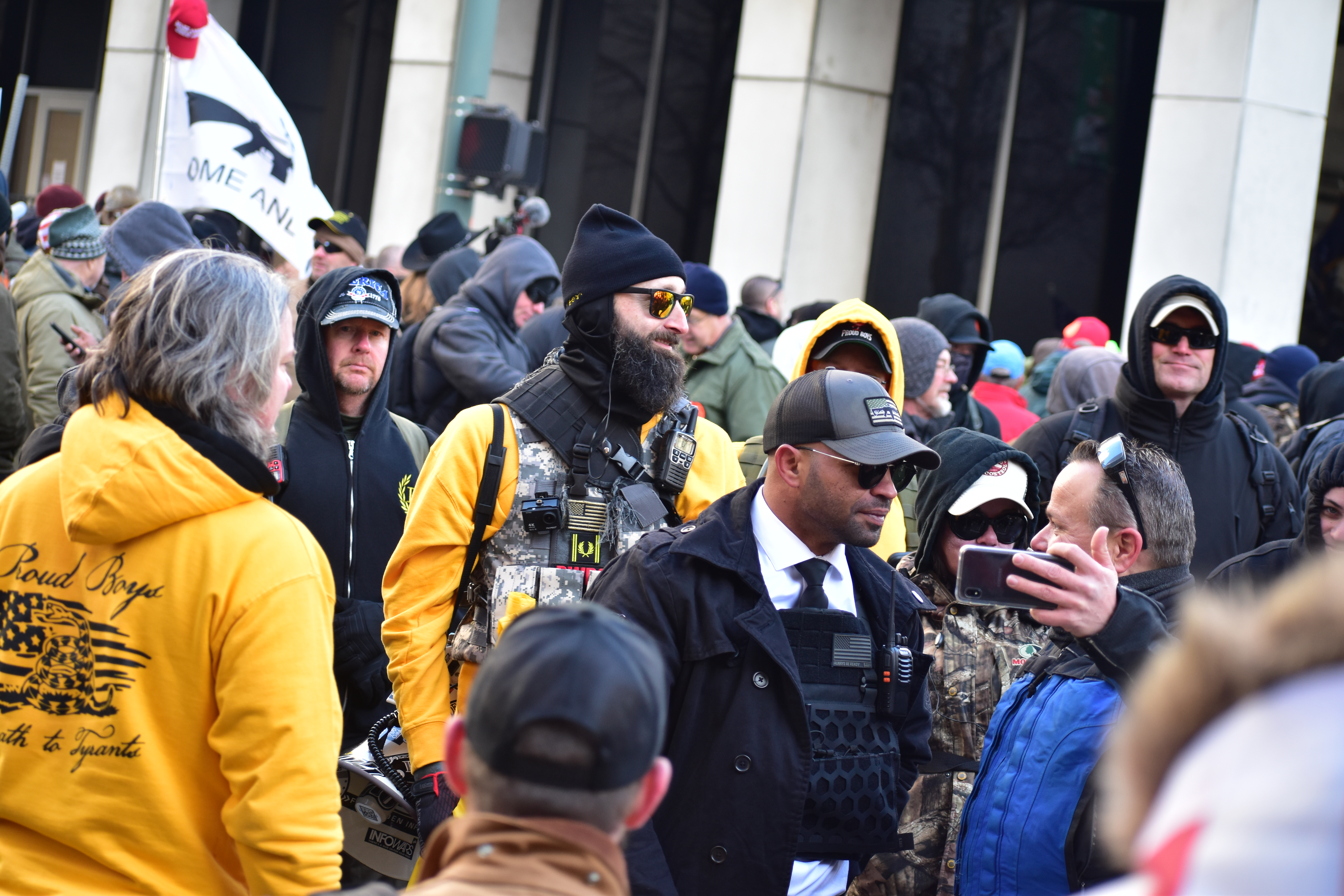
The Proud Boys at a Second Amendment rally in Richmond

In January 2020, the Proud Boys attended a large Second Amendment rally in Richmond, Virginia. They are opposed to Black Lives Matter protests and see attempts to remove statues of Confederate leaders and other historical figures as a "left-wing plot to destroy American history".

On May 30, 2020, Facebook officials reported that internal systems flagged activity from Proud Boys-related accounts encouraging "armed agitators" to attend protests following the murder of George Floyd.

The group remained active in the Pacific Northwest and had a dozen chapters in Idaho, Oregon and Washington by 2020. In June 2020, members of the Proud Boys rallied at the Capitol Hill Autonomous Zone in Seattle, Washington, in an effort to confront protesters.

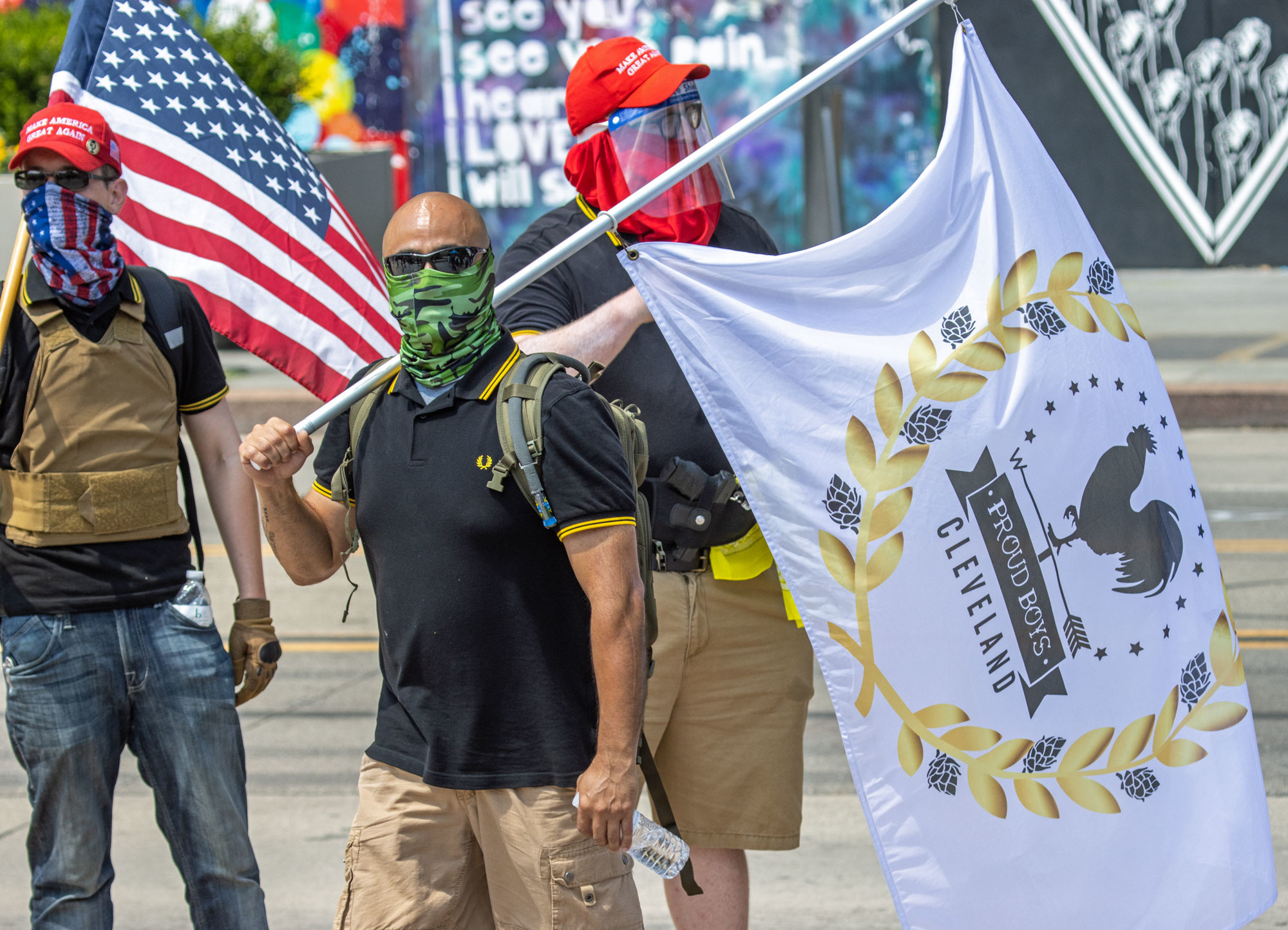
The Proud Boys at an Ohio event in 2020

Washington resident and Proud Boys member Tusitala "Tiny" Toese, known for brawling in the streets of Portland and Seattle during political protests, was arrested in Washington on August 28, 2020. He was wanted for multiple probation violations related to his 2018 misdemeanor assault conviction that left a protester with stitches and a concussion in June 2018. Toese, previously affiliated with Patriot Prayer, had been observed participating in other assaults with members of the Proud Boys, including an assault at a Clark County, Washington mall in May 2018 and an assault in Seattle in June 2020.

Alan Swinney, a Texas-based Proud Boys member, was arrested on September 30, 2020, and held in Oregon on "multiple assault charges, pointing a firearm at another, unlawful use of a weapon and unlawful use of tear gas, stun gun or mace." On October 5, 2016, a jury found Swinney guilty of 11 charges stemming from BLM protests in Oregon on August 15 and 22, 2020, at which he ruined a man's eye with a paint ball gun, sprayed marchers with bear mace and pointed a loaded .357 pistol at others. He was found guilty and sentenced to 10 years in prison with three more years of supervision.

=== 2020 church attacks ===
On December 12, 2020, Ashbury United Methodist Church, the oldest historically black church in Washington, D.C., was targeted by Enrique Tarrio and the Proud Boys after pro-Trump protests earlier that day. They flashed white supremacist hand signs (the OK hand gesture), chanted "Fuck Antifa," and tore down and burned a Black Lives Matter sign that had been raised by the church. Police said that more than three dozen people were arrested and four churches were vandalized. Reverend Ianther M. Mills, the church's pastor, described the acts as "reminiscent of cross burnings" and expressed sadness that local police had failed to intervene. Proud Boys leader Enrique Tarrio claimed responsibility for the incident, which police have designated a hate crime.

Tarrio was arrested on January 4, 2021, after police found weapon magazines in his car during a traffic stop. He was charged with one count of destruction of property (a misdemeanor) and two counts of possession of high-capacity ammunition feeding devices (a felony). Tarrio pleaded guilty to both charges and on August 24, 2021, was sentenced to almost six months in jail, starting on September 6.

The Metropolitan African Methodist Episcopal Church was also vandalized on December 12, 2020, and sued the Proud Boys and Tarrio. The judge also issued an injunction banning Tarrio from entering the District of Columbia with the limited exception for court-related matters. In June 2023, District of Columbia Superior Court Judge Neal E. Kravitz imposed civil penalties of over $1 million on the Proud Boys and four of its members, Tarrio, Joe Biggs, Jeremy Bertino and John Turano. Kravitz said that the four men had engaged in "hateful and overtly racist conduct" when they attacked the church. On February 3, 2025, after the Proud Boys failed to satisfy the monetary judgment, a District of Columbia court awarded the trademarked name and symbols of the group to the church to satisfy the judgment. The ruling allows the church to seize money the group makes by selling merchandise or otherwise using the term "Proud Boys".

Following the assassination of Charlie Kirk multiple Proud Boys chapters would organize events and attend vigils dedicated to Charlie Kirk. Other members would call for retaliatory violence.

== Participation in the January 6 United States Capitol attack ==
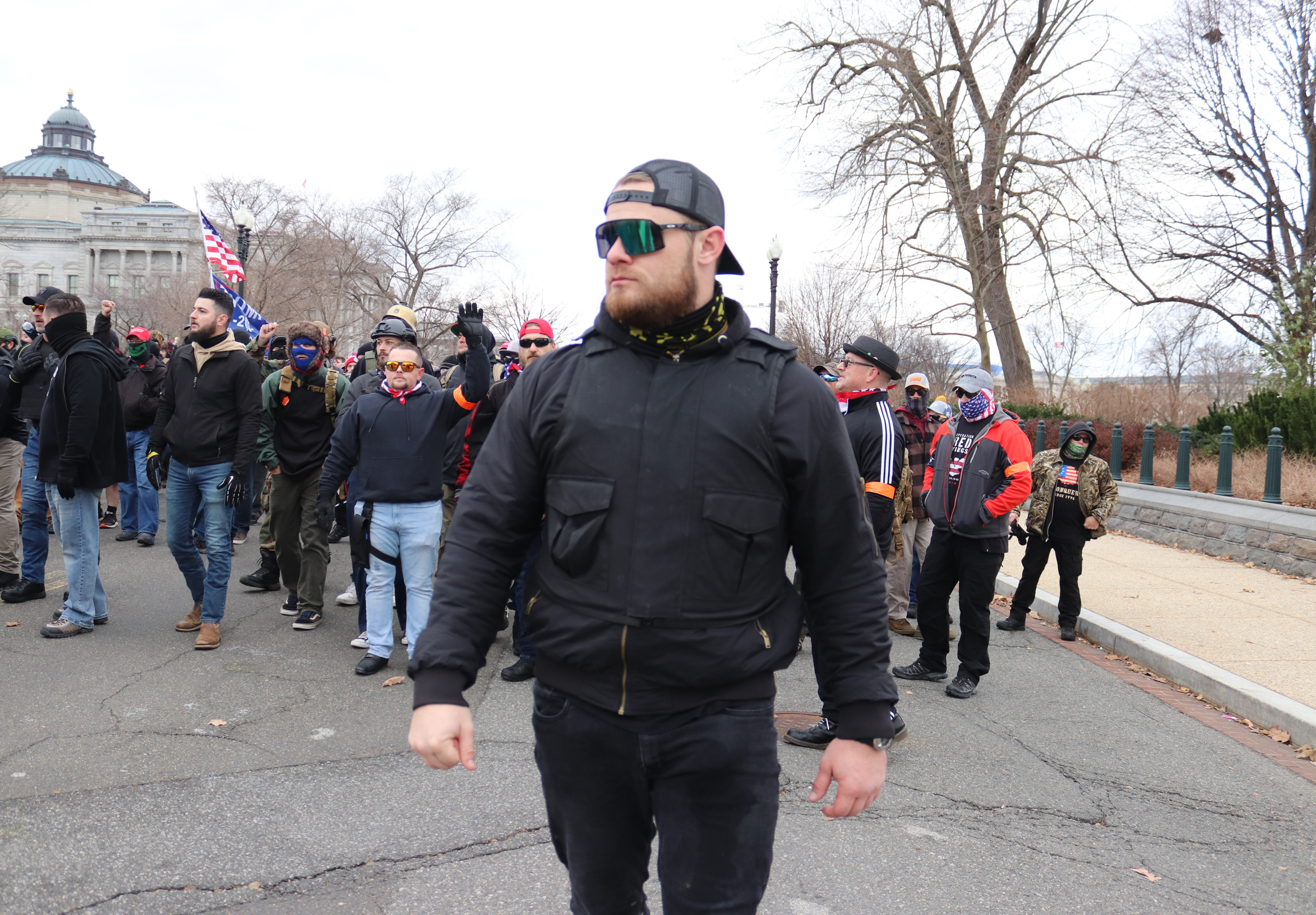
Ethan Nordean leads a contingent...

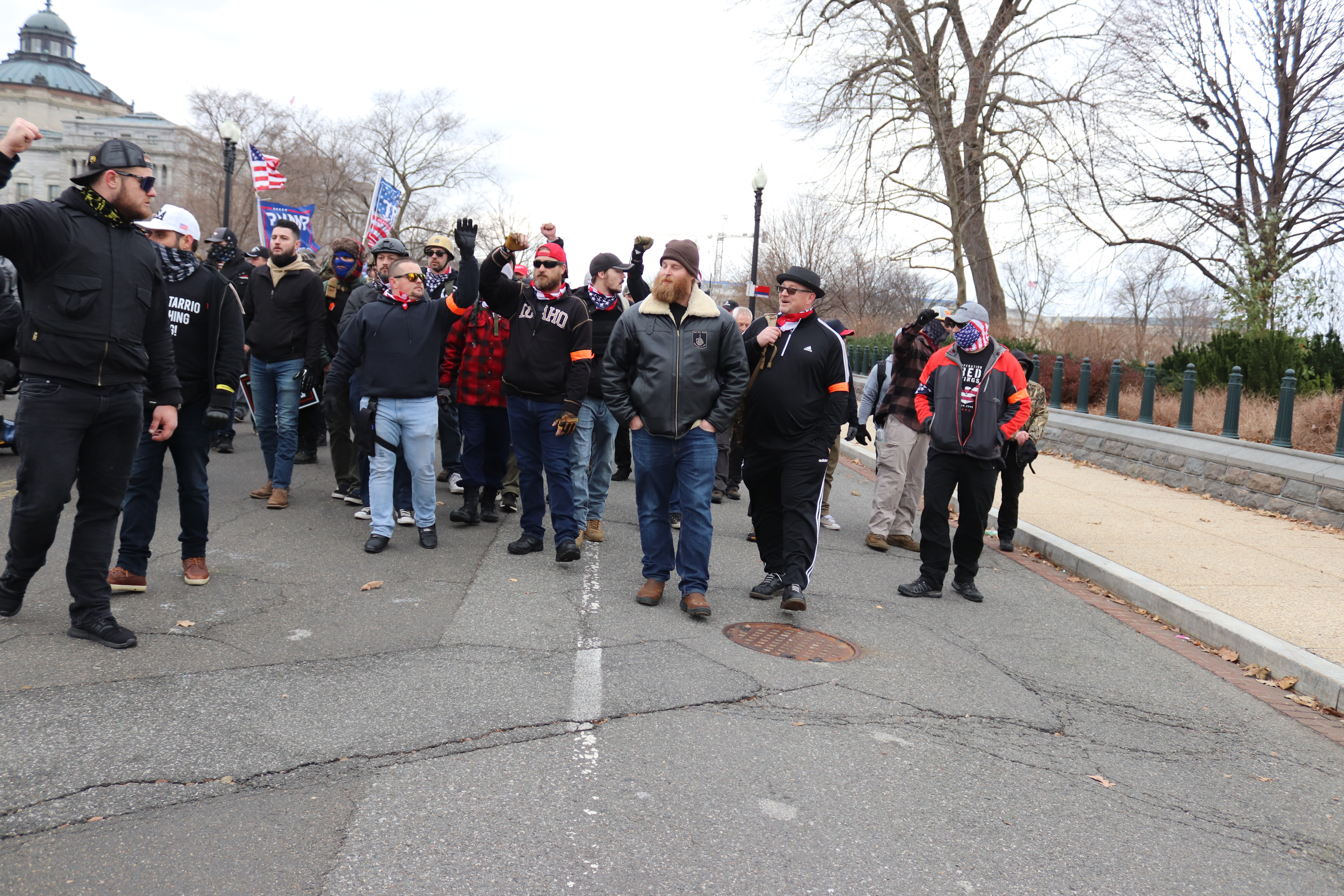
...of the Proud Boys, as they pass the U.S. Supreme Court on their way to the Capitol building on January 6, 2021.

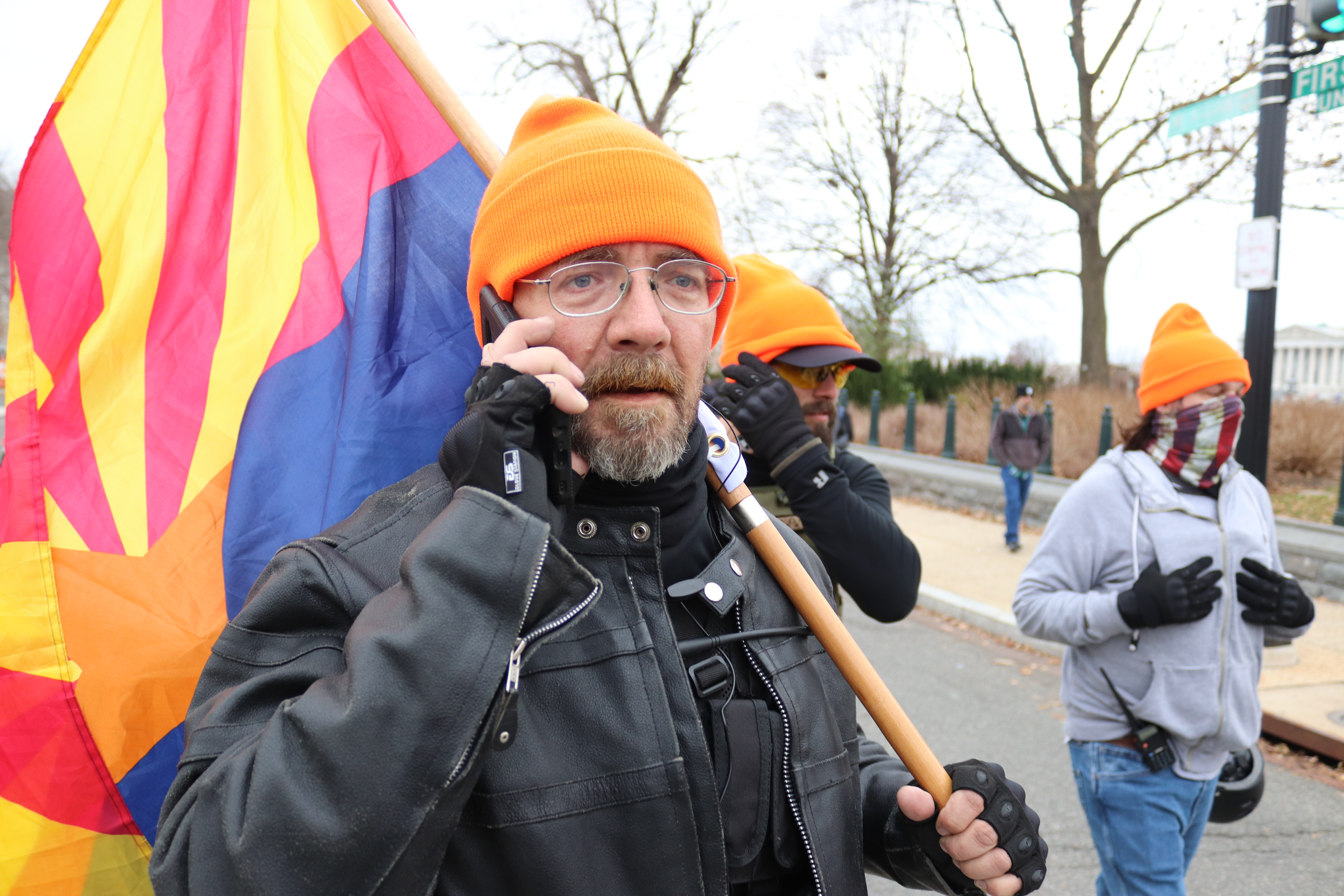
Proud Boys from Arizona marching to the Capitol building wearing orange hats

Members of the Proud Boys participated in the attack on the United States Capitol building on January 6, 2021, where some members of the group appeared wearing orange hats. Some members wore all black clothing, rather than their usual black and yellow attire, as Tarrio had suggested in a Parler post days earlier, which prosecutors said was an apparent reference to mimicking the appearance of antifa members. A review by The Wall Street Journal of social media posts from Proud Boys members showed that the group repeatedly invoked Trump's messages as a call to action, and were disheartened by the arrests and what they perceived to be Trump's lack of action in the days leading up to Joe Biden's inauguration.

On December 30, 2020, the Proud Boys held a videoconference to announce the founding of an elite chapter of their members called the Ministry of Self-Defense. At the conference, Enrique Tarrio instructed members that they should avoid other protesters, behave in an orderly manner, and never cross police lines.

According to the ADL, a former member of the Proud Boys founded the neo-Nazi extremist group NSC-131 in 2019. NSC-131 also attended the January 6 attack on the Capitol, and have bragged about stealing police gear such as helmets and batons.

A New York Times investigative video titled "How the Proud Boys Breached the Capitol" and testimony and video by documentary filmmaker Nick Quested during hearings of the January 6th Committee showed that the Proud Boys played a key role in the January 6 Insurrection. The Times video investigation concludes "...the Proud Boys played critical roles, from the first moment of violence to multiple breaches of the Capitol while leaving the impression that it was just ordinary protesters leading the charge." Similarly, on June 9, 2022, filmmaker Nick Quested testified to the January 6th Committee that:

NICK QUESTED: We met up with the Proud Boys somewhere around 10:30 am and they were starting to walk down the Mall, an easterly direction towards the Capitol. There was a large contingent, more than I had expected. And I was confused to a certain extent why we were walking away from the President's speech because that's what I felt we were there to cover.

BENNIE THOMPSON: So at 10:30 am, that's early in the day. That's even before President Trump had started speaking. Am I correct?

NICK QUESTED: Yes, sir.

...

BENNIE THOMPSON: ... You now estimate that there were around 250 to 300 individuals that — you've testified.

NICK QUESTED: (Nods)

Quested also said separately to NPR, in an interview:

There's only one moment where that - the sort of facade of marching and protesting might have fallen, which is there was a - one of the Proud Boys called Milkshake and Eddie Block on his livestream catches Milkshake saying, well, let's go storm the Capitol with Nordean - Rufio - one of the leaders of the Proud Boys saying, you could keep that quiet, please, Milkshake. And then we continued on marching.

The NYT investigative video report tracks the roles of Proud Boys throughout multiple video clips. It starts off with Joe Biggs directing the Proud Boys to blend in with others, he said "...we are going to go incognito...". and later explains that "Proud Boy leaders crafted a chain of command specifically for Jan. 6". Many of the Proud Boys also "worked as teams" and "Telegram messages from that morning show that some of the Proud Boys intend to rile up other protesters," with one thread having this exchange between Proud Boy members:

UCC-1: I want to see thousands of normies burn that city to ash today. Person-2: Would be epic.

January 6 testimony by Capitol police officer Caroline Edwards described the first breach after the Proud Boys arrived.

Ms. Edwards described how a Proud Boys leader named Joseph Biggs encouraged another man to approach the bike rack barricade where she was posted. That man, Ryan Samsel, she said, pushed the bike rack over, causing her to hit her head and lose consciousness.

But before she blacked out, Ms. Edwards recalled seeing "a war scene" playing out in front of her. Police officers were bleeding and throwing up, she recalled.

"It was carnage," she said. "It was chaos."

The Capitol Hill police were vastly outnumbered: "...the mob on the west side eventually grew to at least 9,400 people, outnumbering officers by more than 58 to one." Video shown during the January 6 committee hearings show Officer Edwards being pushed back behind a bicycle rack as Proud Boys push barricades towards her, knocking her off her feet and causing her to hit her head on the concrete steps.

Later, as the attack progressed, the Proud Boys were stalled by Capitol officers on the west side. The NYT video investigation shows how Proud Boys' leaders fell back, assessed the situation for about fifteen minutes, and then redirected their attack to weaker points. The redirected effort focused on the east side and a scaffolding leading up to building entrances. The protesters on the east side, led by the Proud Boys, now easily overran the police in the plaza. On the west side, after about a twenty-minute battle on the scaffolding steps, the Proud Boys broke through the resistance and rushed up the steps of the Capitol. One of the first breaches of the Capitol was by Proud Boy Dominic Pezzola breaking in a window using a stolen police shield.

The Times report "...found a pattern in how the Proud Boys moved on the ground". As in this example, "Over and over, at key moments when the Capitol was breached, the group used the same set of tactics: identifying access points to the building, riling up other protesters and sometimes directly joining in the violence. When met with resistance, leaders of the group reassessed, and teams of Proud Boys targeted new entry points to the Capitol."

Another key revelation about the Proud Boy's plans came from an informant and concerned Mike Pence:

According to an F.B.I. affidavit the panel highlighted ... a government informant said that members of the far-right militant group the Proud Boys told him they would have killed Pence 'if given the chance.' The rioters on January 6th almost had that chance, coming within forty feet of the Vice-President as he fled to safety.

Representative Bennie G. Thompson (D-Miss.), the chairman of the United States House Homeland Security Committee, filed a federal lawsuit against Donald Trump, Rudy Giuliani, Oath Keepers founder Stewart Rhodes, and Proud Boys International LLC. The lawsuit alleges that the events at the Capitol on January 6 violated the Third Enforcement Act of 1871. The chairman of the Proud Boys, Enrique Tarrio, called the lawsuit "frivolous".

The New York Times reported in March 2021 that the incident had caused Proud Boys and other far-right groups to splinter amid disagreements on whether the attack had gone too far or was a success, and doubts about the leadership of their organizations, raising concerns of increasing numbers of lone wolf actors who would be more difficult to monitor and might pursue more extreme actions.

The Times also reported that the FBI was investigating communications between an unnamed associate of the White House and an unnamed member of Proud Boys during the days prior to the incursion. The communications had been detected by examining cellphone metadata and were separate from previously known contacts between Roger Stone and Proud Boys.

Citing private Facebook messages, prosecutors alleged in a March 2021 court filing that during the weeks preceding the attack, Florida Oath Keepers leader Kelly Meggs had contacted Proud Boys who he said could serve as a "force multiplier" and that he had "organized an alliance" among the Oath Keepers, Proud Boys and the Florida chapter of the Three Percenters. A US district court in Portland also charged two Oregon brothers who are members of the group with the federal crimes of violence and terrorism for actions related to the attack at the Capitol.

In June 2021, federal judge Royce Lamberth declined to release Proud Boys member Christopher Worrell of East Naples, Florida, prior to his trial, citing Facebook posts he had made threatening retribution against those who he believed "ratted" him out to the FBI. In November 2021, Worrell was released from jail and put under house arrest. In August 2023, four days before his sentencing, he cut off his ankle monitor and disappeared, and a warrant was issued for his arrest. He was found at home on September 28, at which point he faked an opioid overdose. In January 2024, he was sentenced to 10 years.

On May 19, 2023, Shane Lamond, a DC police lieutenant, was arrested. Lamond and Tarrio had allegedly shared over 500 text messages by December 2020 in which Lamond warned Tarrio he was being investigated and told him what the police already knew. Prosecutors say that Lamond lied when asked in June 2021 about this contact with Tarrio. The trial began December 2, 2024. On December 5, Tarrio, wearing a prison jumpsuit, testified in court that he had spoken to Lamond in 2020 but denied that Lamond had ever warned him that he would be arrested. On December 23, Lamond was convicted, and on June 6, 2025, he was sentenced to 18 months in prison.

On October 16, 2023, William Chrestman, a Proud Boys member, pled guilty to obstructing a congressional proceeding and to threatening to assault a federal officer. On January 12, 2024, he was sentenced to 55 months in prison.

=== Indictments for conspiracy ===
The Justice Department announced on February 3, 2021, that two Proud Boys members had been indicted for conspiracy. Five more individuals affiliated with the Proud Boys were charged with conspiracy on February 11, followed by six more on February 26. Federal grand jury conspiracy indictments of others followed. Federal prosecutors considered pursuing charges under the Racketeer Influenced and Corrupt Organizations Act, typically used to prosecute organized crime syndicates.

On November 23, 2021, Tarrio and Proud Boys International LLC were subpoenaed by the United States House Select Committee on the January 6 Attack. The committee's belief was that members of the organization have information about the preparations of the event, and what led to the ensuing violence.

In December, a federal judge rejected an argument made by four Proud Boys members that their participation in the attack could be considered a protected First Amendment demonstration.

The indicted are:

1. Charles Donohoe, leader of the North Carolina chapter of the Proud Boys, in April 2022, became the first member of Proud Boys leadership to plead guilty to conspiracy and agree to cooperate with prosecutors. After entering his plea, his attorneys released court papers in which Donohoe admitted that several leaders and members of the Proud Boys had discussed using "force and violence" to disrupt the certification of the election "to show Congress that 'we the people' were in charge." He also stated that before arriving in Washington the Proud Boys had discussed storming the Capitol, which he said "would achieve the group's goal of stopping the government from carrying out the transfer of presidential power."
2. Nicholas Ochs, leader of the Hawaii chapter of the Proud Boys and Republican candidate for the Hawaiian state legislature from Waikiki, was present at the January 6 United States Capitol attack and admitted entering the Capitol as well as throwing smoke bombs at police. He was arrested and pled guilty to obstruction of an official proceeding. He was found guilty of felony obstruction of an official proceeding and sentenced to four years in prison, three years of supervised release and fined.
3. Shawn Price, a Proud Boy member from Rockaway, and vice president of a local group, traveled to Washington, D.C., and on January 6, 2021, and aggressively pushed the crowd forward into a line of defending police officers. He pled guilty to interfering with law enforcement officers during a civil disorder.
4. Matthew Greene, Proud Boys member from Syracuse, NY had told other Proud Boys in encrypted messages that they needed to "stand together now or end up in the gulag separately". He pleaded guilty in December 2021 to conspiracy and obstruction of an official proceeding and became the first Proud Boy to agree to cooperate with prosecutors.
5. Nicholas DeCarlo, a member of the Proud Boys from Fort Worth, Texas met Proud Boy Nicolas Ochs from Hawaii and entered the U.S. Capitol. Ochs taped themselves saying, "We're not supposed to be here, this is beyond the fence," and DeCarlo said, "We're all felons, yeah!" Later they taped themselves on the streets of Washington and saying, "As we've been saying all day, we came here to stop the steal." To which DeCarlo added: "We did it. ... We did our job." DeCarlo has pled guilty to a count of obstruction of an official proceeding.
6. Joshua Pruitt, a member of the DC/Maryland Proud Boys attended the January 6 United States Capitol attack where he smashed signs, obstructed an Official Proceeding and chased Senate Majority Leader Chuck Schumer. He was found guilty and sentenced to 55 months in prison.
7. Jeremy Bertino, Proud Boy from Belmont, North Carolina, and described as a "lieutenant" to Enrique Tarrio pled guilty to seditious conspiracy and firearms possession "to overthrow, put down or to destroy by force the government of the United States". He awaits sentencing.

On March 7, 2022, the Justice Department issued the Second Superseding indictment against Ethan Nordean, Joseph Biggs, Zachary Rehl, Charles Donohoe, Enrique Tarrio and Dominic Pezzola. On June 6, 2022, a Third Superseding Indictment was issued against Ethan Nordean, Joseph Biggs, Zachary Rehl, Enrique Tarrio and Dominic Pezzola.

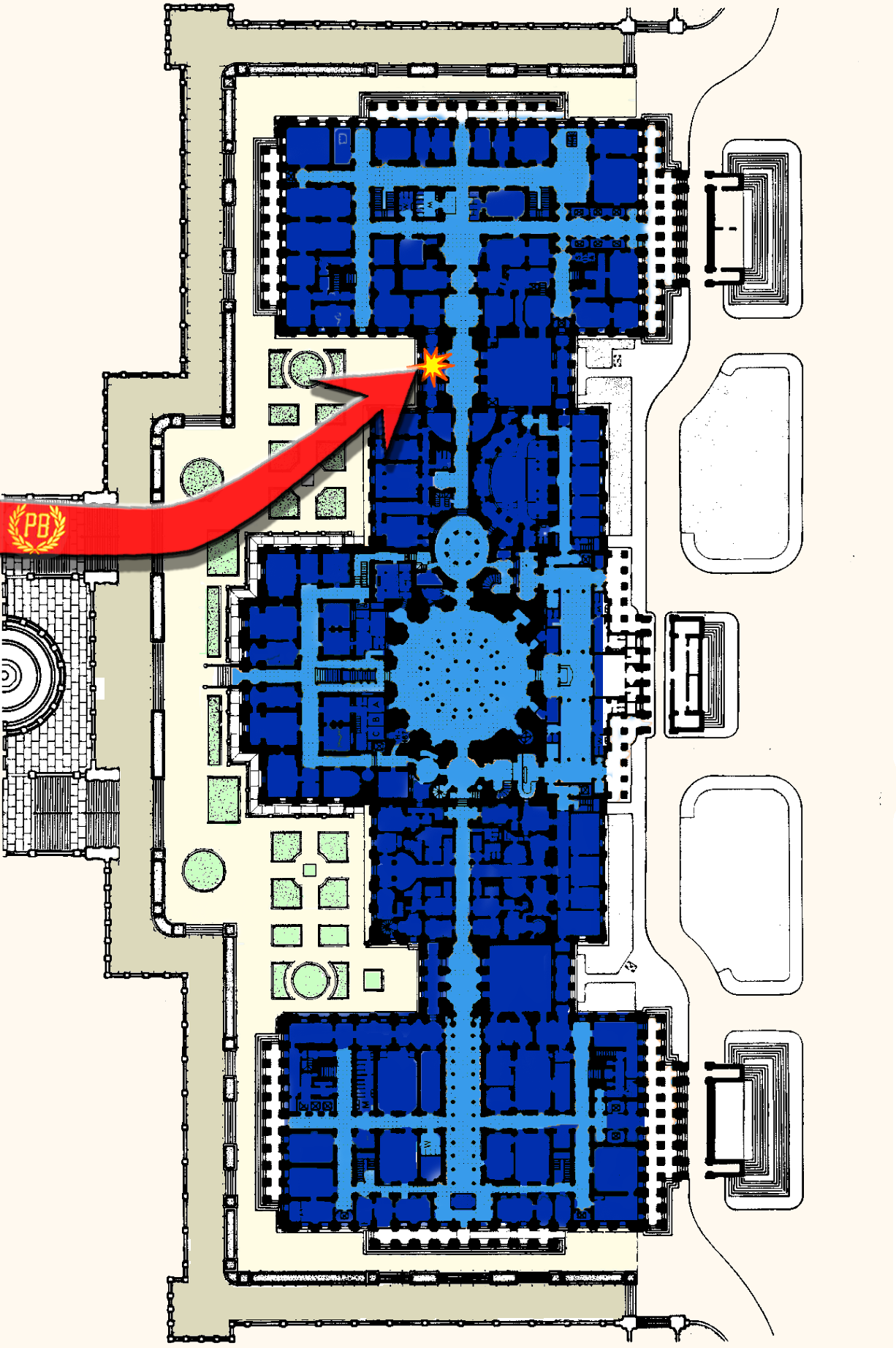
On January 6, Proud Boys led the "tip of the spear" to breach the Capitol Building.

On June 6, 2022, the Justice Department announced that five Proud Boys had been indicted for "seditious conspiracy," a charge to be added to their February 2021 indictments of obstructing the certification of the 2020 presidential election. They are:

1. Enrique Tarrio, National Chairman of the Proud Boys. On March 22, 2023, federal prosecutors revealed that a witness they expected Tarrio to call in his defense the next day had been a government informant for nearly two years.
2. Joe Biggs from Ormond Beach, Florida was found guilty of seditious conspiracy and sentenced to 17 years in federal prison.
3. Ethan Nordean, also known as Rufio Panman, is a Proud Boys leader from Auburn, Washington. Nordean was found guilty of seditious conspiracy was sentenced to 18 years in prison.
4. Dominic Pezzola, Proud Boy member from Rochester, New York. On May 4, 2023, following a three-month trial and 30 hours of jury deliberation, Pezzola was convicted of multiple charges, including obstruction of a Congressional proceedings, civil disorder, assaulting an officer, robbing an officer and destroying the window. The jury acquitted him of the most serious charge, seditious conspiracy, although his four co-defendants were convicted of that crime. The jury deadlocked on other charges against Pezzola, including conspiring to obstruct the counting of the electoral votes.
5. Zachary Rehl, president of the Philadelphia Proud Boy chapter, posted on social media, "Hopefully the firing squads are for the traitors that are trying to steal the election from the American people." He had been charged with seditious conspiracy. He was found to have pepper-sprayed officers, was sentenced to 15 years in federal prison.
6. Freedom Vy, Proud Boy member from Philadelphia, allegedly broke into the office of U.S. Sen. Jeff Merkley of Oregon and has been charged with Unlawful entry, Violent Entry and Disorderly Conduct.
7. Isaiah Giddings, member from Philadelphia, PA allegedly broke into the office of U.S. Sen. Jeff Merkley of Oregon and has been charged with Unlawful entry, Violent Entry and Disorderly Conduct.
8. Brian Healion, member from Upper Darby, PA, has also been charged with Unlawful entry, Violent Entry and Disorderly Conduct.

Other individuals with ties to the Proud Boys were charged with other offenses related to the Capitol attack are:

1. Dominic Pezzola, whose actions included filmed stealing a police riot shield and using it to smash his way into the Capitol and then pausing for a victory smoke. He was found guilty of assaulting, resisting or impeding certain officers, as well as stealing the police shield. He was sentenced to 10 years in prison.
2. William Pepe, Proud Boy who attended the January 6 attack and was charged with trespassing and impeding the orderly function of government. He was fired from his MTA position for having used sick leave to attend the rally and for having values "unacceptable and inconsistent with the MTA."
3. Lucas Denney of Kinney County, Texas founder of a group called the Patriot Boys of North Texas, meticulous and extensive planned the trip to Washington, D.C., and participated in the January 6 United States Capitol attack. A military veteran, Denney carried body armor, pepper spray, and a PVC pipe for use as a weapon. He was charged with assaulting a police officer, found guilty and sentenced to 52 months in prison.
4. Donald Hazard from Hurst, Texas is a member of a group called the Patriot Boys of North Texas. At the urging of the groups' president, Lucas Denny, Hazard traveled to Washington, D.C., and participated in the January 6 United States Capitol attack during which he attacked and injured a police officer and then bragged about it on Facebook. He was found guilty and sentenced to four years and nine months in prison.

=== Convictions for seditious conspiracy ===
Upon the request of two defendants, the trial, originally scheduled for August 8, 2022, was postponed to wait for relevant interview transcripts from the January 6 House committee. (The committee intended to write its own final report before sharing its witness testimony with the Justice Department, and thus neither the prosecutors nor the defendants' counsel expected to have access to the material until later in the year.) The government agreed to this delay as long as all five defendants could be tried together in December. Meanwhile, in October, the government extended a plea offer to all five men, which they rejected.

The trial began on December 19, 2022. U.S. district judge Timothy Kelly allowed prosecutors to play a 2020 video of Donald Trump asking the Proud Boys to "stand back and stand by." Though some of the Proud Boys defendants wanted to subpoena Trump to appear as a witness, Judge Kelly did not support the idea, and Trump never testified.

On May 4, 2023, Tarrio, Nordean, Biggs, and Rehl were convicted of seditious conspiracy, conspiracy to obstruct an official proceeding, obstruction of an official proceeding, conspiracy to prevent Members of Congress and federal law enforcement officers from discharging duties, civil disorder, and destruction of government property. Biggs was sentenced to 17 years, Rehl to 15, Nordean to 18, and Tarrio to 22.

Pezzola was acquitted of seditious conspiracy but convicted of the other serious felonies: assaulting, resisting, or impeding certain officers and robbery involving government property. He was sentenced to 10 years.

Upon Trump's inauguration on January 20, 2025, he granted "a full, complete and unconditional pardon" to everyone convicted of offenses related to the Capitol attack, who by then numbered over a thousand. The only exceptions were nine Oath Keepers (Rhodes, Meggs, Harrelson, Caldwell, Watkins, Minuta, Vallejo, Moerschel, and Hackett) and five Proud Boys (Nordean, Biggs, Rehl, Pezzola, and Bertino). These 14 people had their sentences commuted to "time served," allowing them to be released from prison immediately, but their convictions stood.

=== Lawsuit ===
On June 6, 2025, Tarrio, Nordean, Biggs, Rehl, and Pezzola, represented by Augustus Sol Invictus, sued the federal government. They sought $100 million in restitution for what they claimed had been, under the Biden administration, "egregious and systemic abuse of the legal system and the United States Constitution to punish and oppress political allies of President Trump." On June 12, Judge Daniel C. Irick ordered Invictus to prove he was still allowed to practice law in Florida's Middle District given that he had been convicted of a felony five months earlier.

== Post-2021 actions ==
=== Alabama ===
Following the 2021 Capitol attack, Enrique Tarrio was discovered to have been an informant to both federal and local law enforcement between 2012 and 2014. The Proud Boys of Alabama officially stated on Telegram regarding Tarrio, "We reject and disavow the proven federal informant, Enrique Tarrio, and any and all chapters that choose to associate with him."

=== Portland, Oregon, march ===
On August 23, 2021, the Proud Boys held a rally in Portland, Oregon, where they clashed with antifa counter-demonstrators. Alan Swinney, a Proud Boy from Texas, attended the George Floyd march in Portland, Oregon where he "calmly and dispassionately used or threatened force" by spraying marchers with mace, shooting random people with a paint ball gun, (causing one marcher to lose an eye) and threatening others with a loaded gun. He was found guilty of attempted assault, second-degree unlawful use of mace, and pointing a firearm and was sentenced to 10 years in prison.

=== Florida ===
Several members of the Proud Boys have served on the Miami-Dade Republican Executive Committee. Proud Boys have frequently participated at conservative events in Florida. Other Proud Boys in Florida have run for local office. Proud Boy James Hoel was elected to the Sarasota County Republican Executive Committee in 2022.

=== California ===
On June 12, 2022, a group identified as Proud Boys by the Alameda County Sheriff's Office stormed a children's Drag Queen Story Time event at the San Lorenzo Library. Members of the Drag Queen Story Hour described the group as reportedly "extremely aggressive", who "totally freaked out the kids" by shouting homophobic and transphobic slurs during the event. Sheriff's office is investigating the attack as a possible hate crime.

=== Split with neo-Nazis ===
In June 2023, the Global Project Against Hate and Extremism reported that 10 Proud Boy chapters, mainly sympathetic to neo-Nazi ideas, split with the national organization after a fight broke out on June 25 between a dozen members of the Proud Boys and the neo-Nazi Rose City Nationalists.

=== Trump conviction ===
Multiple chapters of the Proud Boys condemned the conviction of Donald Trump. A telegram message from one chapter simply said "War." in response to the conviction, while another called for supporters to respond and fight, also referencing Francisco Franco.

=== Second Trump inauguration ===
On January 20, 2025, the date of Donald Trump's second inauguration, a large group of Proud Boys marched through the streets of Washington, DC, wearing black and yellow attire. Their chants included "Free our boys" and "51st state", a reference to Trump's remarks about annexing Canada. Later that day, Trump commuted the sentences of those convicted of seditious conspiracy, and granted "a full, complete and unconditional pardon to all other individuals convicted of offenses related to events that occurred at or near the United States Capitol on January 6, 2021".

=== Twelve-Day War ===
On June 18, 2025 the Proud Boys account on Telegram wrote that voters who had been motivated by Trump's "America First" campaign slogan would drop their support for him "if the United States gets directly involved in the Israel-Iran conflict".

== Response ==
=== Government ===
==== United States ====
In late November 2018, an internal memo from the Clark County Sheriff's Office showed that the FBI had designated the Proud Boys an extremist group, but it later clarified that only certain members were extremist threats with ties to white nationalism.

In 2019, the 22-page Violent Extremism in Colorado: a Reference Guide for Law Enforcement from the Colorado Information Analysis Center (the state's version of the DHS) and the Colorado Department of Public Safety was released, with the organizations discussing the Proud Boys under the "White Supremacist Extremism" heading. In coverage from The Guardian, it was reported that member organizations of the national network of counter-terrorist centers had issued warnings about the Proud Boys. Calling Proud Boys a "threat to Colorado", the guide related them to neo-Nazi terrorist group Atomwaffen Division and how violent clashes in 2018 with the Rocky Mountain Antifa ended in the arrest of two members of the Proud Boys. Guidance about the Proud Boys in the report involved describing them as "a dangerous white supremacist group", as a white supremacist extremist threat, and with a "concern that white supremacist extremists will continue attacking members of the community who threaten their belief of Caucasian superiority".

Also in 2019, the Austin Regional Intelligence Center (ARIC) compiled a Special Event Threat Assessment of potential dangers to the Austin Pride Parade. The ARIC identified the Proud Boys as being associated with a "growing backlash against Pride Month" which has emerged in the form of the straight pride movement, noting that a June 2019 transgender pride event in Seattle, Washington was disrupted by the "alt-right Proud Boys organization".

==== Canada ====
Bill Blair, Canada's minister of public safety and emergency preparedness, announced in January 2021 that Canada was considering designating the Proud Boys a terrorist organization.

On January 25, 2021, the House of Commons of Canada unanimously passed a motion calling on the government "to use all available tools to address the proliferation of white supremacist and hate groups, starting with immediately designating the Proud Boys as a terrorist entity."

On February 3, 2021, the Proud Boys were officially designated as a terrorist entity in Canada. Bill Blair, the Minister of Public Safety added 13 new groups (including four ideologically motivated violent extremist groups, Atomwaffen Division, the Base, the Russian Imperial Movement, and the Proud Boys) to the Criminal Code list of terrorist entities.

Section 83.01(1) of the Canadian criminal code defines a terrorist entity as "a) an entity that has as one of its purposes or activities facilitating or carrying out any terrorist activity, or b) a listed entity, and includes an association of such entities." A listed entity means an entity on a list established by the Governor in Council under section 83.05. The Cabinet of Canada can list an entity on the recommendation of the Minister of Public Safety and Emergency Preparedness if the Governor in Council is satisfied that there are reasonable grounds to believe that (a) the entity has knowingly carried out, attempted to carry out, participated in or facilitated a terrorist activity; or (b) the entity has knowingly acted on behalf of, at the direction of or in association with an entity referred to in paragraph (a).

Under section 83 of the Criminal Code, it is an indictable offense to provide use or possess property for terrorist purposes. As a result of the listing, no person in Canada or Canadian outside Canada can knowingly deal with the property, provide financial services or facilitate any transaction for the group. Financial institutions cannot process payments or offer loans to known members, and are required to report property or transactions to regulators. The listing does not mean the group is banned or that membership is a crime. Membership of the Proud Boys is not criminalized. Providing property or financial services to a listed entity is a crime, which makes paying membership dues to the group a terrorism offense in Canada. Purchasing Proud Boys merchandise could be a criminal act, and travel restrictions may apply to people associated with the group. Additionally, participation and contribution where the purpose of this participation is to enhance the latter's ability to facilitate or carry out a terrorist activity is also criminalized. Such behavior includes recruitment of trainees, crossing an international border, and providing or offering to provide skill or expertise.

Proud Boys Canada announced that it was dissolving on May 2, 2021, and denied that it was a terrorist or white supremacy group. Analysts cautioned that the group may opt to rebrand within Canada and noted that one Proud Boys chapter based in Hamilton, Ontario, started to use the name "Canada First".

==== New Zealand ====
In late June 2022, Police Commissioner Andrew Coster and Prime Minister Jacinda Ardern designated the Proud Boys and another far right group called The Base as terrorist organizations. As a result of the terror designation, anyone with property or financial dealings with these organizations face prosecution and up to seven years imprisonment under the Terrorism Suppression Act.

In early July 2025, Radio New Zealand reported that the New Zealand Government had decided not to renew the Proud Boys' terrorist designation after a three year period, allowing it to expire in June 2025. The Prime Minister's office stated that the NZ government was still monitoring the group's activities in New Zealand.

=== Southern Poverty Law Center lawsuit ===
Although he had supposedly cut his ties with the Proud Boys by November 2018, stepping down as chairman, McInnes filed a defamation lawsuit in February 2019 against the Southern Poverty Law Center (SPLC) in federal court in Alabama over the SPLC's designation of the Proud Boys as a "general hate" group. The SPLC took the lawsuit "as a compliment" and an indication that "we're doing our job." On its website, the SPLC said that "McInnes plays a duplicitous rhetorical game: rejecting white nationalism and, in particular, the term 'alt-right' while espousing some of its central tenets" and that the group's "rank-and-file [members] and leaders regularly spout white nationalist memes and maintain affiliations with known extremists. They are known for anti-Muslim and misogynistic rhetoric. Proud Boys have appeared alongside other hate groups at extremist gatherings like the Unite the Right rally in Charlottesville." McInnes is represented by Ronald Coleman. In addition to defamation, McInnes claimed tortious interference with economic advantage, "false light invasion of privacy" and "aiding and abetting employment discrimination." The day after filing the suit, McInnes announced that he had been re-hired by the Canadian far-right media group The Rebel Media. The SPLC filed a motion to dismiss the lawsuit in April 2019. McInnes lost his defamation lawsuit in October 2025.

=== Lawsuits ===
On May 17, 2019, Bill Burke of Ohio filed a $3 million lawsuit against the Proud Boys, Kessler, and multiple other people and groups associated with the Unite the Right rally. Burke was seriously injured in the August 2017 Charlottesville car attack which followed the event. The 64-page initial complaint alleges that the named parties "conspired to plan, promote and carry out the violent events in Charlottesville". According to Burke, his physical and mental injuries have led to "severe psychological and emotional suffering".

=== Social media bans ===
The Proud Boys organization has been banned by Facebook, Instagram, Twitter, and YouTube.

== Subgroups ==
=== Fraternal Order of the Alt-Knights ===
In 2017, Kyle Chapman, nicknamed "Based Stickman" after the 2017 Berkeley protests, formed a paramilitary wing of the Proud Boys called the Fraternal Order of the Alt-Knights (FOAK). Alt-right figure Augustus Sol Invictus acted as FOAK's second-in-command until he left the group.

=== Canadian chapters ===
Following the attack on the United States Capitol, the Ottawa and Manitoba chapters shut down. On May 2, 2021, Proud Boys Canada announced on the Proud Boys USA channel on Telegram that it has "officially dissolved".

== Symbolism ==
Members of the Proud Boys can be identified by their use of black and yellow Fred Perry polo shirts, American flags, MAGA hats, and military armor. Members often carry guns. An ironic catchphrase used by Proud Boys is uhuru, which means 'freedom' in the Swahili language.

During the 2021 attack on the United States Capitol, the Proud Boys shifted to wearing blaze orange hats and all-black attire.

=== Fred Perry shirts ===
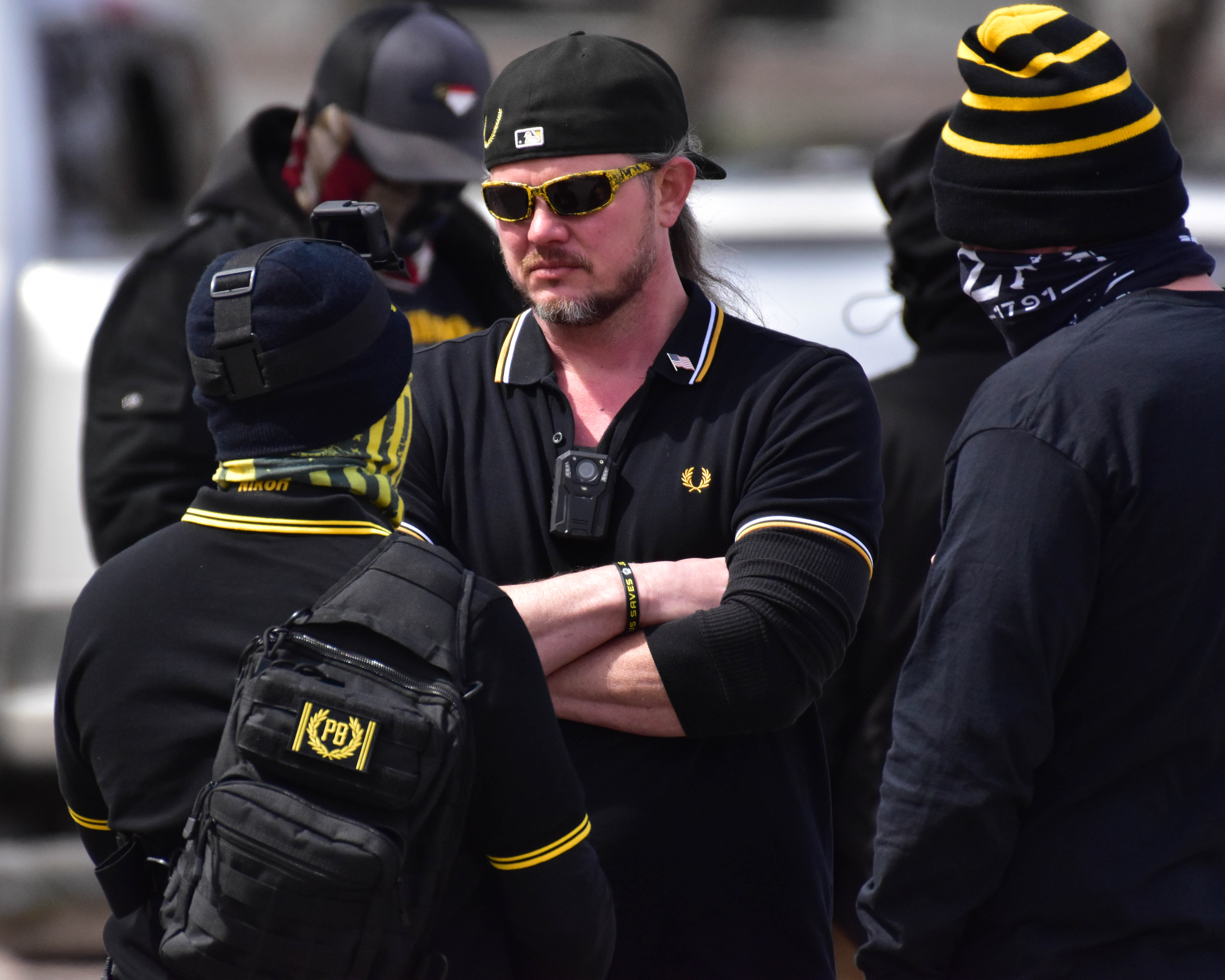
Proud Boys in Fred Perry polo shirts in 2021

Since the early days of the group, Proud Boys have worn black and yellow polo shirts of the British clothing brand Fred Perry on McInnes' suggestion. The brand, having previously been negatively associated with skinheads and the British National Front in the 1970s, issued several public statements distancing themselves from the beliefs of the Proud Boys, and calling on members to stop wearing their clothing.

In 2017, Fred Perry's CEO John Flynn denounced the affiliation with the Proud Boys in a statement to CBC Radio, saying: "We don't support the ideals or the group that you speak of. It is counter to our beliefs and the people we work with." The shirts have not been sold in the United States since September 2019. In September 2020, the retailer announced that it will not sell them in the United States and Canada until association with Proud Boys has ended.

=== MAGA hats ===
Proud Boys commonly wear red MAGA hats to rallies.

=== 6MWE ===
On December 15, 2020, a photograph spread online of a Proud Boy wearing a variety of antisemitic, Neo-Nazi slogan imagery. "6MWE" means "6 Million Wasn't Enough" in reference to Jewish Holocaust victims. The yellow eagle holding a fasces (or bundle of sticks) is a symbol taken from Fascist Italy, while the skull mask is drawn from the Neo-Nazi group Atomwaffen Division.

By December 15, 2020, Proud Boy members were being photographed wearing apparel featuring the antisemitic, Neo-Nazi slogan "6MWE". The acronym means "6 million wasn't enough", referring to the number of Jewish Holocaust victims. The slogan was accompanied by an Eagle symbol used by the Fascist government of Italy supported by Nazi Germany. The image, which spread on Twitter, prompted the Anti-Defamation League to declare that "Proud Boys' Bigotry is on Full Display"

On a January 7, 2021, MSNBC's The Last Word with Lawrence O'Donnell incorrectly reported that image had been taken during the January 6 United States Capitol attack; However, a fact check done by The Forward confirmed that the image had been taken at an earlier Proud Boys gathering at the Capitol in December 2020.

== See also ==
- List of designated terrorist groups
- List of organizations designated by the Southern Poverty Law Center as hate groups
- Radical right (United States)
