= Kaneohe Bay Dawgs =

- 1997; Oahu, Hawaii

Minor league affiliations
- Class: Winter Baseball
- League: Hawaii Winter Baseball (1997)

Major league affiliations
- Team: None

Minor league titles
- League titles (0): None

Team data
- Name: Kaneohe Bay Dawgs (1997)
- Ballpark: Kaneohe Marine Corps Base-Hawaii (1997)

The Kaneohe Bay Dawgs were a planned expansion Hawaii Winter Baseball team based in the Kaneohe Bay area of Oahu, Hawaii. The Kaneohe Bay Dawgs franchise folded before playing the 1996–1997 winter league season.

== History ==
In August, 1996, during the Hawaii Winter Baseball conference at the Japanese Cultural Center of Hawaii, league officials announced the Kaneohe Bay Dawgs and Kona Man O'Wars as expansion franchises into the Hawaii Winter Baseball league. The two franchises were planned to begin play as members of the 1996–1997 Hawaii Winter Baseball League, expanding the league from four teams to six teams. The two expansion franchises were added because of increased interest from Major League Baseball and the Japanese and Korean pro leagues to send players to the Hawaii developmental league. With the expansion teams added, the league teams were scheduled to play a 54–game schedule.

The Kaneohe franchise announcement was rescinded in October, 1996 and the franchise never materialized. League play was scheduled to begin on October 11, 1996. The Kona Man O'Wars franchise also did not proceed to play in the upcoming season.

The franchise folded due to logistical and legal problems with the Kaneohe Bay Dawgs playing home games on the Kaneohe Marine Corps Base-Hawaii military base as had been planned. Without a home ballpark, the planned franchise was dissolved just before the start of the winter league play.

Hawaii Winter League baseball folded after the 1997 winter season with the Hilo Stars, Honolulu Sharks, Maui Stingrays and West Oahu CaneFires playing the season as members.

== The ballpark ==
The Kaneohe Bay Dawgs were scheduled to play home games at the Kaneohe Marine Corps Base-Hawaii.

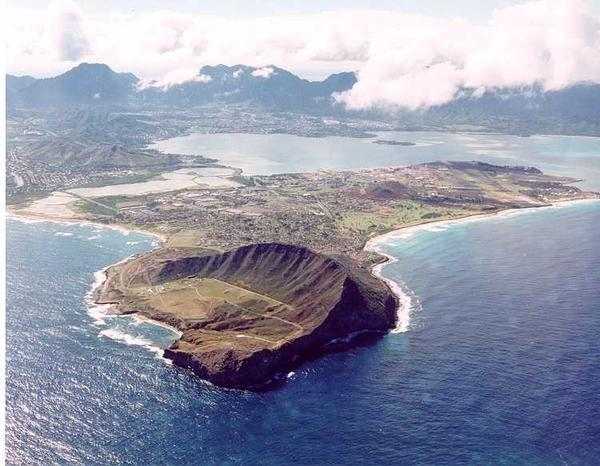
Aerial photograph of Marine Corps Base Hawaii

== Timeline ==
Year(s)	# Yrs.	Team	Level	League
1997	1	Kaneohe Bay Dawgs	Winter Baseball	Hawaii Winter Baseball

== Notable alumni ==
- There was no roster formed for the 1997 Kanehoe Bay Dawgs.
