= Tyler Herron =

American baseball player (1986–2021)

- Pitcher
- Born: August 5, 1986; West Palm Beach, Florida, U.S.
- Died: October 22, 2021 (aged 35); Wellington, Florida, U.S.
- Batted: Right Threw: Right
- Stats at Baseball Reference

Tyler Daschiel Herron (August 5, 1986 – October 22, 2021) was an American right-handed professional baseball pitcher.

As a senior at Wellington High School in Florida, Herron led the nation with a 0.25 ERA. He was drafted by the St. Louis Cardinals in the First Round of the 2005 Major League Baseball draft. Herron was ranked the Midwest League # 11 prospect in 2007, and the St. Louis Cardinals # 10 prospect, by Baseball America. He pitched for the Honolulu Sharks in the Rookie 2008 Hawaii Winter Baseball League, and led the league with a 0.69 ERA. Pitching for the Indios de Mayagüez in the winter of 2014, he was a post-season Puerto Rico Liga de Béisbol Profesional Roberto Clemente All Star and a Caribbean World Series All Star. He pitched as high as Triple–A in 2014 and 2016, for the Washington Nationals and New York Mets farm teams. In 2016, pitching for the Fargo-Moorhead RedHawks, he led the independent American Association with a 0.80 ERA.

Herron pitched for Team Israel at the 2017 World Baseball Classic.

In total, at all levels he pitched 16 seasons, and had a record of 103-95. Herron died on October 22, 2021, aged 35.

== Early life ==
Herron was born and grew up in West Palm Beach, Florida. He later lived in Wellington, Florida. He was of Puerto Rican descent, and one of his grandmothers was Jewish—as a result of which he was eligible to play for Team Israel.

He attended Wellington High School, in Wellington, Florida. Initially, in high school Herron played shortstop and third base. As a senior for the Wellington Wolverines, Herron led the nation with a 0.25 ERA, and struck out 81 batters in 57 innings. He was named to the 2005 ABCA/Rawlings High School All-America Second Team, along with among others future major leaguers Ike Davis and Scott Van Slyke.

== Career ==
=== St. Louis Cardinals ===
Herron was drafted by the St. Louis Cardinals in the first round (46th, overall) of the 2005 Major League Baseball draft. His agent was Jim Munsey, his former T-ball pitcher. He received a $675,000 signing bonus.

He began his professional career in 2005 with the Johnson City Cardinals of the Rookie Appalachian League, going 0–3 in 13 starts with a 5.62 ERA and 49 strikeouts in 49 2/3 innings as he kept opponents to a .245 batting average. Herron was ranked the Appalachian League # 20 prospect, and the St. Louis Cardinals # 12 prospect, in 2005 by Baseball America.

The following season, pitching for Johnson City, on August 13, 2006, Herron was voted Appalachian League Pitcher of the Week. In 13 starts for Johnson City he was 5–6 with one complete game and a 4.13 ERA, and he lost his one start with the State College Spikes of the Low–A New York-Penn League while giving up two runs in six innings. He was ranked the Appalachian League # 13 prospect, and the St. Louis Cardinals # 18 prospect, in 2006 by Baseball America. Pitching for Johnson City and State College, he averaged 8.88 strikeouts per nine innings pitched, third-best among Cardinals' minor leaguers.

In June 2007, pitching for the Single–A Swing of the Quad Cities, Herron was named Cardinals Minor League Pitcher of the Month. On July 2, 2007, Herron was voted Midwest League Pitcher of the Week. For the season he was 10–7 with a 3.74 ERA, and in 137 1/3 innings gave up 26 walks while he had 130 strikeouts (6th in the league) as he kept opponents to a .240 batting average. He averaged 1.69 walks per nine innings as a starter, which was 4th-lowest among Midwest League starters, and his strikeout/walk ratio of 5.00 led the league. He threw primarily a mid-90s sinking fastball, a solid changeup, and a curveball with a good break. He was ranked the Midwest League # 11 prospect in 2007, and the St. Louis Cardinals # 10 prospect, by Baseball America.

Pitching for the High–A Palm Beach Cardinals, on August 4, 2008, Herron was voted Florida State League Pitcher of the Week. For the season for the team, he was 2–2 with a 2.70 ERA in 15 starts, and in 56 2/3 innings he gave up 11 walks as he kept opponents to a .234 batting average. Pitching for the Springfield Cardinals of the Double–A Texas League, Herron was 5–5 with a 5.20 ERA. He was ranked the St. Louis Cardinals # 23 prospect after the 2008 season by Baseball America. He pitched for the Honolulu Sharks in the Rookie 2008 Hawaii Winter Baseball League, and led the league with a 0.69 ERA.

Pitching for the Springfield Cardinals in 2009 he was 2–4 with a 4.34 ERA in 9 starts. Herron was released by the Cardinals organization on June 3, 2009.

=== Pittsburgh Pirates ===
On June 12, 2009, Herron signed a minor league contract with the Pittsburgh Pirates. Pitching the remainder of the season for the Altoona Curve of the Double–A Eastern League, he was 0–2 with a 4.50 ERA. He was released by the Pirates organization on October 30.

=== Kalamazoo Kings ===
In 2010, Herron pitched for the Kalamazoo Kings in the independent Frontier League, primarily as a reliever, throwing between 89 and 93 mph with his fastball, and was 1-3 with three saves and a 3.50 ERA. He did not pitch in 2011 due to rehabilitation from surgery for an arm injury.

=== Fargo-Moorhead RedHawks ===
In 2012, Herron pitched for the Fargo-Moorhead Redhawks of the independent American Association, going 12–3 with a 3.29 ERA (6th in the league) in 23 games (17 starts) over 123 innings with 105 strikeouts (6th in the league) and 30 walks. His 12 wins tied for second-best in the league, and his strikeouts/walks ratio of 3.50 was 7th-best in the league.

=== Washington Nationals ===
On December 7, 2012, the Washington Nationals signed Herron as a free agent to a minor league contract. In 2013, he pitched for the Potomac Nationals of the High–A Carolina League, for whom he was 1–1 with one save and a 1.70 ERA. Herron struck out 32 batters in 20 1/3 innings as he kept opponents to a .222 batting average. With the Harrisburg Senators of the Double–A Eastern League, he was 6–2 with five saves and a 3.11 ERA as he struck out 58 batters in 46 1/3 innings and kept opponents to a .247 batting average.

Pitching for the Indios de Mayagüez in the winter of 2013, in the Puerto Rico Liga de Béisbol Profesional Roberto Clemente, in 19 games (third in the league) in relief Herron was 1–0 with 12 saves and a 0.84 ERA (leading the league, for all pitchers with 20 or more innings pitched).

In 2014, Herron returned to Double–A Harrisburg, for whom he was 3–2 with six saves and a 2.73 ERA in 48 relief appearances (tied for 6th in the league), and also pitched for the Syracuse Chiefs of the Triple–A International League (for whom he pitched 1 2/3 innings).

Pitching for the Indios de Mayagüez in the winter of 2014, he was a post-season Puerto Rico Liga de Béisbol Profesional Roberto Clemente All Star. Pitching for Puerto Rico in 2014, Herron was a Caribbean World Series All Star.

=== Fargo-Moorhead RedHawks (second stint) ===
In 2015, Herron pitched for the Fargo-Moorhead RedHawks of the American Association, and was 6–7 with a 4.47 ERA in 20 starts, tied for second in the league with four complete games and two shutouts, and was third in the American Association with 119 strikeouts in 131 innings. Pitching for the Indios de Mayagüez in the Puerto Rico Liga de Béisbol Profesional Roberto Clemente in the winter of 2015, he was 5–2 with a 1.96 ERA in 18 relief appearances.

In 2016, Herron returned to Fargo-Moorhead, and led the American Association with a 0.80 ERA in 56 innings in which he walked 12 batters, had a 5–1 record with two shutouts, and held opponents to a .161 batting average.

=== New York Mets ===
On June 28, 2016, Herron signed a minor league contract with the New York Mets. He spent the remainder of the campaign with the Binghamton Mets of the Double–A Eastern League, for whom he was 2–6 with a 6.32 ERA in 11 starts, and the Las Vegas 51s of the Triple–A Pacific Coast League, for whom he was 1–0 with a 2.70 ERA. Herron elected free agency following the season on November 7.

=== Tigres de Quintana Roo ===
On March 28, 2017, Herron signed with the Tigres de Quintana Roo of the Mexican League. He made 12 starts, finishing with a record of 3–5 and a 5.52 ERA before he was released on June 11.

=== Fargo-Moorhead RedHawks (third stint) ===
Herron re-signed with the Fargo-Moorhead RedHawks of the American Association on June 20, 2017, and logged a 9-3 record with three complete games and an ERA of 2.92.

=== Lincoln Saltdogs ===
On January 30, 2018, Herron was traded to the Lincoln Saltdogs of the American Association of Independent Professional Baseball. Pitching for Lincoln in the first half of 2018, he registered a 4-5 record and a 7.33 ERA.

=== Winnipeg Goldeyes ===
On July 12, 2018, Herron was claimed off waivers by the Winnipeg Goldeyes of the American Association. Pitching for Goldeyes in 2018, he compiled a 2-4 record with two complete games, one shutout, and a 3.19 ERA in 36 2/3 innings. He was released following the conclusion of the 2018 season.

=== High Point Rockers ===
On May 1, 2019, Herron signed with the High Point Rockers of the Atlantic League of Professional Baseball. In 17 starts for the team, he was 2–7 with a 6.05 ERA over 93 2/3 innings.

=== Sioux Falls Canaries ===
On July 31, 2019, he was traded to the Sioux Falls Canaries of the American Association of Independent Professional Baseball. In seven starts for the team, he was 1-3 with one complete game and a 3.78 ERA over 50 innings. Herron was released by the Canaries on February 4, 2020. However, he later re-signed with the team on May 21. In 2020 for the Canaries, Herron posted a 7-1 record with one complete game and a 4.60 ERA in 76 1/3 innings, while also serving as the team’s bench coach.

On May 4, 2021, Herron was released by the Canaries.

=== Fargo-Moorhead RedHawks (fourth stint) ===
On June 15, 2021, Herron signed with the Fargo-Moorhead RedHawks of the American Association of Professional Baseball. Herron struggled to a 15.26 ERA in 3 appearances, in which he pitched a total of 7 2/3 innings. Herron was released by the RedHawks on June 30.

Herron's career eight-season minor league record was 38–41, with a 4.12 ERA, and 588 strikeouts in 667 innings. His career foreign league record over nine seasons was 16–13 with a 3.77 ERA, and 192 strikeouts in 234 innings. In addition, his career independent league record over 10 seasons was 49–41, with a 4.03 ERA, with 640 strikeouts over 800 2/3 innings. In total, at all levels he pitched 16 seasons facing 7,323 batters, had a record of 103-95 with 38 saves and a 4.10 ERA, and 1,420 strikeouts in 1701 2/3 innings.

=== World Baseball Classic ===
Herron was on the roster for Israel at the 2017 World Baseball Classic qualifier, but did not pitch.

Herron pitched for Team Israel at the 2017 World Baseball Classic in March 2017. He said it was: "The best experience I've ever had in baseball for sure... It was the coolest experience I've ever had."

== Death ==
Herron died of unknown causes at his apartment in Wellington, Florida on October 22, 2021, aged 35.
