= Mike Lum =

American baseball player (born 1945)

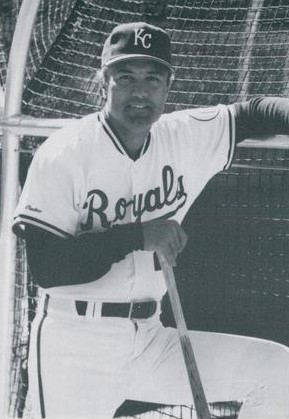
- Outfielder / First baseman
- Born: October 27, 1945 (age 80); Honolulu, Hawaii, U.S.
- Batted: Left Threw: Left

MLB debut
- September 12, 1967, for the Atlanta Braves

Last MLB appearance
- September 30, 1981, for the Chicago Cubs

MLB statistics
- Batting average: .247
- Home runs: 90
- Runs batted in: 431

NPB statistics
- Batting average: .269
- Home runs: 12
- Runs batted in: 46
- Stats at Baseball Reference

Teams
- Atlanta Braves (1967–1975); Cincinnati Reds (1976–1978); Atlanta Braves (1978–1981); Chicago Cubs (1981); Yokohama Taiyo Whales (1982)

Career highlights and awards
- World Series champion (1976)

Michael Ken-Wai Lum (born October 27, 1945) is an American former professional baseball outfielder and first baseman. He played in Major League Baseball (MLB) for the Atlanta Braves, Cincinnati Reds, and Chicago Cubs, and in Nippon Professional Baseball (NPB) for the Yokohama Taiyo Whales. Lum became the first American of Japanese ancestry to play in MLB.

== Early years ==
Lum was born in Honolulu, Hawaii to a Japanese woman and an American soldier and was adopted as a baby by a Chinese couple, Mun Luke and Winnifred Lum. He became a star left-handed quarterback at President Theodore Roosevelt High School, winning the Interscholastic League of Honolulu's Back of the Year award in 1962. He attracted interest from Michigan State University and attended Brigham Young University on a football scholarship for one semester in the fall of 1963 after having signed with the Milwaukee Braves as an amateur free agent back in June.

A speedy runner, Lum was converted to an outfielder in the Braves' organization after having played first base in high school. He logged just a .925 fielding percentage his first professional season with the Waycross Braves Georgia–Florida League, but his defense steadily improved over his five seasons in the minors.

== Atlanta Braves ==
Making his major league debut as a pinch hitter on September 12, 1967, Lum singled in his first major league at-bat against the New York Mets' Jack Fisher. With the Braves trailing 3-2 in the ninth inning, Lum scored the game-tying run in a 4-3 victory. He started the second game of a September 17 double header in center field, and remained the team's starting center fielder over the remainder of the season.

With starting left fielder Rico Carty out for the 1968 season with tuberculosis, Lum platooned with Tito Francona in left, while occasionally spelling a day off for Hank Aaron in right and Felipe Alou in center. He remained a reserve when Carty returned in 1969, and reached the post-season for the first time in his career, as the Braves won the National League West by three games over the San Francisco Giants. Lum went two-for-two with a double in the 1969 National League Championship Series against the New York Mets.

Lum hit three home runs and drove in five of the eight runs the Braves scored against the San Diego Padres on July 3, 1970. He finally earned a starting job in right field in 1971 when Aaron took over as the first baseman. The Braves platooned Lum with Ralph Garr in right field in 1972. In 1973, Aaron went back to the outfield, and Lum got most of his playing time at first base. He batted a career-high .294, while also logging career highs in home runs (16), runs batted in (82), runs scored (74), extra base hits (48), and at-bats (513). After two more seasons as a fourth outfielder and back-up first baseman, Lum was acquired by the defending World Series champion Cincinnati Reds for Darrel Chaney.

== Cincinnati Reds ==
Playing time was hard to come by for the "spare parts" of the "Big Red Machine." Lum saw less playing time in Cincinnati than he was used to, averaging 156 plate appearances per season in three years with the Reds. In 1976, he reached the post-season for the second time in his career, with one at-bat in the 1976 National League Championship Series with the Philadelphia Phillies, flying out in game three to end the seventh inning. He did not play in the World Series against the New York Yankees.

Following the 1978 season, Lum took part in a tour of Japan with the Reds. Aware that Lum was to become a free agent, the Seibu Lions offered him a three-year deal worth a million dollars. He declined and signed instead with the Braves.

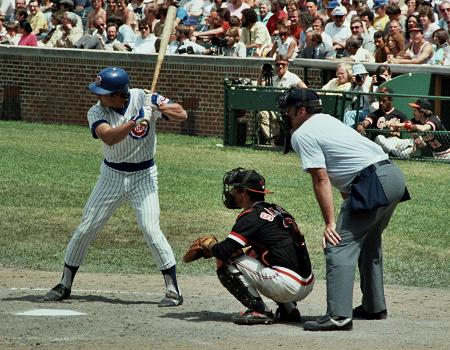
Lum with the Chicago Cubs in 1981

== Return to Atlanta ==
Lum began the 1979 season as the Braves' starting first baseman, however, star catcher Dale Murphy was moved to first base at the start of May, removing Lum from the starting line-up. Relegated to pinch hitting duties, Lum led the National League with seventeen. He remained in that role until his release on May 1, 1981. He signed with the Chicago Cubs shortly afterwards; on August 12, he clubbed a two-run home run off Terry Leach of the New York Mets for the 100th pinch hit of his career.

== Career stats ==
Games	PA	AB	Runs	Hits	2B	3B	HR	RBI	SB	BB	SO	Avg.	OBP	OF Fld%	1B Fld%
1517	4001	3554	404	877	128	20	90	431	13	366	506	.247	.319	.986	.993

Lum batted .246 as a pinch hitter over his career. On May 22, 1969, Lum cracked a two-run double off the New York Mets' Al Jackson as a pinch hitter for Hank Aaron, making him one of six players ever to pinch hit for Aaron. Lee Maye did so in 1962 and Johnny Blanchard in 1965. Johnny Briggs, Marty Perez, and Mike Hegan did it after Lum.

== Coaching ==
Lum joined the Yokohama Taiyo Whales in 1982, and batted .269 with twelve home runs and 46 RBIs. Following his one season in Japan, Hank Aaron, at that time the Braves' minor-league farm director, invited Lum to coach with the Anderson Braves of the South Atlantic League.

He jumped to the Chicago White Sox in 1984. Following the passing of hitting coach Charley Lau, Lum assisted his replacement, Joe Nossek, over the rest of the season. The job was Lum's alone in 1985. The team won eleven more games, drove in 55 more runs, and had a higher batting average than the year before.

He joined the San Francisco Giants in 1986 as a roving instructor and held the same job with the Kansas City Royals in 1987. He served as the Royals' hitting coach in 1988 and 1989 before returning to the White Sox in 1990 as minor-league hitting coordinator. He remained at that post through 2005. In 2006 he joined the Milwaukee Brewers as hitting coach for the Class A South Atlantic League's West Virginia Power, and was named South Atlantic League "Coach of the Year."

When the Hawaii Winter League resumed play in 2006 after eight inactive seasons, Lum joined the North Shore Honu for a year before returning to the Brewers as their minor-league hitting coordinator. In 2010, he joined the Pittsburgh Pirates as hitting coach for the Gulf Coast League Pirates.
