= Jeremy Bleich =

American baseball player & coach (born 1987)

- Pitcher / Coach
- Born: June 18, 1987 (age 39); Metairie, Louisiana, U.S.
- Batted: Left Threw: Left

MLB debut
- July 13, 2018, for the Oakland Athletics

Last MLB appearance
- July 20, 2018, for the Oakland Athletics

MLB statistics
- Win–loss record: 0–0
- Earned run average: 54.00
- Strikeouts: 1
- Stats at Baseball Reference

Teams
- As player: Oakland Athletics (2018); As coach: Pittsburgh Pirates (2020–2025)

Jeremy Bleich (pronounced BLYSH; Hebrew: ג'רמי בלייך; born June 18, 1987) is an American-Israeli former professional baseball pitcher who currently serves as an assistant general manager for the Arizona Diamondbacks of Major League Baseball (MLB). He also pitches for Team Israel. He played in MLB for the Oakland Athletics in 2018.

In high school, Bleich was named a 2005 first-team All-American by Collegiate Baseball (Louisville Slugger), a third-team All American by Baseball America, and was twice named All-State in Louisiana. He was profiled by author Michael Lewis in his short book Coach: Lessons on the Game of Life, published in 2005. He was named a Cape Cod Baseball League All-Star in 2006.

Bleich was selected in the First Round of the 2008 Major League Baseball draft (44th overall) by the New York Yankees, out of Stanford University. He was named a Hawaii Winter Baseball post-season All-Star in 2008, had surgery to repair a torn glenoid labrum in his throwing shoulder in 2010, and was named the Eastern League Pitcher of the Week on May 26, 2014. Bleich pitched for Team Israel in the 2017 World Baseball Classic qualifier, and for Team Israel at the 2017 World Baseball Classic. He made his major league debut in 2018.

He pitched for Team Israel in the 2019 European Baseball Championship. He also pitched for the team at the Africa/Europe 2020 Olympic Qualification tournament in Italy in September 2019, which Israel won to qualify to play baseball at the 2020 Summer Olympics. He pitched for Team Israel at the 2020 Summer Olympics in Tokyo in the summer of 2021.

== Early and personal life ==
Bleich was born in Metairie, Louisiana, a suburb 15 minutes west of New Orleans, to Stan (a cardiologist and Chair of the board of cardiology at East Jefferson General Hospital, who grew up in Brooklyn) and Caron Bleich. Bleich is Jewish, grew up in a Conservative Jewish home with Orthodox Jewish grandparents, had a bar mitzvah and went to Israel on Birthright, and is a member of Shir Chadash Conservative Congregation. His paternal grandparents George (from Poland) and Yolanda Bleich (from an area of Czechoslovakia that is now Ukraine; seven of her siblings were killed) were Auschwitz concentration camp Holocaust survivors. He said: "it’s something I feel ... defines me.... It gives you a foundation for some of the struggles you go through, gives you perspective in the moment."

He has a sister (Dr. Lauren Feldman), and a brother (Dr. Steven Bleich). Remarking on how his father and siblings are all doctors, Bleich noted: "I always tell people I'm the black sheep of the family." He is close friends with former outfielder Sam Fuld, whom he credits with being a great sounding board throughout his career.

== High school ==
He attended Isidore Newman School in New Orleans, graduating in 2005. As a sophomore Bleich was 9–3, striking out 100 batters in 71.0 innings while batting .318. As a junior, he was 7–3 with a 1.25 ERA, and 110 strikeouts in 72.2 innings, while also batting .464. As a senior, he was 7–1 with an 0.56 ERA, and 138 strikeouts in 63.0 innings, while batting .387. In high school by his junior year he had what author Michael Lewis described as "a decent fastball, great command, a big-league change-up and charm to burn", and had over 40 colleges recruiting him.

Bleich was named a 2005 first-team All-American by Collegiate Baseball (Louisville Slugger), a third-team All American by Baseball America, and the 2005 All-Metro Player of the Year. He was named All-State in Louisiana twice, was the 2004 and 2005 District Most Valuable Player, and in 2003–05 was named a three-time All-District, All-Metro, and All-Orleans teams player. As a pitcher at Isidore Newman, he was profiled by author Michael Lewis in his short book Coach: Lessons on the Game of Life, published in 2005.

He played in the 2004 WWBA World Championships with the Cincinnati Reds scout team, and in the 2005 High School All-American Game, in Albuquerque, New Mexico. He was rated the 97th-best prospect in the nation in 2005.

== College career ==
Bleich then attended Stanford University, majoring in economics. As a freshman in 2006, throwing an 88–92 mph fastball, a breaking ball, and a changeup, he tied for fourth in the Pac-10 with seven saves. He was named a Cape Cod Baseball League All-Star in 2006, pitching for the Wareham Gatemen. Baseball America named him the 19th-best player in the league.

As a sophomore in 2007, he was 10th in the Pac-10 in starts (16) and innings pitched (98.2). As a junior in 2008 during which he missed two months with tendinitis in his elbow, he was 3–3 record with one save and a 2.09 ERA, leading the team in ERA, and earned honorable mention Pac-10 All-Academic honors.

== Professional career ==
=== New York Yankees ===
==== Minor leagues ====
Bleich was selected in the First Round of the 2008 Major League Baseball draft (44th overall) by the New York Yankees out of Stanford, and received a $700,000 signing bonus. Baseball America named him the Yankees' ninth-best prospect for 2010. He was named a Hawaii Winter Baseball post-season All-Star in 2008, pitching for the Waikiki BeachBoys, for whom he was 3–1 with a 1.77 ERA (2nd in the league among starters) in 7 starts. He then pitched in one game that season for the Staten Island Yankees of the Low–A New York-Penn League. In 2009, he pitched for the Tampa Yankees of the High–A Florida State League, and for the Trenton Thunder of the Double–A Eastern League, starting 27 games.

Bleich had surgery to repair a torn glenoid labrum in his throwing shoulder, after starting 8 games for Trenton in 2010. He then missed part of the 2010 season, and all of the 2011 season.

In 2012, he was 2–1 with a 2.76 ERA as he pitched in 16 games for the GCL Yankees of the rookie–level Gulf Coast League, the Staten Island Yankees, and the Tampa Yankees. He was named the 2012 Minor League Comeback Player of the Year by Jewish Baseball News. In 2013, he was again 2–1 with a 2.76 ERA, this time for Trenton in 27 games, 4 of them starts.

Bleich began the 2014 season pitching for Trenton, for whom he started 15 games, and was named the Eastern League Pitcher of the Week on May 26, 2014. He was promoted to Triple-A for the first time later that season, and pitched for the Scranton/Wilkes-Barre RailRiders of the International League.

=== Pittsburgh Pirates ===
On November 18, 2014, Bleich signed a minor league deal with the Pittsburgh Pirates organization. In 2015, he pitched in one game for the Bradenton Marauders of the High–A Florida State League, made 25 relief appearances and had 4 saves for the Altoona Curve of the Double–A Eastern League, and had a 2.60 ERA in 13 relief appearances for the Indianapolis Indians of the Triple–A International League.

=== Philadelphia Phillies ===
On January 25, 2016, Bleich signed a minor league contract with the Philadelphia Phillies. That season he pitched for the Reading Fightin Phils in the Double–A Eastern League, and the Lehigh Valley IronPigs in the Triple–A International League.

=== Somerset Patriots ===
Bleich signed with the Somerset Patriots of the Atlantic League of Professional Baseball on July 28, 2016, and went 2–2 with a 2.45 ERA in 17 relief appearances. In 22 innings, Bleich struck out 28 batters and allowed up 3 walks.

=== Los Angeles Dodgers ===
On February 17, 2017, Bleich signed a minor league contract with the Arizona Diamondbacks. Bleich was released on the last day of spring training. Bleich was signed again by the Somerset Patriots in April 2017. He pitched 2 1/3 scoreless innings, over two games.

On April 29, 2017, Bleich signed a minor league contract with the Los Angeles Dodgers and was assigned to Oklahoma City of the Triple–A Pacific Coast League. Mid-season, his fastball was up to 95 mph, complemented by his curveball, changeup, and slider, and Oklahoma City pitching coach Matt Herges observed: "He's a strike machine, and he's fearless." He pitched in 31 games for Oklahoma City (for whom he was 5–3 with a 3.22 ERA, allowing opponents a .261 average — .228 by right-handers — as his fastball was in the mid-90s) and seven for the Class Double-A Tulsa Drillers while in the Dodgers system, and had a combined 5–4 record with 3 saves and a 3.77 ERA. On November 6, he elected to be a free agent.

=== Oakland Athletics ===
On January 15, 2018, Bleich signed a minor league contract with the Oakland Athletics organization and was invited to Major League spring training. A's general manager David Forst said, "Jeremy proved with his performance last year that he can pitch at this level." He began 2018 pitching for the Triple–A Nashville Sounds. For the 2018 season with Nashville, he was 1–2 with one save and a 2.63 ERA in 51 1/3 innings over 38 games.

==== Major leagues ====
On July 13, 2018, the Athletics selected Bleich to the 40-man roster and promoted him to the major leagues for the first time. He made his major league debut that night against the San Francisco Giants, a decade after being drafted and after pitching for 14 different teams, at 31 years of age. After he pitched in two major league games, he was designated for assignment on August 6. He elected free agency following the year on November 2. He faced 3,106 batters in the minor leagues, before facing just four in the majors.

=== Boston Red Sox ===
On December 18, 2018, Bleich signed a minor league deal with the Philadelphia Phillies organization. He pitched in spring training for the Phillies, and was released on March 21, 2019.

On April 17, 2019, Bleich signed a minor league deal with the Boston Red Sox organization. He pitched in the 2019 season with the Triple-A Pawtucket Red Sox, with whom he was 2–2 with a 5.59 ERA, and the Low–A Lowell Spinners, with whom in nine relief appearances he was 1–0 with an 0.71 ERA and 16 strikeouts in 12 2/3 innings.

=== Minnesota Twins ===
Bleich was traded to the Minnesota Twins on July 25, 2019, in exchange for cash considerations. Pitching for the Triple–A Rochester Red Wings in 2019, he was 1–1 with a 5.40 ERA and 17 strikeouts in 13 1/3 innings. Bleich elected free agency following the season on November 4.

== Post-playing career ==
=== Pittsburgh Pirates ===
Beginning in 2020, Bleich served as a hybrid advance scout and analytics whiz for the Pittsburgh Pirates. He worked on the positioning and shifting of the defense, in part by combining tendencies gleaned from advance scouting and from the available statistics.

=== Arizona Diamondbacks ===
On December 9, 2025, it was announced that Bleich had departed the Pirates organization to join tbr Arizona Diamondbacks as an assistant general manager.

== International team experience ==
=== Team USA ===
Bleich was a member of the U.S. Junior National Team in 2005, as it placed second at the 2005 Pan American Championships in Mexico.

=== Team Israel ===
Bleich pitched for Israel at the 2017 World Baseball Classic qualifier, in September 2016. Bleich first pitched during the second game of the series, throwing 23 pitches over 1 2/3 innings, giving up two hits while recording three strikeouts. Bleich again pitched during the third and final game of the series, throwing 13 pitches over 2/3 of an inning, giving up two hits, an unearned run, and a walk.

Bleich pitched for Team Israel at the 2017 World Baseball Classic main tournament, in March 2017. He appeared in three games, and struck out two batters in 2 1/3 innings. Bleich said: "It was an unbelievable experience.... Those guys will forever be like family. We battled together in a tough environment and we succeeded."

He pitched for Team Israel in the 2019 European Baseball Championship, going 0–0 with a 0.00 ERA, as he pitched in one game, tossing three innings in relief against Team Italy and giving up one hit and two walks while striking out six. He also pitched for the team at the Africa/Europe 2020 Olympic Qualification tournament in Italy in September 2019, which Israel won to qualify to play baseball at the 2020 Summer Olympics in Tokyo. In the tournament he was 1–1 with an 11.57 ERA over 4.2 innings.

He pitched for Team Israel at the 2020 Summer Olympics in Tokyo in the summer of 2021. He was 0–1 with a 3.86 ERA in three relief appearances, in which he limited opposing batters to a .125 batting average.

== See also ==
- List of Jewish Major League Baseball players
