= John Mayberry Jr. =

American baseball player (born 1983)

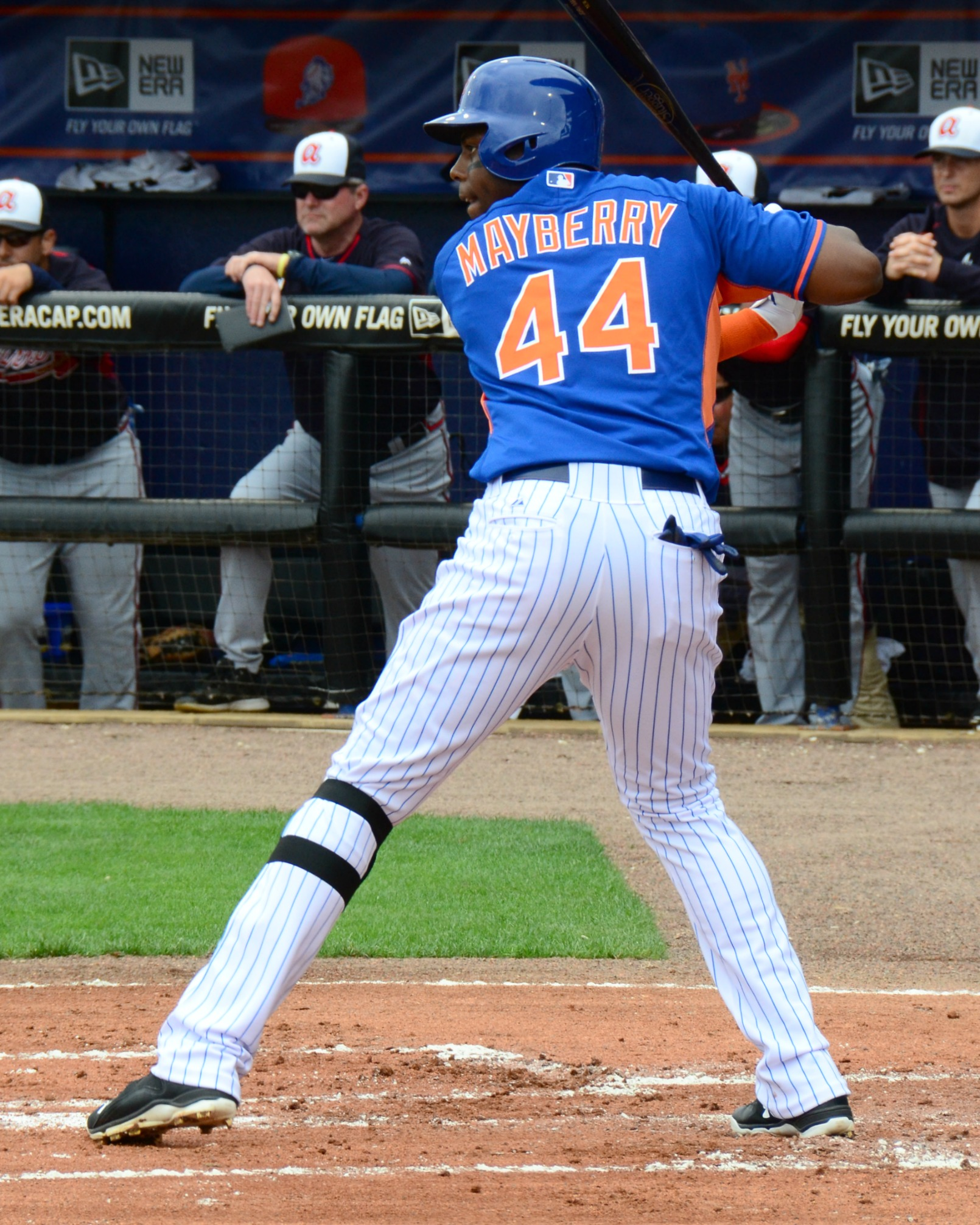
- Mayberry in 2015 with the Mets
- Outfielder
- Born: December 21, 1983 (age 42); Kansas City, Missouri, U.S.
- Batted: Right Threw: Right

MLB debut
- May 23, 2009, for the Philadelphia Phillies

Last MLB appearance
- July 24, 2015, for the New York Mets

MLB statistics
- Batting average: .235
- Home runs: 56
- Runs batted in: 180
- Stats at Baseball Reference

Teams
- Philadelphia Phillies (2009–2014); Toronto Blue Jays (2014); New York Mets (2015)
Medals
Men's baseball
Representing United States
World University Championship
Gold medal – first place	2004 Tainan	United States

John Claiborn Mayberry Jr. (born December 21, 1983), is an American former professional baseball outfielder, who played in the Major League Baseball (MLB) for the Philadelphia Phillies, Toronto Blue Jays, and New York Mets.

Mayberry played high school baseball in Kansas City, and USA Today named him a first-team 2002 All-USA player. In the 2002 Major League Baseball draft, the Seattle Mariners drafted him out of high school in the first round (28th overall). Mayberry chose not to sign, however, instead attending Stanford University, and also playing for the United States national baseball team at the World University Baseball Championship in 2004, winning a gold medal. After he played three years at Stanford, Mayberry was drafted again. The Texas Rangers selected him in the first round (19th overall) of the 2005 Major League Baseball draft.

In 2005, Mayberry was rated by Baseball America as the Best Athlete and Best Outfield Arm among all Texas Rangers minor leaguers. In 2006 he was rated by Baseball America as the Best Power Hitter, Best Athlete, and Best Outfield Arm among all Texas Rangers minor leaguers, and was named a Hawaii Winter Baseball league post-season All Star. In 2007, Mayberry hit 30 home runs (tied for 11th among all minor leaguers), was named a California League mid-season All Star, and was named an Arizona Fall League Rising Star. On November 20, 2008, the Philadelphia Phillies traded for him. With the Phillies, Mayberry started in Triple-A, and was called up to the major league team in May. He hit a home run in his major league debut, but was sent back to the minors a few weeks later, and spent the majority of the 2009 and 2010 seasons there. Mayberry was named an MiLB.com 2010 Phillies Organization All Star. He returned to the major league squad in 2010 as a September callup, and remained there, with the exception of a short stint in Triple-A in 2011. In 2011, Mayberry played over 100 games, splitting time between outfield and first base, as well as pinch hitting. Statistically, 2011 was his best major league season. He remained with the big-league club in 2012, and played predominantly in left field early in the season, and subsequently as the team's everyday center fielder. In 2012 and 2013 Mayberry‘s batting average declined.

Mayberry was used predominantly as a starting outfielder, despite some suggesting he was better suited as a platoon player. He hit for power, but struck out frequently. Mayberry was a good athlete, with good speed, but seldom stole any bases. Defensively, he was adequate, and possessed a strong and accurate arm. Mayberry has a degree in political science from Stanford. His father, John Mayberry Sr., a first round draft pick, himself (1967, 6th overall), played in MLB for over a decade, hitting over 20 home runs in eight separate seasons, and was a two-time American League (AL) All Star.

== Early life ==
Mayberry was born in Kansas City to John Sr. and Janice Mayberry. His father, a two-time All-Star first baseman, played Major League Baseball for 15 seasons (1968–82) with the Houston Astros, Kansas City Royals, Toronto Blue Jays, and New York Yankees.

He attended Rockhurst High School in Kansas City, graduating in 2002. While there, Mayberry was named First Team All-State and First Team All-Metro in 2001, after he hit .480 with eight homers. USA Today named him a first-team 2002 All-USA player, the National High School Baseball Coaches Association named him a 2002 third-team All-American, he was named the 2002 Missouri Gatorade High School Baseball Player of the Year, he was ranked No. 40 on Baseball America's 2002 Top 100 High School Prospect List, and he was named 2002 All-Region by the American Baseball Coaches Association as he hit .432 with nine homers. He also played basketball, averaging 14.0 points and 10.0 rebounds per game in his senior year as a forward.

Mayberry was drafted by the Seattle Mariners in the first round of the 2002 Major League Baseball draft (28th overall) but did not sign, choosing instead to attend Stanford University. He was the highest-drafted player from the 2002 draft who chose to attend a four-year college instead of signing a contract.

== College ==
Mayberry played three years for the Stanford Cardinal baseball team, and formed the heart of Stanford's batting order along with fellow future major league infielder Jed Lowrie. As a freshman in 2003, he had a 16-game hitting streak, batted .299, and hit four home runs and six triples (5th in the Pac-10 Conference) with 33 runs batted in (RBIs). He earned Freshman All-American honors from Collegiate Baseball (Louisville Slugger). Baseball America rated him as the best college athlete among its top 200 prospects, and the 3rd-best power hitter among them. During the summer of 2003, he also played for the Yarmouth-Dennis Red Sox of the Cape Cod Baseball League, batting .375.

As a sophomore in 2004, he batted .333 with 16 home runs (tied for 2nd in the Conference), 62 RBIs (tied for 3rd in the Conference), and 9 stolen bases with a .625 slugging percentage (3rd in the Conference). During his sophomore season, he was named a first-team All-Pac-10 selection and a midseason All-Star by Baseball America. In 2004, he played with Team USA at the FISU World University Baseball Championship in Taiwan, winning a gold medal.

Mayberry's junior year, which was his last at Stanford, he amassed 22 multi-hit games to lead the team. His batting average for the season was .303, and he had 63 RBIs (10th in the Conference) and 18 doubles (tied for 8th in the Conference). His .996 fielding percentage was fourth in the Conference, as he had only 2 errors in 501 chances. He also had five hitting streaks of six games or more throughout the season. Upon finishing his college career, Mayberry was ranked second among active Stanford players behind Lowrie in multi-hit games, multi-RBI games, and home runs. After his junior season, he was drafted by the Texas Rangers in the first round of the 2005 Major League Baseball draft (19th overall). He ultimately graduated from Stanford in 2006 with a political science degree.

== Professional career ==
=== Minor leagues ===
After being drafted, and signing for a signing bonus of $1.525 million, Mayberry was assigned by the Rangers to the Spokane Indians in the Northwest League, with whom he transitioned from first base to outfield. In the short 2005 season, he hit 11 home runs (tied for 3rd in the league) with a .253 batting average and 51 runs scored (4th in the league). Baseball America named him the 8th-best prospect in the Northwest League, and as having the 4th-best power among 2005 draftees. He was rated by Baseball America as the Best Athlete and Best Outfield Arm among all Texas Rangers minor leaguers.

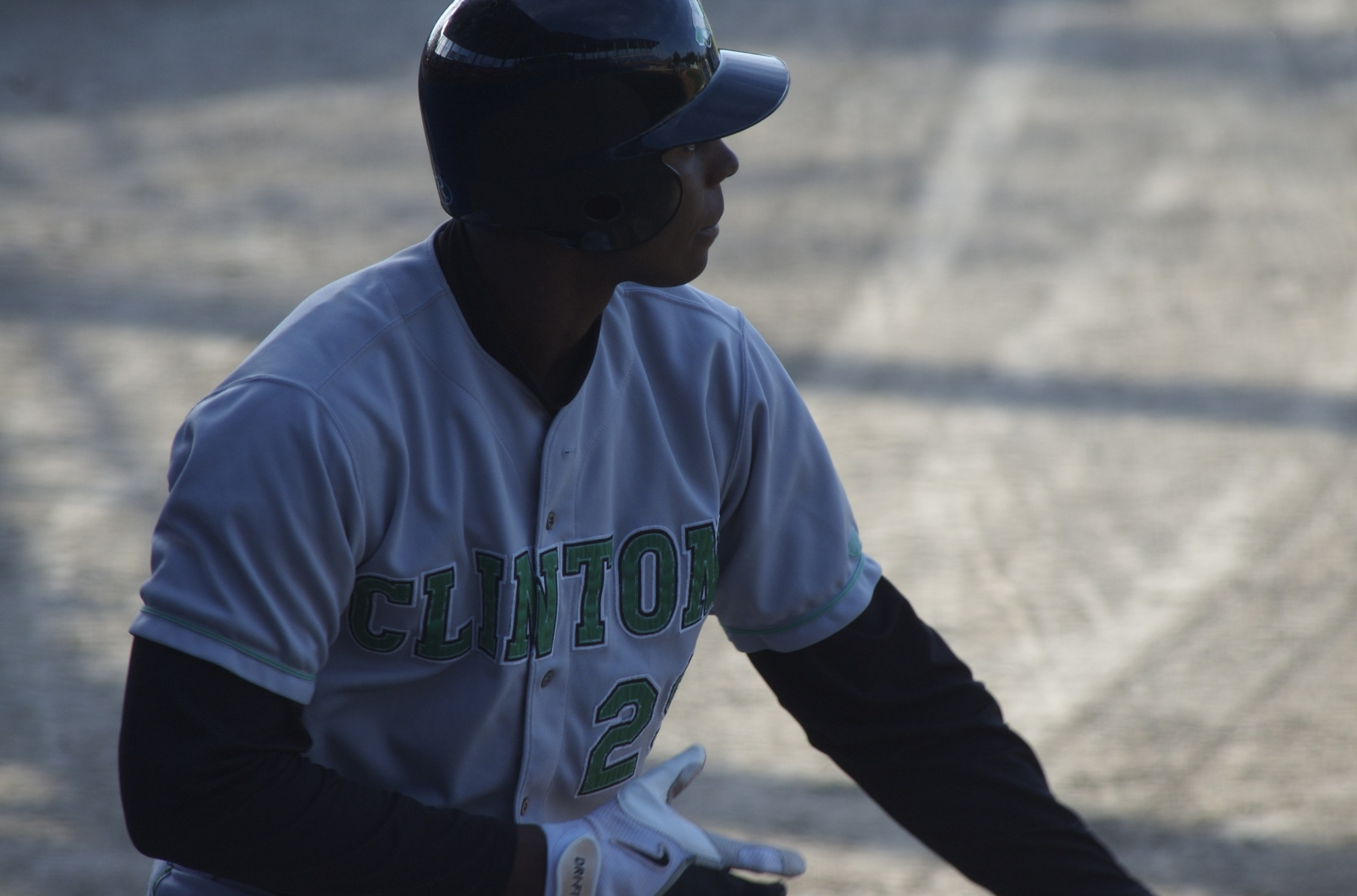
John Mayberry Jr. with the Clinton LumberKings

In 2006, Mayberry was promoted to the A-level Clinton LumberKings of the Midwest League. On August 27 he was named Midwest League Player of the Week, and that month he was named Rangers Minor League Player of the Month. He batted .268 and hit 21 home runs (3rd in the league) with 77 RBIs (7th in the league), while scoring 77 runs (7th in the league), as his .479 slugging percentage was 7th in the league and he hit four triples and stole nine bases. He was rated by Baseball America as the Best Power Hitter, Best Athlete, and Best Outfield Arm among all Texas Rangers minor leaguers. He played for the West Oahu CaneFires of the Hawaii Winter Baseball league (HWB), on November 5 was named HWB Player of the Week, for the season batted .318 and led the league in slugging percentage (.545) and was second in doubles (9) and RBIs (23), and was named an HWB post-season All Star.

He split 2007 between the high-A Bakersfield Blaze of the California League and double-A Frisco RoughRiders of the Texas League, where he hit 30 home runs (tied for 11th among all minor leaguers) between the two minor league levels, drove in 83 runs, and stole a career-high 16 bases between the two teams. He was named a California League mid-season All Star. For the season, Baseball America named him the fifth-best prospect in the Rangers' farm system, up from tenth in 2006. He played for the Surprise Saguaros of the Arizona Fall League (AFL), was second in the league with five home runs, and was named an AFL Rising Star.

With 20 home runs and 137 hits between Frisco and the Oklahoma RedHawks of the AAA Pacific Coast League in 2008, Mayberry continued to show major league potential. In his first 32 at bats at Triple-A, he had 16 hits, including a 5-hit performance in the fourth game after his call-up. In what Philadelphia Phillies general manager Rubén Amaro, Jr. called a "speed for power swap", Mayberry was traded to the Phillies on November 20, 2008, for outfielder Greg Golson.

Beginning the 2009 season with the Lehigh Valley IronPigs of the AAA International League, Mayberry opened the season hitting 8 home runs and 25 RBIs, with a .277 batting average. In need of an extra bat off the bench for interleague play, the Phillies promoted Mayberry to the major leagues on May 22. In 2009-10 with the Yaquis de Obregón of the Mexican Pacific Winter League he batted .313/.389/.493.

In 2010, back with the IronPigs he batted .267 with 15 home runs and 75 runs (5th in the International League), while stealing a career-high 20 bases. On April 19, he was named International League Player of the Week. He was named an MiLB.com Phillies Organization All Star.

=== Philadelphia Phillies ===
==== 2009 ====
The Phillies called Mayberry up to the major league squad for the first time on May 22, 2009. The next day, in his first major league game, Mayberry got his first career hit, a three-run home run off of Andy Pettitte of the New York Yankees. After his second brief stint of the year in the minor leagues, he returned to the Phillies when left fielder Raúl Ibañez went on the 15-day disabled list with a strained groin. Mayberry promptly proceeded to hit another home run in his return to the majors, this time off of Dirk Hayhurst of the Toronto Blue Jays. Several years later, a piece in The Philadelphia Daily News commented, "He has always had the physical tools that cause an organization to dream, as the Rangers did when they selected him in the first round in 2005. But by 2009, that dream had been replaced by what they thought was reality: his swing was too long, his eye indiscriminate, his on base percentage low."

==== 2010 ====
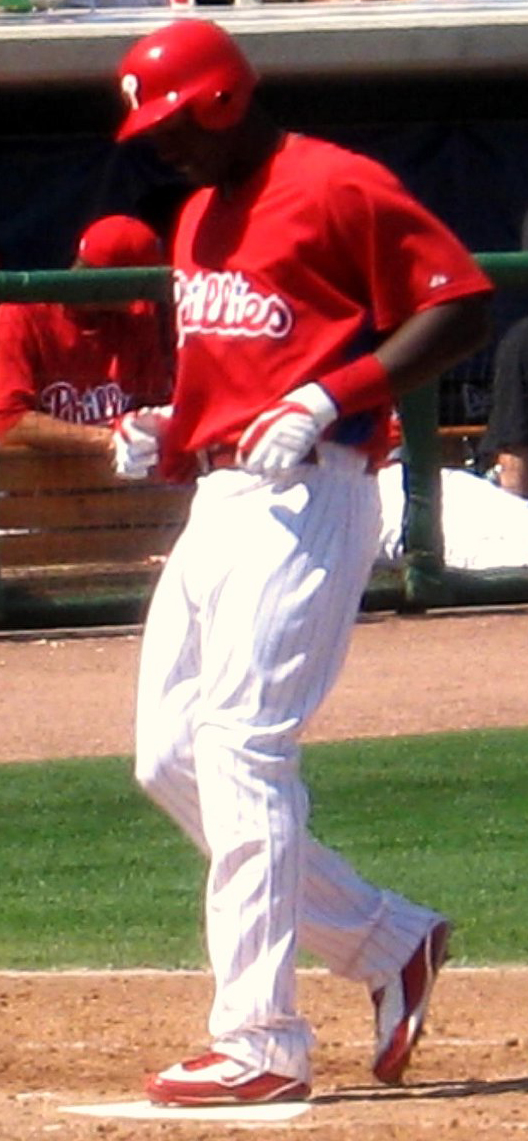
Mayberry with the Phillies in 2010

Mayberry played only 11 games with the Phillies in 2010, batting .333 with two home runs, and spending the majority of the season (128 games) at Triple-A Lehigh Valley, with whom he hit .267 with 15 home runs and 65 RBIs. 2010 marked the first year during which Mayberry spent multiple stints in the major and minor leagues, which he described as "different". He did earn a September callup, and "made a case" to have a place on the Phillies' postseason roster, but was assigned to the Mesa Solar Sox of the Arizona Fall League (AFL) instead. He left the AFL after just one game, with a leg injury.

==== 2011 ====
Mayberry made the Phillies' opening day roster for the first time, and recorded the game-winning RBI via a pinch hit single in the Phillies' first game, but was optioned back to the minors after the Phillies activated Shane Victorino from the disabled list in early June. Subsequently, Mayberry returned to the big-league club when Victorino went back to the disabled list. Throughout 2011, Mayberry did not have a defined role on the club. In August, columnist David Murphy wrote, "While the Phillies may not see evidence that Mayberry should be part of their everyday plans, it is getting hard to ignore the two huge offensive tools he brings to the table: immense power, and a curious ability to hit when it counts." He added, "Charlie Manuel has always seemed to have a soft spot in his heart for Mayberry. And, more importantly, he has always seemed to have a knack for when to put him into a game." Manuel compared Mayberry to former Phillie Jayson Werth in terms of their size, athleticism, and the fact that they both hit better against left-handed pitching than right-handed pitching, noting that he planned to give Mayberry a chance to start if Ben Francisco floundered. Ultimately, the Phillies traded away Francisco after the season, in part due to Mayberry's emergence. He finished the season batting .273/.341/.513, with a .854 OPS and 15 home runs in 104 games, and made his postseason debut in the National League Division Series against the St. Louis Cardinals that September.

==== 2012 ====
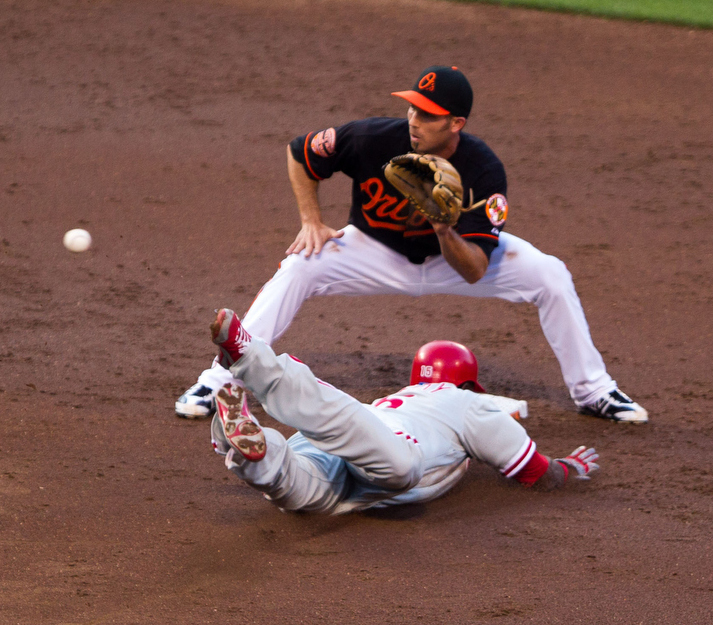
John Mayberry Jr. slides into second base in a game on June 8, 2012

After a productive 2011 season during which he "excited fans" and seemed like "a sure bet to crack at least 25 (home runs) the following year and maybe drive in 100 runs", Mayberry's performance instead declined significantly, hitting just .245 (a 28-point drop), albeit with similar power numbers (14 home runs and 46 runs batted in compared to 15 and 49 respectively in 2011). After a poor start to the season, some sportswriters questioned whether the Phillies should have prioritized finding a left fielder in free agency to supplant him, who entered the season platooning in left field with Juan Pierre. Mayberry's slump continued into May – on May 1, he held a .204 batting average – and ultimately, Pierre excelled to the point that he became the de facto everyday starter, leaving Mayberry on the bench until late July, when the Phillies traded both Shane Victorino and Hunter Pence, forcing Mayberry to see action, predominantly in center field. Though he played well in August (batting .290), he struggled through September, and expectations were relatively low headed into the offseason. A season-in-review article from SBNation.com opined, "(His) adequate defense at all three outfield positions makes him a decent fourth outfielder/bench bat, but at age 29 in 2013, the time for hoping that Mayberry finally puts his significant physical and intellectual gifts together to become an above-average Major League Baseball player appear to have gone completely."

==== 2013 ====
Mayberry entered the season looking to bounce back from a rather tumultuous 2012 campaign, and was considered a solid bench player who can make occasional starts in the outfield. Baseball statistician Bill James projected Mayberry would hold a .257 batting average and hit 11 home runs in 306 plate appearances. Despite being projected as a bench player, Mayberry was the Phillies' opening day right fielder, and batted seventh in the opening day starting lineup, as Delmon Young, acquired to be the starting right fielder, was injured. On June 4, 2013, Mayberry hit a walk-off grand slam in the 11th inning against the Miami Marlins 7–3. The preceding inning, he hit a solo home run to tie the game. By doing so, he became the first player in Major League history to hit two extra-inning home runs, the second of which being a grand slam. It was the first walk-off grand slam hit by the Phillies at Citizens Bank Park. Ultimately, Mayberry played in 134 games, recording just a .227 batting average, 11 home runs, and 39 runs batted in. After the season, the Phillies tendered a contract to him despite external pressure not to do so. Ruben Amaro Jr. commented that he sees Mayberry as a valuable player off the bench for a relatively cheap price. Bill Baer, a writer for Crashburn Alley, a Phillies blog sponsored by ESPN, countered, "Everything Amaro said there is accurate. Mayberry is not starter-caliber; he is an ideal platoon partner in the outfield or at first base. The only problem is that the Phillies had some ideal situations to use Mayberry in specifically that way and Amaro either did not realize it or ignored it."

==== 2014 ====
Before the 2014 season, the Phillies signed Mayberry to a guaranteed $1.5875 million contract. Mayberry entered the season a member of the Phillies bench who some writers thought was not worth his salary, but made the opening day roster. Mayberry was successful early in the season, particularly as a pinch hitter – as of June 13, he was 9-for-19 with three home runs and 11 RBIs. He also started several games at first base, predominantly against left-handed pitchers. This success led some to suggest the Mayberry would have value in a potential trade, as the Phillies were not expected to make the playoffs, and thus might prefer to get a prospect for future seasons. However, some attributed Mayberry's success to the fact that the Phillies used him in an appropriate role, rather than trying to utilize him every day.

=== Toronto Blue Jays ===
On August 31, 2014, Mayberry was traded to the Toronto Blue Jays for minor league infielder Gustavo Pierre. He made his debut for Toronto on September 4, when he was put into the game against the Tampa Bay Rays to pinch-hit for Adam Lind. Before he could bat, Tampa Bay made a pitching change, and Mayberry was himself pinch-hit for by Colby Rasmus. He would go on to play in 15 games for the Blue Jays in 2014, and batted .208 with 1 home run and 2 RBIs. On December 2, Mayberry was non-tendered by the Blue Jays, making him a free agent.

=== New York Mets ===
On December 11, 2014, Mayberry signed a one-year, $1.45 million contract, including $500,000 in incentives, with the New York Mets. In spring training, he batted .415 with a 1.155 OPS. After hitting .164 over 119 plate appearances, while compiling 18 hits, 9 walks, 9 RBIs, 3 home runs, and 8 runs scored, Mayberry was designated for assignment on July 24, 2015, and released on July 30.

=== Chicago White Sox ===
On August 7, 2015, Mayberry signed a minor league deal with the Chicago White Sox. On August 26, Mayberry was released by the White Sox organization.

=== Detroit Tigers ===
On January 13, 2016, the Detroit Tigers signed Mayberry to a minor-league $1 million contract and invited him to spring training. He was released by the Tigers on April 1.

== Player profile ==
=== Offense ===
The Phillies initially acquired Mayberry for his power hitting potential, and throughout his ascent through the minor leagues, he hit double-digit home runs, but his plate discipline was poor, as he struck out on over 20% of plate appearances. According to ESPN hot zones, Mayberry hits pitches in the middle of the plate belt-high, as well as pitches down and inside the best, while he struggles predominantly on outside pitches. Mayberry has long been considered a good athlete, and finally honed his speed to translate it to success on the basepaths – he stole many bases in the minor leagues, but only 14 in the major leagues. The Hardball Times once published a piece that compared his hitting ability to that of Mike Morse in terms of their similar power hitting ability. From 2011–2013, Mayberry performed significantly better against left-handed pitchers than right-handed pitchers. Against lefties, he totaled 21 home runs and 53 RBIs in 377 at bats with a batting average of .273, whereas against righties, he totaled 19 home runs and 81 RBIs in 684 at bats with a batting average of .231. Kenny Ayres, a writer for Phillies Nation, commented that "between the long looping swing, chasing sliders three feet outside and his frustrating tendency to try to pull everything, Mayberry has earned just about as low a score for the season as a position player can have" in regards to his 2013 season.

=== Defense ===
The recurring term used throughout the media to describe Mayberry's defense is "adequate". Over the years, he has seen significant time at all three outfield positions. Former Phillies manager Charlie Manuel preferred him as a corner outfielder, however when the Phillies traded away Shane Victorino, Mayberry was the predominant center fielder for the remainder of the season in 2012. In 2013, Mayberry played 79 games in right field, 46 in center field, 9 in left field, and 7 at first base. He has a strong throwing arm from the outfield that is fairly accurate.

== Personal life ==
A year after he was drafted, Mayberry completed his degree in political science from Stanford in 2006. Mayberry's father, John Mayberry, Sr., played 15 seasons of Major League Baseball, predominantly as a member of the Kansas City Royals and Toronto Blue Jays.

== See also ==
- List of second-generation Major League Baseball players
