= Les Murakami Stadium =

Baseball stadium in Honolulu, Hawaii

- The House that Les Built
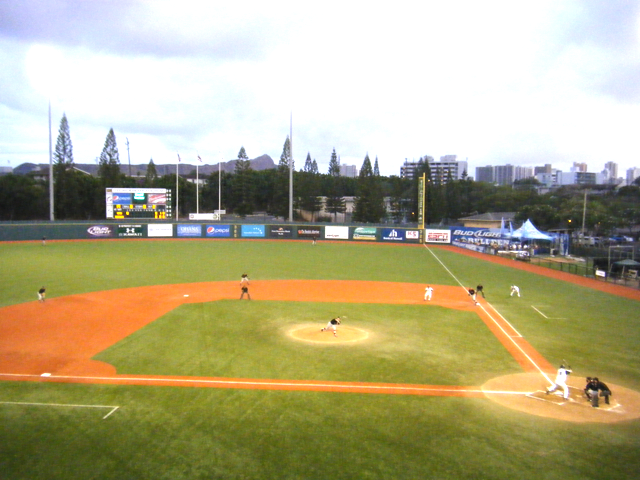
- Les Murakami Stadium with Diamond Head and Waikiki in the background

- Location within Hawaii Location within the United States
- Interactive map of Les Murakami Stadium
- Former names: Rainbow Stadium (1984–2002)
- Location: Honolulu CDP, City and County of Honolulu, Hawaii, United States
- Coordinates: 21°17′35″N 157°48′57″W
- Owner: University of Hawaii
- Operator: University of Hawaii at Manoa
- Capacity: 4,312
- Surface: DomoTurf (2008–present); AstroTurf (1985–2007); Grass (1984)
- Field size: Left field – 325 ft Center field – 385 ft Right field – 325 ft

Construction
- Groundbreaking: 1983
- Opened: February 17, 1984
- Cost: $12.2 million

Tenants
- Hawaii Rainbows baseball (NCAA) 1984–present Hawaii Islanders (PCL) 1986–1987; Hawaii Island Movers (ABL) 1986–1998, 2000–2001; Honolulu Sharks (HWB) 1993–1997, 2006–2008; Waikiki BeachBoys (HWB) 2006–2008

Les Murakami Stadium is the baseball stadium at the University of Hawaii at Manoa in Honolulu CDP, City and County of Honolulu, Hawaii, United States. The stadium was built in 1984 and renamed after legendary Rainbow coach and College Baseball Hall of Famer Les Murakami for the 2002 season.

== History ==
In 1983, the University of Hawaii appropriated the money to build a state-of-the-art on-campus baseball facility. The project took less than nine months to complete. On February 17, 1984, Rainbow Stadium opened its gates for a game between Hawaii and USC. The facility originally cost $11.2 million in 1984. In 1985, the roof, which was only the middle section, was extended down the first- and third-base lines and AstroTurf was laid over the entire playing surface, boosting the final cost to $12.2 million.

Some of the architectural features include two concession stands, two sunken dugouts with separate locker room facilities, the new Grand Slam Booster Club room, a locker room for the umpires, the Verizon Academic Center complete with computers, a laundry room, and a training room. The two-tier press box is air-conditioned and carpeted, and has a radio and a television booth on opposite ends. The stadium seats 4,312, with 3,738 of the seats covered to shelter the fans from the frequent spring rains of Manoa, called the "Manoa Mist" by fans.

Along with renaming the stadium in 2002, the baseball program moved the outfield fences in 15 feet and lowered them from 12 to 10 feet, turning what had been a pitchers' ballpark into a more hitter-friendly stadium. Also, a new fiber-optic scoreboard/message board capable of showing TV replays was added in 2002.

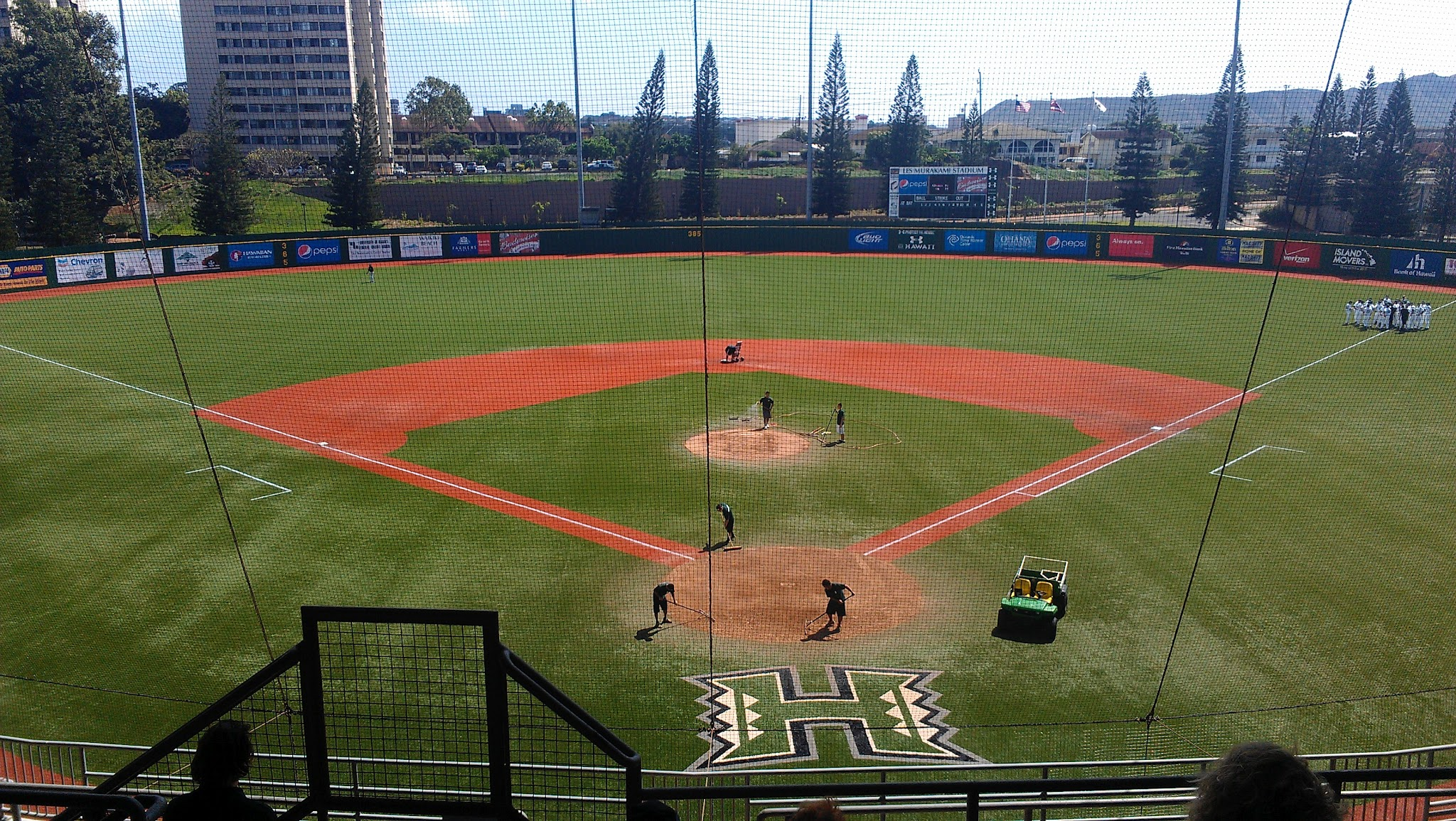
The playing diamond in 2012

Murakami, the first full-time head baseball coach in the program's history, developed the program for 31 years and led the Rainbows to the 1980 College World Series, their only CWS appearance. Hawaii lost 5–3 in the championship game to Arizona.

Rainbow baseball was its most prosperous between 1989–94 for two big reasons. First, in 279 home dates, UH posted a 69.9 winning percentage and went 195–84 at home. Secondly, attendance flourished, drawing 983,261 fans for an average of 3,524. Les Murakami Stadium was sold out for 179 of those 279 dates.

The facility has attracted more than 2.5 million fans since opening in 1984. In the most attended season of 1992, UH fans set two milestones. First, on March 7, 1992, the one-millionth fan walked through the turnstiles. Secondly, Hawaii set a school and NCAA attendance record of 208,378, which has since been broken. In 2013, the Rainbow Warriors ranked 13th among Division I baseball programs in attendance, averaging 3,357 per home game.

In 2004, the big crowds returned to Les Murakami Stadium as the Rainbows averaged almost 2,500 in attendance per game, including their first sellout in five years on a Saturday night game vs. then-No. 3 Rice on May 8, 2004. The 'Bows did not disappoint the packed house, taking a thrilling 6–5 victory.

After 11 years of use, the existing AstroTurf was changed to DomoTurf in time for the 2008 baseball season. DomoTurf is an artificial field system utilizing synthetic grass and rubber infill granules, which is said to better simulate real soil feel and reduce injuries.

The DomoTurf was replaced in 2025 with Shaw Sports Turf and sported a new design similar to the field at the nearby Clarence T.C. Ching Athletics Complex. The pitcher's mound and dugout also turfed as well to help avoid rain delays.

== See also ==
- List of NCAA Division I baseball venues
