= Waikiki BeachBoys =

Information
- League: Hawaii Winter Baseball (2006–08)
- Location: Honolulu, Hawaii
- Ballpark: Les Murakami Baseball Stadium
- Founded: 2006
- Folded: 2008
- League championships: 1 (2008)
- Division championships: 3 (2006, 2007, 2008)
- Colors: Red, Navy Blue, Gold, White
- Manager: Chris Freas

The Waikiki BeachBoys were a minor league baseball team in the Hawaii Winter Baseball league. They were based in Honolulu, Hawaii. The BeachBoys name derives from the "Beach Boys of Waikiki," a group credited with the rebirth of surfing in Hawaii.

The BeachBoys played their home games at the Les Murakami Baseball Stadium.

== Notable players ==
- Yonder Alonso
- Jeremy Bleich
- Lucas Duda
- Todd Frazier
- Buster Posey

== Team record ==
Season	W	L	Win %	Result
2006	20	16	.556	division champs
2007	19	19	.500	division champs
2008	19	17	.528	league champs
