= Hans L'Orange Field =

Baseball stadium in Waipahu, Hawaii, US

- Location within Hawaii Hans L'Orange Field (the United States)
- Interactive map of Hans L'Orange Field
- Former names: Oahu Sugar Co. Field (1924–1971)
- Address: 94-1024 Waipahu St. Waipahu, Hawaii; US
- Coordinates: 21.389387°N 158.005779°W
- Owner: The City and County of Honolulu
- Operator: The City and County of Honolulu
- Capacity: 2,100

Construction
- Opened: 1924
- Renovated: 1995, 2016
- Builder: Oahu Sugar Co.

Tenants
- North Shore Honu (HWB) 1993–1997, 2006–2008; West Oahu CaneFires (HWB) 2006–2008; Hawaii Pacific Sharks (PacWest) 2016–present

Hans L'Orange Field is a stadium in Waipahu, Hawai'i, United States. It is primarily used for baseball, and is the home field of Hawaii Pacific University's men's baseball team, the Sharks, since 2016. It has a capacity of 2,100.

== History ==
Hans L'Orange Field began as a recreation area for Oahu Sugar Co. workers. Originally known as Oahu Sugar Co. Field, it was later named after the manager who, in 1924, convinced the company to give up several acres of cane field, to create the recreation area. The renaming officially occurred in 1955. Originally the company maintained ownership of the field but in 1968, ownership was transferred to the city of Waipahu. A smokestack from the original Oahu Sugar factory is located just outside the center field fence, with vog regularly being in the environs of the stadium, which has been viewed by baseball fans to give it an eerie atmosphere at night games.

The park was refurbished for Hawaii Winter Baseball in 1995. It was the home field of the Hawaii Winter Baseball teams North Shore Honu and West Oahu CaneFires before the league folded in 2008. In February 2016, The City and County of Honolulu completed several improvement projects that included upgrading the irrigation system, grading the field and expanding the foul territory in right field. In January 2023, it temporarily closed again for further refurbishments, which included expanding the parking capacity and installing a new irrigation system. The works suffered from repeated delays until the field eventually reopened in September 2024.
