= Kenley Jansen =

Curaçaoan baseball player (born 1987)

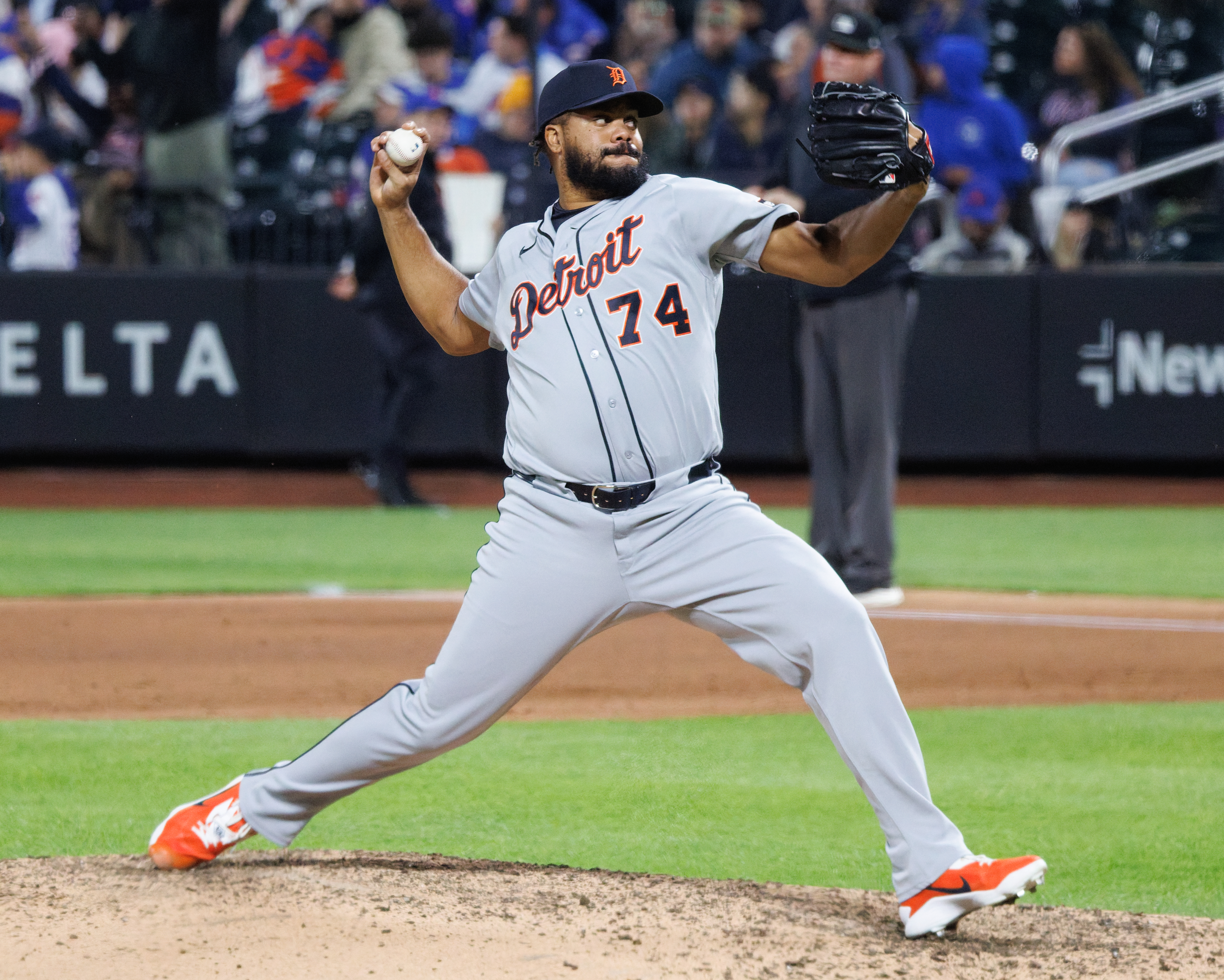
- Jansen with the Detroit Tigers in 2026

Free agent
- Pitcher
- Born: September 30, 1987 (age 39); Willemstad, Curaçao
- Bats: Switch Throws: Right

MLB debut
- July 24, 2010, for the Los Angeles Dodgers

MLB statistics (through 2026 season)
- Win–loss record: 58–46
- Earned run average: 2.60
- Strikeouts: 1,329
- Saves: 498
- Stats at Baseball Reference

Teams
- Los Angeles Dodgers (2010–2021); Atlanta Braves (2022); Boston Red Sox (2023–2024); Los Angeles Angels (2025); Detroit Tigers (2026)

Career highlights and awards
- 4× All-Star (2016–2018, 2023); World Series champion (2020); 2× NL Reliever of the Year (2016, 2017); 2× NL saves leader (2017, 2022)

Kenley Geronimo Jansen (born September 30, 1987) is a Curaçaoan professional baseball pitcher who is a free agent. He has previously played in Major League Baseball (MLB) for the Los Angeles Dodgers, Atlanta Braves, Boston Red Sox, Los Angeles Angels and the Detroit Tigers. He has represented the Netherlands national baseball team in international competition.

Signed by the Dodgers as an undrafted free agent in 2004, Jansen converted from a catcher to a relief pitcher in the minor leagues and made his major league debut in 2010. He served as the Dodgers' closer starting in 2012, and led the National League (NL) in saves in 2017 and 2022. After 11 years with the Dodgers, he entered free agency and signed a one-year deal with the Braves in 2022. He then signed with the Red Sox.

Jansen is a four-time MLB All-Star and two-time NL Reliever of the Year (2016, 2017). In 2019, Jansen became the 30th pitcher to reach 300 career saves. In 2023, he became the seventh pitcher to total 400 career saves. He also is a member of 450-save club, having reached that on April 8, 2025. He currently ranks third all-time with 498 career saves.

== Early life ==
Jansen was born in Willemstad, Curaçao, the youngest of three sons of Isidor and Bernadette Jansen. His father worked in construction until suffering a stroke when Kenley was 12. His mother was a travel agent. Jansen grew up as a Braves fan because the team's games were broadcast in Curaçao on TBS. The team signed fellow Curaçaoan Andruw Jones and Jansen's older brother Ardley. Kenley Jansen began playing baseball at the age of six, alongside his older brothers. He began as an outfielder before moving to shortstop. Jansen then met Andrelton Simmons and was shifted to third base. He later played first base and catcher.

== Baseball career ==
=== Minor leagues ===
Jansen was signed as an undrafted free agent catcher by the Dodgers organization on November 17, 2004 and was assigned to the Rookie Class Gulf Coast Dodgers. He played in 37 games and hit .304 before being promoted to the Ogden Raptors of the Pioneer League on August 26. He had two hits in 11 at-bats in three games for Ogden. He was back with the Gulf Coast Dodgers the following season, hitting .245 in 35 games. After the season he played for the North Shore Honu in the Hawaii Winter Baseball League, where he hit .121 in nine games.

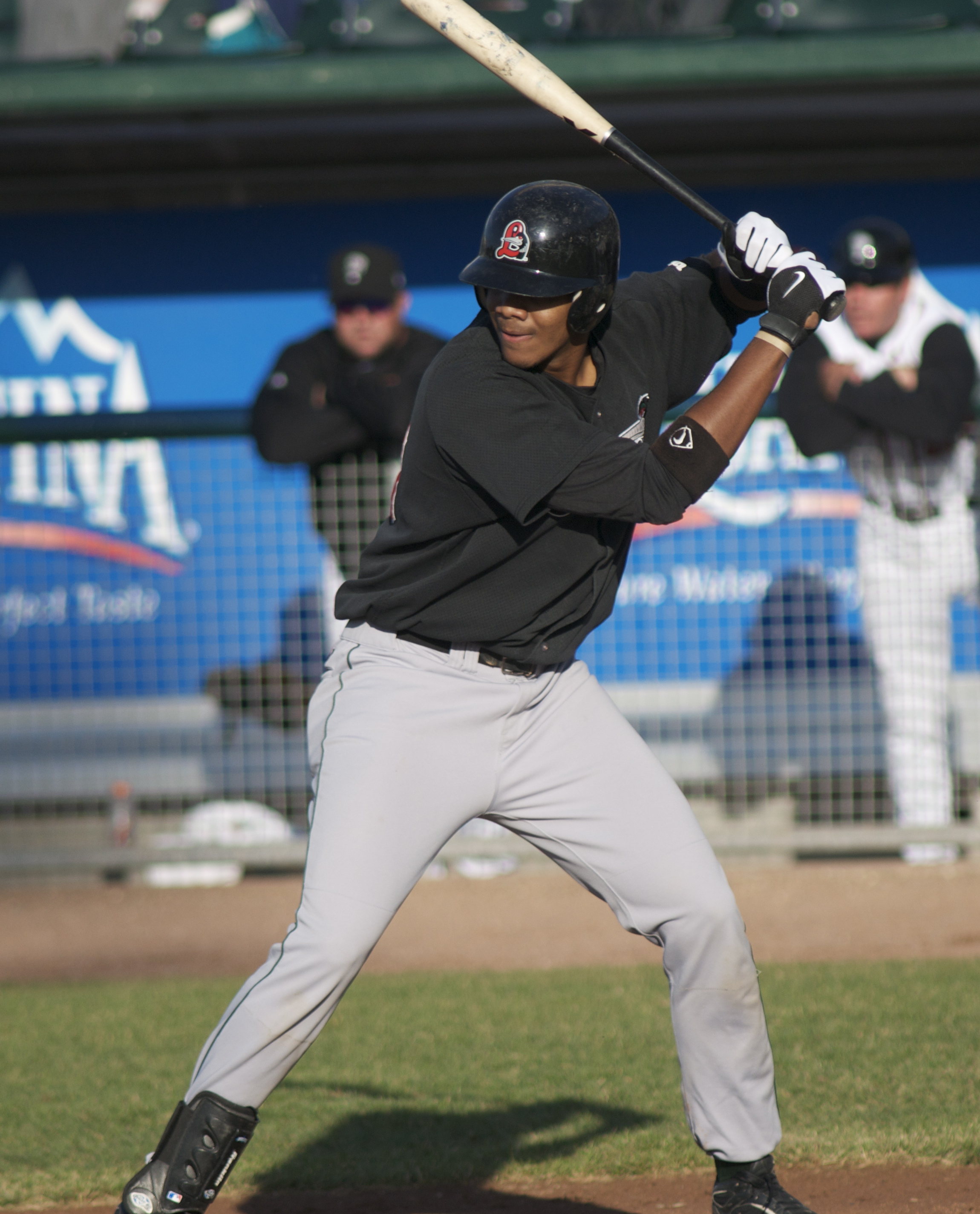
Jansen batting for the Great Lakes Loons in 2008

Jansen split 2007 between the Raptors and the Class-A Great Lakes Loons of the Midwest League, hitting .207 in 73 games. After the season, he again played in Hawaii Winter Baseball, this time for the West Oahu CaneFires In 2008 with the Loons, he hit .227 and nine home runs in 79 games. He was selected to the mid-season Midwest League All-Star game.

In 2009, he was the starting catcher for the Netherlands team in the World Baseball Classic. In the Netherlands' upset of the favored Dominican Republic team, Jansen threw out Willy Taveras on an attempted steal of third base in the ninth inning, a key play in the game. He began 2009 with the Inland Empire 66ers of San Bernardino, but hit just .202 in 38 games. Despite that, he appeared in eight games for the Triple-A Albuquerque Isotopes but had just five hits in 27 at-bats.

The Dodgers convinced Jansen that he had no future at catcher because of his poor offensive numbers and that he should switch to pitching. Under the tutelage of former major leaguer Charlie Hough, he made the conversion in the second half of the 2009 season at Inland Empire. He pitched 11 2/3 innings for the 66ers, allowing six earned runs. He continued the conversion in the Arizona Fall League for the Peoria Javelinas.

Jansen was added to the Dodgers 40-man roster on November 19, 2009. He started with Inland Empire again and allowed only five runs in 18 innings while striking out 28 batters. On May 15, 2010, he was promoted to the Double-A Chattanooga Lookouts, where he was selected to the mid-season Southern League All-Star Game. He pitched 27 innings in 22 games for the Lookouts with a 1.67 ERA.

=== Los Angeles Dodgers (2010–2021) ===
==== 2010 ====
On July 23, 2010, Jansen was promoted to the Dodgers. He made his Major League debut in relief on July 24 against the New York Mets, where he pitched a scoreless inning, retiring all three batters he faced and striking out two. On July 25, Jansen recorded his first Major League save, when he pitched a 1-2-3 inning against the Mets.

On August 26, Jansen walked and scored a run in his first Major League plate appearance, in Milwaukee against Yovani Gallardo of the Brewers. He collected his first major league hit on August 31, a single up the middle off Kyle Kendrick of the Philadelphia Phillies. Jansen recorded his first win against the Houston Astros on September 11. He appeared in 25 games with the Dodgers in 2010, working 27 innings with a 1–0 record and a 0.67 ERA. He also saved four games in 2010.

==== 2011 ====
In 2011, Jansen became a key member of the Dodgers' bullpen. He was 2–1 with a 2.85 ERA in 53 2/3 innings and saved five games. Jansen also struck out 96 batters, setting a new Major League season record with 16 1/3 strikeouts per nine innings.

==== 2012 ====
In May 2012, Jansen became the Dodgers' closer after Javy Guerra struggled in the role. At the end of the season, after missing some time due to heart problems, Jansen was replaced as closer by Brandon League. He appeared in 65 games, compiling a 5–3 record, 2.35 ERA, 99 strikeouts, and 25 saves.

==== 2013 ====
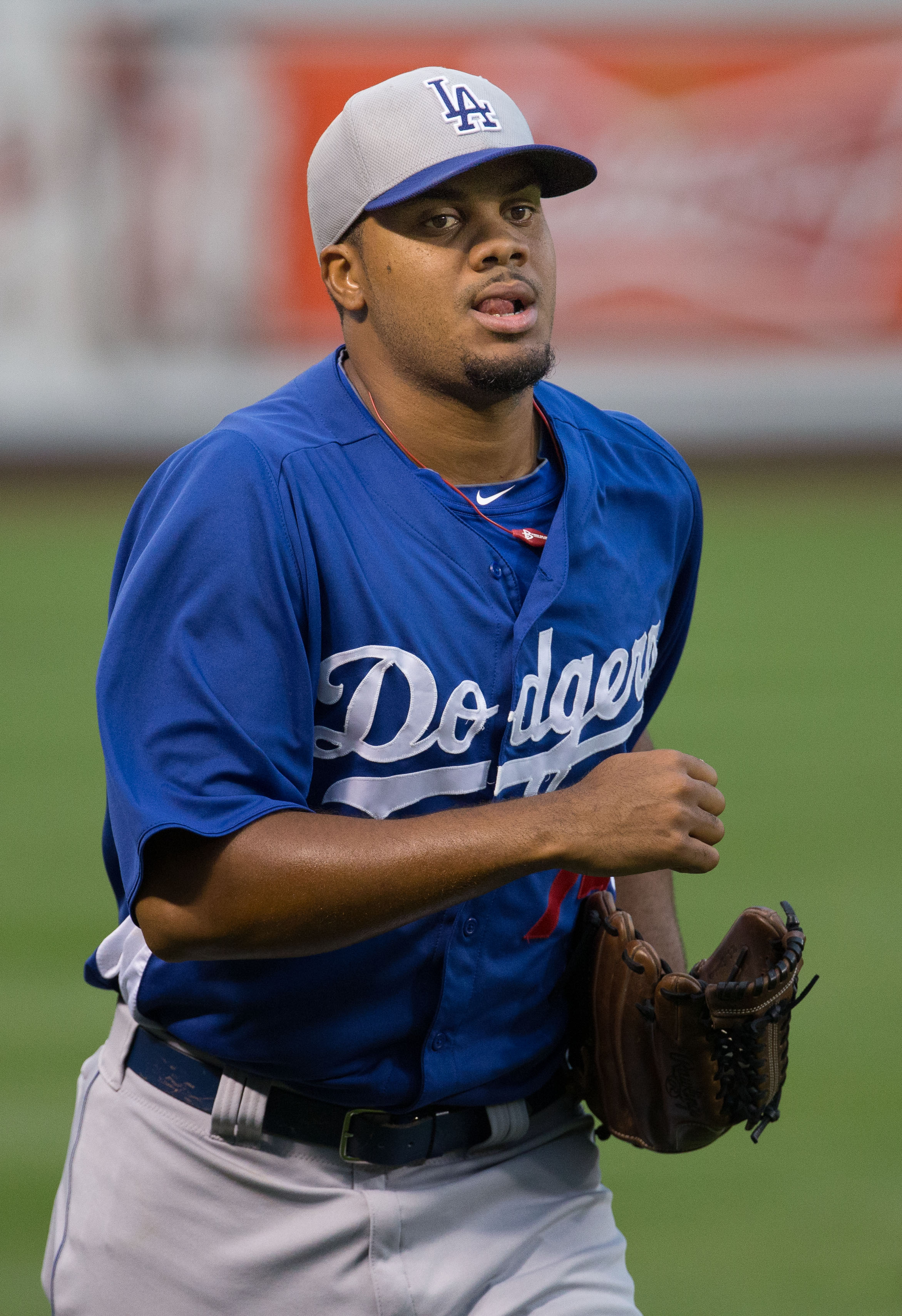
Jansen with the 2013 Los Angeles Dodgers

Jansen began 2013 as the setup man in the bullpen but resumed the role as closer when League struggled. He pitched in 75 games with a 4–3 record, 1.88 ERA and 28 saves. He did not allow any runs in three appearances in the 2013 National League Division Series (NLDS) against the Atlanta Braves but was less effective in the Championship Series (NLCS) against the Cardinals, allowing two runs in two innings.

==== 2014 ====
On February 11, 2014, Jansen avoided his first arbitration hearing by signing a $4.3 million contract with the Dodgers. Fully established as the Dodgers' closer in 2014, Jansen worked in 68 games with a 2.76 ERA, 101 strikeouts and 44 saves. He became just the fourth Dodger pitcher in history with at least 40 saves in a season, joining Éric Gagné (who did it three times), Todd Worrell, and Jeff Shaw. Jansen only pitched one inning in the NLDS against the Cardinals.

==== 2015 ====
On January 16, 2015, Jansen again avoided arbitration, signing a one-year $7.425 million contract with the Dodgers. However, on February 17, he underwent surgery to remove a growth from a bone in his left foot. The recovery time kept him out of action until May. Jansen was eventually activated off the disabled list on May 15 and rejoined the Dodgers. Jansen struck out 23 batters in his first 14 games of the season, without giving up a walk. This broke Jay Howell's team records, set in 1991, of 13 games without a walk to start a season and 20 strikeouts without a walk to start a season. Jansen eventually struck out 27 before he finally walked a batter on June 30, eight shy of the major league record. He made 54 appearances for the team in 2015 with a 2.41 ERA and 36 saves. He struck out 80 batters while only walking 8 all season. He became the first Dodgers pitcher with five seasons of 80 or more strikeouts in relief. He appeared in three games, with two saves in the 2015 NLDS and did not allow a run in 3 2/3 innings.

==== 2016 ====
In his final year of arbitration, Jansen signed a one-year, $10.65 million, contract with the Dodgers on January 15, 2016. On June 20, Jansen picked up his 162nd career save against the Washington Nationals, breaking the Dodgers franchise record, previously held by Gagné. He was also selected to the National League team for the 2016 All-Star Game, his first all-star selection. On August 24, Jansen tied Jim Brewer's franchise record with 604 strikeouts by a reliever. In 71 games, he was 3–2 with a 1.83 ERA and 47 saves and earned the National League Reliever of the Year Award. Of all MLB pitchers, he held right-handed batters to the lowest batting average, .107 (in 30 or more innings). In the 2016 NLDS against the Washington Nationals, Jansen pitched in four games and worked 5 1/3 innings, allowing four runs and saving two games. In the 2016 NLCS against the Chicago Cubs he pitched 6 1/3 innings over three games, with one save, and struck out 10 while only allowing one hit.

==== 2017 ====
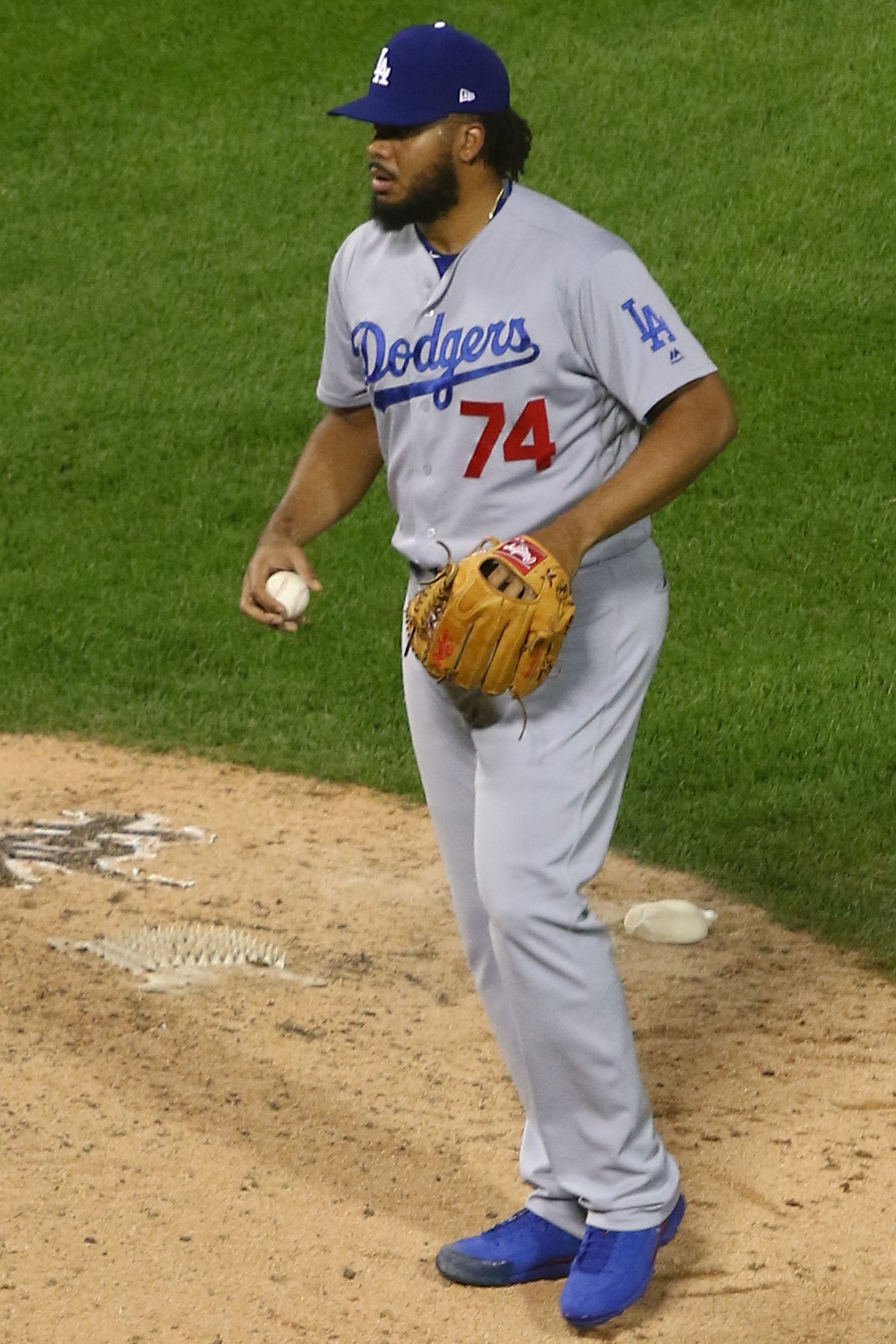
Jansen with the Los Angeles Dodgers in 2017

On January 10, 2017, the Dodgers announced the re-signing of Jansen to a five-year, $80 million contract.

On June 11, he recorded his 200th career save. On June 2, Jansen recorded his 36th strikeout of the season, setting an MLB season record for most strikeouts without giving up a walk. The previous record was held by Cardinals starting pitcher Adam Wainwright, who struck out 35 batters before giving up a walk in the 2013 season. The streak eventually reached 51 strikeouts before he issued his first walk of the season, giving Nolan Arenado of the Colorado Rockies a base on balls on June 25. He was named to his second straight All-Star Game. Jansen pitched in 65 games for the Dodgers in 2017, with five wins, a 1.32 ERA, 109 strikeouts (with only seven walks) and 41 saves. For the second straight year, he was awarded the National League Reliever of the Year Award.

Jansen started the playoffs by finishing all three games of the Dodgers 2017 NLDS sweep of the Diamondbacks. He saved two of the games and did not allow an earned run in 3 2/3 innings. He pitched 4 1/3 innings over four games in the 2017 NLCS against the Cubs and did not allow a batter to reach base while striking out eight. Jansen allowed two runs to score, including a solo homer by Marwin González in Game Two of the 2017 World Series against the Houston Astros. It was his first blown save in the postseason and snapped his MLB record of converting his first 12 post-season save opportunities. In Game Five of the series, he picked up the loss in the Dodgers 10 inning defeat. In his second inning of work, he hit Brian McCann with two outs and then after a walk, he gave up a walk-off single to Alex Bregman. Overall, he pitched 8 2/3 innings over six games, with two saves and three runs allowed as the Dodgers lost the series in seven games.

==== 2018 ====
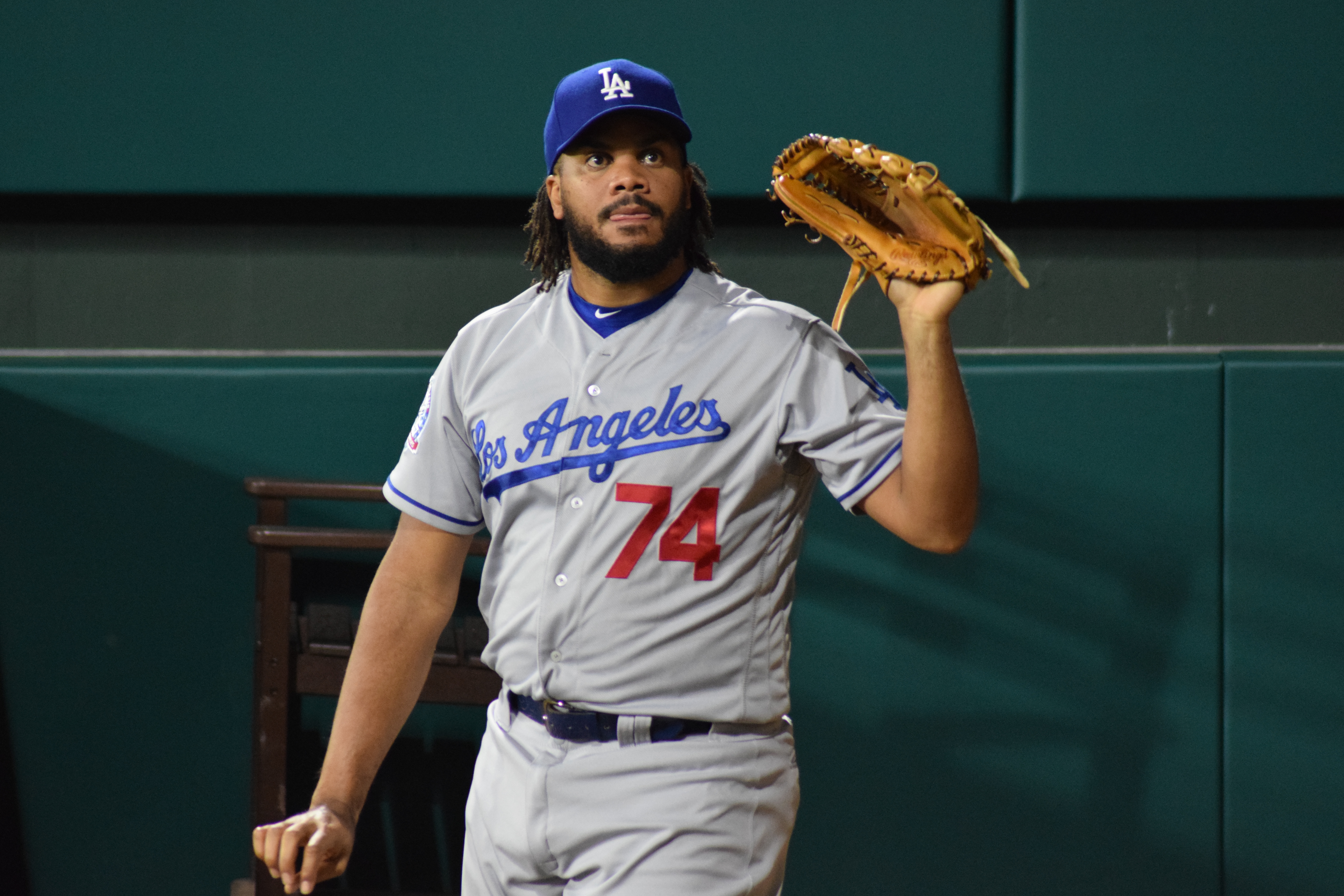
Jansen with the 2018 Los Angeles Dodgers

Jansen was bothered by an injury during spring training and was slow-played after his 2017 workload, resulting in two blown saves during a shaky April. He turned it around in May, June, and July and was chosen for his third straight all-star game in 2018.

Jansen's heart problems resurfaced during a four-game set in Colorado, and Jansen was placed on the 10-day disabled list with an irregular heartbeat. He struggled upon returning, losing his first two games back and blowing a save in his third. He struggled for the rest of the season. He finished the season with a 1–5 record, 3.01 ERA and 38 saves.

He was effective against Atlanta and Milwaukee in the postseason, not allowing a run, but again struggled in the 2018 World Series, blowing two save opportunities as he allowed game-tying home runs to Jackie Bradley Jr. in Game 3 (which went 18 innings) and Steve Pearce in Game 4 as the Dodgers lost the series to the Boston Red Sox in five games.

==== 2019 ====
On April 7, 2019, Jansen recorded a four-out save against the Colorado Rockies at Coors Field in Denver. On May 3 and 4, Jansen converted saves against the San Diego Padres. But on May 5, pitching for the third day in a row, Jansen walked a batter and allowed two bunt singles to load the bases with no outs. He retired the next two hitters before he gave up a walk-off grand slam to Hunter Renfroe, as the Dodgers lost 8–5.

Jansen recorded two extended saves in a series against the Mets, with a 5-out save in the first game of the series and a 4-out save in the fourth game. This was his first five-out save since June 2018 in Pittsburgh. He debuted the intentional balk in the top of the ninth against the Chicago Cubs on June 15, 2019. The intentional balk was an idea he came up with bench coach Bob Geren, in which he has a runner on second and two outs and balks the runner to third to prevent the runner from stealing signs. On September 25, in a game against the San Diego Padres, Jansen picked up his 300th career save, becoming the 30th pitcher all time and the first in Dodgers history. He pitched in 62 games, with a 5–3 record and 33 saves, but a career-high ERA of 3.71.

In the 2019 NLDS, Jansen pitched to five batters and did not allow any of them to reach base.

==== 2020 ====
Jansen was late reporting to camp after the pandemic-imposed shutdown, suffering with a COVID-19 infection, which affected his conditioning during the shutdown. He appeared in 24.1 innings over 27 games during the season, with a 3–1 record and a 3.33 ERA with 11 saves (third in the NL), while leading the National League with 24 games finished. Jansen pitched one scoreless inning in the first game of the Wild Card Series to pick up the save and in the NLDS he allowed two runs to score in 1 1/3 innings. He picked up a save and pitched three perfect innings over three games in the NLCS. In Game 4 of the 2020 World Series against the Tampa Bay Rays, Jansen blew his fourth career World Series save, setting a new World Series record.

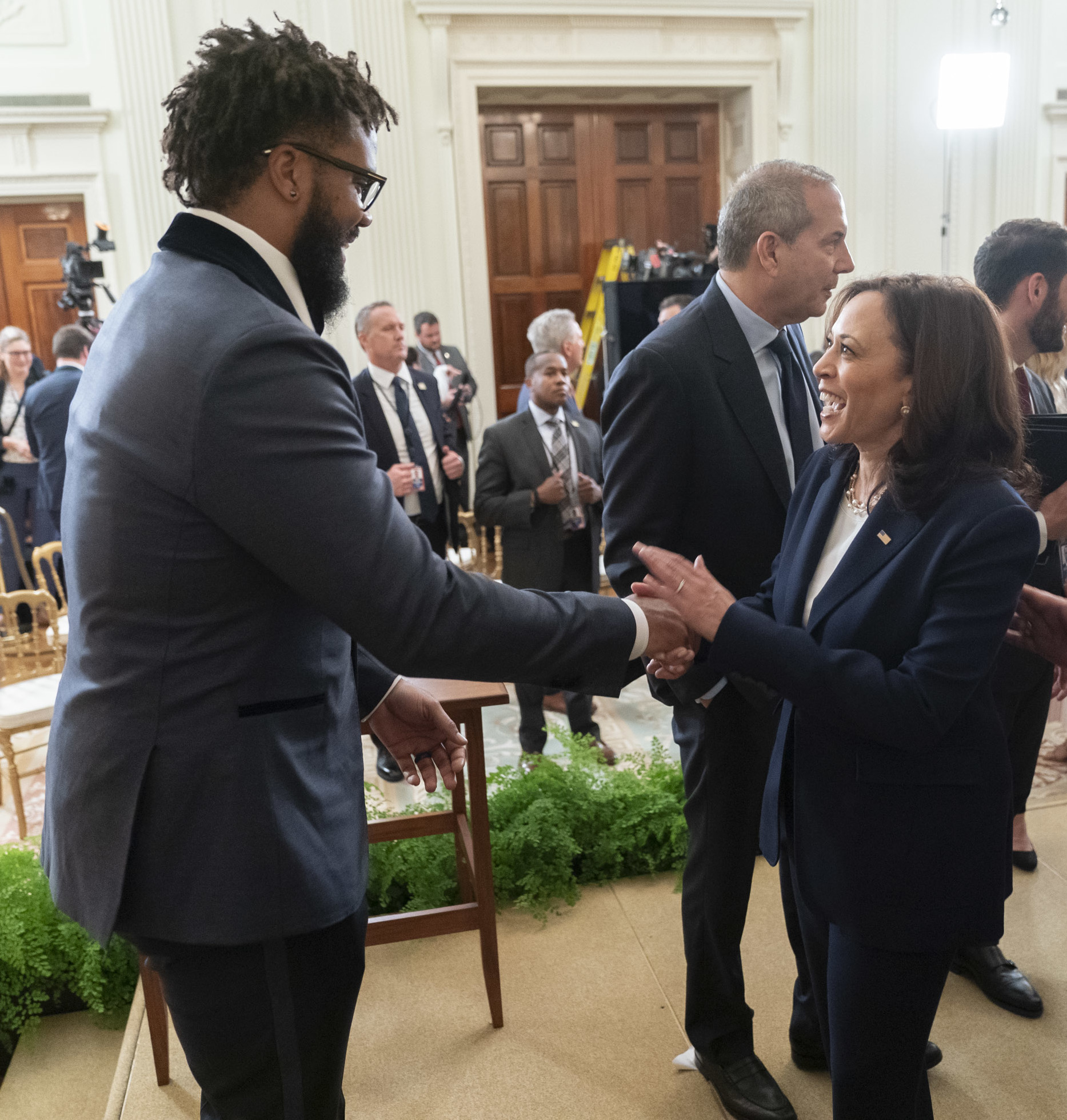
Jansen shaking hands with United States Vice President Kamala Harris at the White House in 2021

==== 2021 ====
On August 25, Jansen became the twelfth reliever in MLB history to record 1,000 strikeouts by striking out Austin Nola of the San Diego Padres. Jansen finished the 2021 season with 38 saves, a 2.22 ERA and 86 strikeouts in 69 innings. In the National League Wild Card Game against the St. Louis Cardinals, he struck out three batters in a scoreless ninth inning to record the win and in the 2021 NLDS, he struck out five of the six batters he faced in his two innings of work. In the 2021 NLCS, played against the Atlanta Braves, Jansen, pitched in five of the six games, allowing two hits and one walk while striking out six and recording the save in Game 3.

=== Atlanta Braves (2022) ===
Jansen signed a one-year contract worth $16 million with the Atlanta Braves on March 18, 2022. He made his Braves debut on April 8, surrendering three earned runs in the ninth inning against the Cincinnati Reds in a non-save situation. On April 19, Jansen returned to Dodger Stadium and was met with a mixture of cheers and boos from Dodger fans as he entered the game. He collected the save against his former team, retiring former Brave Freddie Freeman for the final out of the game.

=== Boston Red Sox (2023–2024) ===
On December 13, 2022, Jansen signed a two-year contract with the Boston Red Sox. On May 10, 2023, Jansen became the seventh pitcher in MLB history to record 400 saves. He was named to his fourth All-Star Game on July 2, as the lone Red Sox representative. Jansen abruptly left a home game against the Yankees on September 12; the next day, he was placed on the COVID-related injured list; he was reactivated on September 23. For the 2023 season, Jansen notched 29 saves with a 3.63 ERA while striking out 52 batters in 44 2/3 innings.

Jansen began the 2024 season as Boston's closer. On April 20, he earned the 425th save of his career, passing John Franco for sole possession of fifth place on the major-league all-time list. Jansen finished the 2024 season with 27 saves, a 3.29 ERA, and 62 strikeouts in 54 2/3 innings.

=== Los Angeles Angels (2025) ===
On February 11, 2025, Jansen signed a one-year, $10 million contract with the Los Angeles Angels. He saved 29 games in 30 opportunities for the Angels in 2025, with a 2.59 ERA and 57 strikeouts over 59 innings pitched.

=== Detroit Tigers (2026–present) ===
On December 17, 2025, Jansen signed a one-year, $9 million contract with the Detroit Tigers. The contract has a $12 million club option for the 2027 season with a $2 million buyout.

On April 14, 2026 against the Kansas City Royals, Jansen earned his third save of the season and the 479th of his career, passing Lee Smith for third place on the MLB's all-time saves list. He spent time on the injured list from late May to mid-June with right pelvic inflammation and groin discomfort. For the season, he pitched in 50 games, compiling 22 saves in 28 save chances, a 3.20 ERA, and 51 strikeouts in 45 innings. On November 2, 2026, the Tigers declined the 2027 option, paying the $2 million buyout which made Jansen a free agent.

== International career ==
Jansen has represented the Netherlands at three of the four World Baseball Classics. In 2009, he was the starting catcher for the Netherlands team in the World Baseball Classic. In the Netherlands' upset of the favored Dominican Republic team, Jansen threw out Willy Taveras on an attempted steal of third base in the ninth inning, a key play in the game. Jansen was a late addition to the Netherlands national baseball team for the 2013 World Baseball Classic, he had transitioned to pitching in late 2009, and he was added to the roster for the semi-finals but did not appear in the game.

After initially saying he would not pitch in the 2017 tournament, having signed a five-year $80 million contract with the Dodgers in the offseason, Jansen again joined the team when they advanced to the semi-finals. Jansen appeared in the team's game against Team Puerto Rico, which included Dodgers teammate Kike Hernandez. Jansen pitched a scoreless 9th inning, striking out two, but team Netherlands lost on a walk-off sacrifice fly in the 11th inning. He represented the Netherlands national baseball team at the 2023 World Baseball Classic and 2026 World Baseball Classic.

== Pitching style ==
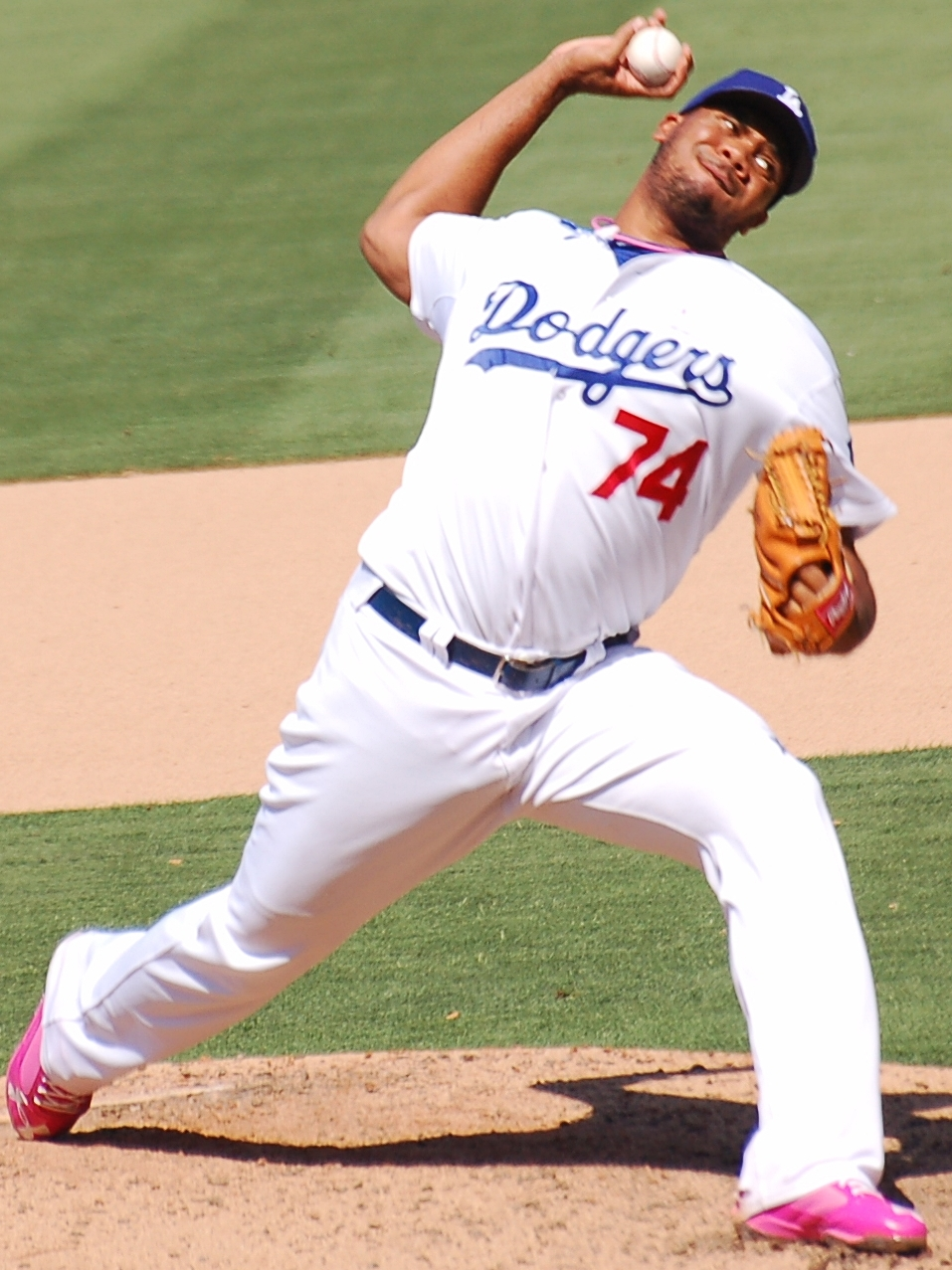
Jansen mid-pitch with the Dodgers in 2015

Jansen relies almost exclusively on a cut fastball (cutter) that mostly ranges from 90 to 94 miles per hour (mph). Earlier in his career, he was able to throw the pitch at 98 mph, and he exceeded 100 mph in 2014. Through his career, his cutter has averaged some of the highest vertically induced movement of any pitch in the league, averaging as much as 19 inches of rise in the 2012 season. Towards the end of that same season, Jansen introduced a four-seam fastball, which was phased out in the 2017 season with a two-seam fastball that ranges from 91 to 95 mph. His primary breaking pitch is a slider in the low to mid-80s. He experimented with a changeup in the 2009–2011 seasons as well as a sweeper in the 2024–2025 seasons.

Jansen has recorded exceptional high strikeout rates, averaging 12.3 strikeouts per 9 innings pitched through the 2026 season. This is the third-highest total in history among relief pitchers who have thrown at least 700 innings (behind Craig Kimbrel and Aroldis Chapman).

== Health issues ==
Jansen was diagnosed in 2011 with an irregular heartbeat (specifically, atrial fibrillation), and he missed some time that season while he was placed on blood thinners to prevent clots. The problem resurfaced late in the 2012 season, and he again missed considerable time while being treated. On October 24, 2012, Jansen underwent a 3-hour catheter ablation procedure in which Koonwalee Nademanee identified abnormal tissue in his left atrium and cauterized it to stop it from generating abnormal electrical signals.

Jansen suffered a recurrence of his irregular heartbeat before a game in Denver on August 9, 2018. He was placed on the 10-day disabled list and the team reported he would likely miss a month of the season. Doctors determined the condition could be controlled with medication until the offseason, so Jansen returned to the hill just 11 days later. However, the heart medication he took, which included beta blockers, had the side effects of leaving him feeling fatigued and unemotional. He gave up four home runs in his first two outings back, blowing both save opportunities, and after he protested the effects of his medication his doctors switched him to aspirin. Jansen stayed in Los Angeles when the Dodgers returned to Denver in September because he was at high risk of a stroke if he returned to elevation. Jansen completed the season and provided scoreless relief in seven of nine postseason appearances, allowing two runs in 10.2 innings (1.69 ERA).

On November 26, 2018, Jansen underwent a 5 1/2-hour heart ablation procedure, again performed by Koonlawee Nademanee, in Los Angeles. After the procedure the doctor told Jansen that small veins near the site of his 2012 procedure had grown and were agitated by dehydration, which caused the irregular signals that occurred in Denver. Jansen dedicated himself to a healthier diet after recovering from the operation and reported to spring training 25 pounds lighter. He no longer has to take blood-thinning medication.

On July 12, 2020, Jansen reported to summer training camp for the first time after recovering from COVID-19.

In June 2022, Jansen again dealt with an irregular heartbeat.

== Personal life ==
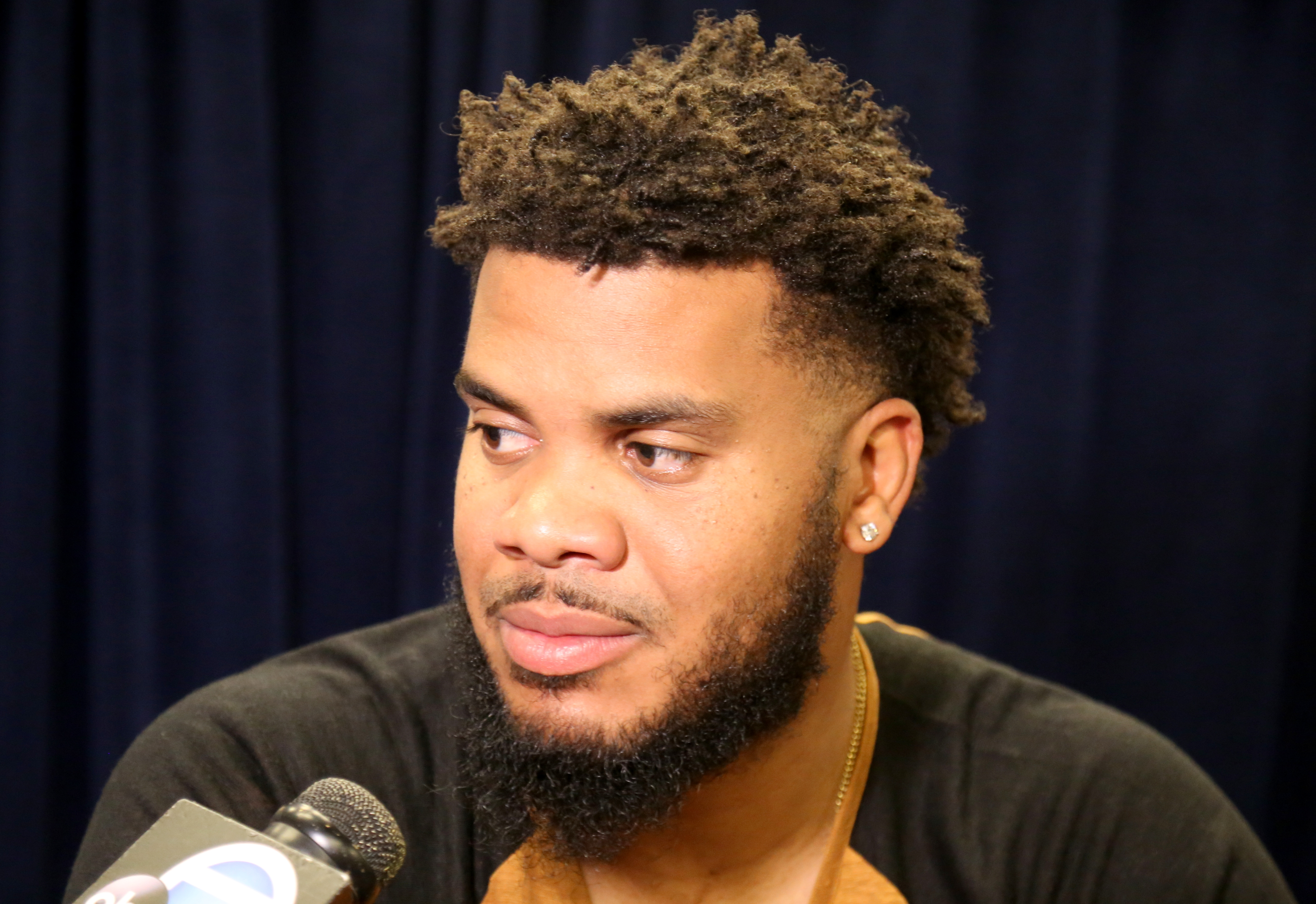
Jansen in 2016

Jansen spends most of his off-season break back home in Curaçao. Kenley is married to a Curaçao native named Gianni Jansen-Fransisca. He has two daughters, Natalia Hannah Jansen, who was born on March 16, 2013, and Key’Gia Keziah Jansen born on September 12, 2021, and two sons, Kaden Isaiah Jansen, born on August 16, 2015, and Kyrian Jeremiah Jansen, born on August 22, 2018. He throws right-handed but writes with his left hand. A local team in Curaçao, the Wildcats, have renamed themselves in honor of Jansen, and competed in the Latin American Series as Wildcats KJ74.

== See also ==
- List of Los Angeles Dodgers team records
- List of Major League Baseball career games finished leaders
- List of Major League Baseball career saves leaders
- List of Major League Baseball single-inning strikeout leaders
- List of Major League Baseball players from the Netherlands Antilles
- Los Angeles Dodgers award winners and league leaders

Awards and achievements
Preceded by Greg Holland	National League Reliever of the Month; June 2017	Succeeded by Brad Hand
Preceded by Liam Hendriks	National League Reliever of the Month; July–August 2020	Succeeded by Devin Williams
Preceded by Josh Hader	American League Reliever of the Month; July 2025	Succeeded by Aroldis Chapman
