= Matt Wieters =

American baseball player (born 1986)

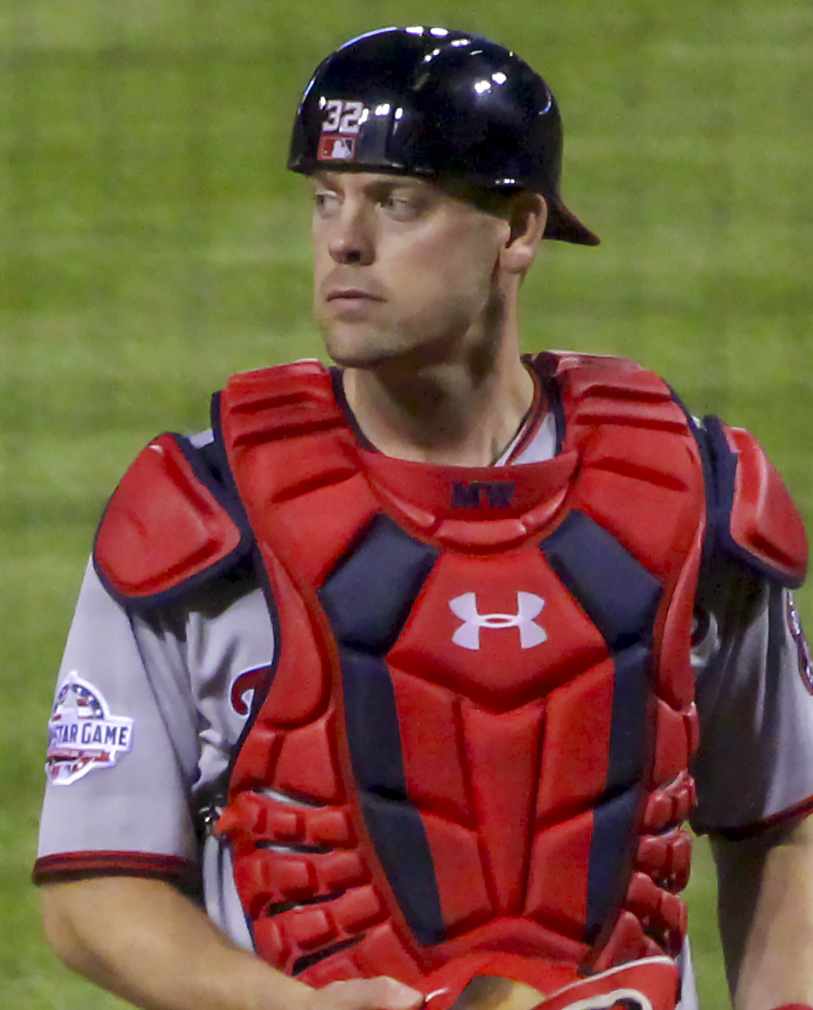
- Wieters with the Washington Nationals in 2018
- Catcher
- Born: May 21, 1986 (age 40); Goose Creek, South Carolina, U.S.
- Batted: Switch Threw: Right

MLB debut
- May 29, 2009, for the Baltimore Orioles

Last MLB appearance
- September 25, 2020, for the St. Louis Cardinals

MLB statistics
- Batting average: .249
- Home runs: 146
- Runs batted in: 550
- Stats at Baseball Reference

Teams
- Baltimore Orioles (2009–2016); Washington Nationals (2017–2018); St. Louis Cardinals (2019–2020)

Career highlights and awards
- 4× All-Star (2011, 2012, 2014, 2016); 2× Gold Glove Award (2011, 2012)

Matthew Richard Wieters (/ˈwiːtərz/; born May 21, 1986) is an American former professional baseball catcher. He played in Major League Baseball (MLB) for the Baltimore Orioles, Washington Nationals, and St. Louis Cardinals.

Wieters played college baseball for Georgia Tech and was drafted by the Baltimore Orioles with the fifth overall selection in the 2007 MLB draft. He made his MLB debut in 2009. Wieters is a four-time MLB All-Star and has won two Gold Glove Awards. Wieters played for the Orioles through the 2016 season before becoming a free agent. He has also played for the Washington Nationals and St. Louis Cardinals.

== Early life ==
Wieters was born on May 21, 1986, in Goose Creek, South Carolina. He played high school baseball at Stratford High School in Goose Creek, South Carolina. He played under Coach John Chalus, where he and the Knights made it to the AAAA state championship series.

== College ==
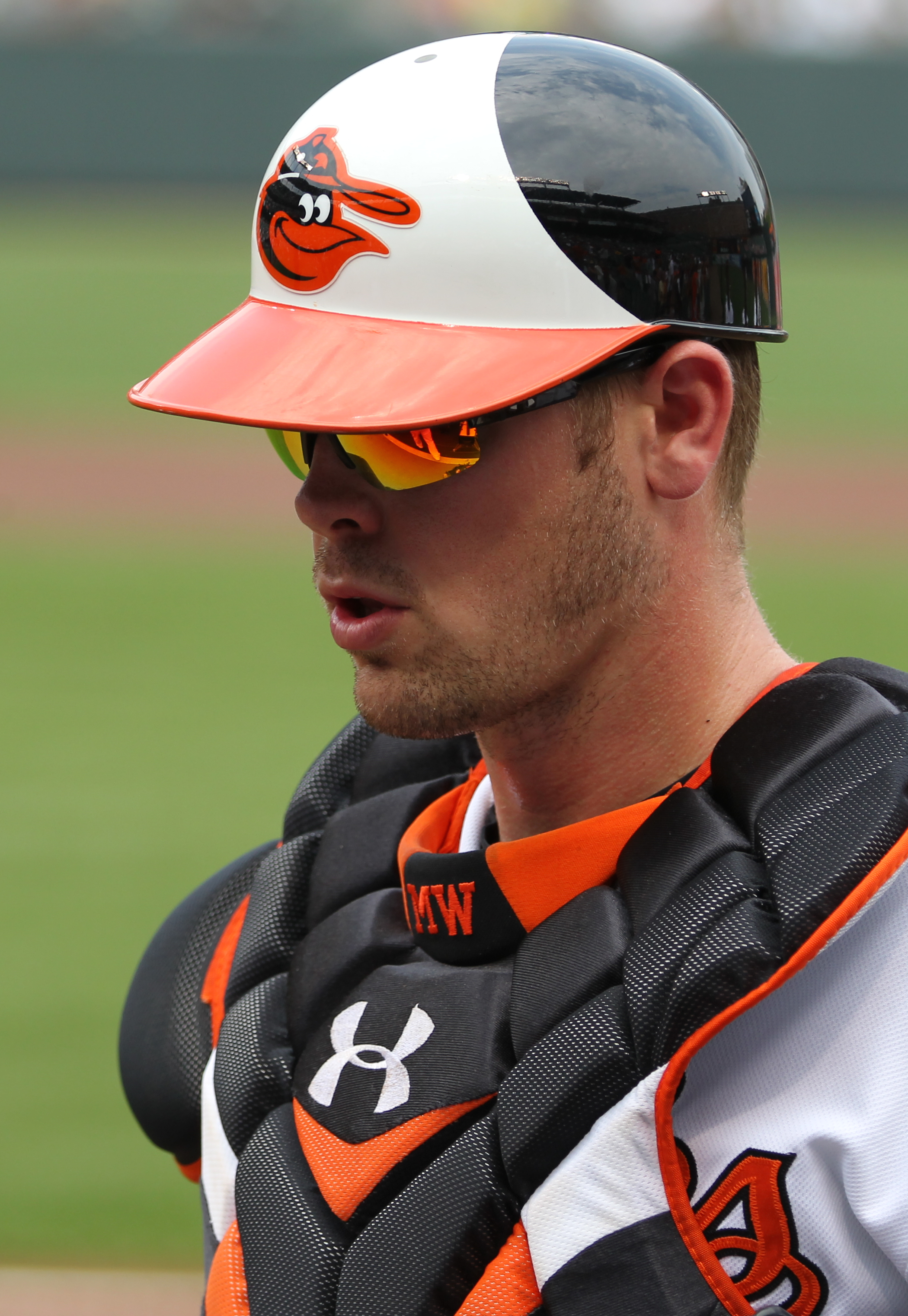
Wieters with the Orioles in 2011

Wieters attended the Georgia Institute of Technology and played college baseball for the Georgia Tech Yellow Jackets. He is one of just three players in Georgia Tech history to earn first-team All-America honors on at least two occasions. He was named a first-team All-America by Rivals.com and first-team All-Atlantic Coast Conference in 2007, first-team All-America by Baseball America and second-team All-ACC in 2006, and the ACC Rookie of the Year, Freshman All-America and first-team All-ACC in 2005.

In 2006, Wieters played collegiate summer baseball for the Orleans Cardinals of the Cape Cod Baseball League (CCBL). He hit .307 with eight home runs for Orleans, and was named the league's outstanding pro prospect. Wieters was inducted into the CCBL Hall of Fame in 2013.

Wieters finished his junior season ranked tied for sixth in the Yellow Jacket record books with 54 career doubles with 198 runs batted in along with 16 saves in his three years on the Flats. He also ranked 13th with a .359 career batting average and 418 total bases, tying for 16th with 35 home runs and 18th with 253 hits in his college career. He finished 2007 having played in 169 consecutive games. Wieters served as Tech's primary closer for his first two years and as one of two closers his junior season.

== Professional career ==
Wieters was drafted by the Baltimore Orioles with the 5th overall pick of the 2007 amateur draft and signed a contract with a $6 million signing bonus on August 15, 2007. That winter, he played for the Honolulu Sharks, hitting .283 in 31 games with one home run, 17 runs batted in, nine doubles, one triple, 44 total bases, and 12 walks.

=== Minor leagues ===
Going into the 2008 season, he was ranked 12th by Baseball America on their 2008 Top 100 Prospects List and was the highest ranked catcher on the list. He attended 2008 spring training with the Orioles, starting the season with their Class A affiliate the Frederick Keys. He gained a midseason promotion to the Double-A Bowie Baysox.

In 130 games for the Keys and Baysox, hit a combined .355 BA/.454 OBP/.600 SLG with 27 home runs and 91 RBI. Wieters earned the 2008 Minor League Player of the Year honors from Baseball America. According to Clay Davenport's measure EqA, Wieters had one of the single best seasons in recorded minor league history. His EqAs of .301 and .349 were the highest marks in their respective leagues in the last 40 years (although this would later turn out to be partially a result of inflated league difficulty factors).

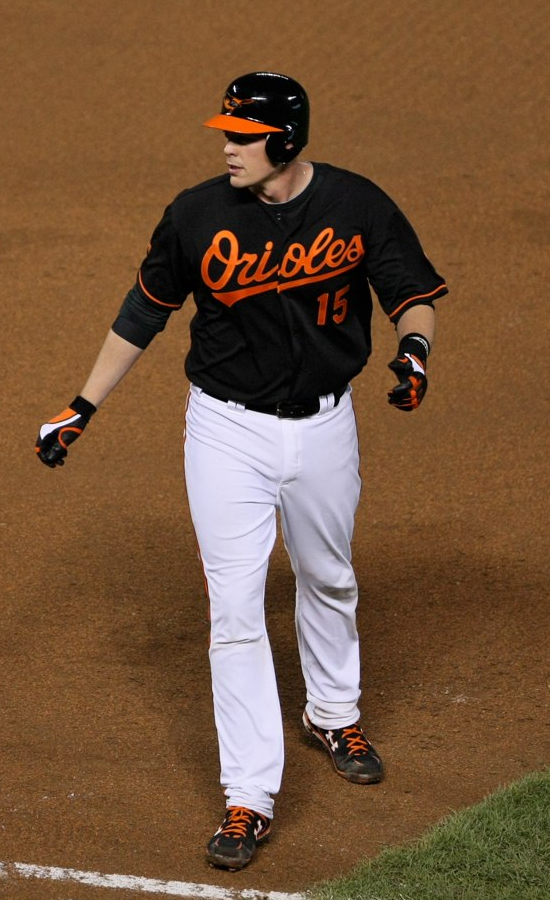
Wieters made his Major League Baseball debut on May 29, 2009.

Wieters participated in the 2008 Arizona Fall League season, playing for the Surprise Rafters. He was also selected to play in the Fall League's Rising Stars game. Wieters hit .343 in 35 spring training at bats for the Orioles in 2009, but was sent down to Triple-A Norfolk to start the season.

He was named the No. 2 prospect in MiLB by Minor League News in the MLN FAB50 Baseball 2009 rankings.

=== Baltimore Orioles ===
==== 2009 ====
Wieters made his major league debut on May 29, 2009, against the Detroit Tigers. Wieters' first major league hit came the next night, a triple, off of Detroit's Justin Verlander. Wieters hit his first career home run June 17 against the Mets, a two-run home run off of Mets starter Tim Redding. Wieters changed his jersey number after his rookie season from 15 to 32, which was what he wore in college at Georgia Tech.

==== 2010 ====
Although Wieters disappointed some observers because of his difficulties handling the Baltimore pitching staff, he established himself as a solid defensive catcher in 2010, throwing out many runners, while also hitting for power and a fairly good average at the plate.

==== 2011 ====
Wieters earned a Fielding Bible Award and a Gold Glove in 2011 as the best defensive catcher in MLB, and American League, respectively.

==== 2012 ====
On April 16, 2012, Wieters helped the Orioles rally to beat the Chicago White Sox in 10 innings by hitting his first career grand slam. On May 29, Wieters was ejected for the first time in his career for arguing that two pitches thrown by Miguel Gonzalez were strikes, not balls, as ruled by home plate umpire Doug Eddings. The Orioles lost the game against the Blue Jays, 8–6.

On July 1, 2012, Wieters was selected to represent the Orioles in the All Star Game for the second consecutive year. On October 30 it was announced that he had won his second consecutive Gold Glove.

==== 2013 ====
On Opening Day, April 2, 2013, Wieters became the first Oriole to ever hit a home run against Tampa Bay Rays starter David Price, a two-run shot in the top of the first. On April 18, Wieters helped to beat the Rays again by hitting a walk-off grand slam in the bottom of the 10th. Wieters was the first Oriole to hit a walk-off grand slam since Harold Baines in 1999.

While Wieters did finish 2013 with a career-low batting average of .235, he also hit 22 home runs and a career-high 29 doubles, as well as leading all MLB hitters with 12 sacrifice flies.

==== 2014 ====
On May 11, 2014, Wieters was hitting over .300 when an elbow injury of his throwing arm put him on the 15-day disabled list. He was still on the disabled list on June 11, when he was the leading American League catcher in the vote to determine the All Star Game starters. Orioles broadcaster Gary Thorne reported that Wieters was unlikely to play in the All Star Game even if he won the vote. On June 16, the Orioles announced that Wieters would undergo Tommy John elbow reconstruction surgery the next day, ending his 2014 campaign. The surgery was successful.

Wieters only played in 26 games in 2014 and was off to the best start of his career. In 26 games, he slashed .308/.339/.500 with five doubles, five home runs, 18 RBIs, while also scoring 13 runs. The Orioles would go on to win the division with rookie catcher Caleb Joseph and veteran catcher Nick Hundley (for whom the team had traded) platooning behind the dish.

==== 2015 ====
Wieters began the 2015 season on the 15-day disabled list in an effort to continue recovering from last year's Tommy John surgery. Wieters returned to the Orioles on June 5 and became an immediate impact in their lineup. On July 27, Wieters hit his fourth career walk-off home run, helping the Orioles's beat the Atlanta Braves by a score of 2–1. Wieters would end up slashing .267/.319/.422 in 75 games for the Orioles in 2015. He collected 69 hits, eight home runs, and also drove in 25 runs.

Wieters had a chance to become a free agent at the end of the 2015 season, but on November 13 he accepted the Orioles' $15.8 million qualifying offer and remained with the club.

==== 2016 ====
On Opening Day, Wieters delivered a walk-off RBI single up the middle to score Chris Davis, as the Orioles won their sixth consecutive opening day by a score of 3–2. It was Wieters' 700th career hit and also his eighth career walk-off hit, placing him fourth on the Orioles all-time list.

Wieters made the All-star team as the backup catcher for the AL squad, after posting a .258/.310/.418 slash with nine home runs and 37 RBIs. Wieters went 0-for-2 during the game, as the AL won 4–2.

On August 14, Wieters collected a career-high five hits after going 5-for-5, scoring two runs, and having a double and triple in an 8–7 Orioles comeback victory over the San Francisco Giants. He was the first Oriole catcher since 1991 to have a 5-hit game and only the third catcher in Orioles history to do so. On August 30, Wieters hit a game-winning two-run homer against the Toronto Blue Jays in the eighth inning, securing a 5–3 victory for the Orioles.

On September 10, Wieters hit two home runs against the Detroit Tigers, giving him his sixth career multi-home run game. On September 23, Wieters hit a game-tying solo home run in the ninth inning of a game against the Arizona Diamondbacks, a game in which the Orioles would go on to walk off in the 12th inning. In the final game of the season, Wieters hit two two-run home runs, one from each side of the plate, becoming the first Orioles switch hitter to do so in the same game since Roberto Alomar, who did it on July 25, 1996. It was his seventh career multi-home run game.

Wieters ended his regular season having played in 124 games, slashing .243/.302/.409 with 17 home runs and 66 RBIs. After the season, his contract expired, becoming a free agent for the first time of his career.

=== Washington Nationals ===
On February 24, 2017, Wieters signed a one-year, $10.5 million contract with the Washington Nationals. His contract included a $10.5 million player option for the 2018 season. Wieters continued wearing #32 after relief pitcher Koda Glover agreed to change his number to #30 to accommodate his new teammate. In 2017, Wieters played in 123 games, batting .225 with ten home runs and 52 RBIs. Following the year, Wieters exercised his contract option for the 2018 season. He played in 76 games in 2018 where he hit .238 with eight home runs and 30 RBIs.

=== St. Louis Cardinals ===
On February 26, 2019, Wieters signed a minor league contract, with an invitation to spring training, with the St. Louis Cardinals. He made the opening day roster and had his contract purchased. For the season, Wieters appeared in 67 games as a backup to Yadier Molina, batting .214 with 11 home runs and 27 RBIs.

On January 19, 2020, Wieters agreed to a one-year, $2 million contract with the Cardinals to return for the 2020 season. He appeared in 19 games and hit .200 with no home runs.

=== International play ===
In May 2021, Wieters announced his plans to play for Team USA in the 2021 Summer Olympics. He was dropped from the roster for the qualifying round.

== Coaching career ==
On October 27, 2022, Wieters was named student assistant coach at his alma mater, Georgia Tech.

== Personal life ==
Wieters and his wife have two children. Wieters is a Christian and spoke about his faith in a 2015 video for a website about Christian athletes.

In 2023, at age 36, Wieters returned to Georgia Tech as a student to complete the degree in business administration he had left behind when he was drafted in 2007.
