= Hilo Stars =

Information
- League: Hawaii Winter Baseball (1993–1997)
- Location: Hilo, Hawaii
- Ballpark: Wong Stadium
- Founded: 1993
- Disbanded: 1997
- League championships: 1 (1993)
- Division championships: 1 (1997)
- Former name(s): Hilo Stars (1993–1997)
- Colors: red, white, blue
- Ownership: Duane Kurisu
- General manager: Clyde Nekoba

The Hilo Stars were a minor league baseball team in the Hawaii Winter Baseball league. They were based in Hilo, Hawaii, and played their home games at Vulcan Field and Wong Stadium.

Former players include Ichiro Suzuki, Bill Mueller, Adam Kennedy, Shane Spencer, Preston Wilson, R.A. Dickey, and Tsuyoshi Shinjo.

== Team record ==
Season	W	L	Win %	Result
1993	28	20	.583	league champs
1994	17	26	.395	
1995	23	30	.434	
1996	19	30	.388	
1997	29	24	.547	division champs
