= North Shore Honu =

Information
- League: Hawaii Winter Baseball (2006–08)
- Location: Waipahu, Hawaii
- Ballpark: Hans L'Orange Field
- Founded: 2006
- Folded: 2008
- League championships: 2 (2006, 2007)
- Division championships: 2 (2006, 2007)
- Former name(s): North Shore Honu (2006–08)
- Colors: Green, Black, White
- Manager: Rob Farrow
- Website: Official website

The North Shore Honu were a minor league baseball team in the Hawaii Winter Baseball league. They were based in Waipahu, Hawaii. The name honu is the Hawaiian word for sea turtle. They played their home games at the Hans L'Orange Field.

== Notable alumni ==
- Ryan Kalish, Chicago Cubs outfielder
- Kenley Jansen, Atlanta Braves relief pitcher

== Team Record ==
Season	W	L	Win %	Result
2006	18	17	.514	league champs
2007	26	12	.684	league champs
2008	14	20	.412	
