= Honolulu Sharks =

Information
- League: Hawaii Winter Baseball (1993–2008)
- Location: Honolulu, Hawaii
- Ballpark: Les Murakami Baseball Stadium
- Founded: 1993
- Folded: 2008
- League championships: 1 (1997)
- Division championships: 3 (1995, 1996, 1997)
- Colors: Purple, Black, Grey, White
- Manager: Chris Freas

The Honolulu Sharks were a minor league baseball team in the Hawaii Winter Baseball league based in Honolulu, Hawaii. The Sharks name comes from the large number of shark species native to the waters of Hawaii. They played their home games at the Les Murakami Baseball Stadium.

== Notable players and alumni ==
- Jeff Banister, manager during the 1996 season, later manager of the Texas Rangers
- Gabe Kapler (born 1975), major league baseball outfielder and manager, 2021 NL Manager of the Year
- Matt Wieters, drafted by the Baltimore Orioles in 2007 (4x all star, Georgia Tech) played for the Sharks in 2007.

== Team Record ==
Season	W	L	Win %	Result
1993	29	25	.537	
1994	21	28	.429	
1995	29	23	.558	division champs
1996	36	16	.692	division champs
1997	27	27	.500	league champs
2006	16	21	.432	
2007	17	20	.459	
2008	17	18	.486	
