= Hawaii Winter Baseball =

American professional baseball league

- Hawaii Winter Baseball logo
- Sport: Baseball
- Founded: 1993; 33 years ago
- Folded: 2008; 18 years ago
- No. of teams: 4
- Country: United States
- Last champion: North Shore Honu
- Website: www.hawaiiwinterbaseball.com

Hawaii Winter Baseball (HWB), based in Honolulu, Hawaii, was a professional baseball league in the Hawaiian islands. It was loosely affiliated with Major League Baseball (MLB).

== History ==
The HWB league first began play in 1993. Funded by Major League Baseball, the league drew players from the MLB, Nippon Professional Baseball, the Korea Baseball Organization, and independent leagues. Games were played in Hawaii from October to December. The HWB league first folded after the 1997 season as it was too heavily reliant on its limited funding from MLB.

In 2006, the league returned for its sixth season. It was the only winter league to feature both top Japanese and American talent. However, this new league folded following the 2008 season when the contract with MLB expired.

=== Alumni ===
Todd Helton was the first Hawaii Winter Baseball alumni inducted into the National Baseball Hall of Fame (2024). Ichiro Suzuki was the second, inducted in July 2025.

- Aaron Boone
- Aaron Fultz
- Adam Kennedy
- Alex Ochoa
- Armando Almanza
- Atsunori Inaba
- Atsushi Nohmi
- A. J. Pierzynski
- Austin Jackson
- Ben Petrick
- Benny Agbayani
- Bill Mueller
- Blake DeWitt
- Brad Clontz
- Brad Fullmer
- Brian Cooper
- Bud Norris
- Buster Posey
- Chris Singleton
- Chris Truby
- Chris Widger
- Craig Counsell
- Daniel Bard
- Daniel Murphy
- Derrek Lee
- Dexter Fowler
- Domonic Brown
- Doug Mirabelli
- Eli Marrero
- Eric Young, Jr.
- Ernie Young
- Eugene Kingsale
- Gabe Kapler
- Geoff Blum
- Hideki Okajima
- Hiroki Kokubo
- Ian Desmond
- Ian Kennedy
- Ichiro Suzuki
- Jacob Cruz
- Jason Castro
- Jason Giambi
- Jason Conti
- Jason Christiansen
- Jason Grilli
- Jeff Clement
- Jermaine Dye
- Joba Chamberlain
- Joe Roa
- John Mayberry, Jr.
- John Parrish
- Jonathan Lucroy
- Jonny Venters
- Julie Croteau
- Kazuo Matsui
- Kenji Johjima
- Kenley Jansen
- Kevin Gryboski
- Kirk Bullinger
- Kyle Drabek
- Marcus Jensen
- Mark Kotsay
- Matt Murray
- Matt Wieters
- Michael Barrett
- Mike Carp
- Nate Schierholtz
- Neil Wagner
- Nobuhiko Matsunaka
- Nyjer Morgan
- Quinton McCracken
- Randy Winn
- Ramón Ortiz
- Rick VandenHurk
- Ricky Stone
- Robert Fick
- Brian O'Connor
- Russ Ortiz
- Ryan Kalish
- Scott Sauerbeck
- Shane Halter
- Shane Spencer
- Shinya Miyamoto
- Steve Johnson
- So Taguchi
- Tadahito Iguchi
- Terrence Long
- Travis Driskill
- Todd Greene
- Tomotaka Sakaguchi
- Tsuyoshi Shinjo
- Todd Helton
- Yasushi Iihara
- Yoshiyuki Kamei
- Yusaku Iriki

== Former teams ==
- Hilo Stars
- Kauai Emeralds
- Kaneohe Bay Dawgs
- Kona Man O'Wars
- Kona Navigators
- Lahaina Whalers
- Maui Stingrays

The Kaneohe Bay Dawgs and Kona Man O'Wars were announced in August 1996 as expansions teams to begin play in 1997. The Kaneohe announcement was rescinded in October 1996, and Kona did not play in 1997.

=== 2006–2008 teams ===
East
Team	City	Stadium
Honolulu Sharks	Honolulu, Hawaii	Les Murakami Stadium
Waikiki BeachBoys	Honolulu, Hawaii	Les Murakami Stadium
West
Team	City	Stadium
North Shore Honu	Waipahu, Hawaii	Hans L'Orange Field
West Oahu CaneFires	Waipahu, Hawaii	Hans L'Orange Field

== Champions ==
- 1993 Hilo Stars (No play-off)
- 1994 Kauai Emeralds (No play-off)
- 1995 Maui Stingrays
- 1996 Maui Stingrays
- 1997 Honolulu Sharks
- 2006 North Shore Honu
- 2007 North Shore Honu (Play-off rained out)
- 2008 Waikiki BeachBoys
