= West Oahu CaneFires =

Information
- League: Hawaii Winter Baseball (1993–2008)
- Location: Waipahu, Hawaii
- Ballpark: Hans L'Orange Field
- Founded: 1993
- Folded: 2008
- League championships: 1 (1994)
- Division championships: 1 (2008)
- Former name(s): Kauai Emeralds (1993–94)
- Colors: Orange, Black, White, Yellow
- Ownership: Scotty Gelt
- General manager: Rob Farrow

The West Oahu CaneFires were a minor league baseball team in the Hawaii Winter Baseball league. They were based in Waipahu, Hawaii. The name CaneFires is derived from the burning of sugar cane before harvest on many plantations on the island of Oahu. They played their home games at Hans L'Orange Field.

The CaneFires began as the Kauai Emeralds, but changed their name when they moved to Oahu in 1995.

== Notable players ==
- Gabe Kapler (born 1975), major league baseball outfielder and manager, 2021 NL Manager of the Year
- Kenley Jansen, Atlanta Braves relief pitcher

== Team record ==
Season	W	L	Win %	Result
1993	27	25	.519	
1994	29	21	.580	league champs
1995	28	24	.538	
1996	20	30	.400	
1997	26	27	.491	
2006	18	18	.500	
2007	13	24	.351	
2008	19	14	.576	division champs
