= List of U.S. cities with significant Chinese-American populations =

U.S. cities with significant Chinese-American populations
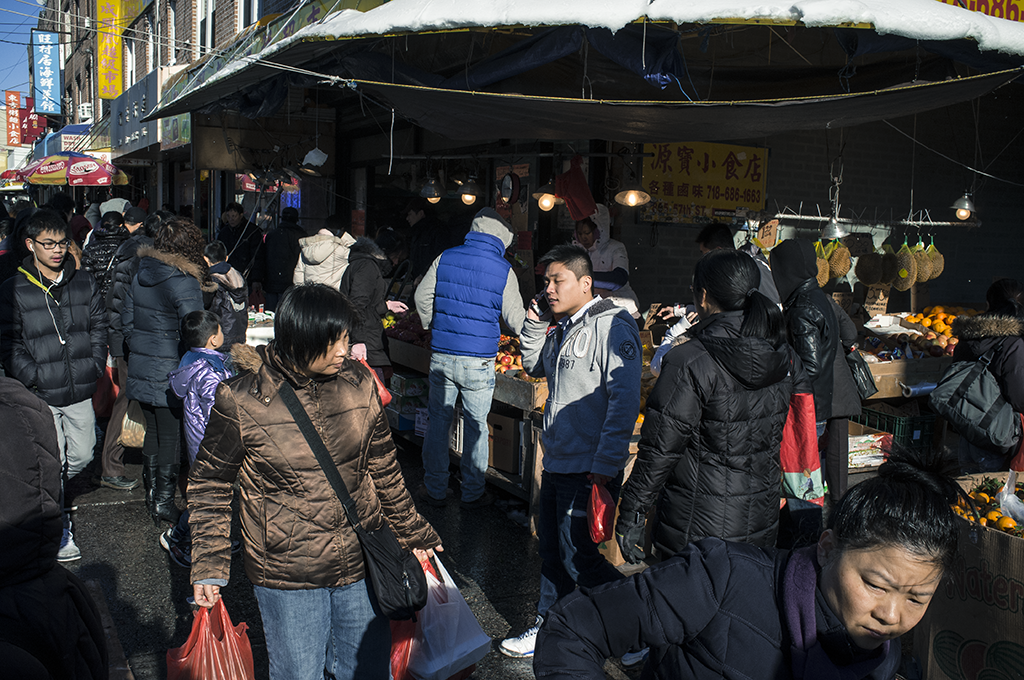
- New York City is home to the largest Chinese-American population of any city proper, with over half a million. Multiple large Chinatowns in Manhattan, Brooklyn (above), and Queens are thriving as traditionally urban enclaves, as large-scale Chinese immigration continues into New York, with the largest metropolitan Chinese population outside Asia.

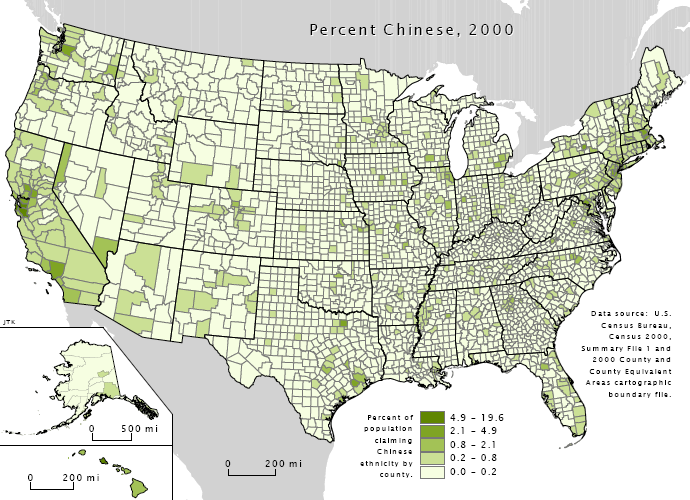

Cities considered to have significant Chinese-American populations are large U.S. cities or municipalities with a critical mass of at least 1% of the total urban population; medium-sized cities with a critical mass of at least 1% of their total population; and small cities with a critical mass of at least 10% of the total population.

According to the 2012 Census estimates, the three metropolitan areas with the largest Chinese-American populations were the Greater New York Combined Statistical Area at 735,019 people, the San Jose-San Francisco-Oakland Combined Statistical Area at 629,243 people, and the Greater Los Angeles Combined Statistical Area at about 566,968 people. In the post-1965 era, first- and second-generation immigrants include those from Mainland China, Hong Kong, Macau, and Taiwan. Also included in the Chinese-American population enumeration are ethnic Chinese from Malaysia and Vietnam who might identify themselves as Chinese, thus skewing the census reporting.

New York City is home to by far the highest Chinese-American population of any city proper, with an estimated 573,388 Chinese-Americans in New York City. Multiple large Chinatowns in Manhattan, Brooklyn (three), and Queens (three) are thriving as traditionally urban enclaves, as large-scale Chinese immigration continues into New York, with the largest metropolitan Chinese population outside Asia.

The Los Angeles County city of Monterey Park has the highest percentage of Chinese-Americans of any municipality, at 43.7% of its population, or 24,758 people. The San Gabriel Valley region of Los Angeles County is the single largest concentration of combined Chinese and Taiwanese Americans in the country, having a collections of U.S. suburbs with large foreign-born Chinese-speaking populations, ranging from working-class individuals residing in Rosemead and El Monte to wealthier immigrants living in Arcadia, San Marino, and Diamond Bar. A similar demographic shift has also taken place in the southern half of the San Francisco Bay Area. Conversely, the suburbs of New York City within the state of New Jersey are notable for their widespread and increasing prevalence of Chinese-Americans (see list below), reflecting their general affluence and propensity for professional occupation.

== Metropolitan areas with more than 20,000 Chinese-Americans ==
The list of metropolitan areas with a Chinese-American population of 20,000 or more as of the 2011-2015 American Community Survey.

Rank	MSA	Region	Chinese-Americans	Percentage
1	New York-Newark-Jersey City	Mid-Atlantic	739,144	3.7
2	Los Angeles-Long Beach-Anaheim	Pacific	528,248	4.0
3	San Francisco-Oakland-Hayward	Pacific	460,252	10.2
4	San Jose-Sunnyvale-Santa Clara	Pacific	169,026	8.8
5	Boston-Cambridge-Newton	New England	133,241	2.8
6	Chicago-Naperville-Elgin	East North Central	109,046	1.1
7	Washington-Arlington-Alexandria	South Atlantic	105,462	1.8
8	Seattle-Tacoma-Bellevue	Pacific	98,949	2.7
9	Houston-The Woodlands-Sugar Land	West South Central	86,246	1.4
10	Philadelphia-Camden-Wilmington	Mid-Atlantic	82,487	1.4
11	Sacramento-Roseville-Arden-Arcade	Pacific	61,203	2.8
12	Dallas-Fort Worth-Arlington	West South Central	57,325	0.8
13	San Diego-Carlsbad	Pacific	56,751	1.8
14	Urban Honolulu	Pacific	53,119	5.4
15	Riverside-San Bernardino-Ontario	Pacific	51,628	1.2
16	Atlanta-Sandy Springs-Roswell	South Atlantic	46,859	0.8
17	Miami-Fort Lauderdale-West Palm Beach	South Atlantic	34,210	0.6
18	Portland-Vancouver-Hillsboro	Pacific	31,533	1.4
19	Las Vegas-Henderson-Paradise	Pacific	30,329	1.5
20	Phoenix-Mesa-Scottsdale	Mountain	28,550	0.6
21	Minneapolis-St. Paul-Bloomington	West North Central	24,721	0.7
22	Detroit-Warren-Dearborn	East North Central	24,524	0.6
23	Baltimore-Columbia-Towson	South Atlantic	24,092	0.9
24	Austin-Round Rock	West South Central	20,182	1.1

== Large-sized cities ==
The list of large cities (population greater than 250,000) with a Chinese-American population of at least 1% of the total population, as of the 2011-2016 American Community Survey.

Rank	City	State	Chinese-Americans	Percentage
1	San Francisco (Note: San Francisco is a consolidated city-county.)	California	180,372	21.2
2	Irvine	California	34,022	13.8
3	Oakland	California	34,106	8.3
4	San Jose	California	75,582	7.5
5	New York (Note: Further subdivided into 5 boroughs which are also counties of its own rights.)	New York	562,205	6.6
6	Plano	Texas	14,822	5.3
7	Honolulu (Note: Honolulu is a consolidated city-county.)	Hawaii	51,149	5.2
8	Boston	Massachusetts	30,097	4.6
9	Seattle	Washington	30,223	4.5
10	Sacramento	California	21,691	4.5
11	Jersey City	New Jersey	8,420	3.3
12	San Diego	California	43,715	3.2
13	Fairfax (Note: Officially, a County under Urban County Executive Form of Government. (Essentially, a highly urbanized county-city.))	Virginia	28,806	2.5
14	Philadelphia (Note: Philadelphia is a consolidated city-county.)	Pennsylvania	35,451	2.3
15	Pittsburgh	Pennsylvania	6,677	2.2
16	Stockton	California	6,226	2.1
17	Portland	Oregon	12,222	2.0
18	Los Angeles	California	77,073	2.0
19	Chicago	Illinois	52,917	1.9
20	Austin	Texas	15,170	1.7
21	Durham	North Carolina	3,990	1.6
22	Houston	Texas	34,088	1.5
23	Riverside	California	4,491	1.4
24	Anaheim	California	4,908	1.4
25	Columbus	Ohio	9,788	1.2
26	Henderson	Nevada	3,329	1.2
27	Raleigh	North Carolina	4,692	1.1
28	Lexington (Note: Lexington is a consolidated city-county.)	Kentucky	3,078	1.0
29	Washington (Note: Washington is a federal district.)	District of Columbia	6,345	1.0
30	Long Beach	California	4,527	1.0

=== New York City boroughs ===
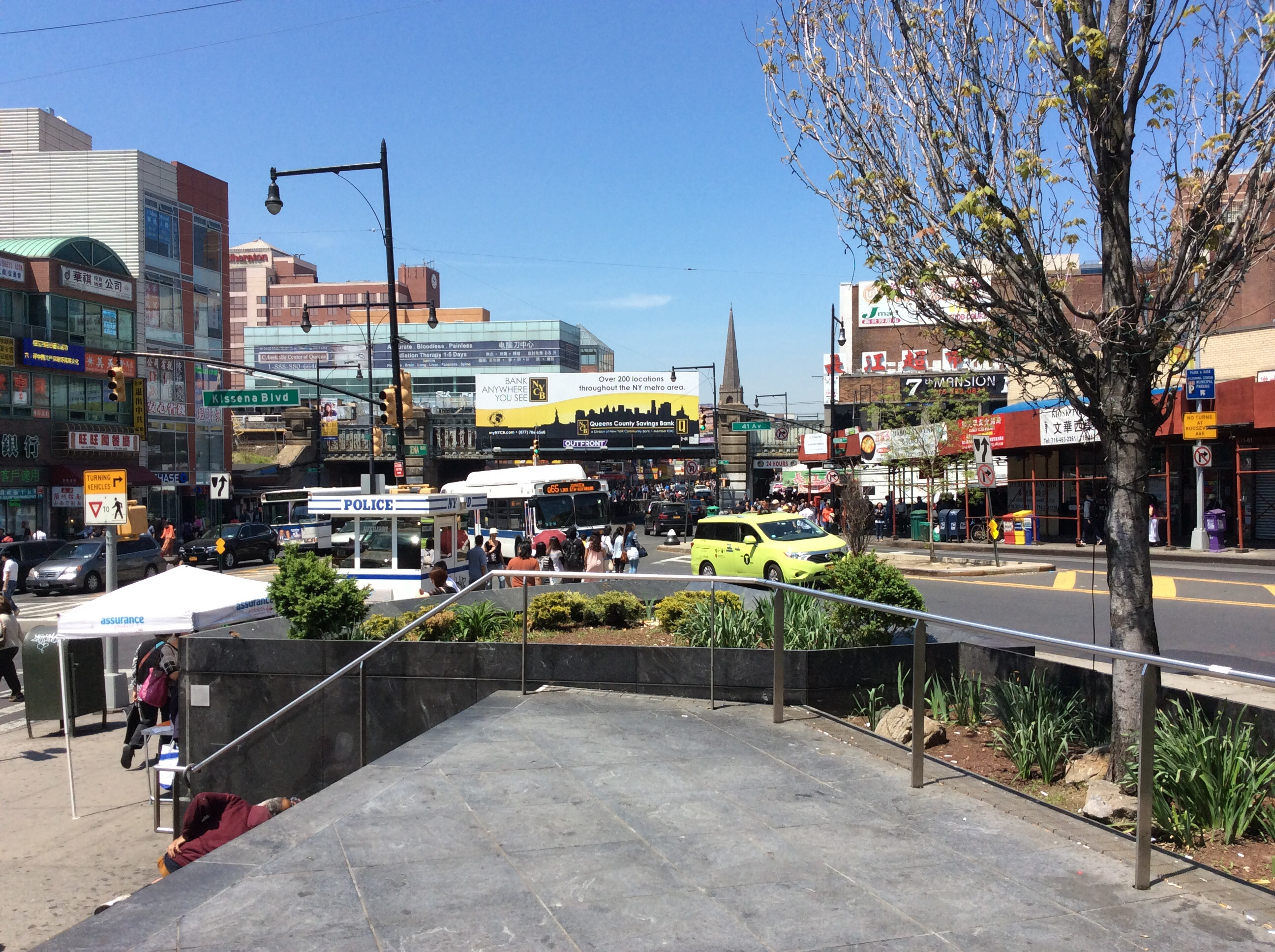
The busy intersection of Main Street, Kissena Boulevard, and 41st Avenue in the Flushing Chinatown (法拉盛華埠), Queens, New York City, the Chinese "Times Square". The segment of Main Street between Kissena Boulevard and Roosevelt Avenue, punctuated by the Long Island Rail Road trestle overpass, represents the cultural heart of Flushing Chinatown. Housing over 30,000 individuals born in China alone, the largest by this metric outside Asia, Flushing has become home to the largest and one of the fastest-growing Chinatowns in the world. Approximately 250,000 Chinese live in the Queens borough of New York City.

As the city proper with the nation's largest Chinese-American population by a wide margin, with an estimated 562,205 in 2016 by the 2010-2016 American Community Survey, and as the primary destination for new Chinese immigrants, New York City is subdivided into official municipal boroughs, which themselves are home to significant Chinese populations, with Brooklyn and Queens, adjacently located on Long Island, leading the fastest growth. After the City of New York itself, the boroughs of Queens and Brooklyn encompass the largest Chinese populations, respectively, of all municipalities in the United States.

Rank	Borough	County	Chinese-Americans	Percentage
1	Queens (Chinatowns)	Queens	232,317	10.1
2	Brooklyn (Chinatowns)	Kings	204,225	7.8
3	Manhattan (Chinatown)	New York	104,176	6.4
4	Staten Island	Richmond	14,416	3.0
5	The Bronx	Bronx	7,071	0.5

== Medium-sized cities ==
List of medium-sized cities (population between 100,000 and 250,000) with a Chinese-American population of at least one percent of the total population, according to the American Community Survey.

2010–2016
Rank	City	State	Chinese-Americans	Percentage
1	Daly City	California	20,048	19.0
2	Fremont	California	40,752	17.9
3	El Monte	California	20,190	17.5
4	Sunnyvale	California	19,395	13.0
5	Bellevue	Washington	15,804	11.6
6	West Covina	California	12,193	11.3
7	Berkeley	California	10,094	8.5
8	Elk Grove	California	10,758	6.6
9	Cambridge	Massachusetts	7,404	6.8
10	Pasadena	California	8,867	6.3
11	Ann Arbor	Michigan	7,998	6.8
12	Torrance	California	7,696	5.2
13	Spring Valley	Nevada	10,927	5.7
14	Richmond	California	5,523	5.1
15	Enterprise	Nevada	5,879	4.5
16	Hayward	California	6,930	4.5
17	Naperville	Illinois	6,584	4.5
18	Fullerton	California	5,328	3.8
19	Richardson	Texas	4,646	4.3
20	College Station	Texas	4,079	3.9
21	Thousand Oaks	California	3,889	3.0
22	Rancho Cucamonga	California	5,778	3.3
23	Cary	North Carolina	5,283	3.4
24	Pomona	California	4,867	3.2
25	Jersey City	New Jersey	8,420	3.2
26	Concord	California	3,607	2.8
27	Madison	Wisconsin	6,899	2.8
28	Tempe	Arizona	4,361	2.5
29	New Haven	Connecticut	2,635	2.0
30	Kent	Washington	3,273	2.6
31	Antioch	California	2,342	2.2
32	Chandler	Arizona	5,273	2.2
33	Orange	California	2,729	2.0
34	Columbia	Missouri	2,765	2.4
35	Arlington (Note: Officially, a County under County Manager Plan of government. (Essentially, a highly urbanized county with a population density of at least 500 people per square mile.))	Virginia	4,827	2.1
36	Huntington Beach	California	3,925	2.0
37	Boulder	Colorado	2,376	2.3
38	Gainesville	Florida	2,358	1.8
39	Glendale	California	3,818	1.9
40	Durham	North Carolina	3,990	1.6
41	Garden Grove	California	3,032	1.7
42	Stamford	Connecticut	1,884	1.5
43	Salt Lake City	Utah	3,037	1.6
44	Eugene	Oregon	2,487	1.6
45	Syracuse	New York	2,351	1.6
46	Norwalk	California	1,719	1.6
47	Providence	Rhode Island	2,647	1.5
48	Frisco	Texas	2,077	1.5
49	Miramar	Florida	1,993	1.5
50	Norman	Oklahoma	1,751	1.5
51	Carlsbad	California	1,701	1.5
52	Overland Park	Kansas	2,450	1.4
53	Costa Mesa	California	1,584	1.4
54	Rochester	Minnesota	1,507	1.4
55	Burbank	California	1,473	1.4
56	Simi Valley	California	1,606	1.3
57	Fairfield	California	1,407	1.3
58	Carrollton	Texas	1,605	1.3
59	Worcester	Massachusetts	2,311	1.3
60	Roseville	California	1,633	1.3
61	Corona	California	1,952	1.2
62	Vallejo	California	1,422	1.2
63	Vancouver	Washington	1,881	1.1
64	Fort Collins	Colorado	1,666	1.1
65	Denton	Texas	1,384	1.1
66	Pearland	Texas	1,112	1.1
67	Garland	Texas	2,278	1.0
68	Baton Rouge	Louisiana	2,207	1.0
69	Athens	Georgia	1,982	1.0

2005–2009
Rank	City	State	Chinese-Americans	Percentage
1	Fremont	California	34,678	17.3
2	Daly City	California	13,359	13.3
3	El Monte	California	15,339	12.7
4	Irvine	California	24,233	12.3
5	Sunnyvale	California	14,777	11.3
6	Bellevue	Washington	10,928	9.6
7	Berkeley	California	7,585	7.4
8	Cambridge	Massachusetts	5,772	5.4
9	Torrance	California	6,887	4.9
10	Pasadena	California	6,084	4.3
11	Ann Arbor	Michigan	6,364	5.6
12	Naperville	Illinois	5,399	3.8
13	Richardson	Texas	3,274	3.3
14	Thousand Oaks	California	3,794	3.0
15	Everett	Washington		2.5
16	Concord	California	2,960	2.4
17	Cary	North Carolina	2,128	2.3
18	Madison	Wisconsin	4,617	2.0
19	Huntington Beach	California	3,804	2.0
20	Tempe	Arizona	3,413	2.0
21	Champaign	Illinois		1.8
22	Chandler	Arizona	4,131	1.7
23	Stamford	Connecticut	1,998	1.7
24	Jersey City	New Jersey	3,600	1.5
25	Columbia	Missouri	1,454	1.5
26	Arlington	Virginia	2,837	1.4
27	Salt Lake City	Utah	3,600	1.3
28	Glendale	California	2,519	1.3
29	Eugene	Oregon	1,908	1.3
30	Simi Valley	California	1,609	1.3
31	Pembroke Pines	Florida	1,861	1.3
32	Overland Park	Kansas	2,035	1.2
33	Durham	North Carolina	2,004	1.1
34	Irving	Texas	2,157	1.1
35	Providence	Rhode Island	1,867	1.1
36	Syracuse	New York	1,542	1.1
37	Roseville	California	1,227	1.0
38	Carrollton	Texas	1,223	1.0
39	Syosset	New York	1,642	1.0
40	Garland	Texas	2,174	1.0
41	Reno	Nevada	2,128	1.0
42	Gilbert	Arizona	2,042	1.0
43	Worcester	Massachusetts	1,849	1.0
44	Santa Rosa	California	1,613	1.0

== Small-sized cities ==
The following is a list of places in the United States with a population fewer than 100,000 in which at least three percent (five percent in Los Angeles or San Francisco Bay areas) of the total population is Chinese, according to the 2010-2015 American Community Survey, and the 2010 U.S. census for the U.S. territories.

=== American Samoa ===
Rank	City	Percentage
1	Atu'u	6.7

=== California ===

City	County	Chinese-Americans	Percentage
Davis	Yolo	6,448	9.7
Isla Vista	Santa Barbara	2,298	8.7
Florin	Sacramento	2,803	5.5

Greater Los Angeles Area

The majority of the Chinese-American population of more than 400,000 in Los Angeles County lives within the San Gabriel Valley, which is particularly noted for cities that have a large Chinese-American ethnic plurality. The following cities have the highest percentage of Chinese-Americans in Greater Los Angeles.

2010–2015
Rank	City	County	Chinese-Americans	Percentage
1	Arcadia	Los Angeles	26,229	45.6
2	Monterey Park	Los Angeles	27,244	44.6
3	Temple City	Los Angeles	15,741	43.6
4	San Marino	Los Angeles	5,766	43.3
5	San Gabriel	Los Angeles	16,893	42.0
6	East San Gabriel	Los Angeles	6,109	38.2
7	Alhambra	Los Angeles	30,683	36.2
8	Rowland Heights	Los Angeles	18,276	36.2
9	Rosemead	Los Angeles	19,480	35.7
10	Walnut	Los Angeles	10,296	34.4
11	Hacienda Heights	Los Angeles	15,127	27.4
12	Diamond Bar	Los Angeles	15,203	26.9
13	North El Monte	Los Angeles	1,072	26
14	South San Gabriel	Los Angeles	1,941	21.8
15	Mayflower Village	Los Angeles	1,162	21.4
16	East Pasadena	Los Angeles	1,019	16.8
17	Bradbury	Los Angeles	139	16.6
18	Cerritos	Los Angeles	6,999	14.1
19	South Pasadena	Los Angeles	3,432	13.2
20	Chino Hills	San Bernardino	8,917	11.6
21	La Habra Heights	Los Angeles	563	10.4
22	San Pasqual	Los Angeles	185	9.3
23	Rancho Palos Verdes	Los Angeles	3,905	9.2
24	Eastvale	Riverside	5,071	9.0
25	Palos Verdes Estates	Los Angeles	1,203	8.8
26	Artesia	Los Angeles	1,324	7.9
27	Baldwin Park	Los Angeles	5,951	7.8
28	Claremont	Los Angeles	2,649	7.4
29	Rolling Hills	Los Angeles	133	7.3
30	Monrovia	Los Angeles	2,623	7.1
31	Rolling Hills Estates	Los Angeles	567	6.9
32	Sierra Madre	Los Angeles	744	6.7
33	La Palma	Orange	1,023	6.5
34	Oak Park	Ventura	950	6.3
35	San Dimas	Los Angeles	2,015	5.9
36	Duarte	Los Angeles	1,211	5.6
37	Cypress	Orange	2,680	5.5
38	Avocado Heights	Los Angeles	861	5.4
39	Montebello	Los Angeles	3,377	5.3
40	South El Monte	Los Angeles	1,040	5.1
41	Yorba Linda	Orange	3,352	5.0
42	Fountain Valley	Orange	2,819	5.0

San Francisco Bay Area

Traditionally centered in San Francisco and Chinatown Oakland, the suburbanization of the Bay Area's Chinese-American population has resulted in significant concentrations in the southwestern East Bay, eastern Peninsula, and northern Santa Clara County. Chinese enclaves have also formed in many of these cities, in a similar manner to that of Southern California's San Gabriel Valley.

2010–2015
Rank	City	County	Chinese-Americans	Percentage
1	Millbrae	San Mateo	7,198	32.1
2	Cupertino	Santa Clara	16,836	28.0
3	Camino Tassajara	Contra Costa	620	27.6
4	Foster City	San Mateo	7,361	22.7
5	Saratoga	Santa Clara	6,977	22.6
6	Highlands-Baywood Park	San Mateo	934	22.1
7	Hillsborough	San Mateo	2,201	19.6
8	Broadmoor	San Mateo	1,026	19.0
9	Palo Alto	Santa Clara	10,500	15.8
10	Los Altos Hills	Santa Clara	1,270	15.3
11	San Leandro	Alameda	12,844	14.6
12	Albany	Alameda	2,810	14.6
13	Loyola	Santa Clara	506	14.3
14	Stanford	Santa Clara	2,018	14.2
15	Alameda	Alameda	10,790	14.1
16	Milpitas	Santa Clara	9,847	13.8
17	Los Altos	Santa Clara	4,014	13.3
18	Piedmont	Alameda	1,425	12.8
19	Castro Valley	Alameda	7,385	11.9
20	San Ramon	Contra Costa	8,708	11.7
21	Mountain View	Santa Clara	8,793	11.3
22	El Cerrito	Contra Costa	2,755	11.3
23	South San Francisco	San Mateo	7,332	11.1
24	Union City	Alameda	7,797	10.7
25	San Bruno	San Mateo	4,509	10.6
26	Burlingame	San Mateo	2,961	9.9
27	Emeryville	Alameda	1,060	9.8
28	Dublin	Alameda	5,038	9.7
29	Belmont	San Mateo	2,565	9.6
30	San Mateo	San Mateo	9,408	9.3
31	Brisbane	San Mateo	420	9.3
32	San Lorenzo	Alameda	2,279	9.2
33	Moraga	Contra Costa	1,482	8.8
34	Blackhawk	Contra Costa	798	8.6
35	Hercules	Contra Costa	1,982	8.0
36	Fruitdale	Santa Clara	78	8.0
37	Orinda	Contra Costa	1,433	7.7
38	Atherton	San Mateo	537	7.6
39	Pleasanton	Alameda	5,402	7.2
40	Ashland	Alameda	1,710	7.1
41	Pacifica	San Mateo	2,310	6.0
42	Newark	Alameda	2,522	5.7
43	Campbell	Santa Clara	2,227	5.5
44	Colma	San Mateo	82	5.2

=== Delaware ===
Rank	City	Percentage
1	Hockessin	5.0

=== Georgia ===
Rank	City	Percentage
1	Berkeley Lake, Georgia	6.0
2	Duluth, Georgia	5.4
3	Doraville, Georgia	4.0

=== Guam ===
Rank	City	Percentage
1	Tamuning (including Tumon)	5.0
2	Hagåtña	4.0

=== Hawaii ===
Rank	City	County	Chinese-Americans	Percentage
1	East Honolulu	Honolulu	5,190	10.8
2	Kalaheo	Kauaʻi	297	6.8
3	Waimea	Kauaʻi	92	5.4
4	Volcano	Hawaii	128	5.3
5	Aiea	Honolulu	428	4.6
6	Halawa	Honolulu	656	4.4
7	Laie	Honolulu	225	4.0
8	Heʻeia	Honolulu	173	3.9
9	Ko Olina	Honolulu	71	3.8
10	Pearl City	Honolulu	1,700	3.6
11	Kaneohe	Honolulu	1,222	3.6
12	Waikele	Honolulu	282	3.6
13	Punaluu	Honolulu	38	3.6
14	Wailuā Homesteads	Kauaʻi	197	3.5
15	Discovery Harbour	Hawaii	38	3.4
16	Maunawili	Honolulu	64	3.0
17	Wailuku	Maui	428	2.7
18	Kailua	Honolulu	966	2.5
19	Waimalu	Honolulu	386	2.9

=== Indiana ===
Rank	City	Percentage
1	West Lafayette	11.1
2	Carmel	3.5

=== Massachusetts ===
Rank	City	Percentage
1	Quincy	15.6
2	Lexington	15.4

=== New Jersey ===
Rank	City	Percentage
1	Kingston	16.0
2	Holmdel Township	12.1
3	West Windsor Township	11.6
4	Montgomery Township	11.4
5	Plainsboro Township	9.7
6	Englewood Cliffs	9.7
7	Fort Lee	8.7
8	Harrison	8.4
9	Bernards Township	8.0
10	East Brunswick	7.1
11	Warren Township	7.1
12	Livingston	6.9
13	Montville	6.9
14	Bridgewater Township	6.7
15	Alpine	6.5
16	Marlboro Township	6.4
17	New Providence	6.2
18	Edison	6.1
19	Parsippany-Troy Hills	6.1
20	Cranbury Township	6.0
21	Piscataway Township	5.8
22	Kendall Park	5.5
23	East Hanover	5.4
24	South Brunswick Township	4.9
25	Closter	4.6
26	Princeton Township	4.5
27	Highland Park	4.3
28	Berkeley Heights	4.1
29	Princeton Junction	4.1
30	Dayton	3.9
31	Millburn	3.9
32	Cresskill	3.9
33	Paramus	3.1
34	Edgewater	3.0

=== Northern Mariana Islands ===
Rank	City	Percentage
1	Tinian	7.6
2	Saipan	7.1

Within Saipan, villages with significant Chinese populations include Garapan (19.7% Chinese), Chalan Piao (18.1% Chinese), Chalan Kanoa IV (15.1% Chinese), and San Antonio (19.8% Chinese).

=== Ohio ===
Rank	City	Percentage
1	Glenwillow	7.0
2	Solon	5.3
3	Oxford	4.7
4	Athens	4.2
5	Dublin	3.9

=== Texas ===
Rank	City	Percentage
1	Sugar Land	12.8
2	New Territory	5.0
3	Bellaire	8.7
4	Richardson	4.0
5	Jollyville	3.2

=== Washington ===
The overwhelming majority of these cities are in King County, while three others (Edmonds, Lynnwood, and Mill Creek) are in Snohomish County. Pullman is in Whitman County.

Rank	City	Percentage
1	Newcastle	11.5
2	Redmond	8.6
3	Sammamish	7.9
4	Mercer Island	7.4
5	Clyde Hill	7.4
6	Pullman	5.5
7	West Lake	4.0
8	Bryn Mawr-Skyway	3.7
9	Shoreline	3.4

== See also ==
- Chinatown
- List of U.S. cities with Asian American majority populations
- List of U.S. cities with large Japanese-American populations
- List of U.S. cities with significant Korean-American populations
- List of U.S. cities with large Vietnamese-American populations
- Lists of U.S. cities with large ethnic identity populations
