= List of U.S. cities with large Asian populations =

The following list of ethnic groups is a partial list of United States cities and towns in which a majority (over 50%) of the population is Asian American or Asian, according to the United States Census Bureau. This list does not include cities in which, according to the U.S. Census Bureau, merely a plurality (as opposed to a majority) of the residents are Asian American. The list below is organized by state or territory and, within each state or territory, by population size. The percentage of each city's population that is Asian American is listed in parentheses next to the city's name.

There are 51 communities in four states and two territories with Asian-American majority populations.

== Cities with the highest percentage of Asian-Americans ==
Top Ten cities with 100,000 or more total population and the highest percentages of Asian-Americans, alone or with other races
City	Total Population (2010)	Asian-American, alone or with other races		Asian-American, alone		Mixed-race Asian-American	
City	Total Population (2010)	Rank	Percentage of total population	Rank	Percentage of total population	Rank	Percentage of total population
Honolulu, HI	337,256	1	68.2	2	54.8	1	13.4
Daly City, CA	101,123	2	58.4	1	55.6	21	2.8
Fremont, CA	214,089	3	54.5	3	50.6	5	3.9
Sunnyvale, CA	140,081	4	43.7	4	40.9	19	2.8
Irvine, CA	212,375	5	43.3	5	39.2	4	4.1
Santa Clara, CA	116,468	6	40.8	6	37.7	11	3.2
Garden Grove, CA	170,883	7	38.6	7	37.1	75	1.4
Torrance, CA	145,438	8	38.2	8	34.5	6	3.6
San Francisco, CA	805,235	9	35.8	9	33.3	25	2.6
San Jose, CA	945,942	10	34.5	10	32.0	27	2.5

Ten cities with 100,000 or more total population and the highest percentage "Asian in combination" (mixed with other races)
City	Total population (2010)	Asian-American, alone or mixed with other races		Asian-American, alone		Mixed-race Asian-American	
City	Total population (2010)	Rank	Percent of total population	Rank	Percent of total population	Rank	Percent of total population
Honolulu, HI	337,256	1	68.2	2	54.8	1	13.4
Elk Grove, CA	153,015	11	30.6	12	26.3	2	4.3
Fairfield, CA	105,321	26	19.0	32	14.9	3	4.1
Irvine, CA	212,375	5	43.3	5	39.2	4	4.1
Fremont, CA	214,089	3	54.5	3	50.6	5	3.9
Torrance, CA	145,438	8	38.2	8	34.5	6	3.6
Berkeley, CA	112,580	21	22.8	22	19.3	7	3.6
Vallejo, CA	115,942	13	28.3	15	24.9	8	3.3
Enterprise, NV	108,481	20	24.5	20	21.2	9	3.3
Hayward, CA	144,186	17	25.2	18	22.0	10	3.2

== Cities with the highest number of Asian-Americans ==
Ten cities with 100,000 or more total population and the highest number of Asian-Americans
City	Total population (2010)	Asian-American, alone or mixed with other races		Asian-American, alone		Mixed-race Asian-American	
City	Total population (2010)	Rank	Number	Rank	Number	Rank	Number
New York, NY	8,175,133	1	1,134,919	1	1,038,388	1	96,531
Los Angeles, CA	3,792,621	2	483,585	2	426,959	2	56,626
San Jose, CA	945,942	3	326,627	3	303,138	5	23,489
San Francisco, CA	805,235	4	288,529	4	267,915	6	20,614
San Diego, CA	1,307,402	5	241,293	5	207,944	4	33,349
Honolulu, HI	337,256	6	230,071	6	184,950	3	45,121
Chicago, IL	2,695,598	7	166,770	7	147,164	7	19,606
Houston, TX	2,099,451	8	139,960	8	126,378	9	13,582
Fremont, CA	214,089	9	116,755	9	108,332	22	8,423
Philadelphia, PA	1,526,006	10	106,720	10	96,405	14	10,315

== Cities and census-designated places with Asian alone, Non-Hispanic majority populations ==
Following are cities with Asian alone, non-Hispanic majority populations

=== California ===
Population over 100,000

- Daly City (2020, 56.93%)
- Fremont (2020, 63.72%)
- Sunnyvale (2020, 49.78%)

Population between 25,000 and 99,999

- Alhambra (2020, 51.35%)
- Arcadia (2020, 64.59%)
- Cerritos (2020, 62.14%)
- Cupertino (2020, 70.14%)
- Diamond Bar (2020, 59.24%)
- Dublin (2020, 53.53%)★
- Foster City (2020, 53.5%)★
- Hercules (50.6%)
- Milpitas (2020, 71.33%)
- Monterey Park (2020, 66.05%)
- Rosemead (2020, 64.00%)
- Rowland Heights (2020, 61.34%)
- San Gabriel (2020, 63.35%)
- San Ramon (2020, 50.89%)★
- Saratoga (2020, 54.20%)★
- Temple City (2020, 63.54%)
- Union City (2020, 57.41%)
- Walnut (2020, 67.05%)
- Westminster (2020, 51.16%)★

Population less than 25,000

- Camino Tassajara CDP (2020, 57.46%)
- East San Gabriel CDP (2020, 54.82%)★
- La Palma (2020, 50.29%)★
- Midway City (2020, 52.09%)★
- Millbrae (2020, 52.7%)★
- Mountain House (57.6%)
- Norris Canyon CDP (69.2%)
- Post Mountain CDP (2020, 55.21%)★
- San Marino (2020, 60.58%)
- South San Gabriel CDP (2020, 57.35%)★

★ Asian-American majority as of the 2020 Census
★ New jurisdiction first appearing in the 2020 Census

=== Guam ===
Population less than 25,000

- Tamuning (including Tumon) (50.0%)

=== Hawaii ===
Population over 100,000

- Honolulu (2020, 52.34%)

Population between 25,000 and 99,999

- Waipahu (67.1%)
- Pearl City (53.2%)

Population less than 25,000

- Kaumakani (77.3%)
- 'Ewa Villages (70.4%)
- Whitmore Village (65.9%)
- Puhi (65.7%)
- 'Ele`ele (61.8%)
- Hamamaulu (61.5%)
- Lāna`i City (58.1%)
- Village Park (57.9%)
- 'Aiea (57.7%)
- Kea`au (57.7%)
- Waipio (54.7%)
- Pepe`ekeo (54.7%)
- Kahului (53.6%)
- Pāhoa (52.4%)
- Waialua (51.9%)
- Hālawa (51.6%)
- 'Ewa Gentry (51.4%)

=== New Jersey ===
Population over 100,000

- Edison (2020, 53.62%)★

Population between 25,000 and 99,000

- West Windsor (54.7%)

Population less than 25,000

- Belle Mead CDP (2020, 57.34%)★
- Dayton CDP (2020, 53.99%)★
- Forsgate CDP (2020 67.07%)★
- Harlingen CDP (2020, 50.23%)★
- Iselin CDP (2020, 57.42%)★
- Monmouth Junction CDP (2020, 57.45%)★
- Monroe Manor CDP (2020, 73.19%)★
- Palisades Park (2020, 58.64%)
- Plainsboro (57.8%)
- Plainsboro Center CDP (2020, 51.49%)★
- Princeton Meadows CDP (2020, 58.53%)★
- Rutgers University-Busch Campus CDP (2020, 54.12%)★
- Ten Mile Run CDP (2020, 58.00%)★

★ Asian-American majority as of the 2020 Census
★ New jurisdiction first appearing in the 2020 Census

=== New York ===
Population less than 25,000

- Herricks CDP
- Lake Success
- Searingtown CDP

=== Northern Mariana Islands ===
Population between 25,000 and 100,000

- Saipan (50.9%)
  - Garapan, Saipan (81.2%)
  - China Town, Saipan (77.2%)
  - Chalan Piao, Saipan (71.9%)
  - Chalan Kanoa I, Saipan (66.9%)

=== Pennsylvania ===
Population less than 25,000

- Millbourne (63.9%)

=== Virginia ===
Population less than 25,000

- Loudoun Valley Estates CDP (61.0%)
- Navy CDP (2020, 50.13%)★
- Sully Square CDP (2020, 61.09%)★

★ New jurisdiction first appearing in the 2020 Census

== See also ==
- Lists of United States cities with large ethnic minority populations
  - List of U.S. cities with large Cambodian-American populations
  - List of U.S. cities with significant Chinese-American populations
  - List of U.S. cities with large Filipino-American populations
  - List of U.S. cities with large Japanese-American populations
  - List of U.S. cities with significant Korean-American populations
  - List of U.S. cities with large Vietnamese-American populations
