= Little Poland =

Little Poland may refer to:

== Poland ==
- Lesser Poland (Polish: Małopolska), a historical region of southern Poland
- Lesser Poland Voivodeship (Polish: województwo małopolskie), a present-day administrative region in southern Poland

== United States ==
- Greenpoint, Brooklyn, New York City
- Port Richmond, Philadelphia
- Chicago Polonia, or the various Polish neighborhoods and communities in Chicago
- Little Poland, Baltimore, an informal name for Southeast Baltimore's Polish community
- Little Poland, New Britain, Connecticut, the neighborhood around Broad Street

== See also ==
- List of U.S. cities with large Polish-American populations
