= Lists of United States cities with large ethnic minority populations =

The following are links to lists of United States cities with large ethnic minority populations. (There are many cities in the US with no ethnic majority.)

== Overall ==
- List of largest U.S. municipalities by race/ethnicity in 2020 (80,000+)

== Asian Americans ==
- List of U.S. communities with Asian American majority populations
  - List of U.S. cities with large Cambodian-American populations
  - List of U.S. cities with significant Chinese American populations
  - List of U.S. cities with large Filipino American populations
  - List of U.S. cities with large Japanese American populations
  - List of U.S. cities with significant Korean American populations
  - List of U.S. cities with large Indian American populations
  - List of U.S. cities with large Sikh American populations
  - List of U.S. cities with large Vietnamese American populations

== Black Americans ==
- List of U.S. cities with large African American populations
- List of U.S. cities with African American majority populations
  - List of U.S. cities with large Nigerian American populations

== West Indian Americans ==
- List of West Indian communities in the United States

== European Americans ==
- List of U.S. cities with large Armenian American populations
- List of U.S. cities with large Austrian American populations
- List of U.S. cities with large Czech American populations
- List of U.S. cities with large Danish American populations
- List of U.S. cities with large English American populations
- List of U.S. cities with large French American populations
- List of U.S. cities with large German American populations
- List of U.S. cities with large Greek American populations
- List of U.S. cities with large Hungarian American populations
- List of U.S. cities with large Irish American populations
- List of U.S. cities with large Italian American populations
- List of U.S. cities with large Norwegian American populations
- List of U.S. cities with large Polish American populations
- List of U.S. cities with large Portuguese American populations
- List of U.S. cities with large Russian American populations
- List of U.S. cities with large Turkish American populations
- List of U.S. cities with large Swiss American populations

== Latino Americans ==
- List of U.S. cities with large Latino American populations
  - List of U.S. cities with large Brazilian American populations
  - List of U.S. cities with large Cuban American populations
  - List of U.S. cities with large Dominican American populations
  - List of U.S. cities with large Puerto Rican American populations
  - List of U.S. cities with large Mexican American populations
  - List of U.S. cities with large Guatemalan American populations
  - List of U.S. cities with large Salvadorian American populations
  - List of U.S. cities with large Honduran American populations

== Middle Eastern Americans ==
- List of U.S. cities with large Arab American populations
- List of U.S. cities with large American Jewish populations

== Native Americans ==
- List of U.S. communities with Native American majority populations
