= Hungarian settlements in North America =

The Hungarian settlements in North America are those settlements, which were founded by Hungarian settlers, immigrants. Some of them still exist, sometimes their names were changed. The first greater Hungarian immigration wave reached North America in the 19th century, the first settlements were established at that time.

== Settlements with Hungarian name ==
- Esterhazy, Saskatchewan – The town was named after Count Paul Oscar Esterhazy (Eszterházy). He was a Hungarian nobleman, who settled down Hungarians in the late 19th century.
- Otthon, Saskatchewan – The name of the settlement means Home.
- New Buda, Iowa – This unincorporated town is now in New Buda Township, Decatur County, Iowa, which wears its name. It was founded by László Újházy. He wanted to collect the Hungarian immigrants of 1848–1849 to one place, where they could build a New Hungary.
- Buda, Illinois, a village, named after the old Hungarian capital
- Buda, Nebraska, an unincorporated community
- Buda, Texas, a city, it isn't known whether the name of the city is a corruption of the Spanish word "viuda" or "widow", or named after the Hungarian capital
- Budapest, Georgia – Named after the capital of Hungary; actually had a Hungarian population, just like the nearby village "Tokaj", which is also named after a Hungarian settlement.
- Budapest, Missouri – Also named after the capital of Hungary.
- Balaton, Minnesota – It was named after the greatest Hungarian lake Balaton.
- Kossuthville, Florida – It was named after Louis Kossuth, and it has Hungarian population.
- Kossuth, Wisconsin - It was named after Louis Kossuth.
- Kossuth County, Iowa
- Kossuth, Mississippi, a village
- Kossuth, Ohio, an unincorporated place in Auglaize County
- Kossuth Colony Historic District, an area in Dayton, Ohio
- Tolna, North Dakota, a town.

== Settlements, whose name was changed ==
- Albany, Louisiana – Albany was founded as Árpádhon ('Árpád's Home') in 1896.
- Kipling, Saskatchewan – This was one of the largest Hungarian settlements in Canada. The original name of the Hungarian district was Békevár ('Peaceburgh').
- Sauk City, Wisconsin – It was founded by Agoston Haraszthy. The original name was Széptáj ('Beautiful place').
- Corning, Ohio – The original name was Kongó ('Tinkler', 'Pealer'), it was established in 1812.
- Malaga, California - originally it was Tokay

== Settlements, where there is a significant Hungarian population ==
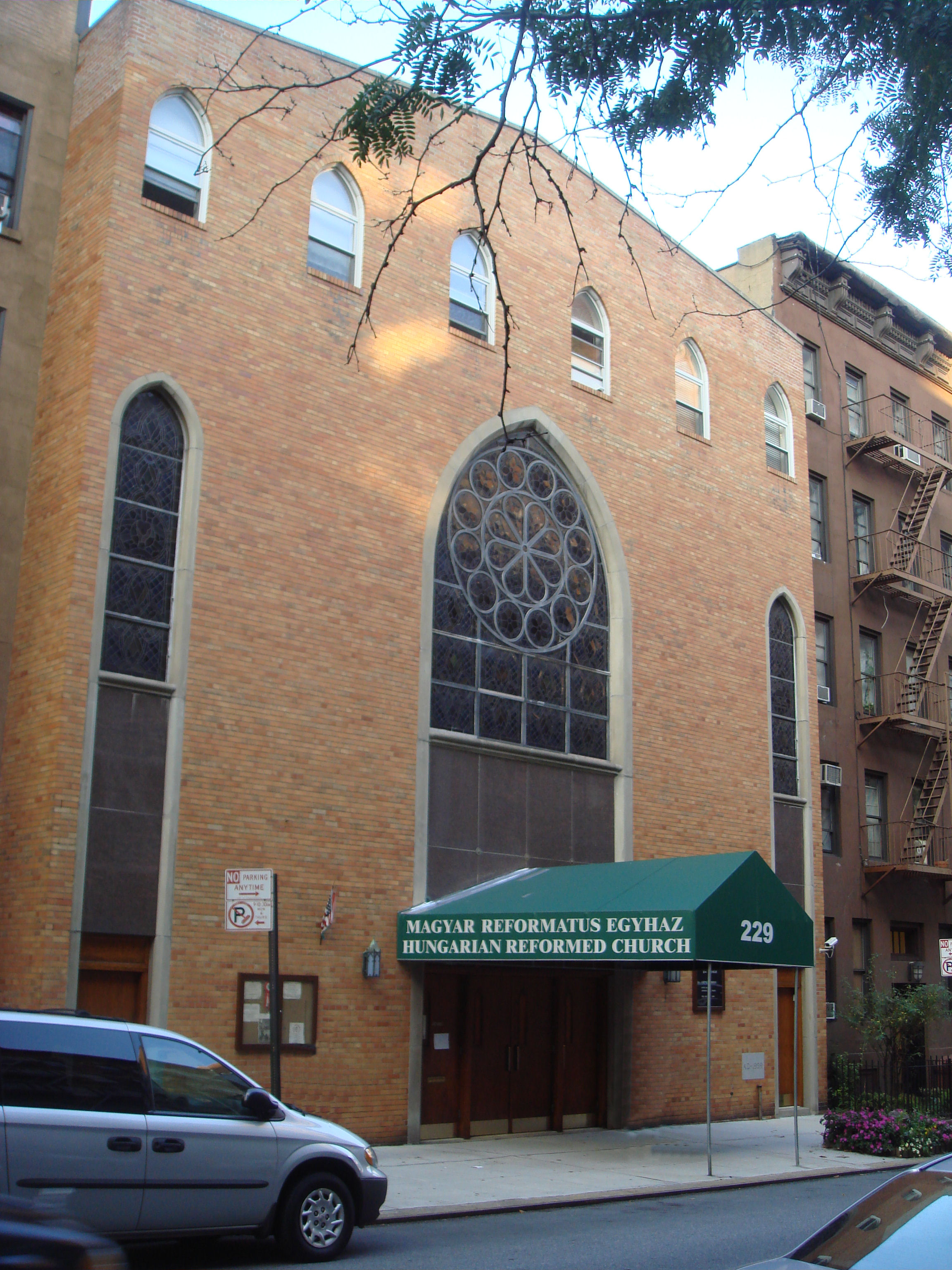
Hungarian Reformed Church, New York

- Cleveland – Cleveland once was known as the second greatest Hungarian city outside Budapest. Cleveland and the neighboring area has about 130,000 Hungarian population.
- Fairport Harbor, Ohio – This village contains the highest percentage of Hungarian population, 11.5%. The current mayor, the fire department leader and the police chief all have Hungarian roots.
- Yorkville, Manhattan – East 79th Street was the Hungarian Boulevard. On East 82nd Street stands the St. Stephen Catholic church and farther east on the same street the Hungarian Reformed Church.
- New Brunswick, New Jersey – The Fifth Ward-Somerset Street has been the center of Hungarian-American life since the early part of the 20th century where there are many Hungarian institutions, including Magyar Bank, churches, kindergartens, schools, associations or folk dance ensembles and the annual Hungarian Festival.
- Edmonton, Alberta – In 2006 there lived 12 110 Hungarians.
- South Bend, Indiana – 3.3% of the population (3 559 persons) is Hungarian.
- Toledo, Ohio – Since 1892 it has a large Hungarian community, in 2006 lived 6,093 Hungarians there.
- Prince Rupert and Terrace, British Columbia – settlements which became home to refugees from the Sopron Faculty of Forestry in 1956 and since

== See also ==
- List of U.S. cities with large Hungarian American populations
