= Royal Kunia, Hawaii =

Census-designated place in Hawaii, United States

Royal Kunia
- Census-designated place
- Location in Honolulu County and the state of Hawaii
- Coordinates: 21°24′18″N 158°1′54″W
- Country: United States
- State: Hawaii
- County: Honolulu

Area
  - Total: 3.01 sq mi (7.80 km^{2})
  - Land: 3.01 sq mi (7.80 km^{2})
  - Water: 0 sq mi (0.00 km^{2})
- Elevation: 440 ft (130 m)

Population (2020)
  - Total: 14,896
  - Density: 4,947.6/sq mi (1,910.28/km^{2})
- Time zone: UTC-10 (Hawaii-Aleutian)
- ZIP code: 96797
- Area code: 808
- FIPS code: 15-68815

Royal Kunia is a census-designated place (CDP) on the island of Oʻahu in the City & County of Honolulu, Hawaiʻi, United States. As of the 2020 census, the population of the CDP was 14,896. The area was recorded as the Village Park CDP in prior censuses.

== Geography ==
Royal Kunia is located just north of Waipahu at 21°24′18″N 158°1′54″W (21.4052, -158.0318). It is bounded on the south by Interstate H-1 and on the west by Kunia Road (State Route 750).

According to the United States Census Bureau, the CDP has a total area of 3.0 square miles (7.8 km^{2}), all of it land.

== Demographics ==
Historical population
Census	Pop.	Note	%±
2020	14,896		—
U.S. Decennial Census

=== 2020 census ===
As of the 2020 census, Royal Kunia had a population of 14,896. The median age was 40.1 years. 20.6% of residents were under the age of 18 and 16.7% of residents were 65 years of age or older. For every 100 females there were 98.6 males, and for every 100 females age 18 and over there were 96.1 males age 18 and over.

98.2% of residents lived in urban areas, while 1.8% lived in rural areas.

There were 4,112 households in Royal Kunia, of which 38.9% had children under the age of 18 living in them. Of all households, 65.1% were married-couple households, 12.6% were households with a male householder and no spouse or partner present, and 16.3% were households with a female householder and no spouse or partner present. About 10.3% of all households were made up of individuals and 3.5% had someone living alone who was 65 years of age or older.

There were 4,243 housing units, of which 3.1% were vacant. The homeowner vacancy rate was 0.5% and the rental vacancy rate was 6.8%.

Racial composition as of the 2020 census
Race	Number	Percent
White	1,134	7.6%
Black or African American	229	1.5%
American Indian and Alaska Native	17	0.1%
Asian	8,885	59.6%
Native Hawaiian and Other Pacific Islander	1,305	8.8%
Some other race	175	1.2%
Two or more races	3,151	21.2%
Hispanic or Latino (of any race)	1,105	7.4%

=== 2010 census ===
As of the census of 2010, there were 14,525 people, 4,014 households, and 3,524 families residing in the CDP. The racial makeup of the CDP was 12.5% White, 2.5% African American, 0% Native American, 51.7% Asian, 11.3% Pacific Islander, 0.7% from other races, and 21.7% from two or more races. Hispanic or Latino of any race were 9.5% of the population.

=== Income and poverty ===
The median income for a household in the CDP was $103,649, and the median income for a family was $91,230. The per capita income for the CDP was $26,900. About 4.8% of families and 2.6% of the population were below the poverty line, including 8% of those under age 18 and 4.3% of those age 65 or over.

== Education ==
Hawaii Department of Education operates public schools. Kale'iopu'u Elementary School is in Royal Kunia CDP.
