= List of U.S. cities with large Irish-American populations =

U.S. cities with large Irish American populations. The city with the highest Irish population is Boston, Massachusetts.

== Large cities with the highest percentage of Irish ancestry ==
- Boston, Massachusetts 22.8%
- Philadelphia, Pennsylvania 14.2%
- Louisville, Kentucky 13.2%
- Portland, Oregon 11.9%
- Seattle, Washington 11.65%
- Buffalo, New York 11.23%
- Pittsburgh, Pennsylvania 10.7%
- Nashville, Tennessee 9.8%
- Kansas City, Missouri 9.66%
- Raleigh, North Carolina 9.5%
- Cleveland, Ohio 9.43%
- Saint Paul, Minnesota - 9.4%
- Baltimore, Maryland 9.14%
- Cincinnati, Ohio 9.05%
- Austin, Texas 8.5%
- Charlotte, North Carolina 8.4%
- Chicago, Illinois 8%
- San Francisco 7.5%
- Memphis, Tennessee 7%
- New Orleans, Louisiana 6.8%

== See also ==
- Lists of U.S. cities with large ethnic minority populations
- Irish in Omaha, Nebraska
