= Chinatowns in Queens =

Neighborhoods in New York City

Coordinates: 40.7422°N 73.8786°W

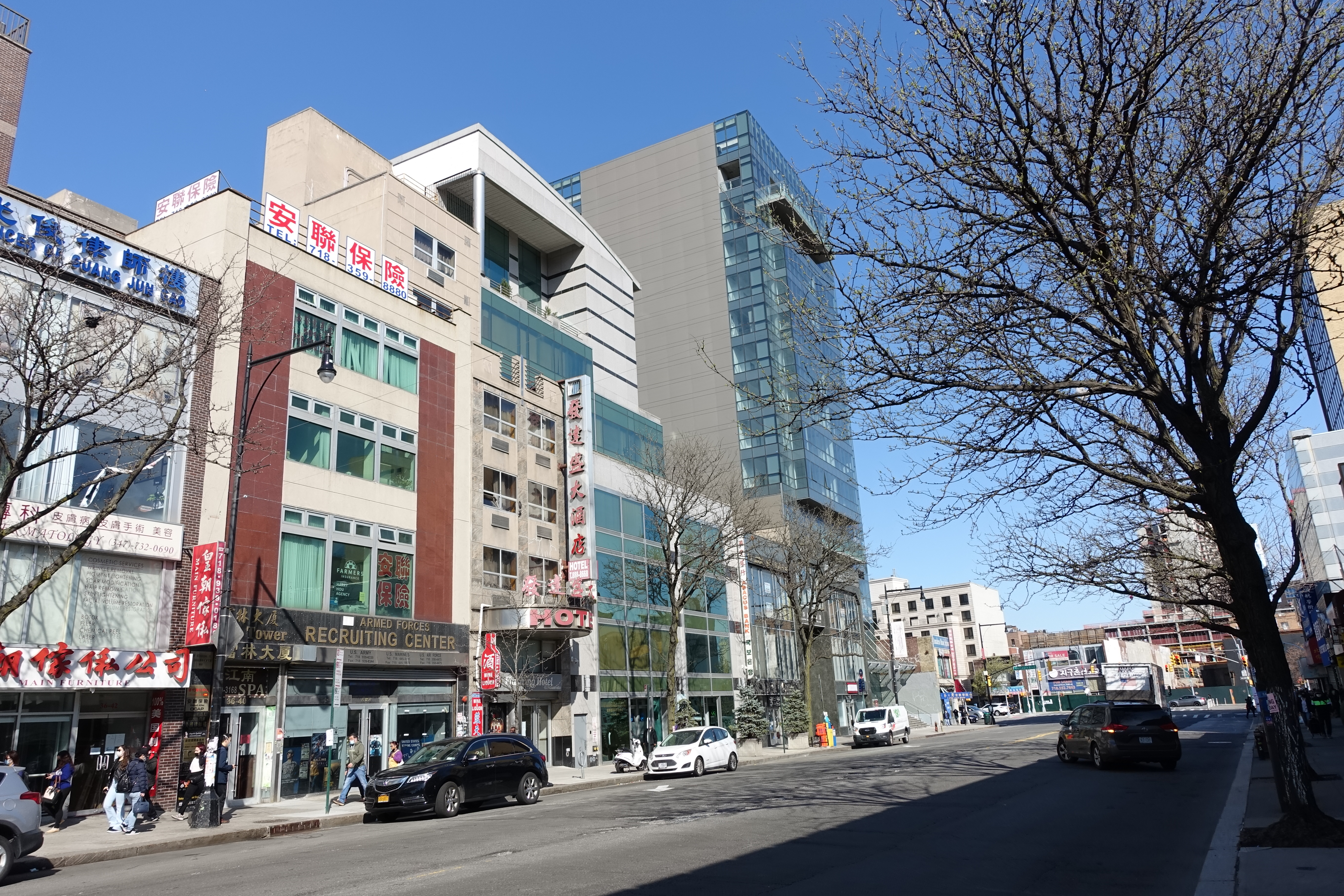
- Intersection of Main Street and Northern Blvd in Flushing Chinatown
- Traditional Chinese: 皇后區唐人街
- Simplified Chinese: 皇后区唐人街
- Hanyu Pinyin: Huánghòu-qū Tángrén-jiē
- Jyutping: Wong4 Hau6 Keoi1 Tong4 Jan4 Gaai1
Transcriptions
Standard Mandarin
- Hanyu Pinyin: Huánghòu-qū Tángrén-jiē
Hakka
- Romanization: fongˇ heu kiˊ tongˇ nginˇ gieˊ
- Pha̍k-fa-sṳ: Vòng-hiu-khî Thòng-nyìn-kâi
Yue: Cantonese
- Jyutping: Wong4 Hau6 Keoi1 Tong4 Jan4 Gaai1
Southern Min
- Hokkien POJ: Hông-hiō-khu Tn̂g-lâng-koe
- Tâi-lô: Hông-hiō-khu Tn̂g-lâng-kue

There are multiple Chinatowns in the borough of Queens in New York City. The original Queens Chinatown emerged in Flushing, initially as a satellite of the original Manhattan Chinatown, before evolving its own identity, surpassing in scale the original Manhattan Chinatown, and subsequently, in turn, spawning its own satellite Chinatowns in Elmhurst, Corona, and eastern Queens. As of 2023, illegal Chinese immigration to New York has accelerated, and its Flushing neighborhood has become the present-day global epicenter receiving Chinese immigration as well as the international control center directing such migration. As of 2024, a significant new wave of Chinese Muslims are fleeing religious persecution in northwestern China’s Xinjiang Province and seeking religious freedom in New York, and concentrating in Queens.

== Context ==
The New York metropolitan area is home to the largest ethnic Chinese population outside Asia, comprising an estimated 893,697 uniracial individuals as of 2017, including at least 12 Chinatowns - six (or nine, including the emerging Chinatowns in Corona and Whitestone, Queens, and East Harlem, Manhattan) in New York City proper, and one each in Nassau County, Long Island; Cherry Hill, Edison, New Jersey; and Parsippany-Troy Hills, New Jersey, not to mention fledgling ethnic Chinese enclaves emerging throughout the New York City metropolitan area. Chinese Americans, as a whole, have had a significant tenure in New York City. The first Chinese immigrants came to Lower Manhattan around 1870, looking for the "golden" opportunities America had to offer. By 1880, the enclave around Five Points was estimated to have from 200 to as many as 1,100 members.

However, the Chinese Exclusion Act, which went into effect in 1882, caused an abrupt decline in the number of Chinese who immigrated to New York and the rest of the United States. Later, in 1943, the Chinese were given a small quota, and the community's population gradually increased until 1968, when the quota was lifted and the Chinese American population skyrocketed. In the past few years, the Cantonese dialect that has dominated the Chinatowns for decades is being rapidly swept aside by Mandarin Chinese, the national language of China and the lingua franca of most of the latest Chinese immigrants.

=== Citywide demographics ===
As the city proper with the largest ethnic Chinese population outside of Asia by a wide margin, estimated at 628,763 as of 2017, and as the primary destination for new Chinese immigrants, New York City is subdivided into official municipal boroughs, which themselves are home to significant Chinese populations, with Brooklyn and Queens, adjacently located on Long Island, leading the fastest growth. The boroughs of Queens and Brooklyn encompass the largest Chinese populations, respectively, of all municipalities in the United States.

Chinese Americans in New York City
borough	Chinese Americans residents	
borough	percent	number
Queens	10.2	265,135
Brooklyn	7.9	222,059
Manhattan	6.6	119,208
Staten Island	2.9	27,707
The Bronx	0.5	7,859
New York City		573,388

== Flushing Chinatown ==
Flushing Chinatown Chinese: 法拉盛
- Neighborhood of Queens
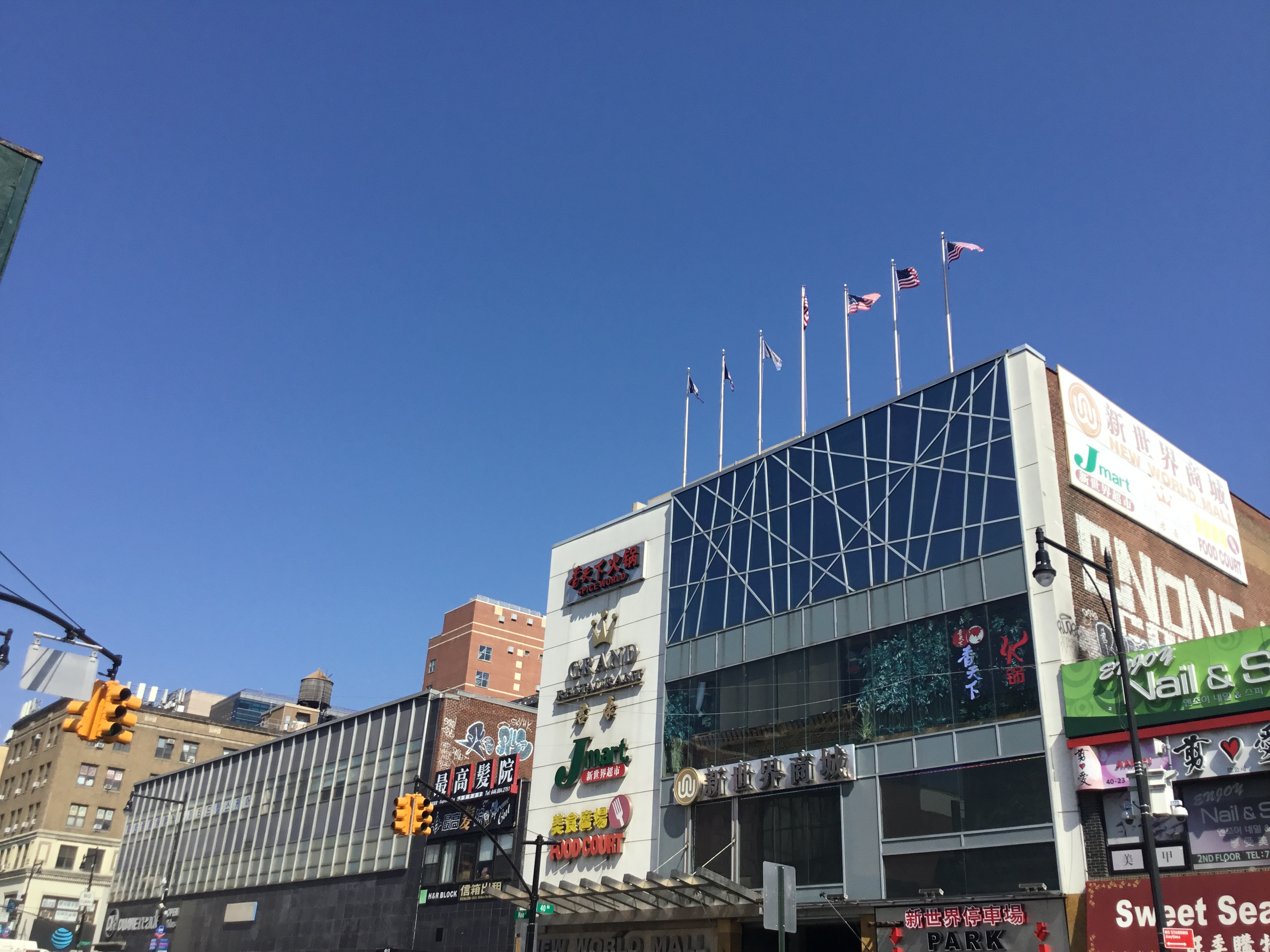
- Main Street in Flushing Chinatown
- Interactive map of Flushing Chinatown
- Country: United States
- State: New York
- City: New York City
- Borough: Queens
- Region: Long Island
- Area codes: 718, 347, 929, and 917

Chinatown, Flushing
- Traditional Chinese: 法拉盛華埠
- Simplified Chinese: 法拉盛华埠
Transcriptions
Standard Mandarin
- Hanyu Pinyin: Fǎlāshèng Huá Bù
- Gwoyeu Romatzyh: Faalashenq Hwabuh
- Wade–Giles: Fa^{3}la^{1}sheng^{4} Hua^{2} Pu^{4}
- Tongyong Pinyin: Fǎlāshèng Húa Bú
- IPA: [fàláʂə̂ŋ xwǎ pʰû]
Hakka
- Pha̍k-fa-sṳ: Fa̍p-lâ-sin Fà-phu
Yue: Cantonese
- Jyutping: Faat3laa1sing4 Waa4 fau6
- IPA: [fāːtláːsȉŋ wȁːpòu]
Southern Min
- Hokkien POJ: Hoat-la-sēng Hôa-po͘
- Tâi-lô: Huat-la-sīng Huâ-poo

Flushing Chinatown (法拉盛華埠), or Mandarin Town Flushing (國語埠法拉盛) in Flushing, is one of the largest and fastest-growing ethnic Chinese enclaves outside Asia, as well as within New York City itself. Flushing Chinatown is in Main Street and the area to its west, particularly along Roosevelt Avenue, has become the primary nexus of Flushing Chinatown. However, Chinatown continues to expand southeastward along Kissena Boulevard and northward beyond Northern Boulevard. The Flushing–Main Street station is the busiest New York City Subway station outside Manhattan. The Flushing Chinatown houses over 30,000 individuals born in China alone, the largest Chinatown by this metric outside Asia, the largest and fastest-growing Chinatown in the world, and one of the world's busiest pedestrian intersections. Flushing is undergoing rapid gentrification by Chinese transnational entities.

=== History ===
==== Before Chinatown ====
In 1645, Flushing was established by Dutch settlers on the eastern bank of Flushing Creek under charter of the Dutch West India Company and was part of the New Netherland colony. The settlement was named after the city of Vlissingen, in the southwestern Netherlands, the main port of the company; Flushing is the historic anglicization of the Dutch name of that town.

In 1664, the English took control of New Amsterdam, ending Dutch control of the colony, and renamed it the Province of New York. When Queens County was established in 1683, the "Town of Flushing" was one of the original five towns which comprised the county. Many historical references to Flushing are to this town, bounded from Newtown on the west by Flushing Creek (now often called the Flushing River), from Jamaica on the south by the "hills"—that is, the terminal moraine left by the last glacier, and from Hempstead on the east by what later became the Nassau County line. The town was dissolved in 1898 when Queens became a borough of New York City, and the term "Flushing" today usually refers to a much smaller area, including the former Village of Flushing and the areas immediately to the east and south. It was later settled by multiple ethnicities, including people of European, Hispanic, South-West Asian, African, and eventually East Asian ancestry.

==== Emergence as Little Taipei / Little Taiwan ====
In the 1970s, a Chinese community established a foothold in Flushing, whose demographic constituency had been predominantly white, interspersed with a small Japanese community. This wave of immigrants from Taiwan were the first to arrive and developed Flushing's Chinatown. It was known as Little Taipei (小台北) or Little Taiwan (小台灣). Many who arrived were the descendants of former soldiers and political supporters of Chiang Kai-shek and the Chinese Nationalist Party, which had lost the war against the Chinese Communist Party, and established themselves in Taiwan. Along with immigrants from Taiwan at this time, a large South Korean population has also called Flushing home.

Before the 1970s, Cantonese immigrants had vastly dominated Chinese immigration to New York City; however, during the 1970s, the Taiwanese immigrants were the first wave of Chinese immigrants who spoke Mandarin rather than Cantonese to arrive in New York City. Due to the dominance of Cantonese-speaking immigrants, who were largely working-class in Manhattan's Chinatown (Chinese: 紐約華埠; Jyutping: Nau2 Joek3 Waa4 Fau6), as well as the language barrier and poor housing conditions there, Taiwanese immigrants, who were more likely to have attained higher educational standards and socioeconomic status, could not relate to Manhattan's Chinatown, and chose to settle in Flushing instead. As the Taiwanese population grew, a Flushing Chinatown was created with a higher standard of living and better housing conditions.

==== Mandarin Town, Flushing ====
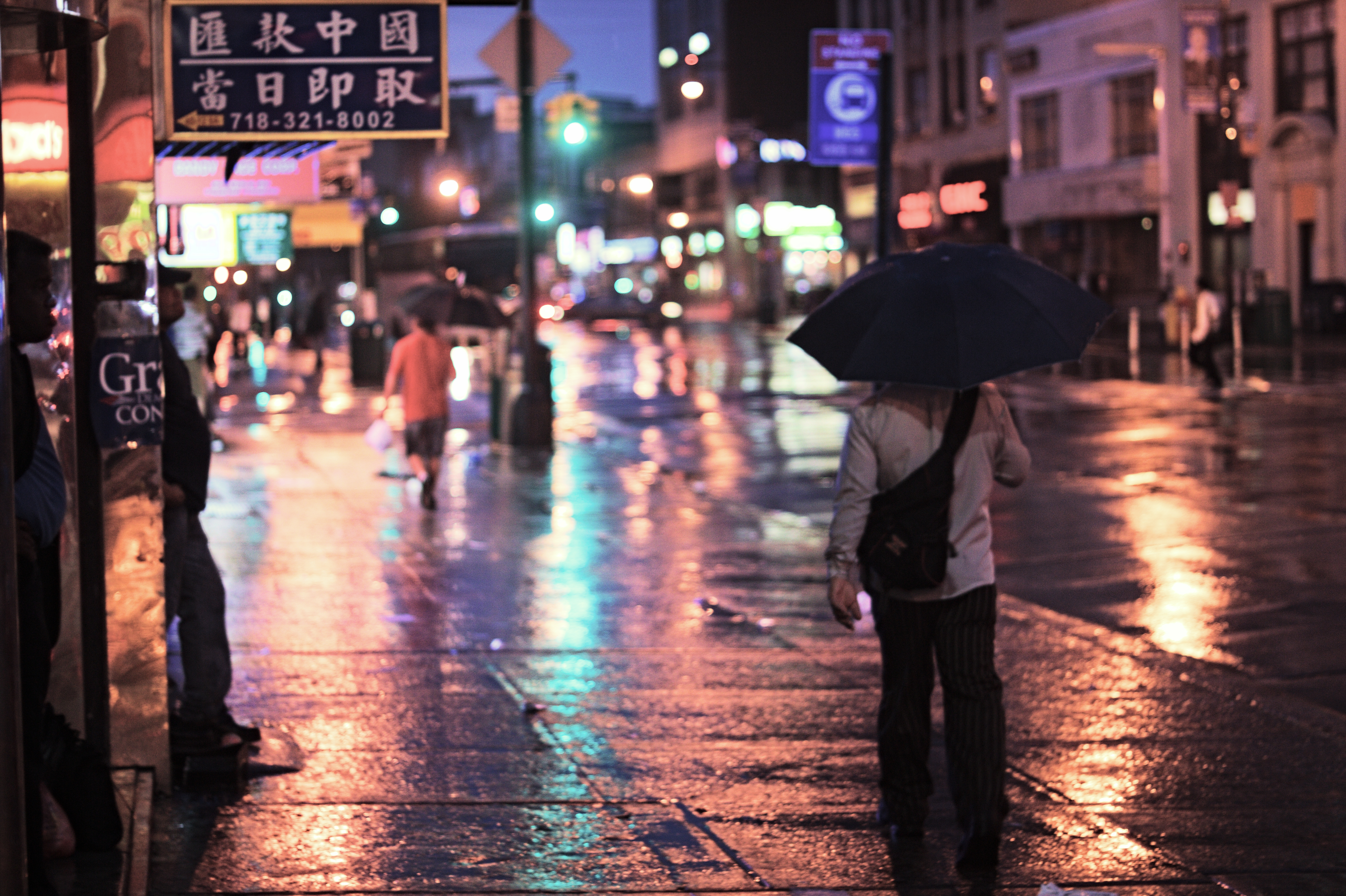
The intersection of Main St and Roosevelt Ave after an early morning rainstorm.

Over the years, many new non-Cantonese ethnic Chinese immigrants from different regions and provinces of China started to arrive in New York City and settled in Flushing through word of mouth. This led to the creation of a more Mandarin-speaking Chinatown or Mandarin Town that gradually replaced Little Taipei. This wave of immigrants spoke Mandarin and various regional/provincial dialects. The early 1990s into the 2000s brought a wave of Fuzhounese Americans and Wenzhounese immigrants. Like the Taiwanese, they faced cultural and communication problems in Manhattan's predominantly Cantonese-speaking Chinatown and settled in Flushing as well as Elmhurst, Queens, which also has a significant Mandarin-speaking population. Flushing's Chinese population became very diverse over the next few decades as people from different provinces started to arrive, infusing their varied languages and cultures into this new "Chinatown." Due to the increased opening of Mainland China, there has also been a growing Northern Chinese population in Flushing.

Flushing and its Chinatown abuts the rapidly growing Long Island Koreatown as well.

=== Chinese demographic ===
The intersection of Main Street and Roosevelt Avenue, in the heart of the Chinatown neighborhood, hosts a large concentration of Chinese businesses, including Chinese restaurants. Chinese-owned businesses in particular dominate the area along Main Street and the blocks west of it, while Korean businesses are found in a substantial number east of Main Street and east of the Flushing Chinatown, on Union Street. The majority of signs and advertisements of stores in the area have become Chinese. Ethnic Chinese constitute an increasingly dominant proportion of the Asian population and as well as of the overall population in Flushing. Consequently, Flushing's Chinatown has grown rapidly enough to become the largest Chinatown outside Asia. The Flushing Chinatown has surpassed the original Manhattan Chinatown in size. As of 2023, illegal Chinese immigration to New York, and especially to Queens and its Flushing Chinatown, has accelerated. Flushing has become the present-day global epicenter receiving Chinese immigration as well as the international control center directing such migration.

A 1986 estimate by the Flushing Chinese Business Association approximated 60,000 Chinese in Flushing alone. By 1990, Asians constituted 41% of the population of the core area of Flushing, with Chinese in turn representing 41% of the Asian population. However, ethnic Chinese are constituting an increasingly dominant proportion of the Asian population as well as of the overall population in Flushing and its Chinatown. High rates of both legal and illegal immigration from Mainland China continue to spur the ongoing rise of the ethnic Chinese population in Flushing, as in all of New York City's Chinatowns.

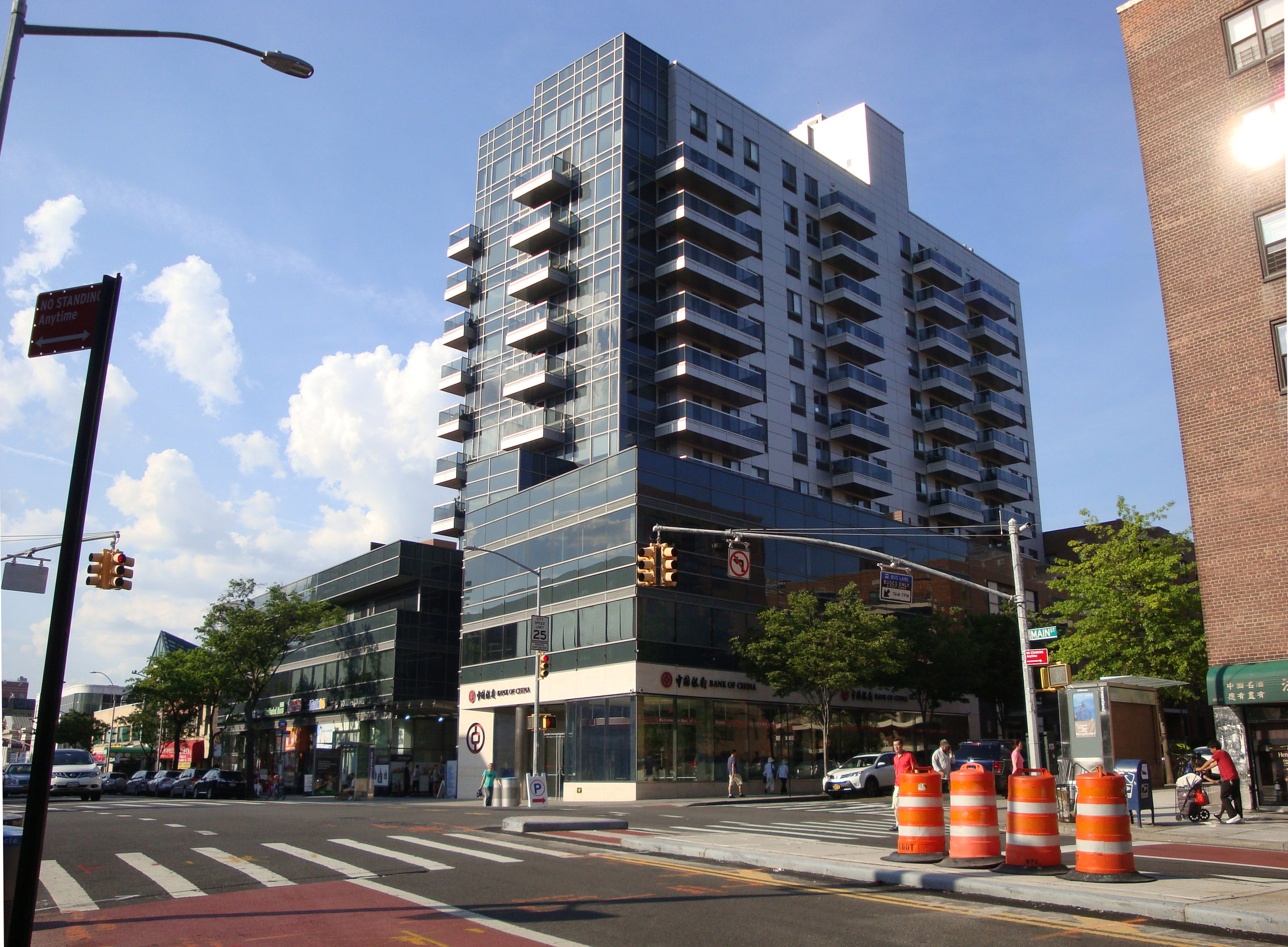
Bank of China on Main Street in Flushing

Flushing's Chinatown ranks as New York City's largest Chinese community with 33,526 Chinese, up from 17,363, a 93% increase. The Brooklyn Chinatown is the second-largest Chinatown of NYC with 34,218 Chinese residents, up from 19,963 in 2000, a 71% increase. As for Manhattan's Chinatown, its Chinese population declined by 17%, from 34,554 to 28,681 since 2000, to become the third-largest.

Of all the Chinatowns of New York City, the Flushing Chinatown is also the most diverse, with large populations of Chinese groups from various regions of Mainland China and Taiwan. The Northeastern Chinese immigrants are increasingly becoming the largest Chinese group in Flushing.

Due to Flushing's Chinatown having such varieties of Chinese residents coming from many places of China and Taiwan including a limited Cantonese speaking population, in many ways this is comparable to how Shenzhen, China as a migrant city is largely populated by residents from almost every part of China and Taiwan but because it is located in Guangdong province it still retains a limited number of the original local Cantonese and Hakka speaking populations mixed in. In many ways, this can be considered as Little Shenzhen(小深圳) despite not officially having this title or not being recognized by media.

=== Streetscape ===
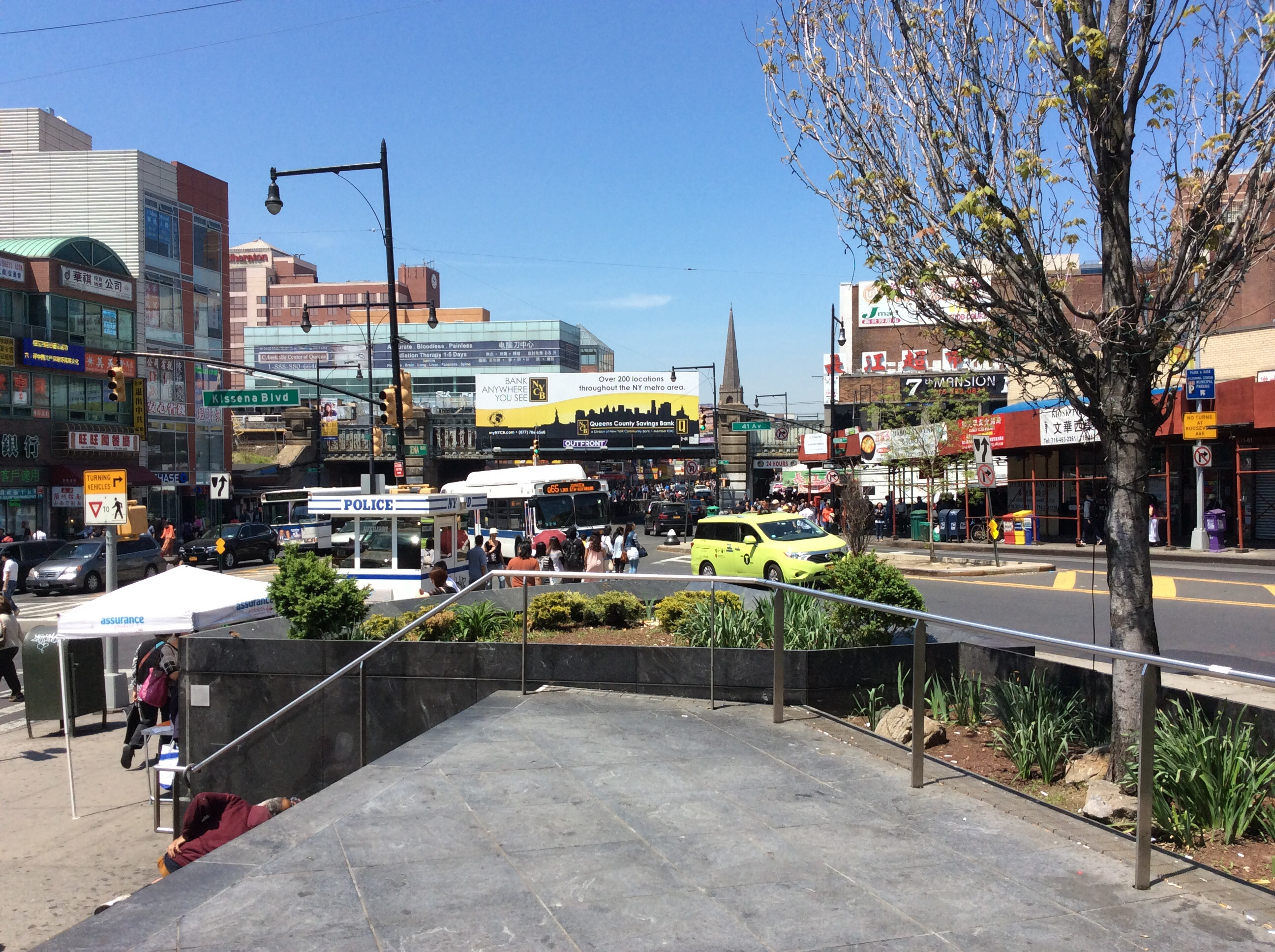
The busy intersection of Main Street, Kissena Boulevard, and 41st Avenue in the Flushing Chinatown (法拉盛華埠), the largest and fastest-growing Chinatown in the world, and one of the world's busiest pedestrian intersections. The segment of Main Street between Kissena Boulevard and Roosevelt Avenue, punctuated by the Long Island Rail Road trestle overpass, represents the cultural heart of Flushing Chinatown. Queens' rapidly growing Chinese American population was approaching 250,000 in 2016, the highest of any municipality in the United States other than New York City overall. As of 2023, illegal Chinese immigration to New York, and especially to Queens and its Flushing Chinatown, has accelerated.

=== Culture ===
Flushing Chinatown now rivals Manhattan's Chinatown as a center of Chinese culture and has been called the "Chinese Times Square" or the "Chinese Manhattan". The Lunar New Year Parade has become a growing annual celebration of Chinese New Year. More and larger Chinese supermarkets are locating and selling a diverse array of Chinese food and ingredient selections in Flushing, the largest of which include Hong Kong Supermarket and New York Supermarket, which also happen to be rapidly growing Chinese American chain supermarkets. The segment of Main Street between Roosevelt Avenue and Kissena Boulevard represents the cultural heart of Flushing Chinatown. Flushing's rise as the largest epicenter of Chinese culture outside Asia has been attributed to the remarkable diversity of regional Chinese demographics represented. The growth of the business activity at the core of Downtown Flushing, dominated by the Flushing Chinatown, has continued to flourish despite the COVID-19 pandemic.

The former Flushing Mall, a shopping center known for its Asian food court, closed in January 2015 and was subsequently redeveloped.

==== Languages ====
Many languages are spoken in Flushing Chinatown. English can be heard alongside many Sinitic languages, such as various Mandarin (Northeastern Mandarin, Beijing dialect), Min (Fuzhounese, Hokkien), Wu (Shanghainese, Suzhounese, Hangzhounese, Wenzhounese) and Cantonese, while Hakka varieties and Mongolian are now emerging.

==== Cuisine ====
The most popular styles of Chinese cuisine are accessible in Flushing, including Korean-Chinese cuisine, Hakka, Taiwanese, Shanghainese, Hunanese, Sichuanese, Cantonese, Fujianese, Xinjiang, and Zhejiang cuisine. Even the relatively obscure Dongbei style of cuisine indigenous to Northeast China is now available in Flushing, as well as Mongolian cuisine and Uyghur cuisine. These diverse Chinese immigrant populations have brought with them their own regional food cuisines which have led to Flushing being considered the "food mecca" for Chinese regional cuisine outside of Asia.

==== Media ====
The World Journal, one of the largest Chinese-language newspapers outside China, is headquartered in adjacent Whitestone, Queens, with offices in Flushing as well. Numerous other Chinese newspapers such as the China Press, Sing Tao Daily, The Epoch Times, as well as other English-language publications, are available in the Flushing Chinatown.

SinoVision, one of the largest Chinese-speaking media networks in North America, also has headquarters in Flushing.

==== Educational centers ====
In accompaniment with its rapid growth, Flushing in particular has witnessed the proliferation of highly competitive businesses touted as educational centers as well as non-profit organizations declaring the intent to educate the community. Some entities offer education in Mandarin, the lingua franca of Mainland China; others profess to provide students with intensive training in computer and technological proficiency; while still others entice high school students with rigorous preparatory classes for college entrance examinations in mathematics, science, and English literacy (see: cram school and buxiban).

=== Public institutions and services ===
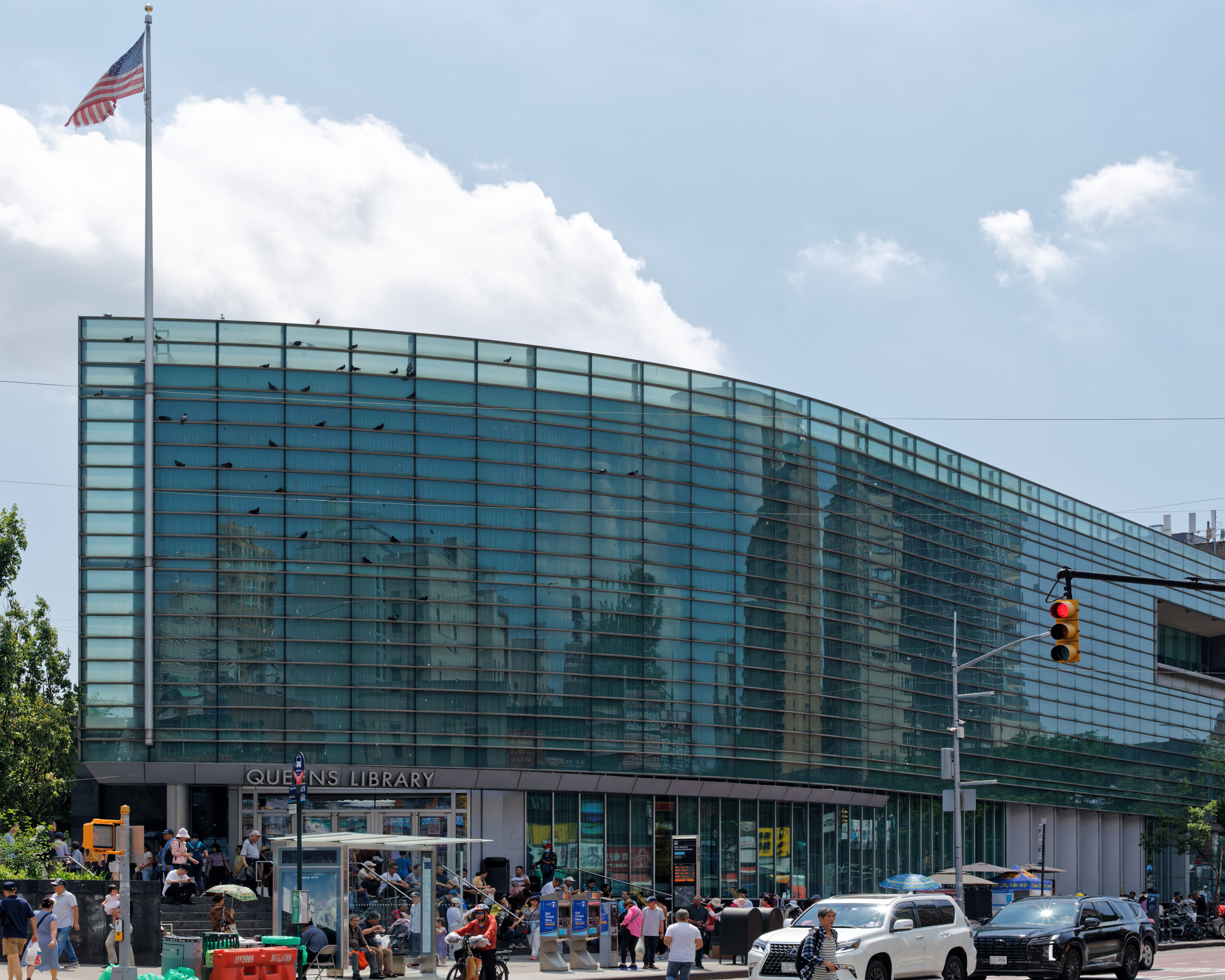
A branch of the Queens Public Library in Flushing Chinatown.

The largest of the Flushing branches of the Queens Borough Public Library is located at the intersection of Kissena Boulevard and Main Street. This library houses an auditorium for public events.

New York Hospital Queens, a member of the NewYork-Presbyterian Healthcare System, is a major medical center providing Flushing as well as surrounding communities with comprehensive medical care services. Numerous tertiary medical clinics also serve the residents of Flushing.

A diverse array of social services geared toward assisting recent as well as established Chinese immigrants is readily available in Flushing.

=== Transportation ===
The New York City Subway's 7 and <7> trains has its terminus at Flushing – Main Street; the intersection of Main Street and Roosevelt Avenue, at the heart of Flushing Chinatown, is the third busiest intersection in New York City, behind only Times Square and Herald Square in Manhattan. It is the busiest subway station in Queens and the 12th busiest station overall As of 2016. Numerous other public bus and rail connections also serve Chinatown at the Main Street/Roosevelt Avenue intersection, including 22 bus routes operated by New York City Bus, MTA Bus, and NICE Bus, as well as the Port Washington Branch of the Long Island Rail Road. Flushing Chinatown is also readily accessible by automobile from several major highways, namely the Grand Central Parkway and the Whitestone Expressway/Van Wyck Expressway. There are also multiple dollar van services shuttling passengers between Flushing Chinatown and the other Chinatowns in New York City and Long Island.

=== Political clout ===
The political stature of Flushing Chinatown appears to be increasing significantly. Taiwan-born John Liu, former New York City Council member representing District 20, which includes Flushing Chinatown and other northern Queens neighborhoods, was elected New York City Comptroller in November 2009. Concomitantly, Peter Koo, born in Shanghai, China was elected to succeed Liu to assume this council membership seat.

=== Controversy ===
In March 2019, The New York Times reported that the Flushing Chinatown has also become the epicenter of organized prostitution in the United States, importing women from China, Korea, Thailand, and Eastern Europe to sustain the underground North American sex trade.

== Satellite Chinatowns ==
=== Chinatown in Elmhurst ===
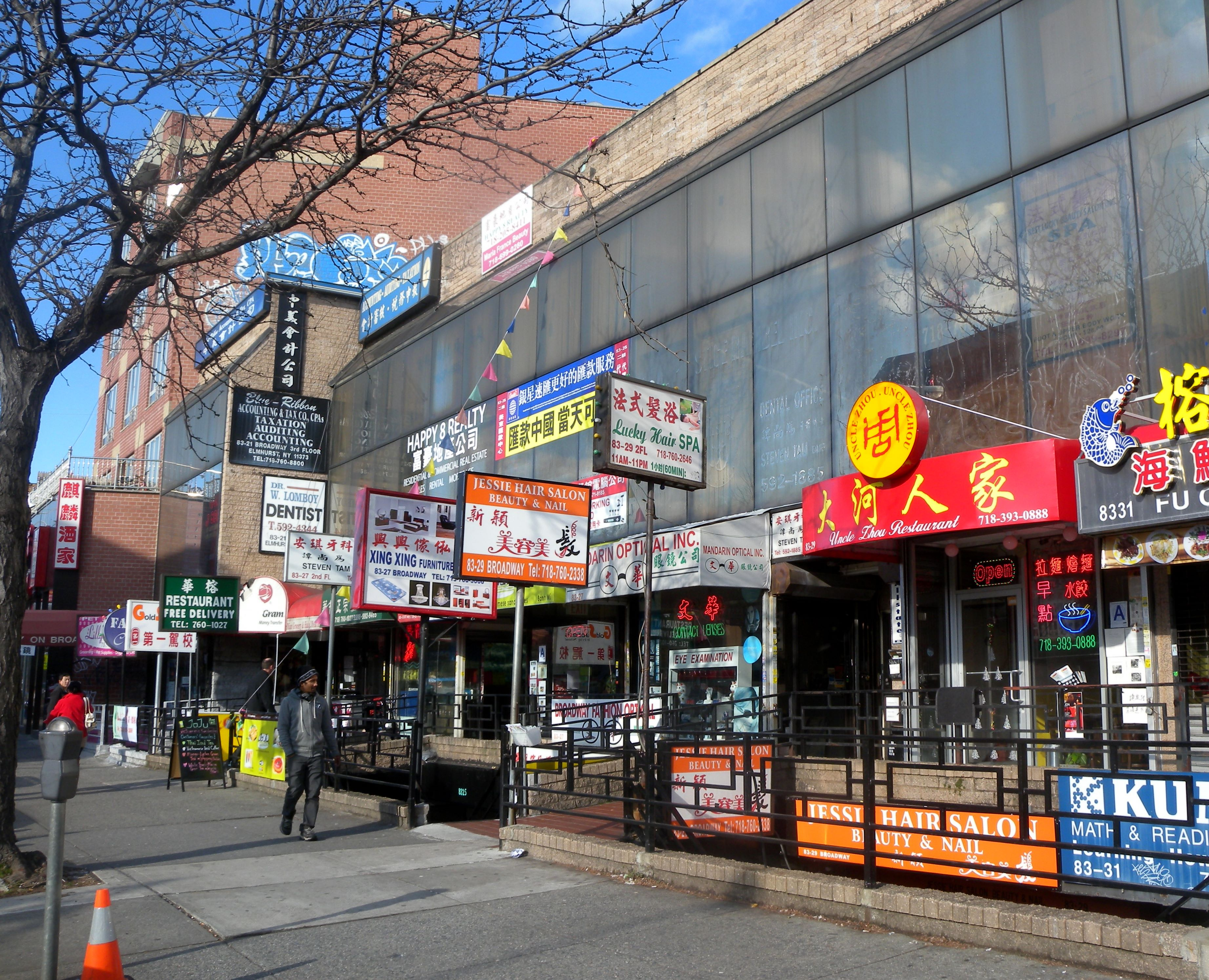
The Elmhurst Chinatown on Broadway, a satellite of Flushing Chinatown.

Elmhurst's rapidly growing Chinatown is the second in Queens, in addition to the Flushing Chinatown. Previously a small area with Chinese shops on Broadway between 81st Street and Cornish Avenue, this newly evolved second Chinatown in Queens has now expanded to 45th Avenue and Whitney Avenue and is developing as a satellite of the Flushing Chinatown. There are also many other Southeast Asian businesses and shops in the area, including Malaysian Chinese, Singaporean Chinese, Indonesian, Thai, and Vietnamese. Hong Kong Supermarket and New York Supermarket serve as the largest Chinese supermarkets selling different food varieties to this Elmhurst Chinatown. Financial institutions have emerged along Broadway to serve the various Chinese communities of Elmhurst. Like Flushing's Chinatown, it is also very highly populated by Mandarin speakers, although many also speak other languages like Hakka.

=== Chinese enclave in Corona ===
An annexation of the Elmhurst Chinatown is the neighborhood of Corona, emerging as a Chinatown geographically connecting the larger Chinatowns in Flushing and Elmhurst.

=== Chinese enclave in Whitestone ===
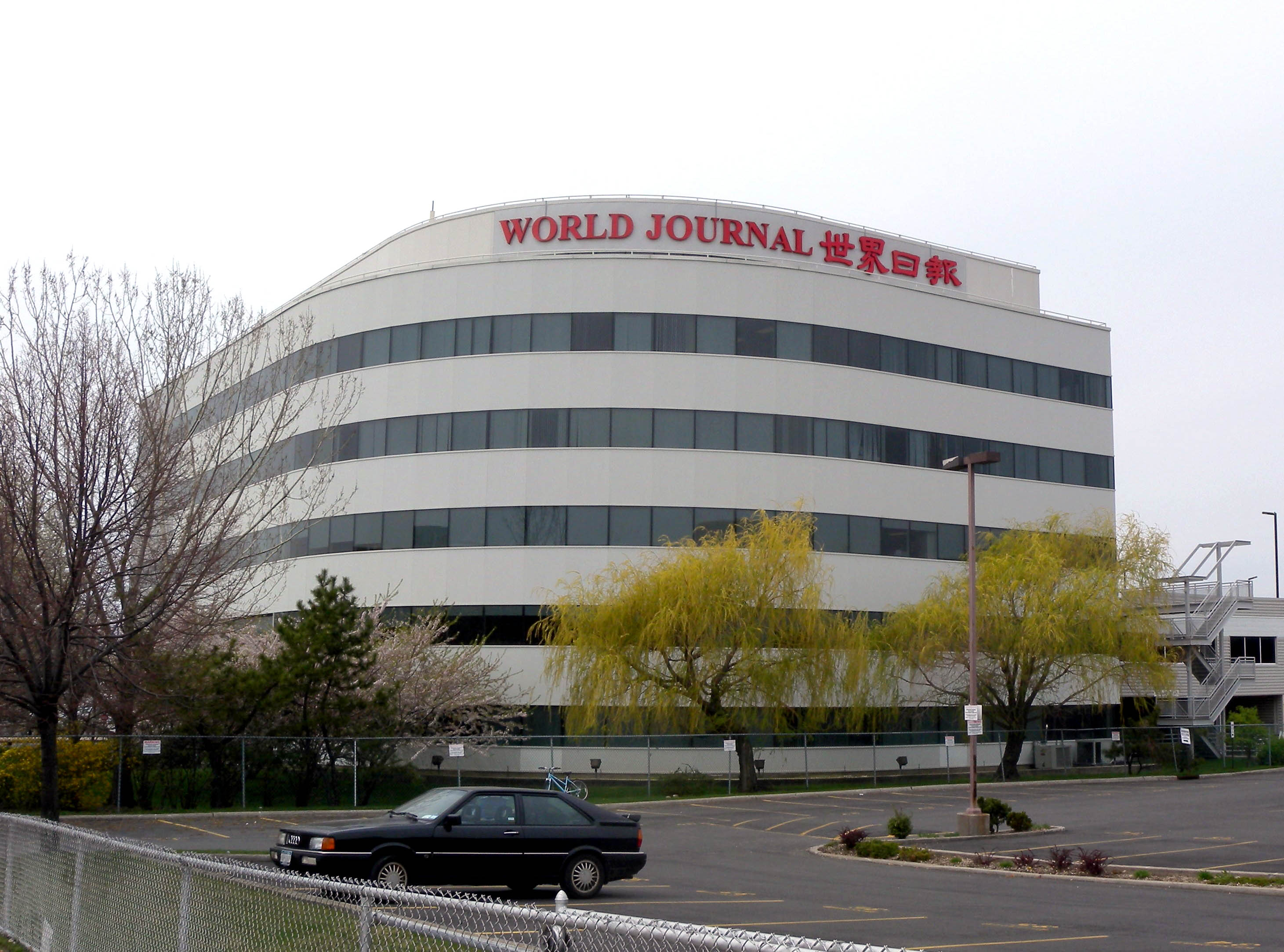
The World Journal, the largest Chinese-language newspaper in the United States and one of the largest Chinese-language newspapers outside of China, with a daily circulation of 350,000, is headquartered in Whitestone, Queens, with offices in the adjacent Flushing Chinatown as well.

Since 2000, thousands of Chinese Americans have migrated into Whitestone, given the sizeable presence of the neighboring Flushing Chinatown, and have continued their expansion eastward in Queens and into neighboring, highly educated Nassau County on Long Island, which has become the leading suburban destination in the U.S. for Chinese. The World Journal, the largest Chinese-language newspaper in the United States and one of the largest Chinese-language newspapers outside China, with a daily circulation of 350,000, is headquartered in Whitestone. The New York office of Hong Kong-based Lee Kum Kee International Holdings Ltd. is also located in Whitestone.

=== Wealthy Chinatown in Long Island City ===
Since the 2020s, there has also been a rapidly growing Chinese enclave in Long Island City, composed mainly of higher-income residents; this community was described in LIC Journal as "New York's newest Chinatown". The expanding Chinese enclave was part of a larger trend of growth in the community's Asian population, which was 34% Asian by 2021. Most of the new Asian residents in Long Island City are East Asian, specifically Chinese, Korean, or Japanese, and are second- or third-generation Americans. These residents have largely moved to the luxury housing developments that were built in the neighborhood in Long Island City, and some preschools and restaurants have been added for the growing population. On the other side of Long Island City, the Queensbridge Houses public-housing development has also been receiving working class Asian residents, with many of them being Chinese.

== See also ==
- Long Island

Chinatowns:

- Chinatown
- Chinese Americans in New York City
- Chinatowns in Brooklyn
- Chinatown, Manhattan
- Little Hong Kong/Guangdong
- Little Fuzhou
- Chinatown, Avenue U
- Chinatown, Bensonhurst
- New Dorp, Staten Island
- Chinatowns in Canada and the United States
- List of Chinatowns in the United States

Koreatowns:

- Koreatown
- Koreatown, Manhattan
- Koreatown, Long Island
- Koreatown, Fort Lee
- Koreatown, Palisades Park
