= List of U.S. cities with large Hungarian-American populations =

U.S. cities and communities with large Hungarian American populations are largely concentrated in Ohio (193,951), New York (137,029), California (133,988), Pennsylvania (132,184), New Jersey (115,615), Michigan (98,036) and in Florida (96,885).

== Ranked by population ==
The following cities and municipalities are among those that have 1,000 or more residents who are of Hungarian ancestry (in descending order by Hungarian population):

- New York City 57,673 (0.7%)
- Los Angeles, California 16,802 (0.4%)
- Chicago, Illinois 8,600 (0.3%)
- Cleveland, Ohio 7,632 (1.9%) (in another source: 61,681)
- Columbus, Ohio 6,144 (0.8%)
- Toledo, Ohio 6,093 (2.2%)
- Philadelphia, Pennsylvania 5,323 (0.3%)
- Pittsburgh, Pennsylvania 3,980 (1.3%)
- South Bend, Indiana 3,559 (3.5%)
- San Francisco, California 3,456 (0.4%)
- Indianapolis, Indiana 2,524 (0.3%)
- Buffalo, New York 2,405 (0.9%)
- Dallas, Texas 2,250 (0.2%)
- Washington, D.C. 1,702 (0.3%)
- Detroit, Michigan 1,297 (0.2%)
- Cincinnati, Ohio 1,197 (0.4%)

== Ranked by percentage ==
The following communities have more than 5% of the population as being of Hungarian ancestry, based on data extracted from the United States Census, 2000, for communities with more than 1,000 individuals identifying their ancestry (in descending order by percentage of population):

- Kiryas Joel, New York 18.9%
- Fairport Harbor, Ohio 11.8%
- West Pike Run Township, Pennsylvania 11.7%
- Freemansburg, Pennsylvania 9.6%
- Paint, Pennsylvania 9.6%
- Kaser, New York 9.4%
- New Square, New York 8.8%
- Windsor, Ohio 8.2%
- West Brownsville, Pennsylvania 8.1%
- Monroe (town), New York 8.0%
- Colebrook Township, Ashtabula County, Ohio 7.9%
- Fountain Hill, Pennsylvania 7.9%
- Alpha, New Jersey 7.9%
- Elyria, Ohio 7.8%
- Tiltonsville, Ohio 7.7%
- Sewaren, New Jersey 7.7%
- Beachwood, Ohio 7.4%
- Hartsgrove Township, Ashtabula County, Ohio 7.3%
- Amherst, Ohio 7.2%
- Russell Township, Geauga County, Ohio 7.1%

== See also ==
- Lists of U.S. cities with large ethnic population
