= Waipahu, Hawaii =

Census-designated place in Hawaii, United States

Waipahu
- Census-designated place
- Location in Honolulu County and the state of Hawaii

- Location in Hawaii
- Coordinates: 21°23′33″N 158°0′39″W
- Country: United States
- State: Hawaii
- County: Honolulu

Area
  - Total: 2.80 sq mi (7.25 km^{2})
  - Land: 2.68 sq mi (6.94 km^{2})
  - Water: 0.12 sq mi (0.31 km^{2})
- Elevation: 62 ft (19 m)

Population (2020)
  - Total: 43,485
  - Density: 16,237.8/sq mi (6,269.45/km^{2})
- Time zone: UTC−10 (Hawaii-Aleutian)
- ZIP code: 96797
- Area code: 808
- FIPS code: 15-79700
- GNIS feature ID: 0364878

Waipahu (Hawaiian pronunciation: [vɐjˈpɐhu]) is a former sugarcane plantation town and now census-designated place (CDP) in the ʻEwa District on the island of Oʻahu in the City & County of Honolulu, Hawaiʻi, United States. As of the 2020 census, the CDP population was 43,485. The U.S. postal code for Waipahu is 96797.

== History ==
Waipahu is the name of an artesian spring. In Hawaiian, "Waipahu" derives from wai, meaning water, and pahū, meaning "burst or explode"; "Waipahu" thus means "water forced up (as out of a spring)". The early Native Hawaiians took pleasure in the cool and clear water gushing from the ground and named this spring Waipahu. Before Western civilization came to Hawaii, Hawaiians considered Waipahu the capital of Oahu. Royalty in the Kingdom of Hawaii often gathered and enjoyed the fresh water from the spring Waipahu.

Oahu Sugar Company at Waipahu (Gold Bond Certificate)

In 1897, Oahu Sugar Company was incorporated, and its board of directors built the sugar mill in Waipahu. It had 943 field workers. There were 44 Hawaiians, including 10 minors; 57 Portuguese; 443 Japanese, 408 of them contract laborers; and 399 Chinese, 374 of them contract laborers. The company's managers from 1897 to 1940 were August Ahrens (1897–1904), E.K. Bull (1904–1919), J.B. Thomson (1919–1923), E.W. Greene (1923–1937), and Hans L'Orange (1937–1956).

In the early days of the plantation, each worker was assigned a number inscribed on a metal disc about the size of a silver dollar. The numbers 1 through 899 identified Japanese aliens; 900 through 1400 were Japanese who were US citizens or Hawaii-born. The 2000 and 2100 series were Portuguese laborers, 2200 Spanish, 2300 Hawaiian, 2400 Puerto Rican, 3000 Chinese or Korean, 4000 and 5000 Filipino. The company imported laborers from the Philippines, Japan, China, Portugal, and Norway. Very few of its laborers were Hawaiian. Most of its first laborers were either Japanese or Chinese. Plantation workers lived by what was called The Plantation System. Field workers received an average monthly salary of $12.50. Filipino immigrants were paid less because they were the cheapest to import, less than $10 a month on average. The Chinese generally were paid the most, with a monthly average of $15.

In 1932, the Oahu Sugar Co. opened a continuation school, and allowed a half-day off from work once a week for workers to attend. Those unavailable during the day could attend evening courses. This was to give them a chance at a better job.

During the surprise attack on Pearl Harbor on December 7, 1941, Imperial Japanese Navy (IJN) planes fired at the sugar mill in Waipahu, killing a civilian and injuring seven others.

Amfac, Inc. acquired the company in 1961. Oahu Sugar Company shut down plantation operations after the 1995 harvest.

In 1923, the Oahu Sugar Company field also served as the community center, with band concerts, sporting events, and carnivals. Later, the athletic field was renamed Hans L'Orange Field. Today, the park is primarily used for baseball, and is the home field of Hawaii Pacific University's men's baseball team, the Sea Warriors. It was the home field of the Hawaii Winter Baseball teams the North Shore Honu and West Oahu CaneFires until 2008.

In 1973, the City and County of Honolulu and the State of Hawai'i purchased 40 acres (160,000 m^{2}) opposite the Waipahu sugar mill to establish the Waipahu Cultural and Garden Park. The park is known today as the Hawai'i Plantation Village. Hawai'i Plantation Village is a living history museum in Waipahu.

In 1997, Hawaii Governor Benjamin J. Cayetano proclaimed June through November 1997 Waipahu Centennial Celebration Months. Many activities and events were held to celebrate the Waipahu Centennial.

Waipahu is the home to the 2008 Little League World Series champions from Waipi'o Little League. They defeated Matamoros, Mexico 12–3 in the final game on August 24, 2008. On August 28, 2010, the team won the U.S. championship of the Little League World Series, defeating the team from Pearland, Texas, but lost to Edogawa Minami LL of Tokyo on August 29, 2010, in the international championship.

== Geography ==
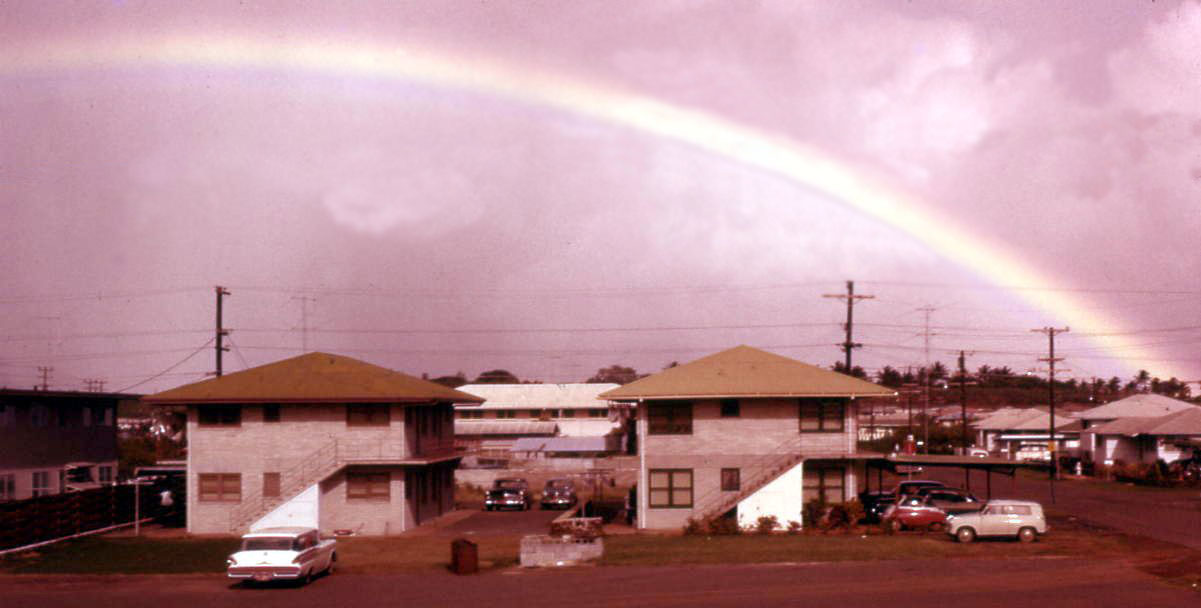
Rainbow over Waipahu. Farrington Hwy, 1958

Waipahu is along the northern shore of both Middle Loch and West Loch of Pearl Harbor. Both Interstate H-1 and Farrington Highway (Hawaii Route 90) run east–west through Waipahu. The town of Waipahu spans three ahupuaʻa (historic Native Hawaiian land division): Waipiʻo, Waikele, and Hōʻaeʻae. It is common for neighborhoods to be named after their ahupuaʻa. The neighboring areas of Waipio, Village Park, Royal Kunia and Waikele use Waipahu as their postal city, and are often considered part of Waipahu.

Several streams run through Waipahu, including Waikele Stream and Kapakahi Stream. Waikele Stream runs along the Hawaii Plantation Village and into Pouhala Marsh Wildlife Sanctuary, which is habitat for several endangered bird species endemic to Hawaii. There is roughly 140 feet of elevation change between the north side of Waipahu along H-1 and sea level.

Waikele is across Interstate H1 north of Waipahu. Waikele consists of newer subdivisions, an upscale outlet shopping center, and a world-famous golf course. To the west via either roadway can be reached Makakilo and Kapolei, with the Leeward coast beyond. To the east lie Pearl City and the H-2 interchange to Waipiʻo. At the western end of Waipahu is Kunia Road (State Rte. 750), which leads to the newer growth areas of Royal Kunia and Village Park north of H-1, and across the central plain to Kunia and Schofield Barracks, Wheeler Army Airfield, and Wahiawā. Kunia Road becomes Fort Weaver Road (State Rte. 76) south of Farrington Highway, and goes south through Honouliuli and ʻEwa Villages to ʻEwa Beach.

According to the United States Census Bureau, the CDP has an area of 2.8 square miles (7.2 km^{2}), all land.

== Demographics ==
Historical population
Census	Pop.	Note	%±
1970	24,150		—
1980	29,139		20.7%
1990	31,435		7.9%
2000	33,108		5.3%
2010	38,216		15.4%
2020	43,485		13.8%
U.S. Decennial Census

=== 2020 census ===
As of the 2020 census, Waipahu had a population of 43,485. The median age was 40.7 years. 22.0% of residents were under the age of 18 and 19.2% of residents were 65 years of age or older. For every 100 females there were 97.4 males, and for every 100 females age 18 and over there were 94.6 males age 18 and over.

100.0% of residents lived in urban areas.

There were 9,743 households in Waipahu, of which 45.1% had children under the age of 18 living in them. Of all households, 52.9% were married-couple households, 16.2% were households with a male householder and no spouse or partner present, and 25.1% were households with a female householder and no spouse or partner present. About 13.0% of all households were made up of individuals and 6.5% had someone living alone who was 65 years of age or older.

There were 10,154 housing units, of which 4.0% were vacant. The homeowner vacancy rate was 0.5% and the rental vacancy rate was 3.6%.

The most reported ancestries in the 2020 census were:

- Filipino (71.1%)
- Japanese (10.5%)
- Native Hawaiian (10.2%)
- Chinese (6.3%)
- Samoan (5.6%)
- German (2.5%)
- Portuguese (2.5%)
- Marshallese (2.3%)
- Irish (2.1%)
- Puerto Rican (2%)

Racial composition as of the 2020 census
Race	Number	Percent
White	1,050	2.4%
Black or African American	256	0.6%
American Indian and Alaska Native	34	0.1%
Asian	31,407	72.2%
Native Hawaiian and Other Pacific Islander	5,379	12.4%
Some other race	221	0.5%
Two or more races	5,138	11.8%
Hispanic or Latino (of any race)	2,040	4.7%

=== 2000 census ===
As of the 2000 census, there were 33,108 people, 7,566 households, and 6,431 families residing in the CDP. The population density was 12,882.8 inhabitants per square mile (4,974.1/km^{2}). There were 8,033 housing units at an average density of 3,125.7 per square mile (1,206.8/km^{2}). The racial makeup of the CDP was 4.73% White, 0.93% African American, 0.14% Native American, 67.1% Asian (55.5% Filipino), 12.31% Pacific Islander, 0.86% from other races, and 15.26% from two or more races. Hispanic or Latino residents of any race were 6.09% of the population.

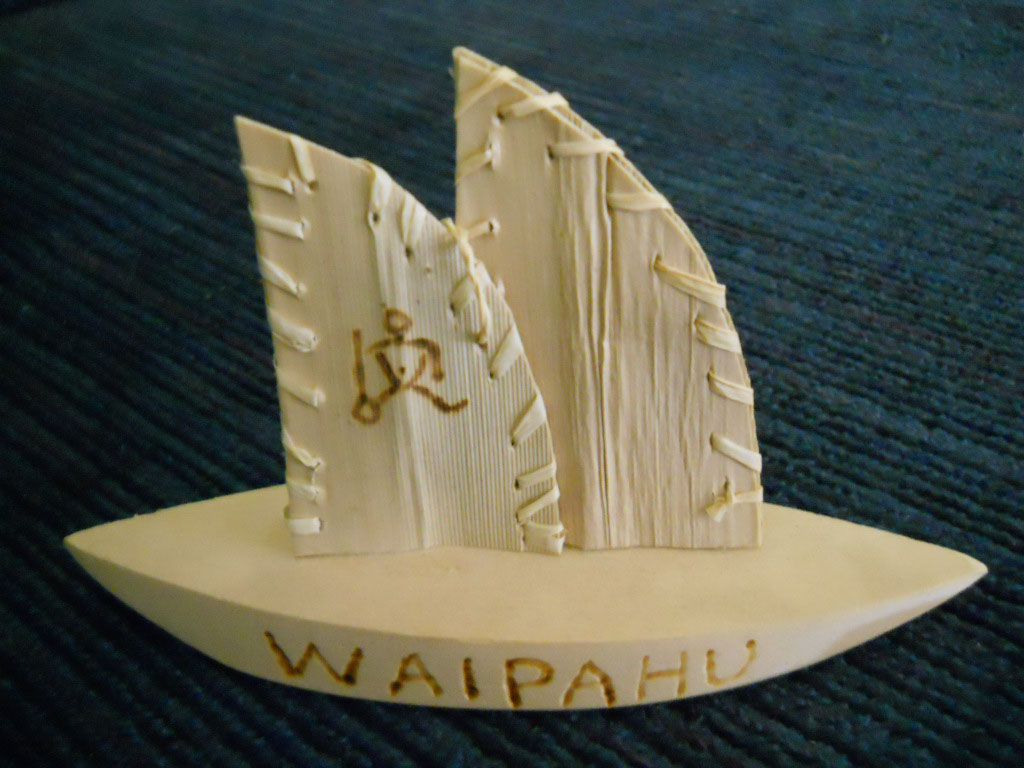
Souvenir miniature wooden boat from Waipahu

There were 7,566 households, of which 36.2% had children under the age of 18 living with them, 59.8% were married couples living together, 18.1% had a female householder with no husband present, and 15.0% were non-families. 11.1% of all households were made up of individuals, and 6.0% had someone living alone who was 65 years of age or older. The average household size was 4.23 and the average family size was 4.37.

In the CDP, 26.4% of the population was under the age of 18, 9.5% was from 18 to 24, 26.8% from 25 to 44, 21.5% from 45 to 64, and 15.8% was 65 years of age or older. The median age was 36 years. For every 100 females there were 97.6 males. For every 100 females age 18 and over, there were 95.3 males.

The median income for a household in the CDP was $49,444, and the median income for a family was $51,855. Males had a median income of $28,295 versus $23,818 for females. The per capita income for the CDP was $14,484. About 10.6% of families and 13.8% of the population were below the poverty line, including 17.0% of those under age 18 and 13.9% of those age 65 or over.

The number of civilian veterans in Waipahu was 2,376, or 9.8% of the total population (the national average is 12.7%).

In 2000, 8,230 people in Waipahu were listed as disabled.

At the time of the last survey, 14,458 people in Waipahu had a high school diploma, approximately 68.6% of the population (compared to the national average of 80.4%).

2,349 people in Waipahu also had a bachelor's degree or higher, approximately 11.1% of the population (the national average was 24.4%).

== Government, economy, and infrastructure ==
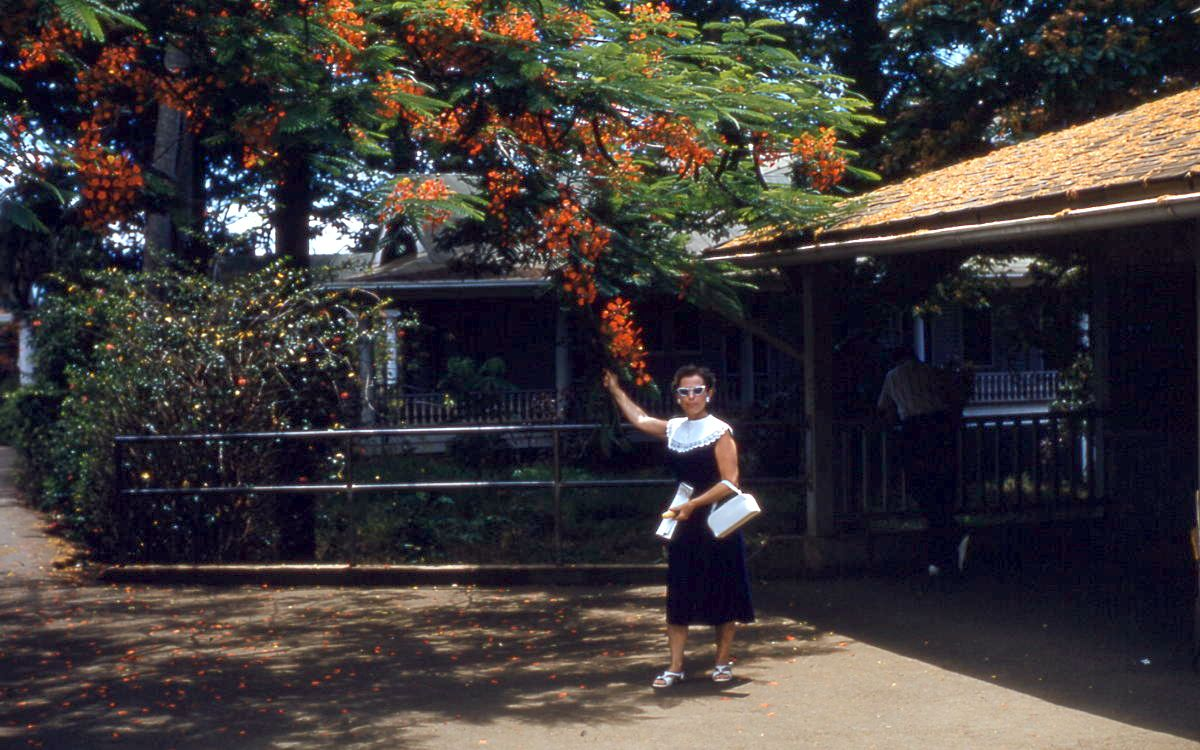
Waipahu Post Office, 1959

The United States Postal Service operates the Waipahu Post Office in Waipahu.

The Hawaii Department of Public Safety operates the Waiawa Correctional Facility in an area near Waipahu.

== Education ==
The Hawaii Department of Education operates public schools.

Elementary schools in the CDP include August Ahrens, Honowai, and Waipahu. Two other elementary schools are outside the Waipahu CDP but use Waipahu postal addresses: Kale'iopu'u Elementary School is in Royal Kunia CDP (formerly in Village Park CDP), and Waikele Elementary School is in Waikele CDP.

Waipahu Intermediate School and Waipahu High School are in the CDP.

Waipahu contains two school districts, with some students attending Waipahu High School and others attending Pearl City High School.

Lanakila Baptist School maintains its administrative office and elementary school building in Waipahu.

== Hawaii's Plantation Village ==
The Hawaii Plantation Village serves as an outdoor museum that showcases the lifestyles and experiences of Hawaii's plantation workers. The museum opened on September 20, 1992, displaying original structures and replica homes of the multiethnic groups who came to Hawaii between the mid-1800s and the 1940s to work as plantation laborers. Guided tours are conducted at the start of each hour, Monday through Saturday from 10 a.m. to 2 p.m.

== Notable residents ==
- Danny Barcelona, drummer in Louis Armstrong's All-Star Band, born in Waipahu.
- Kirk Caldwell, mayor of Honolulu, born in Waipahu
- Timmy Chang, NFL player and NCAA coach, born in Waipahu.
- Brian Viloria, professional boxer
- Jerome Williams, MLB player, 1999 graduate of Waipahu High School.
- Victoria Lee, One Championship mixed martial arts.
