= List of U.S. cities with large Vietnamese-American populations =

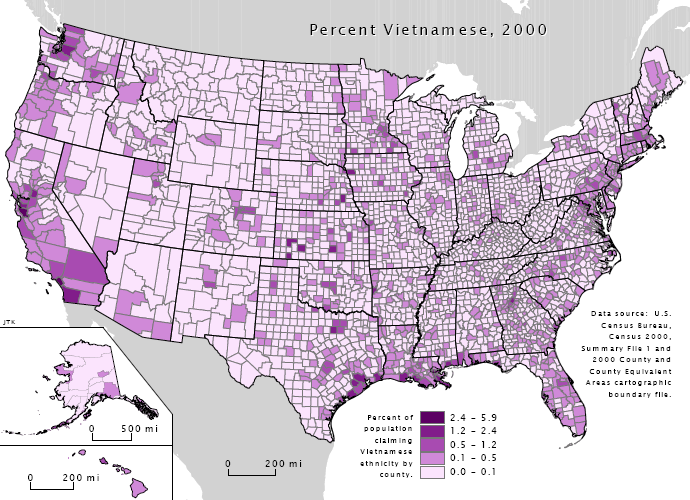
Darker colors indicate counties with higher percentage of Vietnamese population, from 2000 US Census

The following is a list of U.S. cities with large Vietnamese-American populations. They consist of cities with at least 10,000 Vietnamese Americans or where Vietnamese Americans constitute a large percentage of the population. The information contained here was based on the 2010 U.S. census.

Vietnamese-Americans immigrated to the United States in different waves. The first wave of Vietnamese from just before or after the Fall of Saigon/the last day of the Vietnam War, April 30, 1975. They consisted of mostly educated, white collar public servants, senior military officers, and upper and middle class Vietnamese and their families. The second wave came in the 1980s escaping very precariously in boats from the communist regime as boat people. In the 1990s and 2000s, a third wave came from the US's Humanitarian Operation Program, family members of Vietnamese Americans, former prisoners of re-education camps, and Amerasian children of American servicemen who applied for entry into the United States. Vietnamese Americans vary in income level, with some being upper-class while others, particular those who came later, are working-class.

As of 2020, there were nearly 2 million Vietnamese Americans in the United States.

Vietnamese Americans are mainly concentrated in metropolitan areas in the West, including Orange County, California, San Jose, California, and Houston, Texas.

== Cities with more than 10,000 Vietnamese Americans ==
These cities have more than 10,000 Vietnamese Americans according to the 2012-2016 American Community Survey, sorted by number.

Rank	City	Number (2016)	Percentage (2016)	Comment
1	San Jose, California	106,992	10.6	The Pew Research Center has estimated that 143,000 residents in the San Jose, California, metropolitan area were Vietnamese in 2019.
2	Garden Grove, California	52,894	30.3	Part of Little Saigon in Orange County, California
3	Houston, Texas	38,619	1.7	Little Saigon in Houston is located in Midtown and growing population in Chinatown.
4	San Diego, California	37,606	2.7	Little Saigon in the City Heights neighborhood.
5	Westminster, California	36,689	40.0	Part of Little Saigon in Orange County, California. City with the most Vietnamese Americans per capita. Its mayor, Chi Charlie Nguyen, is Vietnamese American.
6	Santa Ana, California	24,702	7.4	Part of Little Saigon in Orange County, California
7	Los Angeles, California	21,981	0.6	Located near Orange County, California Little Saigon in the heart of Chinatown
8	Anaheim, California	17,896	5.2	Located in Orange County, California
9	Philadelphia, Pennsylvania	16,682	1.1	Largest community in South Philadelphia. Also, clusters in the Olney and Logan sections as well as parts of the Lower Northeast, Chinatown, and nearby Camden, New Jersey.
10	Arlington, Texas	14,892	3.9	in the Dallas-Fort Worth region
11	San Francisco, California	14,657	1.7	Little Saigon, designated in the Tenderloin District, although population spread throughout city
12	Portland, Oregon	14,116	2.3	Sandy Boulevard was known as "Saigon Blvd." during the mid-1990s, 82nd Avenue has a growing enclave as well as suburban Clackamas County
13	New York, New York	13,864	0.2	Growing enclave within Manhattan's Chinatown. Growing populations in Queens and the Bronx.
14	Garland, Texas	12,486	5.5	In the Dallas-Fort Worth Metroplex
15	Chicago, Illinois	12,280	0.447	Little Saigon district is located at Chicago's Argyle Street.
16	Seattle, Washington	11,974	1.8	Little Saigon at east end of International District
17	Oklahoma City, Oklahoma	11,730	1.9	Little Saigon in Asian District of Central Oklahoma City
18	Boston, Massachusetts	11,614	1.8	Growing enclaves in Dorchester and neighboring city of Quincy. Established within Chinatown.
19	Fountain Valley, California	11,561	20.4	Part of Little Saigon in Orange County, California
20	Milpitas, California	11,165	15.2	Near San Jose, California

== Major cities ==
These cities have more than 500,000 people consisting of at least 2% Vietnamese American in the 2010 census, sorted by percentage.

City	Percentage	Number	Note
San Jose, California	10.6	106,379	
San Diego, California	2.8	37,720	
Portland, Oregon	2.1	12,806	

== Medium cities ==
These cities have between 100,000 and 500,000 people and are at least 4% Vietnamese American in the 2010 Census, sorted by percentage.

City	Percentage	Number	Note
Garden Grove, California	29.8	52,025	Part of Little Saigon in Orange County
El Monte, California	7.5	8,654	Many Chinese-Vietnamese
Santa Ana, California	7.2	23,907	In Orange County
Garland, Texas	5.2	12,118	in the Dallas-Fort Worth Metroplex
Anaheim, California	5.0	17,192	In Orange County
Arlington, Texas	4.2	16,043	in the Dallas-Fort Worth Metroplex

== Small cities ==
These cities have between 10,000 and 100,000 people and consist of at least 6% Vietnamese American in the 2010-15 American Community Survey, sorted by percentage.

City	Percentage	Number	Note
Westminster, California	40.3	36,954	The heart of Little Saigon, traditionally considered the center of overseas Vietnamese culture in the US. Located in Orange County, California. The mayor of the city, Chi Charlie Nguyen, is Vietnamese-American.
Fountain Valley, California	20.7	11,747	Part of Little Saigon in Orange County, California
Stanton, California	16.9	6,526	Part of Little Saigon in Orange County, California
Rosemead, California	15.4	8,401	Many Chinese-Vietnamese, who might self-report as either Chinese or Vietnamese
Milpitas, California	14.9	10,639	Adjacent to San Jose (north)
West Falls Church, Virginia	8.5	2,494	Fairfax County, Virginia
Springfield, Virginia	8.2	2,482	Fairfax County, Virginia
Harvey, Louisiana	8.0	1,628	New Orleans suburb
White Center, Washington	7.4	1,091	Adjacent to Seattle
San Gabriel, California	6.3	2,524	Many Chinese-Vietnamese

== Towns ==
These cities have fewer than 10,000 people and consist of at least 8% Vietnamese American in the 2010 Census, sorted by percentage.

City	Percentage	Number	Note
Midway City, California	41.4	3,511	Part of Little Saigon in Orange County, California
Morrow, Georgia	20.3	1,307	
Avondale, Louisiana	20.1	1,048	New Orleans suburb
Henderson, Louisiana	18.0	300	
Amelia, Louisiana	17.8	437	
Bayou La Batre, Alabama	14.5	370	Involved in fishery
Lake City, Georgia	13.0	340	
Palacios, Texas	8.1	383	

== Counties ==
Ten largest counties with Vietnamese Americans according to the 2010 Census, sorted by number.

Rank	County	Number (2010)	Percentage (2010)	Metropolitan Region
1	Orange County, California	227,070	6.1	Greater Los Angeles
2	Santa Clara County, California	153,099	7.1	San Francisco Bay Area: South
3	Los Angeles County, California	122,063	0.9	Los Angeles
4	Harris County, Texas	108,028	2.0	Houston
5	King County, Washington	88,028	1.4	Seattle
6	San Diego County, California	51,030	2.0	San Diego
7	Alameda County, California	30,533	2.0	San Francisco Bay Area: East
8	Tarrant County, Texas	29,128	1.6	Dallas/ Fort Worth
9	Fairfax County, Virginia	28,770	2.7	Greater Washington: Virginia
10	Dallas County, Texas	26,276	1.1	Dallas/Fort Worth

== See also ==
- Growing Up American
- Little Saigon
- Lists of U.S. cities with large ethnic population
- List of U.S. cities with Asian American majority populations
