= List of the United States cities with large Polish-American populations =

U.S. cities and communities with large Polish American populations are largely concentrated in the Upper Midwestern United States, Chicago metropolitan area and the New York metropolitan area, with Wisconsin accounting for the largest number of communities with large Polish populations.

== Ranked by population ==
The following cities and municipalities are among those that have 10,000 or more residents who are of Polish ancestry (in descending order by Polish population):

City	Population Count	Population Percentage	Source
New York City, New York	213,447	2.7%	
Chicago, Illinois	210,421	7.3%	
Philadelphia, Pennsylvania	65,508	4.3%	
Milwaukee, Wisconsin	57,485	9.6%	
Los Angeles, California	56,670	1.5%	
Cheektowaga, New York	37,560	39.9%	
Buffalo, New York	34,254	11.7%	
Phoenix, Arizona	32,050	2.4%	
Toledo, Ohio	31,792	10.1%	
Warren, Michigan	28,370	21%	
Pittsburgh, Pennsylvania	28,178	8.4%	
San Diego, California	25,201	2.1%	
Cleveland, Ohio	22,978	4.8%	
Sterling Heights, Michigan	21,530	17.35%	
Houston, Texas	19,290	1%	
Detroit, Michigan	18,992	2.0%	
Omaha, Nebraska	18,447	3.8%	
Baltimore, Maryland	18,400	2.8%	
Parma, Ohio	15,503	18.1%	
Grand Rapids, Michigan	15,442	7.8%	
Amherst, New York	15,136	13%	
Erie, Pennsylvania	14,718	14.2%	
San Antonio, Texas	14,475	1.3%	
San Francisco, California	14,332	1.8%	
New Britain, Connecticut	14,257	19.9%	
West Seneca, New York	14,236	31%	
Boston, Massachusetts	13,704	2.3%	
Seattle, Washington	12,622	2.2%	
Las Vegas, Nevada	12,188	2.5%	
South Bend, Indiana	11,417	10.7%	
Scranton, Pennsylvania	11,311	14.8%	
Jacksonville, Florida	10,500	1.4%	

== Ranked by percentage ==
The following communities have more than 30% of the population as being of Polish ancestry, based on data extracted from the United States Census, 2000, for communities with more than 1,000 individuals identifying their ancestry (in descending order by percentage of population):

- Pulawski Township, Michigan 65.7%
- Posen Township, Michigan 65.4%
  - Posen, Michigan 56.1%
- Sharon, Wisconsin 53.7%
- Bevent, Wisconsin 52.7%
- Sloan, New York 46.8%
- Dupont, Pennsylvania 46.6%
- Wallington, New Jersey 45.5%
- Alban, Wisconsin 44.7%
- Independence, Wisconsin 43.7%
- Linwood, Wisconsin 43.1%
- Stockton, Wisconsin 42.9%
- Swan River, Minnesota (Sobieski, Minnesota) 41.5%
- Nanticoke, Pennsylvania 41.2%
- Alberta, Minnesota 39.8%
- Newport, Pennsylvania 37.1%
- Reid, Wisconsin 37.0%
- Arcadia, Wisconsin 36.7%
- Lincoln, Michigan 36.2%
- Glen Lyon, Pennsylvania 35.1%
- Minto, North Dakota 34.8%
- Hull, Wisconsin 34.4%
- Bingham, Michigan 34.1%
- Maple Grove, Wisconsin 33.8%
- Carson, Wisconsin 33.7%
- Ubly, Michigan 33.6%
- Duryea, Pennsylvania 32.8%
- Dickson City, Pennsylvania 32.6%
- Shenandoah, Pennsylvania 32.6%
- Harwood Heights, Illinois 32.5%
- Dwight, Michigan 32.1%
- Kulpmont, Pennsylvania 32.1%
- Loup City, Nebraska 31.8%
- Pulaski, Wisconsin 31.7%
- Cheektowaga, New York 31.6%
- Depew, New York 31.2%
- Holding, Minnesota 30.9%
- Filer, Michigan 30.8%
- Angelica, Wisconsin 30.7%
- Whiting, Wisconsin 30.7%
- Pike Creek, Minnesota 30.6%
- Buena Vista, Wisconsin 30.3%
- Burbank, Illinois 30.3%
- New York Mills, New York 30.3%
- Rietbrock, Wisconsin 30.2%

== See also ==
- Lists of United States cities with large ethnic minority populations
