= Waikele, Hawaii =

Census-designated place in Hawaii, Honolulu

Waikele
- Census-designated place
- Location within Oahu Location within Hawaii
- Coordinates: 21°24′9″N 158°0′20″W
- County: Honolulu
- State: Hawaii
- Country: United States

Area
  - Total: 1.10 sq mi (2.85 km^{2})
  - Land: 1.10 sq mi (2.85 km^{2})
  - Water: 0 sq mi (0.00 km^{2})
- Elevation: 220 ft (67 m)

Population (2020)
  - Total: 7,509
  - Density: 6,824.0/sq mi (2,634.75/km^{2})
- Time zone: UTC-10 (Hawaii-Aleutian)
- ZIP code: 96797
- Area code: 808
- FIPS code: 15-76250

Waikele (Hawaiian pronunciation: [vɐjˈkɛlɛ]) is a census-designated place (CDP) in Honolulu County, Hawaii, United States. As of the 2020 census, the CDP population was 7,509. Residents use Waipahu, Hawaii for their postal city.

== Geography ==
Waikele is located at 21°24′9″N 158°0′20″W (21.4025524, -158.0058055). According to the United States Census Bureau, the CDP has a total area of 1.1 square miles (2.8 km^{2}), all of it land.

== Demographics ==
Historical population
Census	Pop.	Note	%±
2020	7,509		—
U.S. Decennial Census

=== 2020 census ===
As of the 2020 census, Waikele had a population of 7,509. The median age was 40.9 years. 18.9% of residents were under the age of 18 and 13.7% of residents were 65 years of age or older. For every 100 females there were 99.0 males, and for every 100 females age 18 and over there were 98.5 males age 18 and over.

100.0% of residents lived in urban areas, while 0.0% lived in rural areas.

There were 2,899 households in Waikele, of which 31.2% had children under the age of 18 living in them. Of all households, 56.7% were married-couple households, 15.6% were households with a male householder and no spouse or partner present, and 19.8% were households with a female householder and no spouse or partner present. About 19.1% of all households were made up of individuals and 6.0% had someone living alone who was 65 years of age or older.

There were 2,992 housing units, of which 3.1% were vacant. The homeowner vacancy rate was 0.4% and the rental vacancy rate was 3.9%.

Racial composition as of the 2020 census
Race	Number	Percent
White	898	12.0%
Black or African American	171	2.3%
American Indian and Alaska Native	6	0.1%
Asian	4,126	54.9%
Native Hawaiian and Other Pacific Islander	295	3.9%
Some other race	140	1.9%
Two or more races	1,873	24.9%
Hispanic or Latino (of any race)	659	8.8%

== Education ==
Hawaii Department of Education operates public schools. Waikele Elementary School is in Waikele CDP.
