= Village Park, Hawaii =

- Former CDP
- Location in Honolulu County and the state of Hawaii
- Coordinates: 21°23′48″N 158°1′46″W
- Country: United States
- State: Hawaii

Area
  - Total: 0.93 sq mi (2.4 km^{2})
  - Land: 0.93 sq mi (2.4 km^{2})
  - Water: 0 sq mi (0.0 km^{2})
- Elevation: 331 ft (101 m)

Population (2000)
  - Total: 9,625
  - Density: 10,490/sq mi (4,050.2/km^{2})
- Time zone: UTC-10 (Hawaii-Aleutian)
- Area code: 808
- FIPS code: 15-72255
- GNIS feature ID: 1867262

Village Park was a census-designated place (CDP) in Honolulu County, Hawaiʻi, United States. The population was 9,625 at the 2000 census. For the 2010 census, it was replaced by the Royal Kunia CDP.

== Geography ==
Village Park is located at 21°23′48″N 158°1′46″W (21.396719, -158.029444).

According to the United States Census Bureau, the CDP had a total area of 0.9 square miles (2.3 km^{2}), all of it land.

== Demographics ==
As of the census of 2000, there were 9,625 people, 2,628 households, and 2,281 families residing in the CDP. The population density was 10,490.0 inhabitants per square mile (4,050.2/km^{2}). There were 2,776 housing units at an average density of 3,025.5 units per square mile (1,168.2 units/km^{2}). The racial makeup of the CDP was 9.36% White, 2.24% African American, 0.25% Native American, 57.90% Asian, 7.57% Pacific Islander, 1.22% from other races, and 21.45% from two or more races. Hispanic or Latino of any race were 7.09% of the population.

There were 2,628 households, out of which 49.8% had children under the age of 18 living with them, 70.9% were married couples living together, 10.5% had a female householder with no husband present, and 13.2% were non-families. 8.3% of all households were made up of individuals, and 0.5% had someone living alone who was 65 years of age or older. The average household size was 3.66 and the average family size was 3.87.

In the CDP the population was spread out, with 30.4% under the age of 18, 10.1% from 18 to 24, 32.3% from 25 to 44, 21.9% from 45 to 64, and 5.3% who were 65 years of age or older. The median age was 31 years. For every 100 females, there were 101.1 males. For every 100 females age 18 and over, there were 97.7 males.

The median income for a household in the CDP was $70,302, and the median income for a family was $72,422. Males had a median income of $35,317 versus $25,610 for females. The per capita income for the CDP was $19,579. About 3.4% of families and 5.0% of the population were below the poverty line, including 6.5% of those under age 18 and 1.7% of those age 65 or over.

== Education ==
Hawaii Department of Education operates public schools. Kale'iopu'u Elementary School is in the former Village Park CDP.
