= List of U.S. cities with large Japanese-American populations =

The list includes Issei (一世, "first generation") Japanese-born immigrants from Japan, and those who are multigenerational Japanese Americans. Cities considered to have significant Japanese American populations are large U.S. cities or municipalities with a critical mass of at least 1.0% of the total urban population; medium-sized cities with a critical mass of at least 2.0% of the total population; smaller communities in the continental United States with a critical mass of at least 2.5% of the total population; and smaller communities in Hawaii with a critical mass of at least 10.0% of the total population.

There are about 773,714 Japanese Americans, as of 2018, with that number rising to 1.6 million when including individuals of partial Japanese descent.

The two metropolitan areas with the highest Japanese populations according to the 2010 Census, were Greater Honolulu Combined Statistical Area (149,700), and the Greater Los Angeles Combined Statistical Area (134,600).

== Large cities ==
The list of large cities (population greater than 250,000) with a Japanese American population in excess of 1.0% of the total population.

Rank	City	State	Japanese-Americans	Percentage
1	Honolulu	Hawaii	86,612	23.3%
2	Sacramento	California	6,642	1.6%
3	Seattle	Washington	8,979	1.6%
4	San Francisco	California	11,410	1.5%
5	San Jose	California	11,484	1.5%
6	Los Angeles	California	36,992	1.0%

== Medium-size cities ==
List of medium-sized cities (population between 100,000 and 250,000) with a Japanese American population of at least 2.0% of the total population.

Rank	City	State	Japanese-Americans	Percentage
1	Torrance	California	13,991	10.1%
2	Irvine	California	5,088	3.6%
3	Sunnyvale	California	3,606	2.7%
4	Bellevue	Washington	2,838	2.6%
5	Berkeley	California	2,312	2.3%

== Smaller communities in the continental United States ==
List of places in the continental United States with a population fewer than 100,000 and a Japanese American population of at least 2.5% of the total population.

Rank	City	State	Japanese-Americans	Percentage
1	Gardena	California	6,712	11.6%
2	Rancho Palos Verdes	California	3,268	7.9%
3	Rolling Hills Estates	California	598	7.8%
4	Monterey Park	California	4,433	7.4%
5	Edgewater	New Jersey	574	4.7%
6	Cupertino	California	2,331	4.6%
7	Novi	Michigan	2,666	4.5%
8	Palos Verdes Estates	California	588	4.4%
9	Rye	New York	578	3.9%
10	Cerritos	California	1,671	3.2%
11	Newcastle	Washington	300	2.9%
12	Lomita	California	542	2.7%
13	Mercer Island	Washington	582	2.6%
14	Los Altos	California	717	2.6%
15	Redondo Beach	California	1,618	2.6%
16	Dublin	Ohio	1,071	2.6%

== Smaller communities in Hawaii ==
List of places in Hawaii with a population fewer than 100,000 and a Japanese American population of at least 10.0% of the total population.

Rank	City	State	Japanese-Americans	Percentage
1	Aiea	Hawaii	2,877	31.9%
2	Pearl City	Hawaii	9,621	31.1%
3	Waimalu	Hawaii	8,473	28.8%
4	Hilo	Hawaii	10,863	26.7%
5	Mililani Town	Hawaii	7,126	24.9%
6	Kaneohe	Hawaii	8,259	23.6%
7	Waipio	Hawaii	2,734	23.4%
8	Wailuku	Hawaii	2,799	22.8%
9	Wahiawa	Hawaii	3,342	20.7%
10	Halawa	Hawaii	2,802	20.2%
11	Waipahu	Hawaii	3,481	10.5%
12	Kapaa	Hawaii	965	10.2%
