= Hawaiian flagtail =

Species of fish in the genus Kuhlia found in the Hawaiian Islands

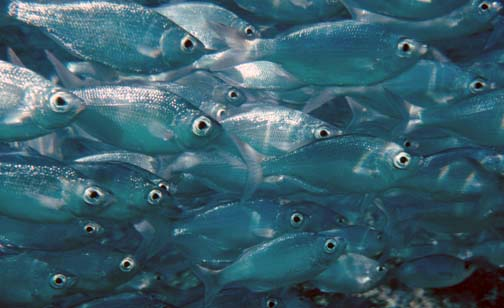
Reticulated flagtail, Kuhlia sandvicensis

The Hawaiian flagtails are species of the genus of flagtail fishes found in the Hawaiian Islands. Two species are Kuhlia sandvicensis and K. xenura. K. xenura is endemic to the islands.

In the Hawaiian language, āholehole refers to the young stage, and āhole the mature fish. It was sometimes called puaʻa kai, literally "sea pig". Keāhole Point and the Kona International Airport located there are named for the fish. Waiʻahole Valley on Oʻahu is named after the fish as well, where the ocean and the Waiʻahole River meet there are many fish there.
