= Manta ray night dive =

Ecotourism diving experience

A manta ray night dive is nighttime excursion to view manta rays and can be done by either scuba diving or snorkeling. One of the most famous sites for manta ray night dives is in Hawaii, where divers and snorkelers can observe manta rays during their nocturnal feeding in their natural habitat. May is cited as the month with the best diving conditions, on Kona and the Big Island of Hawaii.

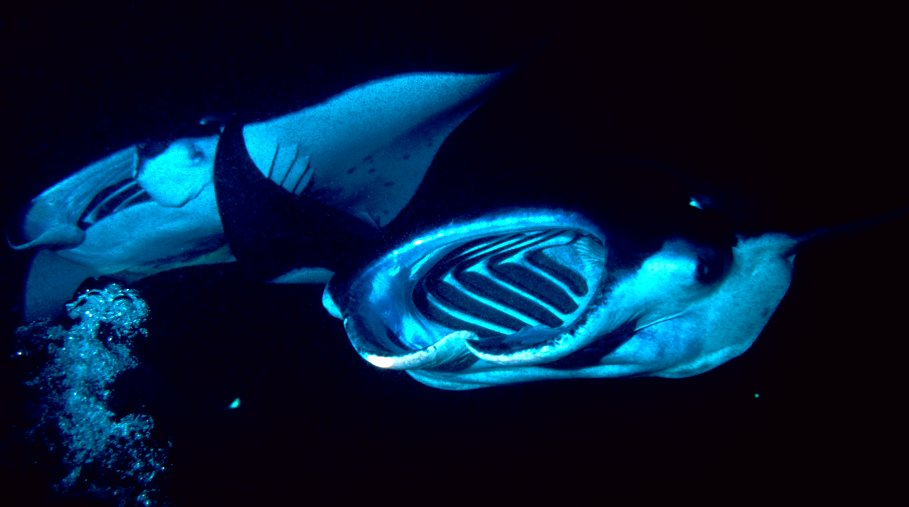
Two manta rays feeding at night

== Description ==
Depending on the amount of microscopic plankton present, the number of manta rays will vary. Some days no manta rays are seen while on days with high plankton levels upwards of a dozen may be present. While diving, scuba divers shine lights up - known as "bonfire" or "campfire" diving - while snorkelers shine them down creating a column of light which attracts millions of minuscule plankton, which in turn attracts the manta rays.

A popular site is just off the coast of Hawaiʻi Island called Garden Eel Cove, as well as the Kona Surf Hotel. Located just off the coast of Keahole Point (near the Kona International Airport), it attracts scuba divers for the abundance of manta rays. Its official name is Hoʻona Bay, at 19°43′58″N 156°3′26″W. Other sea life includes garden eels, Hawaiian turkeyfish, and Heller's barracuda.

While Manta ray diving tours on Hawaii occur year-round and are not limited by seasons, the Professional Association of Diving Instructors (PADI) cites May through September as the peak months for manta ray night dives.

== History ==
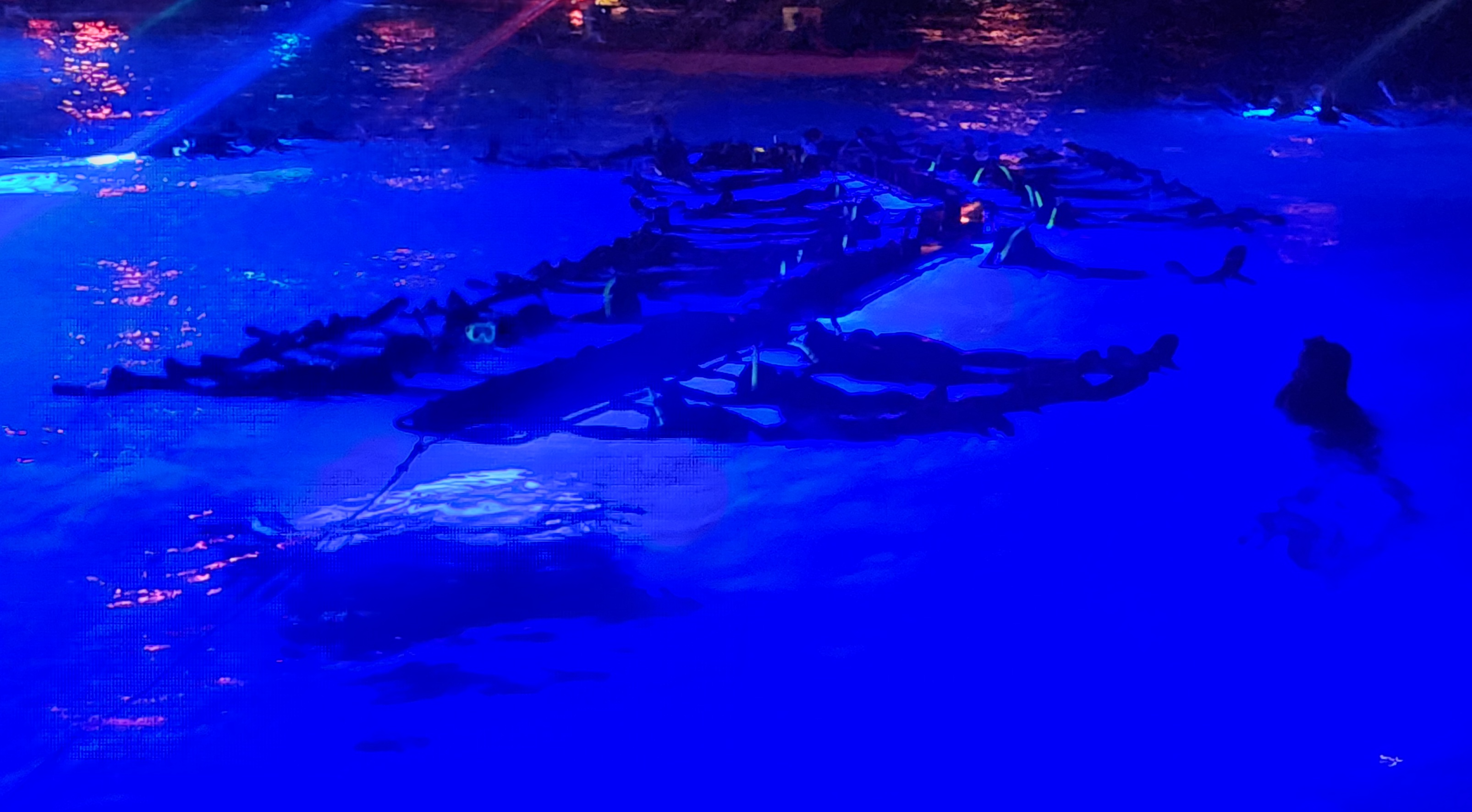
A group of divers floats holding onto a lighted raft, which attracts plankton and thus manta rays (foreground), on the Big Island, Hawaii, at Keauhou Bay.

For decades travelers to Hawaii observed manta rays from restaurants and hotels along the coast, such as the Mauna Kea Beach Hotel and the Outrigger Kona Resort. In 1992, dive operators began occasionally taking scuba divers to areas such as the Kona Surf Hotel for manta ray encounters. The frequency of these dive trips increased over the years with many dive operations offering trips most days.

Travel guides often rate this dive highly. PADI says that "dive magazines the world over consistently rank Kona's manta ray night diving as one of the best things you can do underwater."

In 2017, the 3 most popular sites to do the manta ray night dive on the Island of Hawaiʻi are (from south to north): in front of the Sheraton Kona Resort & Spa at Keauhou Bay (formerly known as the Kona Surf Hotel, the dive spot is called 'Manta Village'), in front of the Kona International Airport at Keahole, Hawaii (also called 'Garden Eel Cove' or 'Manta Heaven'), and between Kawaihae harbor and the Kohala resorts.

== Conservation and the Manta Pacific Research Foundation ==
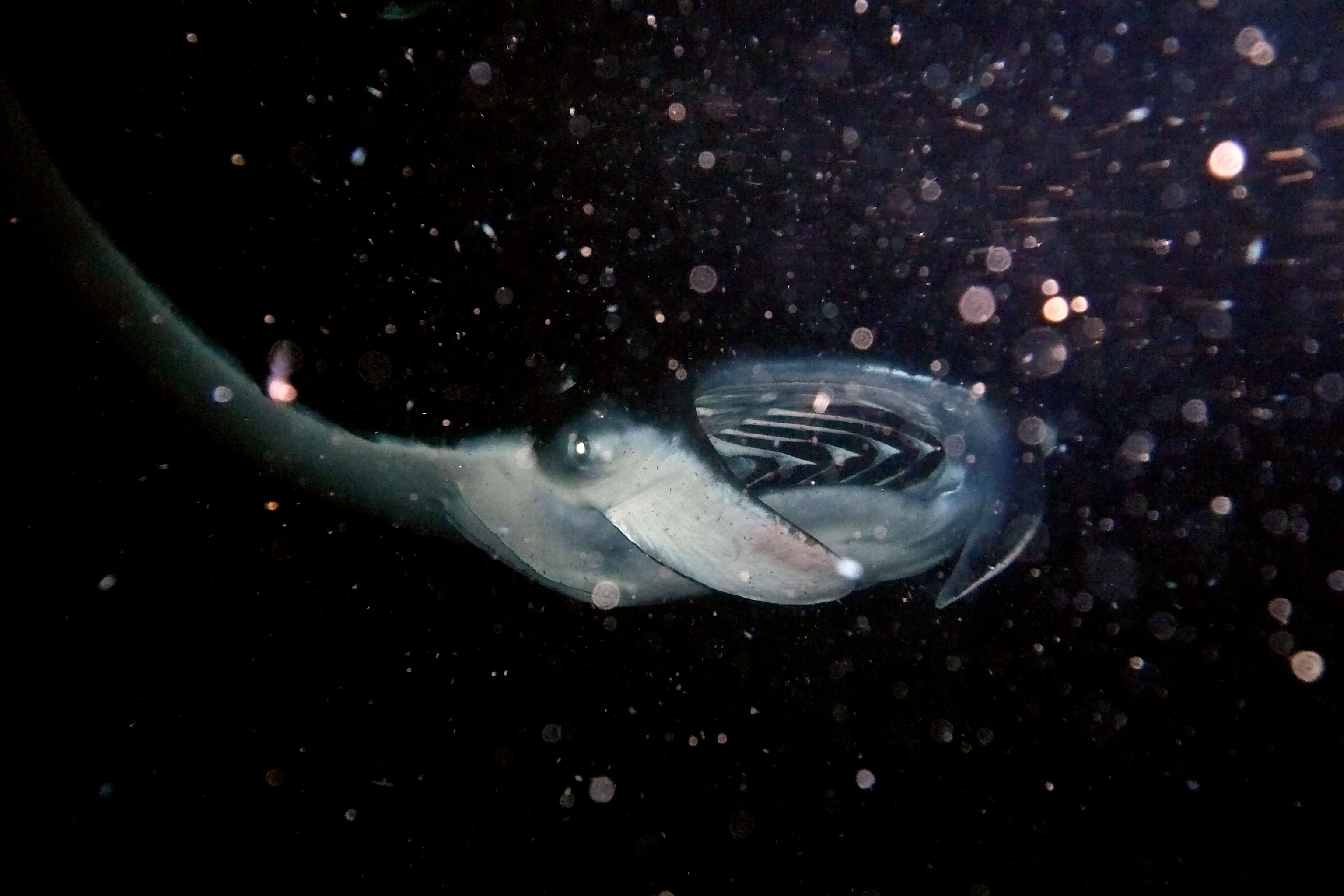
Manta birostris feeding

With the increasing popularity of this dive, the conservation and protection of manta rays has become a priority for dive operators and organizations. Manta rays in other parts of the Pacific Ocean have been hunted by fishermen as a result of the increasing demand for manta ray gill plates. Local organizations, such as the Manta Pacific Research Foundation, try to protect the local manta rays and educate the public about manta rays and other sea life. The Manta Pacific Research Foundation's mission is to "study manta rays in their natural habitat, conduct scientific research, provide education programs for the public about manta rays and the marine environment, and to establish and promote global manta ray conservation." As a result of manta rays' fragile biological composition, guidelines to protect the health of the manta rays at this dive have been set forth by The Ocean Recreation council of Hawaii and PADI's Project AWARE. The guidelines are strictly enforced by dive operations that conduct the dive in Kona.
