= Kona Man O'Wars =

- 1997; Kailua-Kona, Hawaii

Minor league affiliations
- Class: Winter Baseball
- League: Hawaii Winter Baseball (1997)

Major league affiliations
- Team: None

Minor league titles
- League titles (0): None

Team data
- Name: Kona Man O'Wars (1997)
- Ballpark: Old Kona Airport Field (1997)

The Kona Man O'Wars were a planned expansion Hawaii Winter Baseball team based in Kailua-Kona, Hawaii. The Kona Man O'Wars franchise folded just before the beginning of the 1996–1997 winter league season.

== History ==
In August, 1996, during the Hawaii Winter Baseball conference at the Japanese Cultural Center of Hawaii, league officials announced the Kona Man O'Wars and Kaneohe Bay Dawgs as expansion franchises into the Hawaii Winter Baseball league. The two franchises were planned to begin play as members of the 1996–1997 Hawaii Winter Baseball League, expanding the league to six teams. The two expansion franchises were added because of increased interest from Major League Baseball and the Japanese and Korean pro leagues to send players to the Hawaii developmental league. With the expansion teams added, the league teams were scheduled to play a 54–game schedule.

After the Kaneohe franchise announcement was rescinded in October, the Kona Man O'Wars franchise also did not proceed to play in the upcoming season, with league play scheduled to begin on October 11, 1996. When the Kanehoe franchise folded, Kona was still in the league plans. "We know that the Kona Man O'Wars will have great community support just from the ticket sales for our Nov. 1-3 series between Hilo and Honolulu in Kona." said Ruben Chappins, a league official, in regards to the future of the Kona franchise. Kona eventually folding was reportedly due to the league needing both expansion teams for schedule balance.

The Hawaii Winter Baseball league folded after the 1997 winter season with the Hilo Stars, Honolulu Sharks, Maui Stingrays and West Oahu CaneFires playing the season as the remaining members.

== The ballpark ==
The Kona Man O Wars were scheduled to play home games at the Old Kona Airport Field.

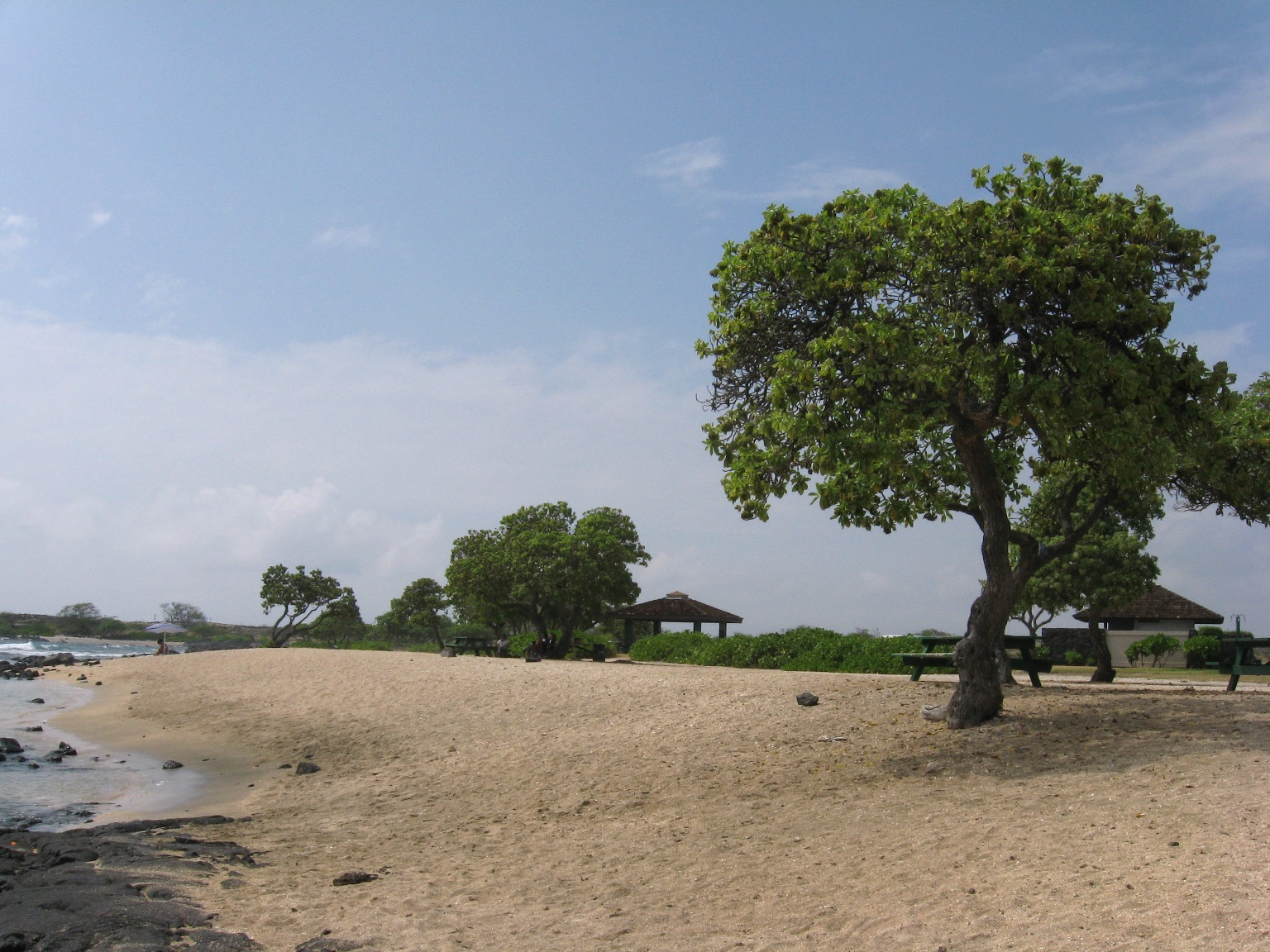
(2009) Old Kona Airport Beach. Kailua-Kona, Hawaii

== Timeline ==
Year(s)	# Yrs.	Team	Level	League
1997	1	Kona Man O'Wars	Winter Baseball	Hawaii Winter Baseball

== Notable alumni ==
- There was no roster formed for the 1997 Kona Man O'Wars.
