= Russell Keller Laros =

American industrialist, innovator, and philanthropist

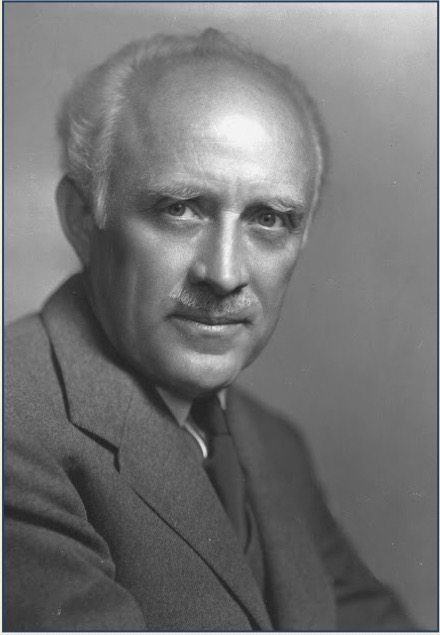
- Born: 29 June 1893; Easton, Pennsylvania, United States
- Died: 12 November 1955 (aged 60); Bethlehem, Pennsylvania, United States
- Occupations: Industrialist, innovator, and philanthropist
- Known for: Founder of R.K. Laros Textile Co., multimillionaire and benefactor
- Spouse: Helen Kostenbader
- Children: 5

Russell Keller Laros (June 29, 1893 - November 12, 1955) was an American industrialist, innovator, and philanthropist who founded the R.K. Laros Textile Co.

== Biography ==
Born in Easton, Pennsylvania, Russell Keller Laros founded the R. K. Laros Silk Company in 1919 and the Laros Textile Company in 1933.

The R. K. Laros Silk Company became one of the top silk manufacturers in the country at the time and went on to produce silk lingerie fashions of the early to mid-20th century. At its peak, the R.K. Laros Silk Company was the largest thrower of silk in the country, employed more than 2,000 people and used more Japanese silk than any other company in the world. At the time, it was said that one out of every 12 pairs of silk stockings came from Laros, and the Laros data book became the go-to handbook for the silk throwing industry.

The Laros Textile Company manufactured and sold fine underthings known for style and smartness, as well as utility and service. Laros was the first slip manufacturer to acknowledge that the feminine figure is not uniformly proportional. One notable resultant Laros invention was the 1938 patented Dimensional Slip, designed to fit any female body type. Laros went on to sell eight million units in United States, and Laros garments were sold in high-end retailers in the United States, including Saks, Lord & Taylor, Marshall Field, Neiman Marcus, and Burdines.

In the 1940s and 50s, Laros hired fashion designer Helen Hunt Bencker and artist John La Gatta to design the finest lingerie and market it to glamorous women around the world.

Laros patents included a thread cleaning attachment for winding (1936) [US2065991A]; the no-ride slip [US2271749], a sheerness meter for measuring sheerness with respect to material, production, and color (1941) [US2231953A]; a nylon thread designed to refract rather than reflect light to create non-glossy stockings [US2668430A], among others.

Both the R.K. Laros Silk Company and the Laros Textiles company continued operating separately until the “silk freeze” in 1941 stopped the supply of silk for the throwing industry, and the R.K. Laros Silk Company ceased operation.

Later, as the silk industry moved into nylon, Laros worked with Du Pont engineers to help them integrate the new product.

During World War II, The Laros Textile Company shifted production from hosiery to fragmentation parachutes. In 1942, the Army contracted Laros to sew 50,000 M-26 flare parachutes. In 1943, Laros received a contract for 73,000 M-40 bomb parachutes. Laros also produced Army hospital pajamas, Navy signal flags, and pennants.

In 1952, under a government contract, the R.K. Laros Textile Co. became one of three companies in the United States to manufacture Plavolex, a synthetic blood fortifier. Plavolex was used heavily on the front lines of the Korean war.

The Laros family sold Laros Inc. to Warner’s in 1957, and the companies merged in 1960.

== Philanthropy ==
The Laros name lives on with The Helen and R.K. Laros Foundation, a non-profit charitable trust started by Russell K. Laros and his wife, Helen. The Foundation supports projects pertaining to art and culture, education, environment, and health and human services in Bethlehem, PA. Members of the Board of Trustees include a mix of Bethlehem community members and Laros Family members, including Laura Bennett Shelton, grand daughter-in-law of Russell K. Laros and wife of Laros grandson, the late Peter Laros Shelton (17), and Russell Keller Laros III.
