= Kalaoa, Hawaii =

Census-designated place in Hawaii, U.S.

Kalaoa
- Census-designated place
- Location in Hawaii County and the state of Hawaii
- Coordinates: 19°43′23″N 156°0′17″W
- Country: United States
- State: Hawaii
- County: Hawaii

Area
  - Total: 45.6 sq mi (118.1 km^{2})
  - Land: 39.2 sq mi (101.4 km^{2})
  - Water: 6.4 sq mi (16.7 km^{2})
- Elevation: 680 ft (210 m)

Population (2010)
  - Total: 9,644
  - Density: 246/sq mi (95.1/km^{2})
- Time zone: UTC-10 (Hawaii-Aleutian)
- Area code: 808
- FIPS code: 15-25400
- GNIS feature ID: 2414061

Kalaoa is an unincorporated community and former census-designated place (CDP) in Hawaiʻi County, Hawaiʻi, United States. The population was 9,644 as of the 2010 census, up from 6,794 residents at the 2000 census.

In the 2020 U.S. Census the area taken by Kalaoa CDP was now in the Kaiminani CDP.

== Geography ==
Kalaoa is located on the west side of the island of Hawaii at 19°43′23″N 156°0′17″W (19.722969, -156.004669). It is bordered to the south by Kailua-Kona, and Waimea is 33 miles (53 km) to the northeast. Kalaoa sits on the lower western slopes of the Hualalai volcano and extends west to the Pacific Ocean.

According to the United States Census Bureau, the former CDP had a total area of 45.6 square miles (118.1 km^{2}), of which 39.2 square miles (101.4 km^{2}) were land and 6.4 square miles (16.7 km^{2}), or 14.13%, are water.

== Demographics ==
=== 2000 Census data ===
Historical population
Census	Pop.	Note	%±
1990	4,490		—
2000	6,794		51.3%
2010	9,644		41.9%
2020	11,729		21.6%

At the 2000 census there were 6,794 people, 2,402 households, and 1,724 families. The population density was 172.1 inhabitants per square mile (66.4/km^{2}). There were 2,541 housing units at an average density of 64.4 per square mile (24.9/km^{2}). The racial makeup of the CDP was 49.34% White, 0.35% African American, 0.52% Native American, 13.39% Asian, 10.35% Pacific Islander, 0.78% from other races, and 25.27% from two or more races. Hispanic or Latino of any race were 5.95%.

Of the 2,402 households 34.6% had children under the age of 18 living with them, 57.8% were married couples living together, 9.7% had a female householder with no husband present, and 28.2% were non-families. 19.4% of households were one person and 3.7% were one person aged 65 or older. The average household size was 2.83 and the average family size was 3.19.

The age distribution was 25.5% under the age of 18, 6.8% from 18 to 24, 29.5% from 25 to 44, 29.3% from 45 to 64, and 8.9% 65 or older. The median age was 39 years. For every 100 females, there were 102.5 males. For every 100 females age 18 and over, there were 101.2 males.

The median household income was $53,024 and the median family income was $56,461. Males had a median income of $35,082 versus $27,130 for females. The per capita income was $24,179. About 3.0% of families and 6.2% of the population were below the poverty line, including 7.2% of those under age 18 and 5.1% of those age 65 or over.

== Economy ==
Mokulele Airlines, a small inter-island commuter airline, is headquartered in the CDP, on the grounds of Keahole at Kona Int'l Airport.

== Transportation ==
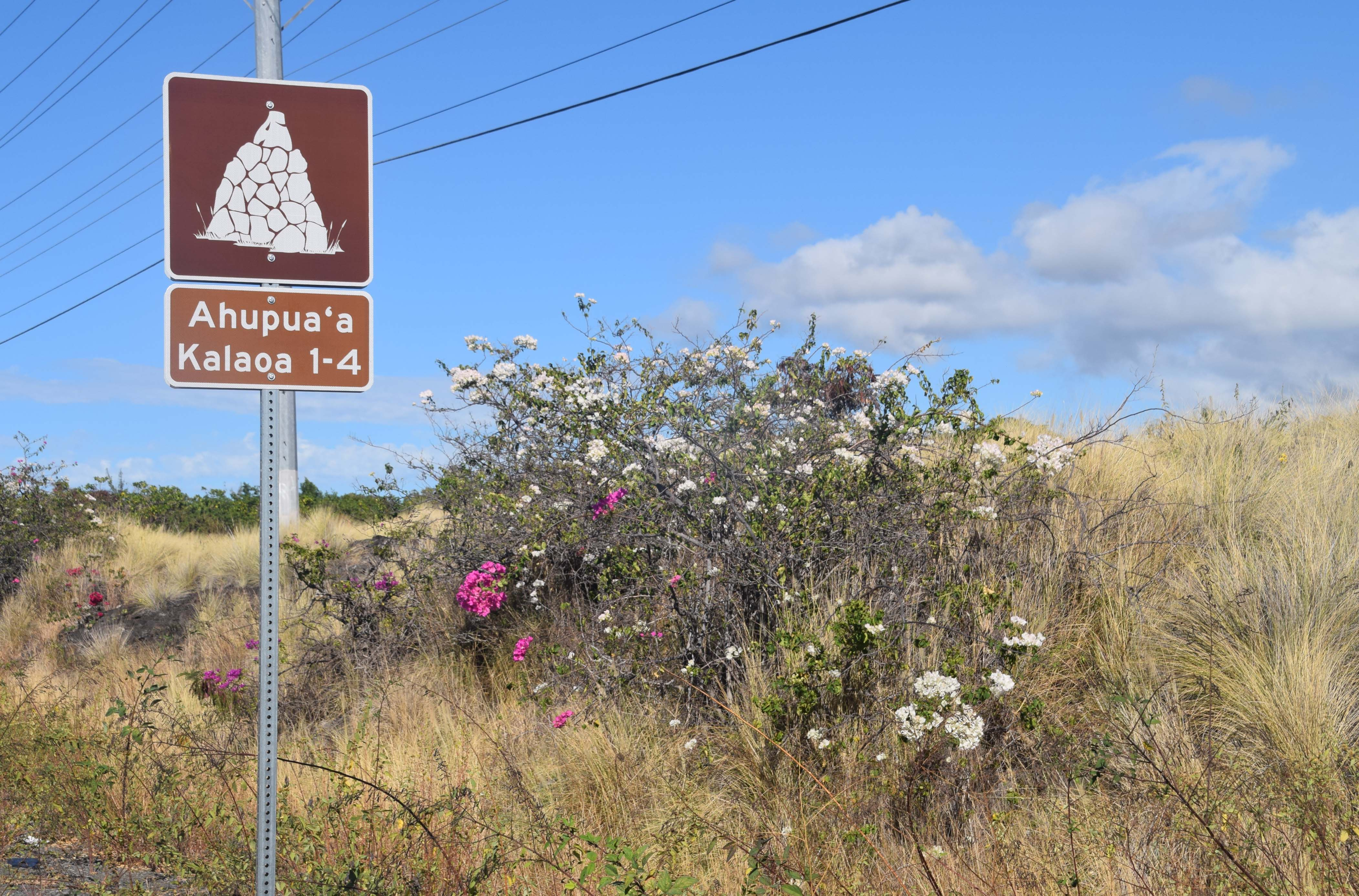
A Kalaoa road sign on Hawaii Route 19, Kona District, Hawaii, between the 93 mile marker and Kaiminani Dr.

Keahole at Kona International Airport is located in the former area of the Kalaoa CDP, and a newspaper article described Kalaoa as mauka of the airport.

It serves the western side of the Big Island, including Kailua-Kona, Holualoa, Keauhou, Captain Cook, Waikoloa, Waimea, and the Kohala Coast.

The Kalaoa area is served by two major highways: the upper and lower routes of Hawaii Belt Road. The upper section is known as Mamalahoa Highway/Route 190, and the lower, more utilized coastal route, is known as Queen Ka'ahumanu Highway, but it is also known by its nickname as The Queen K/Route 19.

== Education ==
The school district is the Hawaii Department of Education.

== Points of interest ==
- Keahole Point
- Natural Energy Laboratory of Hawaii
- Kaloko-Honokohau National Historical Park
- Mount Hualalai
