= WHEA (disambiguation) =

WHEA is an acronym for the Windows Hardware Error Architecture. It may also refer to:

- West Hawai'i Explorations Academy
- Women's Hockey East Association, women's league of the Hockey East college ice hockey conference
