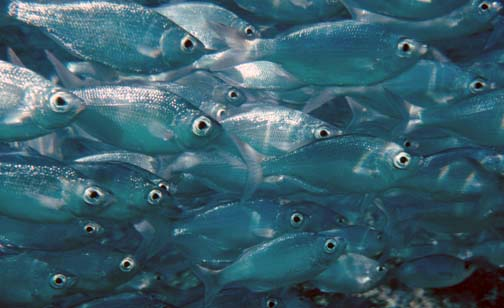

Scientific classification
- Kingdom: Animalia
- Phylum: Chordata
- Class: Actinopterygii
- Order: Centrarchiformes
- Family: Kuhliidae
- Genus: Kuhlia
- Species: K. sandvicensis

Binomial name
- Kuhlia sandvicensis (Steindachner, 1876)

Synonyms
- Moronopsis argenteus sandvicensis Steindachner, 1876; Dules sandvicensis (Steindachner, 1876); Moronopsis sandvicensis (Steindachner, 1876)

= Kuhlia sandvicensis =

Species of fish

Kuhlia sandvicensis, the reticulated flagtail, zebra-headed flagtail or Hawaiian flagtail, is a species of ray-finned fish, a flagtail from the family Kuhliidae which is found in the central Pacific Ocean. It is popular as a game fish and can also be found in the aquarium trade.

== Description ==
Kuhlia sandvicensis has a relatively small eye with a near straight dorsal profile of the head and a strongly forked caudal fin In the anal fin the third spine is slightly longer than the second. They are silvery in colour with a silver and black reticulated pattern on the top of the head and the margin of the caudal fin is blackish. The dorsal fin has 10 spines and 11-12 soft rays while the anal fin has 3 spines and 11-12 soft rays. This species has attained a total length of 25 centimetres (9.8 in).

== Distribution ==
Kuhlia sandvicensis is found in the Pacific Ocean around Hawaii, Pitcairn Island, Tuamotu, Wake Island, Rapa, Society Islands and Kiribati.

== Habitat and biology ==
Kuhlia sandvicensis is common in Hawaii where the young are quite numerous along rocky shores, in tide pools, and in and around the mouths of streams which are connected to the sea. The juveniles are often observed under wharves, in more sizeable tide pools, as well as in both brackish and freshwater ponds, and streams. The adults occur in caves in wave-swept coral reefs, in the surf zone at the base of cliffs and in wrecks. They will infrequently form as schools in more open water. Although this species is found in both marine and freshwater habitats they do not require any time in freshwater to complete their life cycle. They feed on fishes, aquatic invertebrates and insects.

== Taxonomy ==
Kuhlia sandvicensis was thought to be endemic to Hawaii and to be the only species of flagtail present there, but in the 1990s ichthyologists independently noted two species which were separated morphologically and genetically. One had a black and white "zebra pattern" on its head while the other had a plain head. The plain headed species was identified as the previously forgotten Kuhlia xenura, the type of which had been erroneously labelled as being from El Salvador. They also found the zebra-headed flagtail to be widespread in the Pacific and that the plain headed one was the endemic Hawaiian species.

== In Hawaiian culture ==
In Hawaii, the common name is ʻāhole for the mature fish and ʻāholehole for the juvenile. The name is probably derived from the word hole in the Hawaiian language which means "to strip away", since the fish was used to "strip away" evil spirits and as an aphrodisiac. A proverb was, "He ʻāhole ka iʻa, hole ke aloha", meaning roughly "ʻāhole is the fish, but love is restless". It was also sometimes known as puaʻa kai, literally "pig of the sea". European visitors were sometimes called ʻāhole due to their pale skin. Aholehole is an important food fish in the Hawaiian Islands and they were frequently featured in traditional ceremonies by Hawaiian people.

The current location of Kona International Airport, Keāhole Point, is named after this fish, because it was found in this area.
