= Natural Energy Laboratory of Hawaii Authority =

US research laboratory

Coordinates: 19°42′58″N 156°02′01″W

Natural Energy Laboratory of Hawaii Authority (NELHA)
- Established: 1974
- Staff: 26
- Location: Kailua-Kona, Hawaii
- Campus: 870 acres (350 ha)
- Operating agency: State of Hawaii
- Website: www.nelha.org

The Natural Energy Laboratory of Hawaii Authority (NELHA) administers the Hawaii Ocean Science and Technology Park (HOST Park) in the U.S. state of Hawaii. NELHA was founded in 1974. At 870 acres (350 ha), HOST Park is a state-subsidized industrial park for incubator and marginal commercial ventures. Part of the subsidy is provided by writing off tenant debt.NELHA also administers a small site, 4 acres (1.6 ha), in Puna on the eastern side of the Island of Hawaii for geothermal research.

The original mission was for research into the uses of deep ocean water in ocean thermal energy conversion (OTEC) renewable energy production and in aquaculture. It later added research into sustainable uses of natural energy sources such as solar energy. Its administration offices are located in the HOST Park Keahole Point in the North Kona District. The entrance is on the Hawaii Belt Road at coordinates, just south of the Kona International Airport. The main administration office is in the 4 acre research campus at the end of the road along the coastline on Keahole Point.

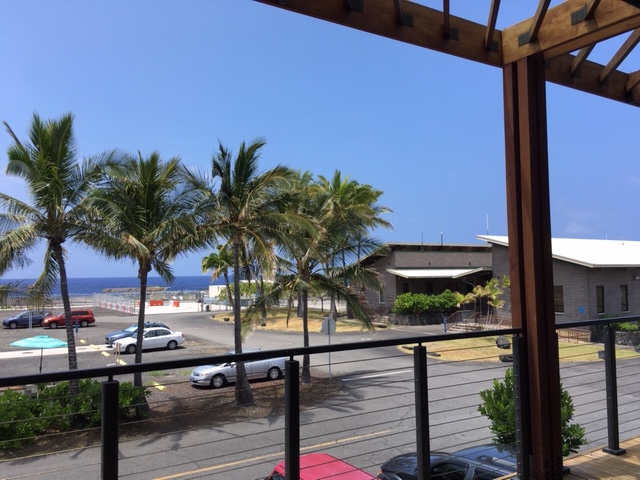
View of the new NELHA Innovation Building

The laboratory was founded in 1974 with 345 acres (140 ha), associated with the University of Hawaii. Large pipelines pump cold sea water from a depth of 3,000 feet (910 m). For three months in 1979, a small amount of electricity was generated. Almost $250M was spent on Ocean thermal energy conversion, but by 1991, the research shifted to other areas. The adjacent Science and Technology Park was merged into the facility, expanding it to 877 acres (355 ha). A neutrino detector was partially constructed in the 1990s called Project DUMAND.

After four decades, NELHA is well on track to fulfilling its mission as an engine for economic development in Hawaii and the economic impact generated by HOST Park is approaching $150M annually with the creation of over 600 jobs statewide. In 2002, 50 acres (20 ha) were leased to a commercial company which filters and bottles the water for sale in Japan. Makai Ocean Engineering, working with Lockheed Martin, restarted OTEC research. Aquaculture, algae biofuel, solar thermal energy, solar concentrating, and wind power are some of the 40 tenants.

== See also ==
- West Hawai'i Explorations Academy, a charter school on the NELHA site
