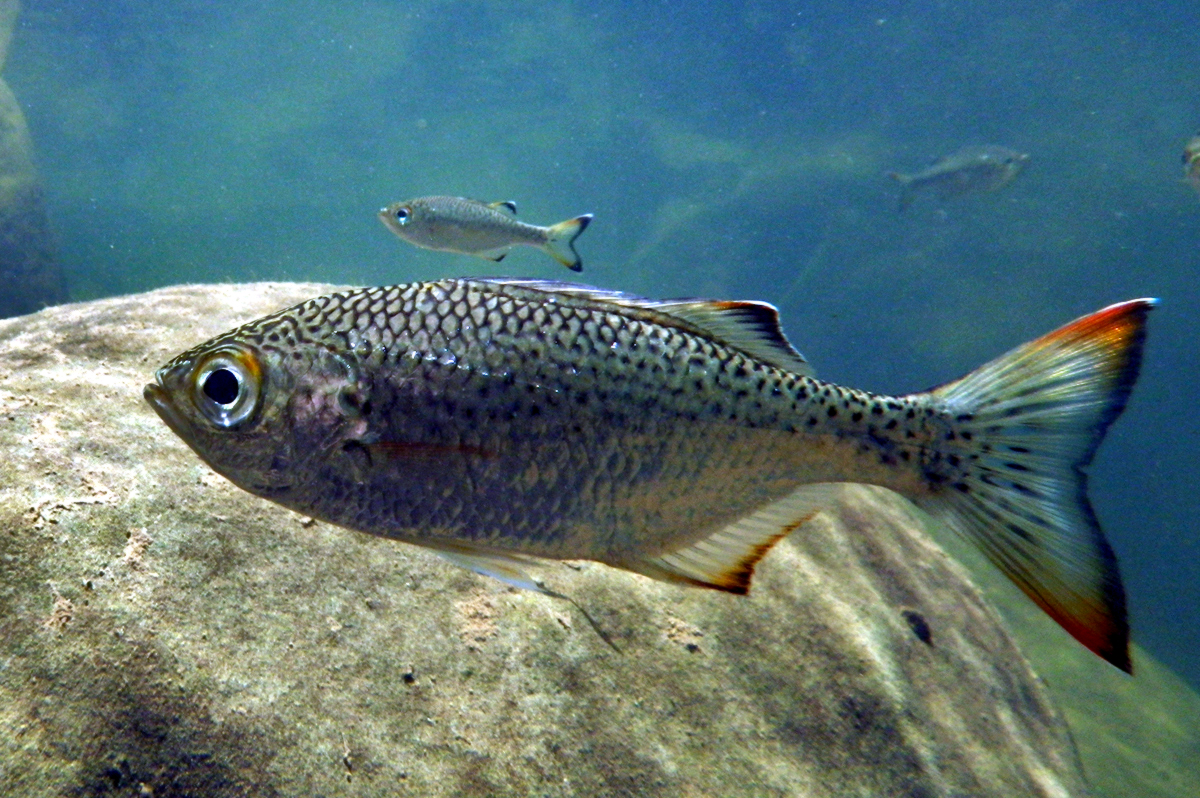

Conservation status
- Least Concern (IUCN 3.1)

Scientific classification
- Kingdom: Animalia
- Phylum: Chordata
- Class: Actinopterygii
- Order: Centrarchiformes
- Family: Kuhliidae
- Genus: Kuhlia
- Species: K. marginata

Binomial name
- Kuhlia marginata (G. Cuvier, 1829)

Synonyms
- Dules marginatus G. Cuvier, 1829; Dules maculatus Valenciennes, 1831; Dules papuensis W. J. Macleay, 1883

= Kuhlia marginata =

Species of fish

Kuhlia marginata, the dark-margined flagtail, spotted flagtail, silver flagtail, orange-finned flagtail, northern jungle perch or mountain bass, is a species of diadromous ray-finned fish, a flagtail from the family Kuhliidae. It is found in eastern Asia and Oceania.

== Description ==
Kuhlia marginata has a moderately deep, compressed body with a moderately pointed head. The large, oblique mouth is protractile with a projecting lower jaw. The mouth extends to just in front of the pupil. It is silvery in colour and is normally marked with dark spots on the posterior, dorsal part of the body and these merge towards the head to form a horizontal dusky band or the dark pigment is concentrated on the edges of the scales. Most of the snout and the tip of the chin are blackish. The caudal fin is pale with a black rear edge which gets wider towards the tips of the lobes, and has a very wide pale submarginal area which frequently has a chevron-shaped blackish band or a row of dusky spots running parallel to the edge. The caudal peduncle is marked with small blackish spots. The margin of the soft-rayed portions of the dorsal and anal fins has a thin white margin and has a broad blackish submarginal zone which gets thinner towards the rear, this is wider on the dorsal fin. There is a distinct patch of red colour on the anal fin and the upper and lower lobes of the tail are pointed. The dorsal fin has 10 spines and 10-12 soft rays while the anal fin has 3 spines and 11-12 soft rays.

== Distribution ==
Kuhlia marginata is a widespread Indo-Pacific specs which occurs from Japan in the north to Australia in the south and east into the central Pacific as far as the Caroline Islands. Its Australian distribution extends from Cape Tribulation to the Russell River in Queensland.

== Habitat and biology ==
Kuhlia marginata spends most of its adult life in freshwater where there are flowing rivers and in pools below waterfalls as far as 64 kilometres (40 miles) upstream. It is frequently recorded in estuarine environments but rarely in the sea. Spawning takes place in the sea and it remains in the sea as a larva and juvenile before migrating up rivers to mature. It cannot get past waterfalls so tends to occur in the lower and mid-catchments of river systems where it prefers steep fast-flowing streams. The juveniles leave the sea for freshwater at around 20 millimetres (0.79 in) in standard length and the females mature at standard length 95.5 millimetres (3.76 in) and males at 83.5 millimetres (3.29 in) when they migrate back to the sea to spawn. Chemical analysis of sample otoliths suggested that many males do not return to freshwater after breeding but females may return to the sea to spawn several times during their lives.
