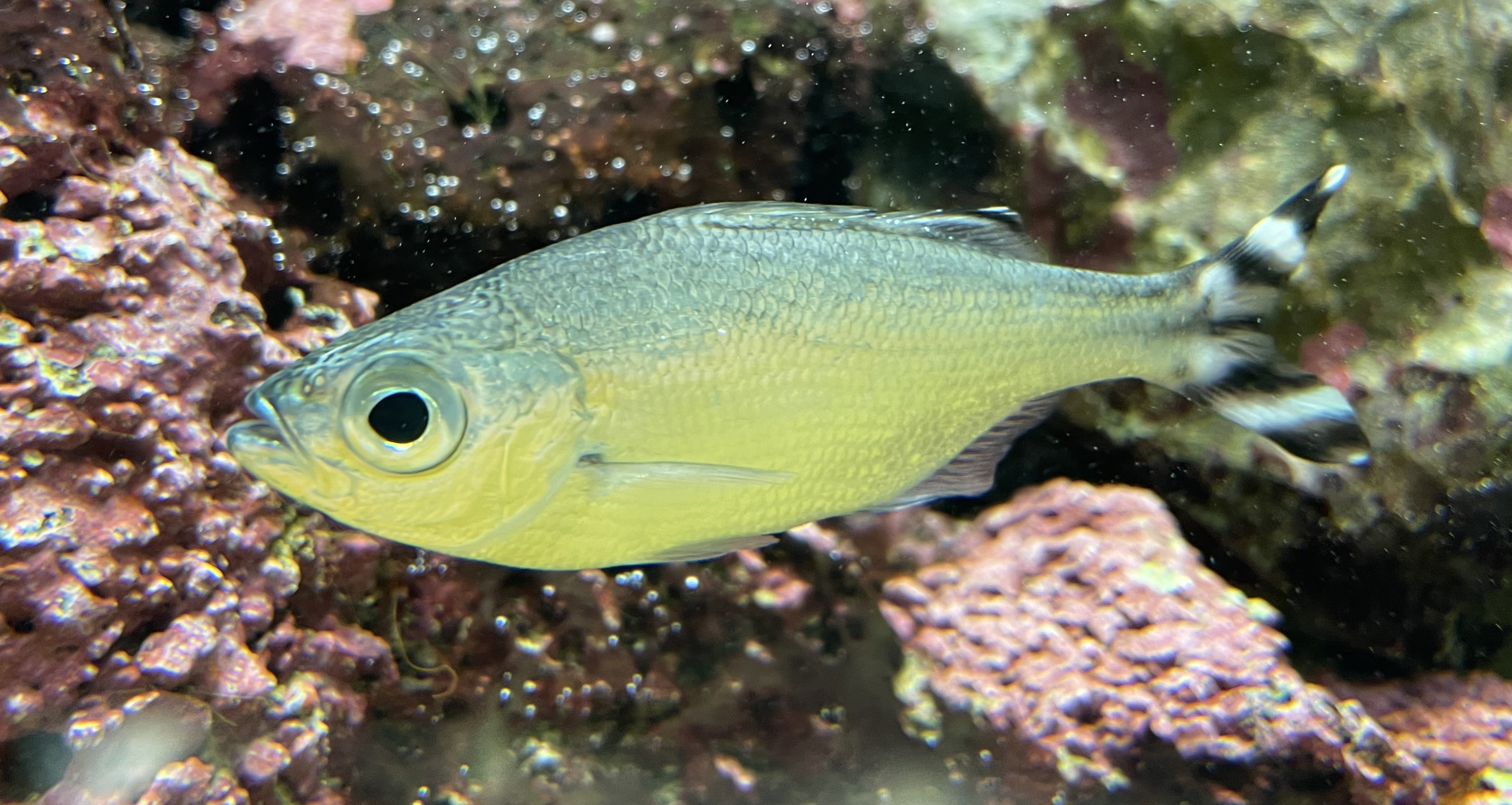
- Kuhlia mugil

Conservation status
- Least Concern (IUCN 3.1)

Scientific classification
- Kingdom: Animalia
- Phylum: Chordata
- Class: Actinopterygii
- Order: Centrarchiformes
- Family: Kuhliidae
- Genus: Kuhlia
- Species: K. mugil

Binomial name
- Kuhlia mugil (J. R. Forster, 1801)

Synonyms
- Sciaena mugil J. R. Forster, 1801; Dules taeniurus G. Cuvier, 1829; Kuhlia taeniura (G. Cuvier, 1829); Perca argentea J. W. Bennett, 1830; Dules argenteus (J. W. Bennett, 1830); Dules bennetti Bleeker, 1853; Kuhlia arge D. S. Jordan & Bollman, 1890; Kuhlia sterneckii Steindachner, 1898; Dules taeniurus malpeloensis Fowler, 1944

= Kuhlia mugil =

Species of fish

Kuhlia mugil, the barred flagtail, the fiveband flagtail or the five-bar flagtail, is a species of marine ray-finned fish, a flagtail belonging to the family Kuhliidae. It is found in the Indo-Pacific region.

== Description ==
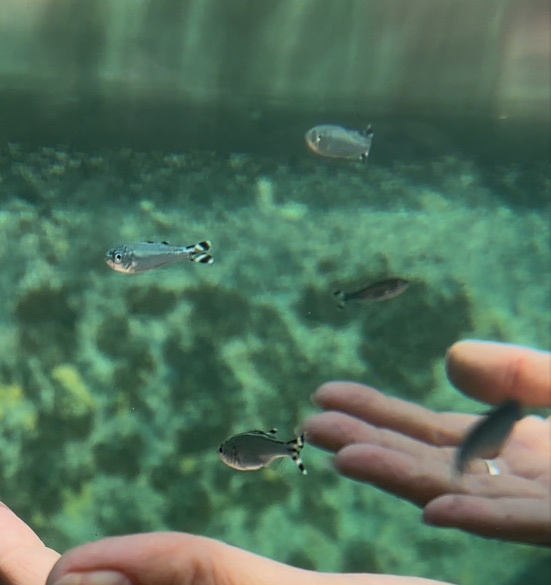
K. mugil in Réunion

Kuhlia mugil has a compressed body which is shaped like an elongated oval with a large eye and an oblique mouth which has a projecting lower jaw. It is covered with moderately large ctenoid scales. It is normally silver in colour, although the upper flanks sometimes show a bluish, brownish or yellowish tinge. The caudal fin has a pattern of five dark bars alternating with paler areas. There is a dusky band along the margin of the soft rayed portion of the dorsal fin except for a white tip on the highest anterior part. The tip of the snout and the tip of the chain are blackish. The dorsal fin is deeply notched. There are 10 spines and 10–11 soft rays in the dorsal fin with 3 spines and 10–12 soft rays in the anal fin. It can attain a standard length of 40 centimetres (16 in).

== Distribution ==
Kuhlia mugil has a widespread distribution which encompasses the Indian Ocean and the Pacific Ocean. It is found from the Red Sea and the east African coast east through the Indo-Pacific to the eastern Pacific islands of Clipperton, Cocos and Revillagigedo. The range extends north to southern Japan, and south to Australia. In Australia the range extends from the Torres Strait to Seal Rocks, New South Wales as well as Lord Howe Island and Norfolk Island in the Tasman Sea and the Cocos (Keeling) Islands and Christmas Island in the Indian Ocean. In the eastern Pacific they are found at the tip of Baja California and along the coast from Costa Rica to Colombia. The species is absent from the Marquesas, Hawaii and Easter Island, Pitcairn Island, and Johnston Island.

== Habitat and biology ==
This species occurs on reefs at depths of 3 to 18 m (9.8 to 59.1 ft), where they form tightly packed schools. Young fish can also be found in tide pools. This species has also been reported occasionally from estuaries but never from fresh waters. It is a nocturnal forager, preying mainly on zooplankton and small fishes.

== Usage ==
Kuhlia mugil is caught for food, bait, and the aquarium trade. Fishermen use seines, gill nets and hook and line to catch them. It is sold fresh or preserved by drying and salting.

== Bibliography ==
- Randall, J.E. and H.A. Randall (2001) Review of the fishes of the genus Kuhlia (Perciformes: Kuhliidae) of the Central Pacific., Pac. Sci. 55(3):227–256.
- Randall, J.E. (1995) Coastal fishes of Oman., University of Hawaii Press, Honolulu, Hawaii. 439 pp.
- Talwar, P.K. and A.G. Jhingran (1991) Inland fishes of India and adjacent countries. Volume 2., A.A. Balkema, Rotterdam.
- Eschmeyer, W.N. (ed.) (2005) Catalog of fishes
- Maugé, L.A. (1986) Kuhliidae., pp. 306–307. In J. Daget, J.-P. Gosse and D.F.E. Thys van den Audenaerde (eds.) Check-list of the freshwater fishes of Africa (CLOFFA). ISNB, Bruxelles, MRAC, Tervuren; and ORSTOM, Paris. Vol. 2.
