= Peter L. Shelton =

American architect (1945–2012)

- Born: Peter Laros Shelton; March 26, 1945; Bethlehem, Pennsylvania, U.S.
- Died: August 26, 2012 (aged 67); Manhattan, New York City, U.S.
- Education: University of Pennsylvania; Pratt Institute
- Occupation: Architect
- Partner: Lee F. Mindel
- Awards: Cooper Hewitt, Smithsonian Design Museum's National Design Award
- Practice: Shelton, Mindel & Associates; Emery Roth & Sons; Edward Durrell Stone & Associates

Peter Laros Shelton (March 26, 1945 - August 26, 2012) was an architect and interior designer based in New York City. The New York Times wrote, his "less-is-more sensibility became a hallmark for apartments ringing Central Park." Editor in chief of Architectural Digest, Margaret Russell, said Shelton was a leader in the field who "won pretty much every award a firm could win."

In 2011, Shelton's firm received the Cooper Hewitt, Smithsonian Design Museum's National Design Award for interior design, and he was inducted to the International Interior Design Association Hall of Fame in 1996.

== Early life and education ==
Shelton was born in Bethlehem, Pennsylvania, to Margaret (nee Laros) and Talbot Shelton, vice-president of Bethlehem Steel. His maternal grandfather was industrialist Russel K. Laros. Shelton graduated from the University of Pennsylvania in 1968, where he was a member of the fraternity of St. Anthony Hall. He received a master’s in architecture from the Pratt Institute in 1975.

== Career ==
Shelton worked in the offices of Edward Durrell Stone & Associates and Emery Roth & Sons before founding Shelton, Mindel & Associates with Lee F. Mindel in 1978. The two architects worked on all projects together. Shelton "conceived the plans," and Mindel "refined those plans and dealt with clients." Architectural Design wrote, Their designs appear seamless, effortless—even inevitable… Every detail of their work—from the floor plan and the materials to the lighting, the furnishings and the artwork—has been carefully analyzed."

One of the firm's early commissions was designing the 48,000 square foot Times Square club called Bond International Casino in 1980. The project was well-reviewed and built its reputation. The firm was noted for creating interiors for apartments in the Central Park area, gaining many articles in Architectural Digest. Their signature style "marries clean-lined minimalism with a luminous classicism," resulting in "exacting spaces in neutral hues, with felicitous pops of color; dashing midcentury furnishings mingled with crisp bespoke pieces." Sting was one of their celebrity clients, and they also designed the New York City and the corporate headquarters of Polo Ralph Lauren. They also designed the bar and dining areas of Celebrity cruise ships.

After one residential project in The Hamptons, Shelton said, "We tried to accept the building and embrace what it had to offer. The question was how to honor the old while bringing it forward.”

== Awards ==
Shelton, Mindel won 25 awards from the American Institute of Architects and three design awards from the Society of American Registered Architects. The firm was inducted into the International Interior Design Hall of Fame in 1996. In 2011, Shelton, Mindel & Associates won the Cooper Hewitt, Smithsonian Design Museum's National Design Award for interior design. This award is given to an individual or firm for exceptional and exemplary work in domestic, corporate, or cultural interior design."

== Personal life and death ==
Shelton was married at 50 to Laura Bennett, a trained architect turned fashion designer who competed in the third season of a Bravo reality television series Project Runway. Together they had five sons: Peik, Truman, Pierson, Larson, Finn, and a step-daughter Cleo from Bennett's first marriage.

In 2012, Shelton died at his home in Manhattan from cancer at age 67.
