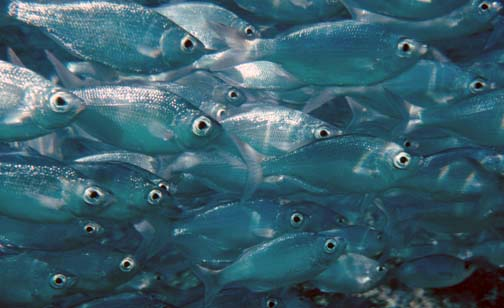
- Hawaiian flagtail (K. sandvicensis)

Scientific classification
- Kingdom: Animalia
- Phylum: Chordata
- Class: Actinopterygii
- Division: Teleostei
- Order: Centrarchiformes
- Family: Kuhliidae; D. S. Jordan & Evermann, 1896
- Genus: Kuhlia; T. N. Gill, 1861

Type species
- Perca ciliate G. Cuvier, 1828

Synonyms
- List: Boulengerina Fowler, 1907; Herops De Vis, 1884; Moronopsis T. N. Gill, 1863; Paradules Bleeker, 1863; Platysome E. Liénard, 1832; Safole D. S. Jordan, 1912

= Flagtail =

Family of ray-finned fish

The flagtails (āhole or āholehole in the Hawaiian language) are a family (Kuhliidae) of centrarchiform ray-finned fish of the Indo-Pacific area. The family consists of 13 species in one genus, Kuhlia. Most are euryhaline and often found in brackish water, but the genus also includes species restricted to marine or fresh water.

Several species are known as Hawaiian flagtails, particularly K. sandvicensis and K. xenura.

== Etymology ==
The genus Kuhlia is named for the German zoologist Heinrich Kuhl (1797–1821).

== Species ==
The currently recognized species in this genus are:

Species	Common name	Image
Kuhlia caudavittata (Lacépède, 1802)		
Kuhlia malo (Valenciennes, 1831)		
Kuhlia marginata (G. Cuvier, 1829)	dark-margined flagtail	
Kuhlia mugil (J. R. Forster, 1801)	barred flagtail	
Kuhlia munda (De Vis, 1884)	silver flagtail	
Kuhlia nutabunda Kendall & Radcliffe, 1912	Rapanui flagtail	
Kuhlia petiti L. P. Schultz, 1943		
Kuhlia rupestris (Lacépède, 1802)	rock flagtail	
Kuhlia salelea L. P. Schultz, 1943		
Kuhlia sandvicensis (Steindachner, 1876)	Hawaiian flagtail	
Kuhlia sauvagii Regan, 1913		
Kuhlia splendens Regan, 1913		
Kuhlia xenura (D. S. Jordan & C. H. Gilbert, 1882)		

== Description ==
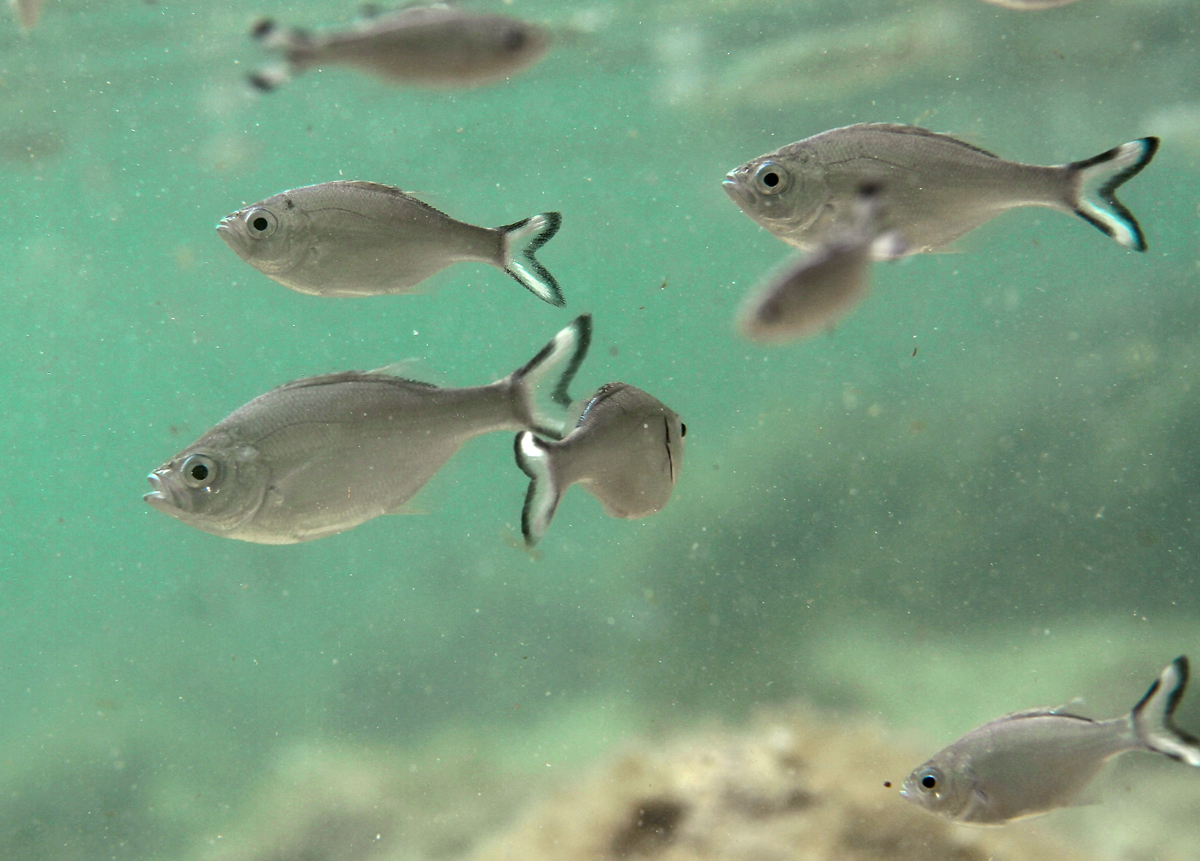
A school of young Kuhlia caudavittata.

The distinctive characteristic of these fish is a scaly sheath around the dorsal and anal fins. The dorsal fin is deeply notched between the 10 spines and the 9 to 13 soft rays. The opercle has two spines, and the anal fin three. Their bodies are compressed and silvery, and they tend to be small, growing to 50 cm (20 in) at most.

During the day, they usually school, dispersing at night to feed on free-swimming fish and crustaceans.

A study of sperm motility in Kuhlia marginata found that sperm were most active in water with salinity between 25 and 35 parts per thousand, indicating that the species spawns in seawater rather than in rivers. This provided the first experimental evidence that K. marginata is catadromous, migrating from freshwater habitats to the sea to reproduce. Estimation of spawning sites in the spotted flagtail, Kuhlia marginata, based on sperm motility.

Analysis of otolith strontium-to-calcium (Sr/Ca) ratios confirmed that Kuhlia marginata spends its early life stages at sea before migrating to freshwater, then returns to the ocean to spawn. The study also found that males typically die at sea after spawning, while females may return to rivers and spawn multiple times during their lifetime

In Hawai‘i, flagtails (Kuhlia spp.), known locally as āholehole, inhabit a wide range of environments, including marine, estuarine, and freshwater habitats. These fishes play an important ecological and cultural role in Hawaiian coastal systems. Some use them as a food source and cultural ceremonies.
