= Kohanaiki Beach Park =

Park in Kailua, Hawaii County, Hawaii

Coordinates: 19.6982°N 156.0465°W

Kohanaiki Beach Park is a relatively new park, established in 2013, located in Kailua, Hawaii County, Hawaii. Called "Pinetree" by the local people, it is a quiet park visited by the local people mainly, its entrance on Hawaii State Highway 19 being shown only as "Shoreline".

There are both sand and rock shores. In the sand shore, there is a small pool where children can swim or wade, while many surfers play in the rock shore. Camping is also permitted.

== Facilities ==
There are the following facilities:

- Restrooms
- Outdoor shower

== See also ==
- Old Kona Airport State Recreation Area
- Kaloko-Honokohau National Historical Park
