= West Hawai'i Explorations Academy =

Coordinates: 19°43′39″N 156°03′18″W

West Hawaii Explorations Academy
- 73-4460 Queen Ka`ahumanu Highway, #105; Kailua-Kona, Hawaii 96740; United States

Information
- Type: Charter School
- Motto: No child left inside.
- Established: 2000
- Grades: 6–12
- Enrollment: 280
- Mascot: Nautilus
- Website: www.whea.net

West Hawai'i Explorations Academy (WHEA), officially West Hawaii Explorations Academy Public Charter School, is a public charter school located in Kailua-Kona, Hawai'i, United States, founded on May 4, 2000. It includes a middle school (grades 6–8) and a high school (9-12), with a total student body of about 280. The school has a project based curriculum with emphasis placed on individual time management, technical writing, and experiential research. Most WHEA projects can be classified as either marine, Malama ʻaina (taking care of the land), or energy related.

The school motto is "No Child Left Inside" which reflects the school's focus on getting students outdoors and into the community to participate in meaningful hands-on education. The program was originally created as a school-within-a-school of Konawaena High School where students with at least a 3.6 GPA could attend for a semester. Currently, the school does not screen students on the basis of academic merit, although it does tend to attract self-motivated students interested in science.

In 2005, WHEA was honored by the Blue Ribbon Lighthouse School Awards, and Intel and Scholastic Schools of Distinction. The school is located on the site of the Natural Energy Laboratory of Hawaii Authority on Keahole Point, on the Island of Hawaiʻi, within walking distance of tide pools where organisms are sometimes collected for study and research.

== Application and Admission ==
WHEA is a public charter school, so all students are allowed to apply for attendance free of tuition. Application forms are available on their website. Admission is generally first apply, first enrolled, starting in February, but a lottery and waiting list are employed on "draw days" at the first of the month if demand out strips supply for spaces.
