= Kuhlia malo =

Conservation status
- Data Deficient (IUCN 3.1)

Scientific classification
- Kingdom: Animalia
- Phylum: Chordata
- Class: Actinopterygii
- Order: Centrarchiformes
- Family: Kuhliidae
- Genus: Kuhlia
- Species: K. malo

Binomial name
- Kuhlia malo (Valenciennes, 1831)

Synonyms
- Dules malo Valenciennes, 1831; Dules mato Lesson, 1831; Dules leuciscus Jenyns, 1840

Species of fish

Kuhlia malo is a freshwater and brackish water species of ray-finned fish from the family Kuhliidae which is endemic to French Polynesia.

== Description ==
Kuhlia malo is a silvery colour with small, round, black spots over its back. The rear margin and lobe tips of the forked caudal fin are black. The upper and lower edges of lobes of the caudal fin are narrowly pale. The central part of the tail is pale with black markings which are parallel with the rays.

== Distribution ==
Kuhlia malo is endemic to French Polynesia where it is native to Tahiti and Moorea. It has been introduced to Nuki Hiva in the Marquesas to where fish were transported on board the National Marine Fisheries Service vessel Hugh M Smith by the Hawaiian Division of Game and Fish in 195. Most of the fish were to be taken to Hawaii to be introduced but none survived the voyage.

== Habitat and biology ==
Kuhlia malo swim in the middle part of the water and is found mainly in freshwater. They are typically recorded as adults swimming in schools in flowing water and they are commonest in the lower parts of river systems. They move into estuaries to spawn although they are rarely observed in purely marine environments. Following spawning, some of them will remain in the estuaries and others return to freshwater. Kuhlia malo is a very capable disperser.

== Etymology ==
Kuhlia malo was first described as Dules malo in 1831 by Achille Valenciennes with the type locality given as The Little River of Matovai, Tahiti. Valenciennes gave it the specific name malo, stating that this was a Tahitian name for this fish. The modern French name is nato.
