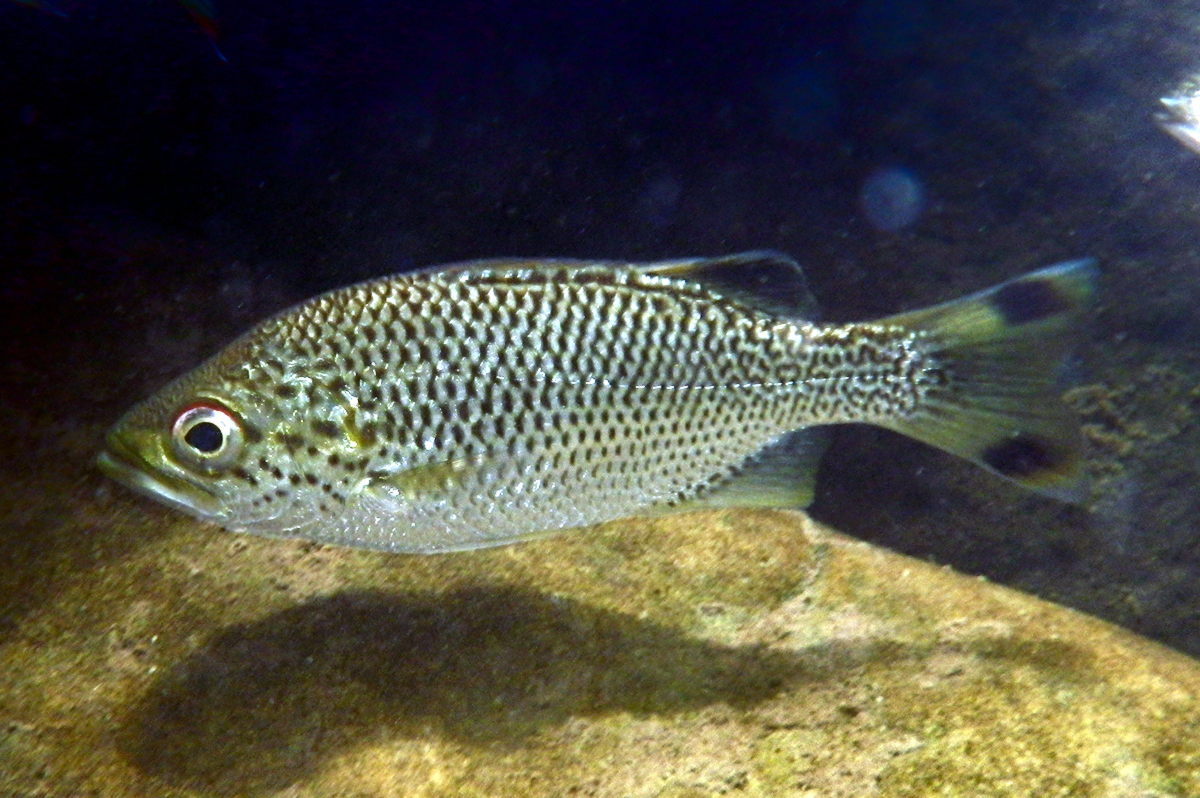
- A jungle perch, Kuhlia rupestris, in the Yuchingawa River, Iriomotejima Island, Japan

Conservation status
- Least Concern (IUCN 3.1)

Scientific classification
- Kingdom: Animalia
- Phylum: Chordata
- Class: Actinopterygii
- Division: Teleostei
- Order: Centrarchiformes
- Family: Kuhliidae
- Genus: Kuhlia
- Species: K. rupestris

Binomial name
- Kuhlia rupestris (Lacépède, 1802)

Synonyms
- Centropomus rupestris Lacepède, 1802; Dules rupestris (Lacepède, 1802); Moronopsis rupestris (Lacepède, 1802); Perca ciliate Cuvier, 1828; Moronopsis ciliates (Cuvier, 1828); Dules fuscus Cuvier, 1829; Moronopsis fuscus (Cuvier, 1829); Dules guamensis Valenciennes, 1831; Dules vanicolensis Valenciennes, 1831; Dules haswellii Macleay, 1881; Kuhlia caerulescens Regan, 1913; Kuhlia sauvagii Regan, 1913; Kuhlia splendens Regan, 1913

= Kuhlia rupestris =

Species of fish

Kuhlia rupestris, the rock flagtail, jungle perch, mountain trout, buffalo bream, dusky-finned bulleye, rockmountain bass or spotted flagtail, is a species of ray-finned fish, a flagtail, from the family Kuhliidae. It is a catadromous species which is native to the Indo-Pacific and northern Australia.

== Description ==
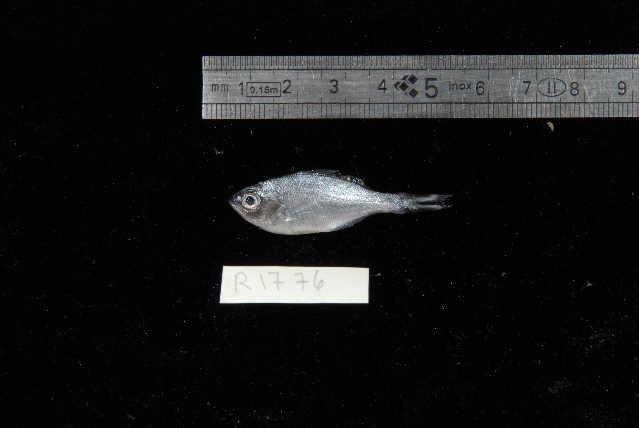

Kuhlia rupestris has a compressed body which is moderately deep. It has a pointed head with an oblique, protractible mouth and large eyes. It has a deeply notched dorsal fin and an emarginate caudal fin with relatively rounded lobes. This species is brown to olive in colour on its upperparts, silvery on the flanks and white on the belly and breast. The flanks are marked with numerous dusky or red-brown spots and the tail is marked with a black blotch on each lobe of the caudal fin. The scales are cycloid. In older fish the tail blotches may become fused to form a vertical bar. The dorsal fin has 10 spines and 10-12 soft rays while the anal fin has 3 spines and 9-11 soft rays.

== Distribution ==
Kuhlia rupestris has a wide distribution in the Indian and Pacific oceans. It occurs off eastern Africa from Somalia south to South Africa and across the Indian Ocean into the western Pacific north to the Ryukyu Islands of Japan and south to Australia. In the Pacific it reaches as far east as Fiji, Samoa and the Caroline Islands. In Australia it is found in the Gulf of Carpentaria, Cape York south to the Tallebudgera Creek in southern Queensland.

== Habitat and biology ==
Kuhlia rupestris is found in fast flowing freshwater streams and rivers normally within rainforest but it also occurs in estuaries and inshore coastal waters up to an altitude of 240 metres (790 ft). It is frequently recorded from rocky pools below waterfalls. It is a migrant which has to move from freshwaters into the sea to spawn and it is thought that they follow flood plumes out to sea in the wet season and spawn en masse at the margins of these plumes. The sperm produced by males of K. rupestris are not motile in fresh or brackish water. They need to migrate to freshwater to complete their life cycle. They are omnivorous fish which feed on insects, crustaceans and small fishes as well as on fallen fruit, especially figs.

== Conservation ==
Kuhlia rupestris is a highly sought species by anglers, especially as it is regarded as a quick learner and learns to avoid lures. Queensland has a bag limit on this species. It has a wide range and is assessed as least concern by the IUCN. However, it is threatened by habitat degradation. Dams and impoundments block river channels and reduce the availability of habitat and resulted in reduced populations and extirpation in some waters.
