= Manta Pacific Research Foundation =

Marine conservation non-profit in Hawaii

- Formation: 2002
- Founder: Keller and Wendy Laros
- Type: Nonprofit
- Headquarters: Kona, Hawaii
- Website: https://www.mantapacific.org/

The Manta Pacific Research Foundation is a 501(c)(3) nonprofit focused on manta ray conservation.

Based on the Big Island of Hawaii, the foundation's stated objective is to "study manta rays in their natural habitat, conduct scientific research, provide education programs for the public about manta rays and the marine environment, and to establish and promote global manta ray conservation". The foundation has been active in protection of the manta rays in Hawaii, public education about manta rays, and scientific research. The foundation maintains the identification database which contains pictures of the unique spot patterns on the ventral side of the individual mantas so they can be identified and tracked.

== Protection of manta rays in Hawaiian Waters ==
On 5 June 2009, Hawaii Governor Linda Lingle signed Act 092(09) making it illegal to kill or capture manta rays in Hawaii. The implementation of this Act protecting manta rays followed a campaign during which the foundation played an active role, including organizing a petition on the foundation's website starting in 2006. Co-Founder Keller was awarded as a "Sea Hero" by ScubaDiving.com for his, and the foundation's role in achieving the protections.

== Implementation of voluntary practices for manta ray interactions ==
Supported development of voluntary practices and standards for tour operators for manta ray interactions relative to the night dives with manta rays off the Kona coast of the Big Island of Hawaii which were agreed by manta ray night dive tour operators in 2013.

== Established the Manta Learning Center in Keauhou, Hawaii ==
The Manta Learning Center was established by the foundation in the Sheraton Kona Resort and Spa so that people interested in learning about manta rays have a resource for additional information.
