= Old Kona Airport State Recreation Area =

Park

Coordinates: 19°38′32.9″N 156°0′18.2″W

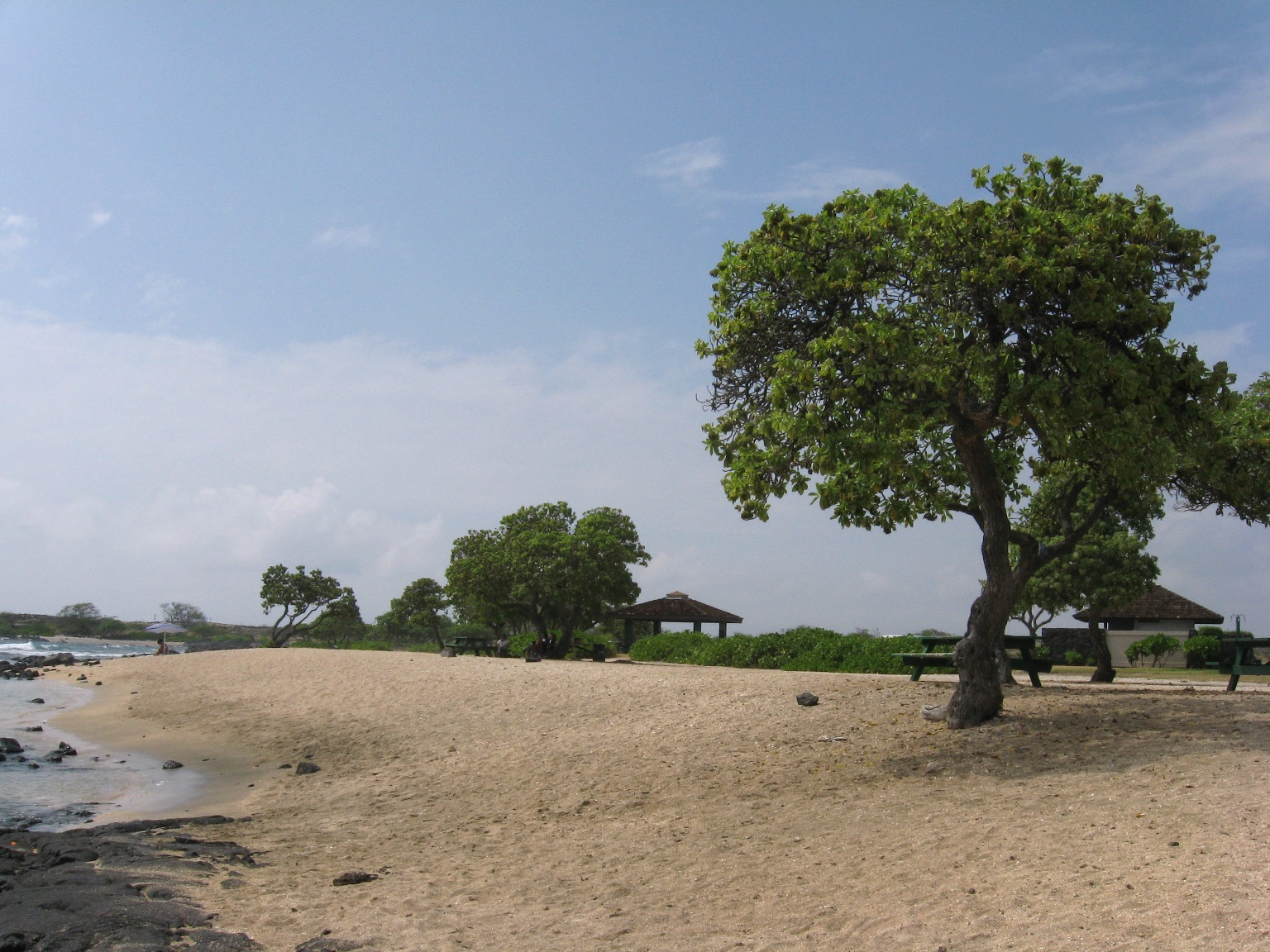
The beach at the Old Kona Airport

Old Kona Airport State Recreation Area (known locally as Old A) is a park built on the site of an old landing strip just north of Kailua, Hawaii County, Hawaii.

== History ==
During World War II, a small landing strip was cleared near the end of Kuakini Highway. In 1947, the State of Hawaii approved a small passenger terminal and a 3,800 foot (1,200 m) runway to be built for tourist flights, which was operational in 1948 and dedicated in 1949. In 1950, 5,000 feet (1,500 m) of fencing was added to keep out cattle which would wander onto the site. The 1960s brought development of several larger hotels and resorts in the Kailua-Kona area. During the early 1960s, Aloha Airlines and Hawaiian Airlines were operating nonstop flights to Kahului on Maui, nonstop and direct flights to Honolulu on Oahu and direct flights to Lihue on Kauai, Aloha with Fairchild F-27 turboprop aircraft and Hawaiian with "Super" Convair 340 prop aircraft. Larger aircraft such as the Boeing 707 and Douglas DC-8 could not take off from the short runway; however, Aloha Airlines and Hawaiian Airlines were both operating jet service from the old airport during the late 1960s with flights to Honolulu, Kahului and Lihue, Aloha with the British Aircraft Corporation BAC One-Eleven and Hawaiian with the Douglas DC-9-10 with both airlines also operating turboprop aircraft as well at this same time, Aloha with the four engine Vickers Viscount and Hawaiian with the Convair 640. When the much larger Kona International Airport was built further north at Keahole Point in 1970, Aloha and Hawaiian moved their airline flights to this new airfield and the old landing strip was then used for drag racing before being turned into a state park in 1976. The original airstrip was called Old Kona Airport post facto.

== Facilities ==
The facilities on the 103.7 acres (42.0 ha) of the old airport are run by the County of Hawaiʻi. These include baseball, soccer fields and a Skateboarding Park. the Kona Community Aquatic Center, and Kekuaokalani Gym, located at 75-5530 Kuakini Highway. A 217-acre (88 ha) marine preserve was created off shore in 1992. A day use boat mooring is near the prominent "Shark Rock" toward the northwestern boundary. Water depth at the mooring is about 40 feet (12 m). A reef shelf East of Shark rock creates a small surf break. Snorkellers and Scuba divers usually enter the water at a protected cove at the Northwestern end of the beach. On Kukaʻilimoku Point Southeast of the park sits a lighthouse to guide ships into Kailua Bay. North of the park is Papawai Bay (meaning "water layer" in the Hawaiian Language). The land there is owned by the Queen Liliʻuokalani Trust, which also leases some of its property to two large shopping centers, the Kona Commons which opened in 2008, and the Makalapua Center in 1994.

The old 3,800-foot-long (1,200 m) runway now serves as an access road and large parking lot, and the old terminal building, located at 75 Kuakini Highway, is a public use pavilion. There is a flat walking trail parallel to the runway, restrooms, showers, and picnic facilities. There are some patches of sand, but the shore is rocky, so care should be taken when entering the water except in calm conditions. No lifeguards are on duty.

== Gallery ==
Gallery
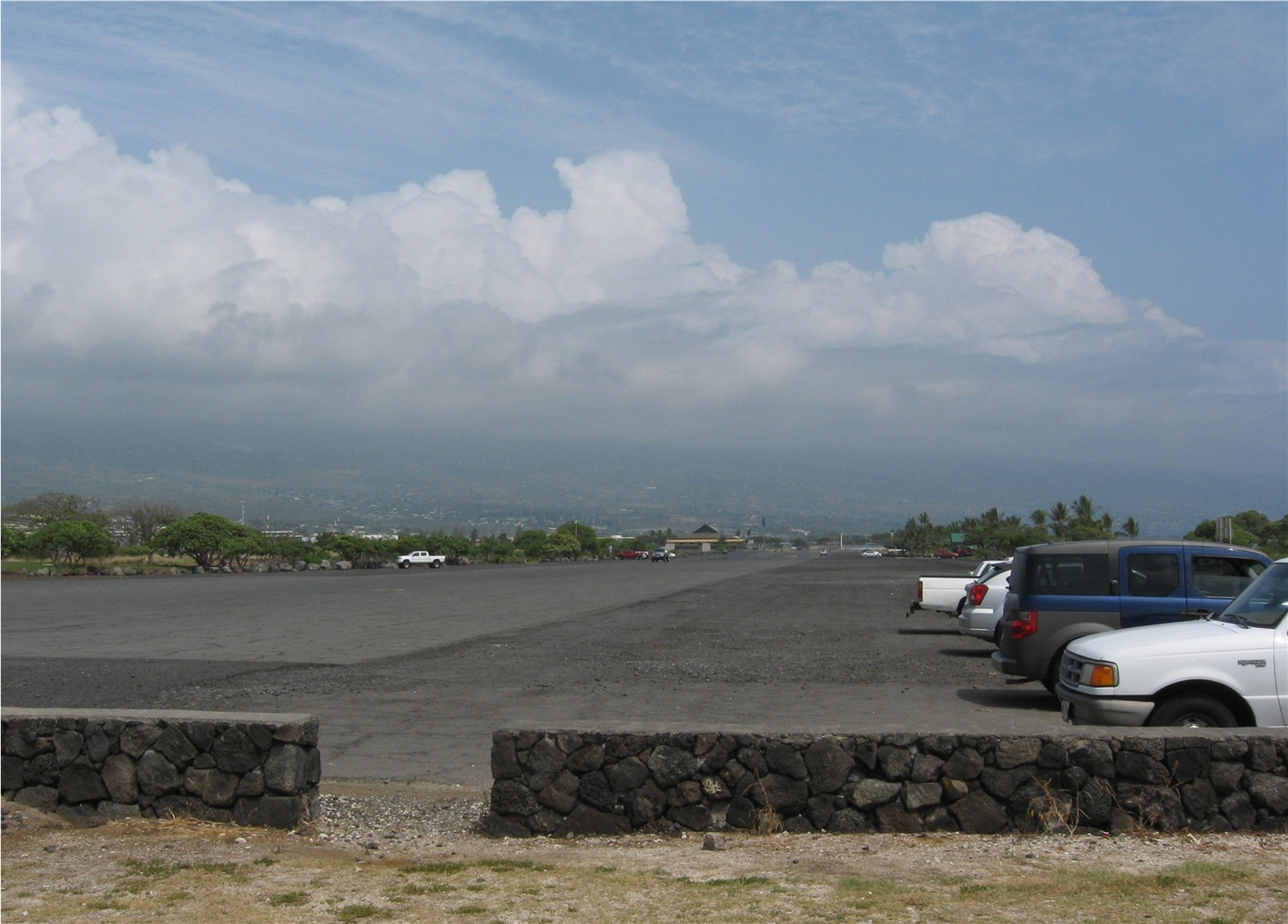
The runway is now an access road and a parking lot

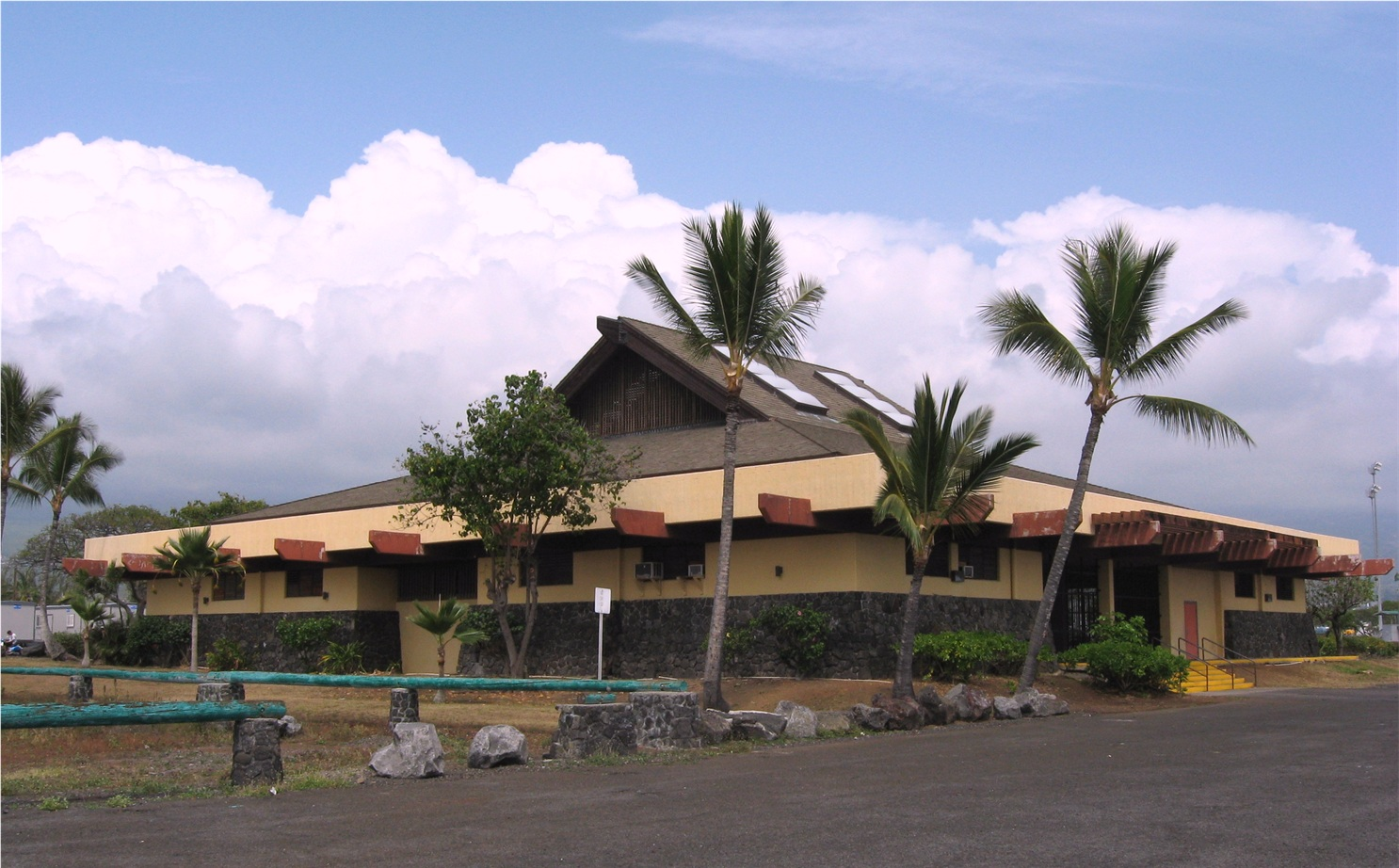
The old terminal building is now a public pavilion

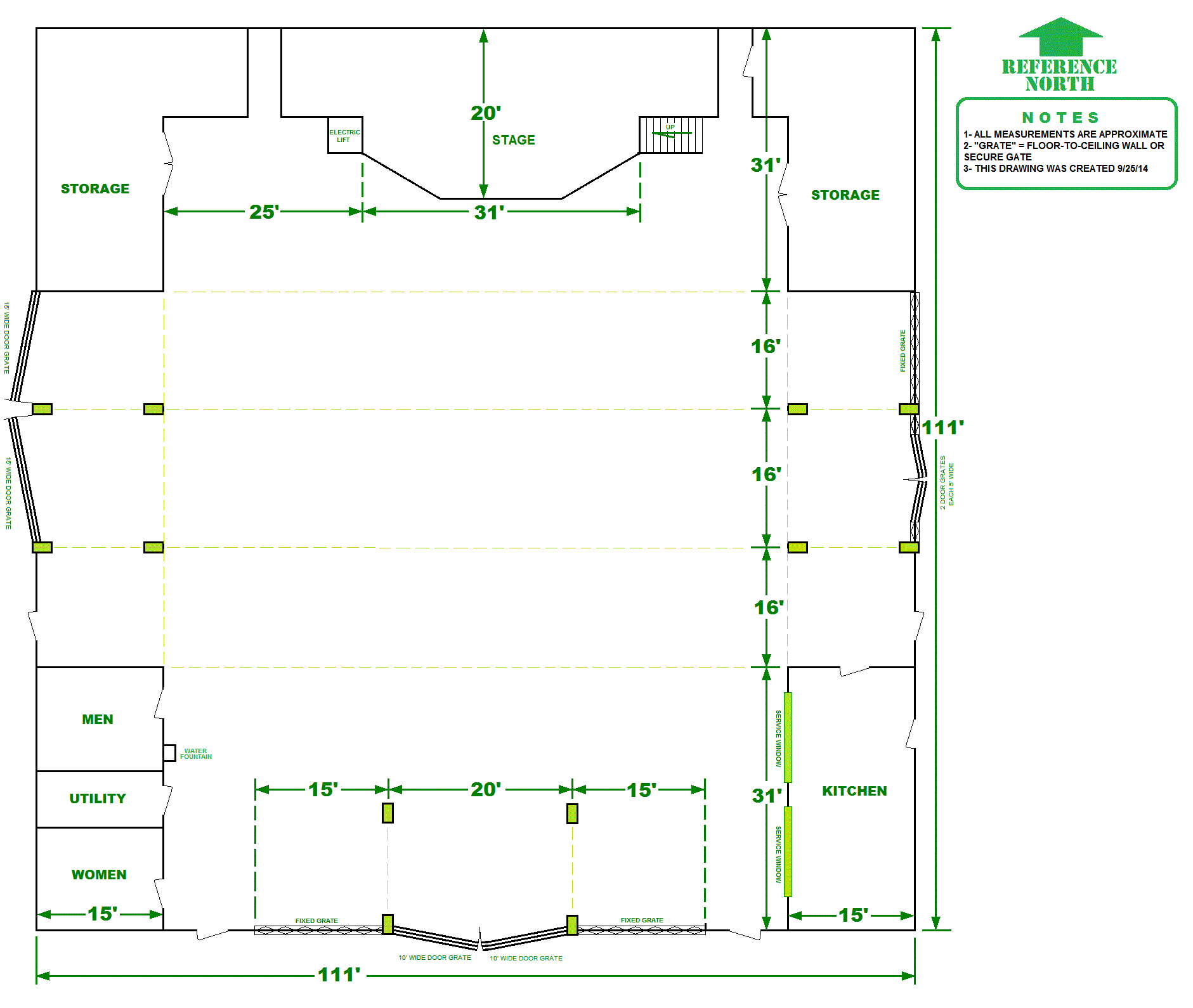
FLOOR PLAN of the existing public pavilion: 75 Kuakini Hwy, Kailua-Kona, HI 96740 - 9/25/14

== See also ==
- Kohanaiki Beach Park
