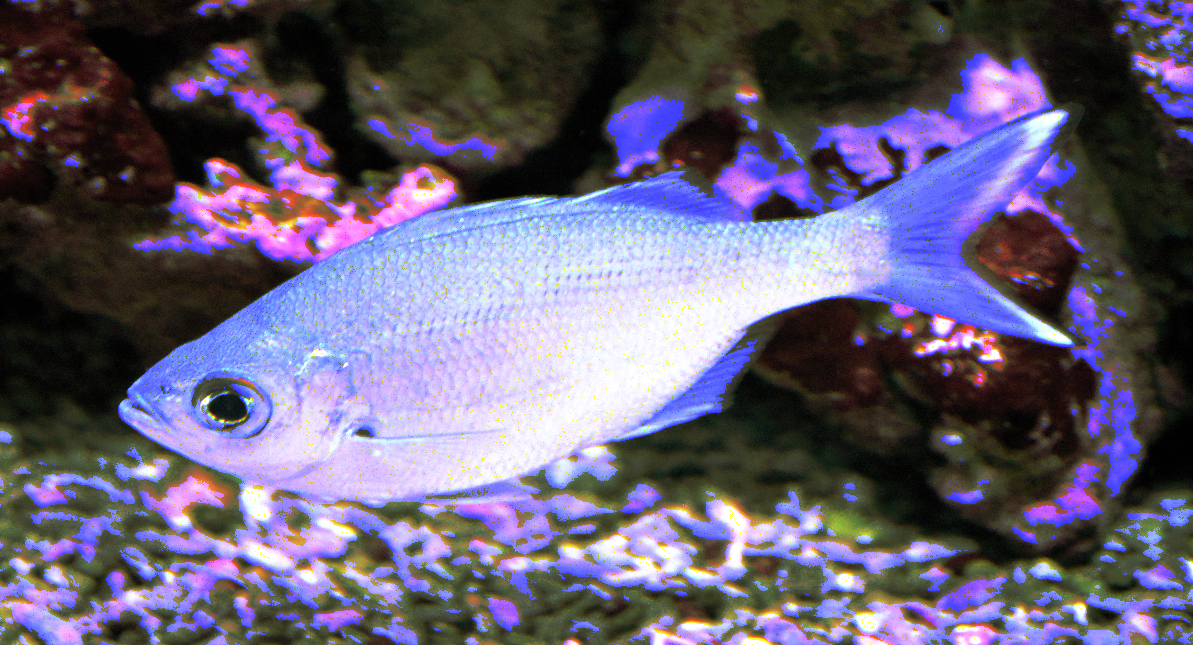

Scientific classification
- Kingdom: Animalia
- Phylum: Chordata
- Class: Actinopterygii
- Order: Centrarchiformes
- Family: Kuhliidae
- Genus: Kuhlia
- Species: K. xenura

Binomial name
- Kuhlia xenura (D. S. Jordan & C. H. Gilbert, 1882)

Synonyms
- Xenichthys xenurus D. S. Jordan & C. H. Gilbert, 1882

= Kuhlia xenura =

Species of fish

Kuhlia xenura, the strange-tailed flagtail or Hawaii flagtail, is a species of ray-finned fish, a flagtail from the family Kuhliidae which is endemic to Hawaii, where it occurs in fresh, brackish, and marine waters. It can be found in tide pools, estuaries, and on reefs occurring over sand or rock.

== Description ==
Kuhlia xenura has a slightly concave dorsal profile of the head in adults, with a large eye. The second spine in the anal fin is around 90% of the length of the third. The caudal fin is deeply forked. This species is silver in colour with a dark grey or dusky caudal fin which has a thin black rear margin and frequently shows a pale submarginal band. The dorsal fin has 10 spines and 10 soft rays while the anal fin has three spines and 10-11 soft rays. This species grows to a standard length of 22.2 cm (8.7 in).

== Distribution ==
Kuhlia xenura is endemic to Hawaii.

== Habitat and biology ==
Kuhlia xenura is frequently observed in schools and can be found in fresh water, brackish habitats, and shallow water along the seashore. While in fresh water they feed mainly on algae, insects, planktonic crustaceans, and foraminiferans, while fish in brackish or salt water eat copepods, amphipods, insects, mollusc larvae, algae, spiders, and annelids. Medium sized fish, with a total length of 75–150 millimetres (3.0–5.9 in), occur in deeper water at the foot of exposed cliffs, in larger tidal pools, or in rivers or ponds. These fish have a diet dominated by crustacean larvae, especially the later stages of crabs and stomatopods. They also eat small amounts of insects and algae. Fish larger than a total length of 150 millimetres (5.9 in) are found in surf exposed cliffs, in caves in outer reefs, and other exposed localities, where they feed largely on crustaceans and polychaete worms. This species is mainly nocturnal. Spawning occurs all year, but peaks between December and June and it appears to occur at sea.

== Taxonomy ==
The strange-tailed flagtail was previously confused with the Hawaiian flagtail until 2001. It was first described as Xenichthys xenurus on the basis of a specimen mistakenly thought to have come from San Salvador, El Salvador. For over a century, the name Xenichthys xenurus was overlooked in the literature, and K. xenura was confused with K. sandvicensis by many authors.

In 2001, the ichthyologist John Ernest Randall and his wife Helen Randall reviewed all nominal flagtail species from the Pacific Ocean. They found that two species had been lumped together under Kuhlia sandvicensis, one of which had been misidentified as the freshwater K. marginata by some authors (the true K. sandvicensis). They found that specimens of the common flagtail species from the Hawaiian Islands misidentified as K. sandvicensis matched the description of Xenichthys xenurus, and thus Kuhlia xenura became the correct name for one of the two flagtail species from Hawaii.
