= Kona International Airport =

Airport on Hawaiʻi Island

Ellison Onizuka Kona International Airport at Keāhole Kahua Mokulele Kauʻāina o Kona
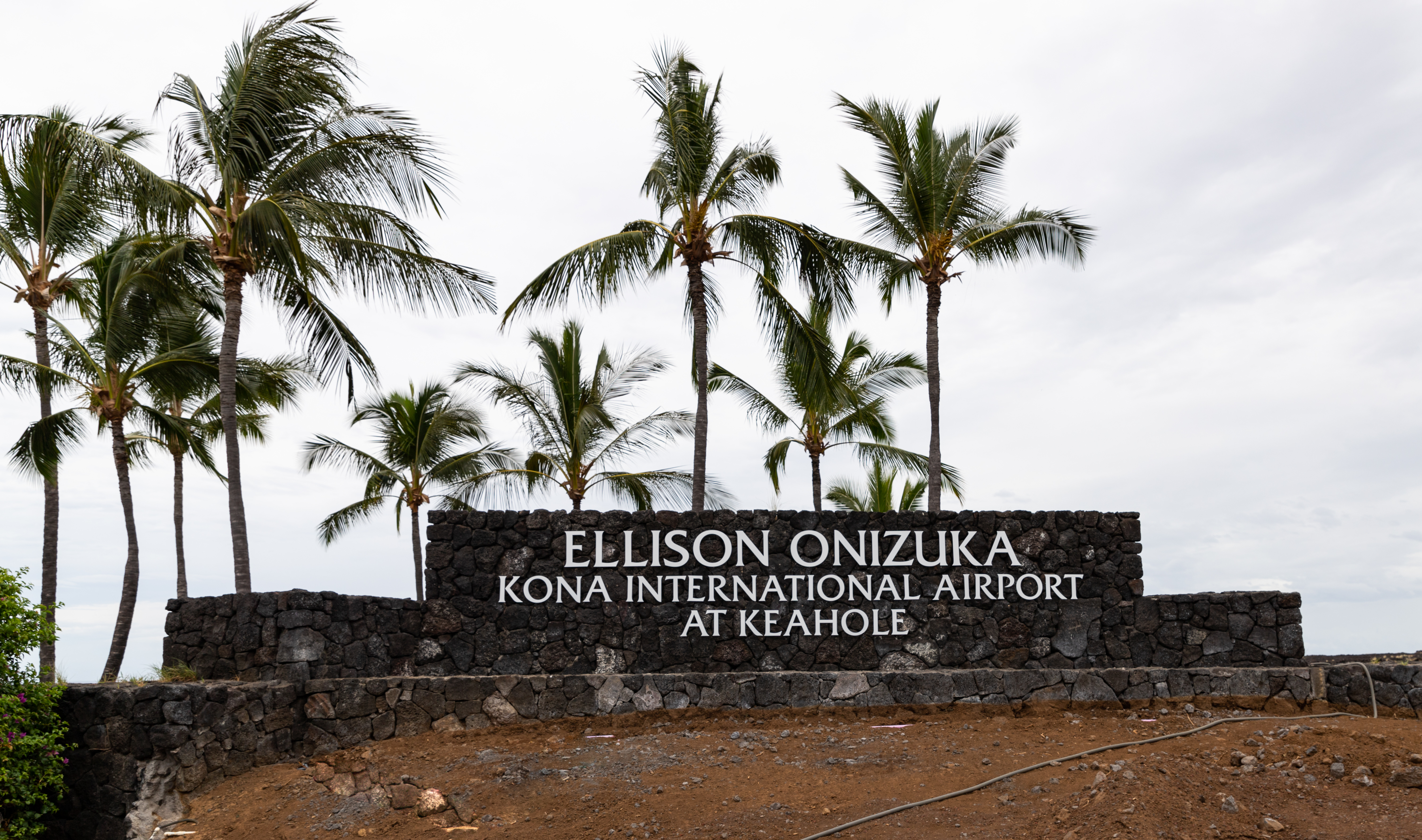
- IATA: KOA; ICAO: PHKO; FAA LID: KOA

Summary
- Airport type: Public
- Owner/Operator: Hawaii Department of Transportation
- Serves: Island of Hawaii
- Location: Kalaoa, Hawaii
- Hub for: Mokulele Airlines Hawaiian Airlines
- Elevation AMSL: 47 ft (14 m)
- Coordinates: 19°44′20″N 156°02′44″W
- Website: airports.hawaii.gov/koa

Maps
- FAA airport diagram
- Interactive map of Ellison Onizuka Kona International Airport at Keāhole

Runways
Direction	Length		Surface
Direction	ft	m	Surface
17/35	11,000	3,353	Asphalt

Statistics (2025)
- Aircraft operations: 99,319
- Total Passengers: 4,172,484
- Total Cargo (tons): 57,297
- Source: Federal Aviation Administration, Department of Transportation Hawaii

Ellison Onizuka Kona International Airport at Keāhole (IATA: KOA, ICAO: PHKO, FAA LID: KOA) is the primary airport on the Island of Hawaiʻi, located in the Kailua-Kona area, Hawaii, United States. The airport serves leeward (western) Hawaiʻi island, including the resorts in North Kona and South Kohala. It is one of two international airports serving Hawaiʻi island, the other being Hilo International Airport on the windward (eastern) side.

It is included in the Federal Aviation Administration's National Plan of Integrated Airport Systems for 2021–2025, in which it is categorized as a small-hub primary commercial service facility.

== History ==
=== Construction ===
Much of the runway is built on a relatively recent lava flow: the 1801 Huʻehuʻe flow from Hualālai. This flow extended the shoreline out an estimated 1 mi (1.6 km), adding some 4 km^{2} (1.5 sq mi) of land to the island and creating Keāhole Point. The airport opened on July 1, 1970, with a single 6,500-foot (2.0 km) runway; the previous smaller airstrip was converted into the Old Kona Airport State Recreation Area.

Construction crews from Bechtel Corporation used three million pounds of dynamite to flatten the lava tube riddled lava flow within 13 months.

In its first full year, 515,378 passengers passed through the new open-air tropical-style terminals.

=== Naming ===
The airport has had several names over its lifetime.

At the time of its opening in 1970, it was named the Ke-āhole Airport, after its geographical location, Keāhole Point, itself named after the ʻāhole fish found in the area.

In 1993, the airport was renamed Keāhole-Kona International Airport, after the nearby resort town of Kona. In 1997, the Kona name was further emphasized when the airport was renamed the Kona International Airport at Keāhole.

On January 8, 2017, the airport was renamed Ellison Onizuka Kona International Airport at Keāhole to honor astronaut Ellison Onizuka who was born and raised in Kona and died in the Space Shuttle Challenger disaster.

=== Impact ===
Prior to the construction of the new airport in 1970, tourism was centered on the town of Hilo on the eastern side of the Big Island. Tourists to Kona and the western side of the island typically flew into the Hilo Airport and had to make nearly two hour drive across the island. The lack of a major airport became especially problematic as large resorts started opening in Kona around 1968.

When the airport opened, it helped accelerate a shift of tourism from East Hawaii to West Hawaii. Tourism in Hilo had already taken a hit when a tsunami destroyed all seaside hotels in 1960.

The full extent of the airport's impact and shift in tourism can be seen in Hawaii Island Strategic Plan for 2006 to 2015. By 2005 the percentage of accommodations on the west side of the island increased to 86% of the total. In 2005, just four modest hotels continued to serve the east side of the Big Island, with three of them dating back to the 1960s.

Tourism has helped fuel Hawaii County's overall population growth. Between 1990 and 2010, the population increased 48%.

=== Expansion ===
Aloha Airlines and Hawaiian Airlines were the primary air carriers during the early and mid-1970s for inter-island flights from Honolulu on Oahu, Kahului on Maui and Lihue on Kauai with Aloha operating Boeing 737-200 jets and Hawaiian operating McDonnell Douglas DC-9-30 jets at this time. In the late 1970s, Hawaiian operated larger McDonnell Douglas DC-9-50 jets on its inter-island flights.

By early 1985, United Airlines was operating nonstop service into the airport from both Los Angeles and San Francisco with Douglas DC-8-71 and wide-body McDonnell Douglas DC-10 jetliners.

In 1991, a small museum, the Astronaut Ellison S. Onizuka Space Center opened at the airport. The displays included a sample of lunar soil, a spacesuit from Apollo 13, and personal items from Onizuka.

In 1994, the airport's runway was extended to 11,000 feet (3,400 m), the second-longest in the Hawaiian Islands after Honolulu. The longer runways enabled much larger aircraft to use the airport, enabling nonstop flights between Kona and Tokyo or destinations in the United States beyond the West Coast hubs.

Japan Airlines (JAL) started a Kona-Tokyo flight in 1996. The route was suspended between 2010 and September 2017 leaving the island with only one scheduled international flight (to Vancouver) for a time. Hawaiian Airlines filed an application with the US Department of Transportation (USDOT) for nonstop flights from Kona to Tokyo's Haneda Airport, to restore the link between the two cities after JAL ended flights to Narita Airport in 2010. The USDOT rejected the airline's application in favor of Delta's Seattle to Haneda flights despite support from residents of west Hawaii. On October 23, 2013, Hawaiian Airlines announced that they would re-apply to the USDOT for nonstop Kona-Haneda flights a year after their application to fly that route was rejected. On July 8, 2016, Hawaiian Airlines announced that nonstop Kona-Haneda flights would begin on December 20, 2016, after the USDOT awarded them the route in May. JAL's resumption of daily Tokyo service in 2017 generated 900 jobs and $8.58 million in tax revenue for the Big Island during its first year, according to the Hawaiian Tourism Authority. Tokyo service on both Hawaiian and JAL was suspended during the COVID-19 pandemic, during which time a new international arrivals facility was built at Kona; JAL resumed its Narita-Kona route in August 2022.

A modernization project started in March 2017 to combine the airport's two separate terminals into one terminal area. The program allowed the airport to have one, central security screening area and also allowed passengers to use the shopping and dining areas in either terminal. To enable the expansion, the Onizuka Space Center was closed in March 2016, and the airport was renamed after Onizuka in January 2017.

== Facilities and aircraft ==
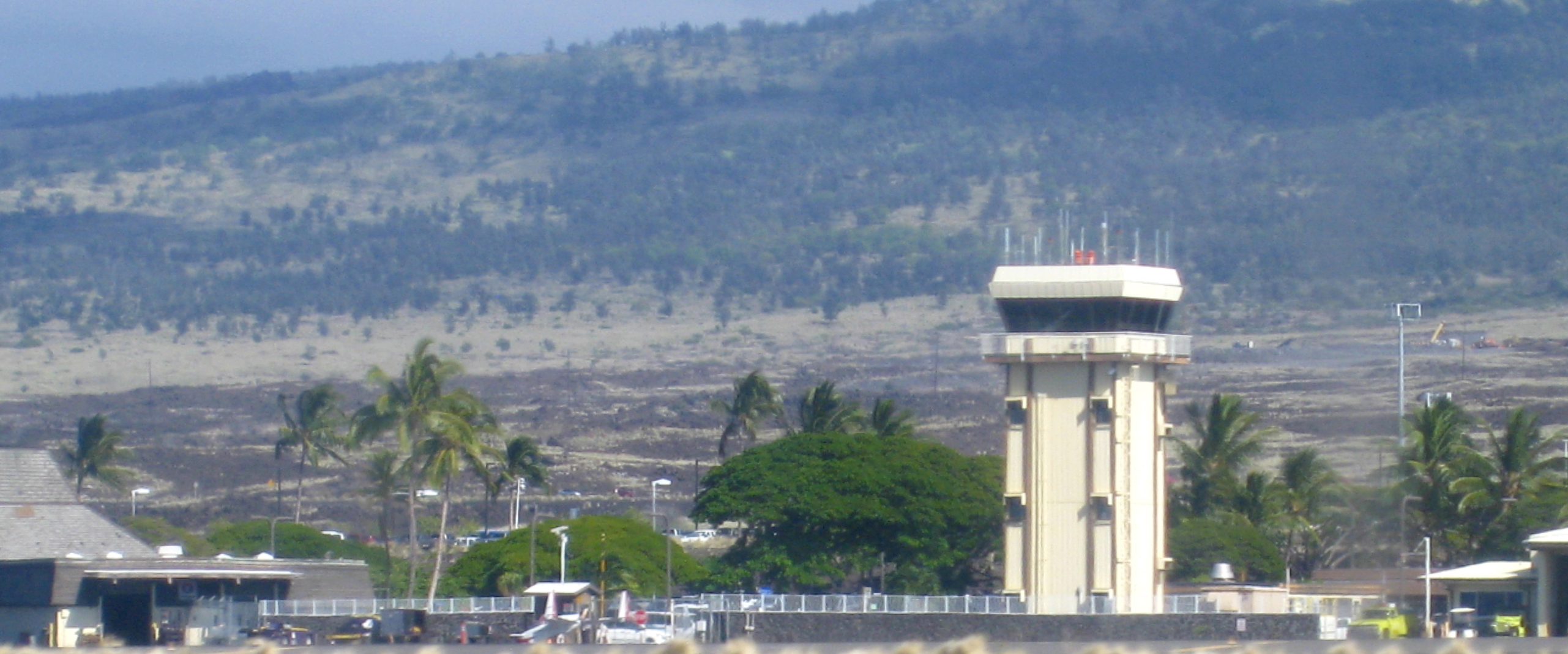
The airport's former control tower (demolished in 2014)

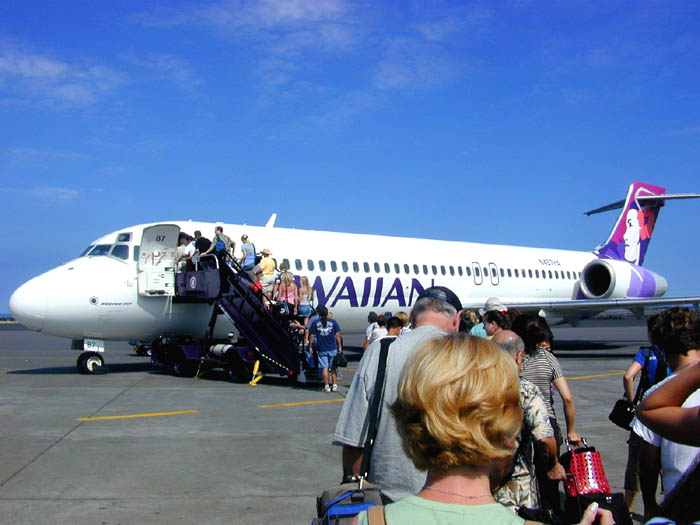
Passengers boarding a Hawaiian Airlines Boeing 717

Ellison Onizuka Kona International Airport at Keāhole is about 7 miles (11 km) from the Kailua-Kona town site. The airport covers 4,204 acres (1,701 ha) at an elevation of 47 feet (14 m) above mean sea level. It has one asphalt runway, 17/35, 11,000 by 150 feet (3,353 x 46 m), which has been shortened to 7,000 by 150 feet (2,134 x 46 m) until October 1, 2025 as part of a runway rehabilitation project.

=== Passenger terminal ===
The state government of Hawaiʻi facility operates a runway and a terminal complex of single-story buildings along the eastern edge of the airfield for passengers, air cargo and mail, airport support, and general aviation. Airport operations fall under the State of Hawaii Department of Transportation.

The commercial passenger facility is a set of rambling, open-air, tropical-style structures, divided into three terminals: Terminal 1 includes gates 1 through 5, Terminal 2 includes gates 6 through 10, and Terminal 3 hosts smaller commuter flights. Kona International is the only remaining major airport in the Hawaiian Islands where passengers board using mobile stairs or ramps, instead of more modern jet bridges. Despite the less modern facilities, Kona is used by large airliners including the Airbus A321 and A330 along with the Boeing 717, 737, 757, 767, 777, and 787.

== Airlines and destinations ==
=== Passenger ===
Airlines	Destinations
Air Canada	Seasonal: Vancouver
Alaska Airlines	Los Angeles, Portland (OR), San Diego, San Francisco, Seattle/Tacoma; Seasonal: Anchorage
American Airlines	Los Angeles, Phoenix–Sky Harbor; Seasonal: Dallas/Fort Worth
Delta Air Lines	Los Angeles, Seattle/Tacoma; Seasonal: Salt Lake City
Hawaiian Airlines	Honolulu, Kahului, Lihue, Sacramento, San Jose (CA)
Mokulele Airlines	Waimea
Southwest Airlines	Honolulu, Kahului, Las Vegas, Sacramento; Seasonal: Los Angeles
United Airlines	Denver, Los Angeles, San Francisco; Seasonal: Chicago–O'Hare
WestJet	Seasonal: Calgary, Vancouver

=== Cargo ===
Airlines	Destinations
Amazon Air	Riverside/March Air Base
Atlas Air	Kahului, Ontario

== Statistics ==
=== Airline market share ===
Busiest airlines serving KOA (September 2025 – August 2026)
Rank	Airline	Passengers	Share
1	Alaska Airlines	1,648,000	42.16%
2	United Airlines	640,000	16.37%
3	Southwest Airlines	607,000	15.53%
4	Hawaiian Airlines	456,000	11.66%
5	American Airlines	286,000	7.32%
6	Other	272,000	6.96%

=== Top destinations ===
Busiest domestic routes from KOA (September 2025 – August 2026)
Rank	City	Passengers	Carriers
1	Honolulu, Hawaii	686,880	Hawaiian, Southwest
2	Los Angeles, California	244,190	American, Delta, Hawaiian, Southwest, United
3	Seattle/Tacoma, Washington	204,500	Alaska, Delta
4	San Francisco, California	193,060	Alaska, United
5	Kahului, Hawaii	137,720	Hawaiian, Mokulele, Southwest
6	Denver, Colorado	78,350	United
7	Sacramento, California	76,980	Hawaiian, Southwest
8	Phoenix, Arizona	65,630	American
9	Las Vegas, Nevada	54,820	Southwest
10	Portland, Oregon	54,000	Alaska

== Accidents and incidents ==
- On August 25, 1977, an Air Cargo Hawaii twin-turboprop Short SC.7 Skyvan crashed and burned while attempting to land at Keahole Airport. The pilot and passenger were killed. The crash occurred about 1.5 mi (2.4 km) short of the runway.
- On September 10, 1989, the pilot of an Aero Commander 680 was making an emergency landing on runway 17 due to loss of power in the right engine. He crashed about 0.25 mi (0.4 km) southwest of the runway, resulting in one fatality and one serious injury.

== See also ==
- List of airports in Hawaii
