= Keahole Point =

Historic Place in Hawaii County, Hawaii

- Kalaoa Permanent House Site 10,205
- U.S. National Register of Historic Places
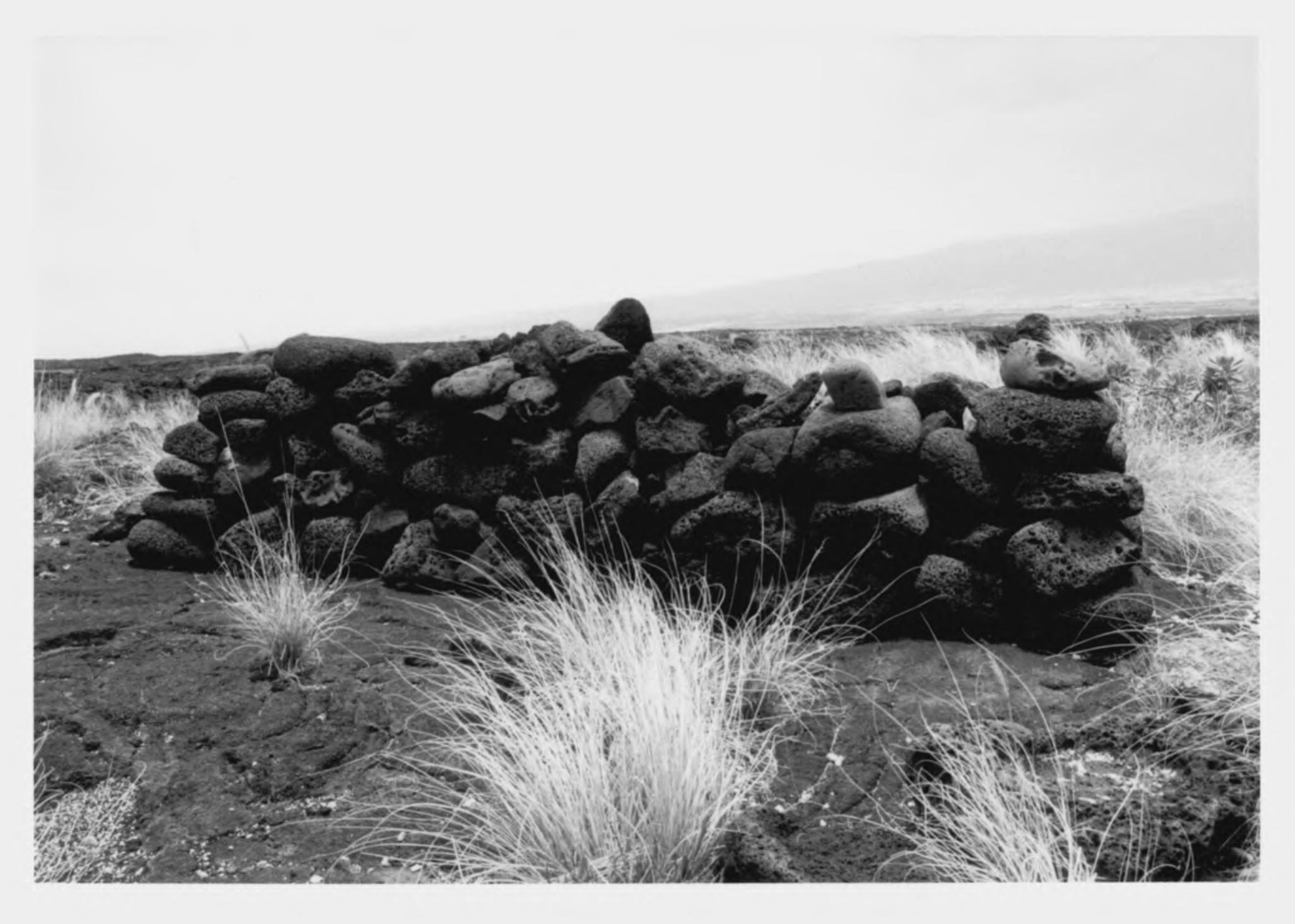
- An ancient house ruin

- Location within Hawaii
- Location: Keāhole Point
- Coordinates: 19°43′30″N 156°3′28.8″W
- Area: less than one acre
- Built: 1400-1800
- Architectural style: Ancient Hawaiian
- NRHP reference No.: 92001552
- Added to NRHP: November 21, 1992

Keāhole Point is the westernmost point of the island of Hawaiʻi. The Kona International Airport was moved here from directly north of the town of Kailua-Kona in 1970, when the previous smaller airstrip was converted into the Old Kona Airport State Recreation Area. The name comes from Ke ʻāhole since the ʻāhole fish (Kuhlia sandvicensis) was found nearby.

Between the airport and the coast lies the Natural Energy Laboratory of Hawaii. Most of the land was formed in 1801 by the Huʻehuʻe lava flow from Hualālai. This flow extended the shoreline out an estimated 1 mile, adding some 4 km^{2} of land to the island. The southern part of this point is sometimes referred to as Kalihi Point.

The Ahupuaʻa (ancient name of the community in this area) was Kalaoa, still used by the census. The site includes a house platform, a walled enclosure, a debris pile with volcanic glass and marine shells, and a larger wall. Probably the home of a common family, an excavation in 1975 estimated occupation from about 1500 to 1800. On January 14, 1989, the Kalaoa Permanent House Site was put on the state register of historic places as site number 10-27-10,205. On November 21, 1992, it was added to the National Register of Historic Places as site number 92001552. It was described as site 81 in a 1930 survey by Reinecke, and site 8 in a 1975 survey by Rosendahl & Kirch, and site HA-D15-12 on a state survey. Just south of this area is the area known as Oʻoma.
